= Paula Dehmel =

German writer (1862–1918)

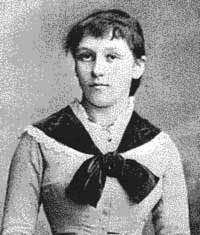
- Paula Dehmel, born Oppenheimer, as a young woman
- Born: Paula Oppenheimer; 31 December 1862; Berlin, Prussia (German Confederation)
- Died: 9 July 1918 (aged 55); Berlin-Steglitz, Germany
- Occupation(s): Pory; Children's author
- Spouse: Richard Dehmel (1863–1920 – as his first wife)
- Children: 3
- Parents: Dr. Julius Oppenheimer (1827–1909) (father); Antonia Davidsohn (1837–1910) (mother)

Paula Dehmel (born Paula Oppenheimer: 31 December 1862 – 9 July 1918) was a German writer. She wrote tales and poems for children. Between 1889 and 1900 she was married, under increasingly unconventional circumstances, to Richard Dehmel, who was among the country's best known and most popular poets during the first part of the twentieth century. She was also a sister of the polymath-sociologist Franz Oppenheimer (1864–1943).

== Life ==
=== Familial provenance ===
Paula Oppenheimer was born in Berlin. She was 8 when unification was proclaimed. Her parents were Antonia Oppenheimer, (born Davidsohn: 1837–1910) and Dr. Julius Oppenheimer (1827–1909), an exceptionally scholarly man who served for many years as a rabbi and teacher at the temple of the Berlin Reformed Jewish Community. Her mother was also a teacher. Her elder brother, Georg Oppenheimer, died of cholera in 1872. Several of her younger siblings survived to adulthood and achieved a measure of professional eminence. These included the physician Dr. Phil. Carl Nathan Oppenheimer who died in 1941 at Zeist (Utrecht) and Prof. Dr. Franz Oppenheimer who died in 1943 at Los Angeles. Her younger sister Lise married the noted Egyptologist Georg Steindorff: Lise lived to the age of 97. Paula herself would die following a long festering illness when she was only 55, sparing her from the nightmare of the Hitler Holocaust which drove at least two of her siblings to relocate to California.

Although relatively little information is available concerning Paula's own childhood, it is known that she was a pupil at the "Luisenschule", the first secondary school for girls in Berlin (which had been initially founded on a different site as far back as 1838).

=== Richard Dehmel ===
It was through her brother Franz that Paula Oppenheimer was introduced to the young writer Richard Dehmel. Paula and Richard married at Berlin, in defiance of grave misgivings on the part of Paula's younger brother, on 4 May 1889. The couple made their home in the Pankow quarter of north-central Berlin. Richard and Paula Dehmel led an intensely sociable existence at this time: barely a day went by without guests arriving at the house. The marriage was followed by the births of their three children, Veradetta (1890–1979), Heinz "Heinrich" Peter (1891–1932 – who later became a physician and author) and Liselotte (1897–1990).

During or around August 1892 Richard Dehmel fell in love with Paula's friend, the poet-translator Hedwig Lachmann, suggesting that they should all get together and live as a "threesome". Sources are silent over Paula's reaction to the proposal, which Lachmann rejected. Friendship between them all endured. In an age before readers could turn their attention to electronic media, Richard Dehmel was beginning to emerge as a celebrity poet, and he continued to hanker after a commensurate lifestyle. During 1895 he drew closer to Ida Auerbach, another poet, and the woman who later became Richard Dehmel's second wife. In the meantime, between the middle of 1898 and April 1899, Richard, Paula and Ida lived in what was generally perceived as "a marriage of three". They had managed to acquire the house next door to the house in which Richard and Paula had set up their home in 1889, so that now they lived in two houses, with Richard and Paula registered at their original address and Ida apparently living in the house next door with her infant son, who had been born in 1895 in the context of her own joyless (and brief) marriage to Leopold Auerbach. In May 1899 it was Paula who called an end to the arrangement, which Richard and Ida were away on a trip together from which Paula had been excluded. In the aftermath of the break-up it was Paula who stayed in the family home with the children.

The first poems from Paula and Richard Dehmel concerned their everyday dealings as parents with Vera and Heinz Peter, their small children. These poems used simple words and short rhymes to reflect simple self-discovery through the eyes of a child, and the concomitant immediate experiences and fantasy world to be found each day in the house or in the garden. At the same time, in the context of the education reforms underway around 1900, there was a renewed demand for poetry and literature tailored to the needs of children and young people, which prompted Richard Dehmel in particular, as early as 1895, to try and produce for publication poems for family reading and short stories suitable for youthfully short attention spans, which appeared in a new generation of literary journals targeting the children of the "educated middle classes" and their parents. Individual short stories from Dehmel were printed in 1894 in Die Gesellschaft ("... society"), Jugend in 1897, in Ver Sacrum in 1898 and in Pan in 1899.

=== Fitzebutze ===
It was only after her separation from Richard in 1899 that it became possible for Paula to arrange for the inclusion of Fitzebutze, a children's book which the couple had planned together, in the publication schedule of their Berlin publishers, Insel Verlag. On 14 November 1899 Richard Dehmel included the following stipulation with a "publication contract" which he sent to Paula: "By the way, in respect of § I [section 1], we reserve the right for you and me to divide between us the [rights in respect of] the 25 poems. ... We will need to agree together which of the individual poems that we wrote together should appear to posterity under your name and which under mine. Well, as I said, probably we can do a deal on this between ourselves orally [so without the practical force of a written agreement] afterwards". (Note: "Durch § I bleibt übrigens Dir wie mir das Recht vorbehalten, die 25 Gedichte später einmal zwischen uns zu teilen. ... Wir müssen dann eben miteinander ausmachen, welche von den gemeinsam verfassten Einzelgedichten vor der sogenannten Nachwelt unter Deinem Namen, und welche unter dem meinen gehen sollen. Nun, wie gesagt, dies Tauschgeschäft können wir ‚später einmal' wol mündlich erledigen.")

In a letter Paula wrote to Richard in September 1900 she pointed out that her name had not even been mentioned in the publicity material produced by Insel Verlag ahead of the book launch for Fitzebutze, meaning that when the book actually appeared in the shops, buyers would be likely to assume, incorrectly, that she had "wished to steal into the literary firmament hidden in the coat tails of her famous husband". (Note: "... ich hätte mich in den Rockfalten meines berühmten Gatten in die Litteratur hineinstehlen wollen.") Richard Dehmel had already highlighted the error to Insel Verlag, but in his response to his estranged wife, dated just two days later, he pointed out that when it came becoming lost in the coat tails of her famous spouse, that was where she was likely to remain, especially since she persistently clung to those coat tails. (Note: "An den ‚Rockschößen Deines berühmten Gatten' wirst Du freilich wol trotzdem hängen bleiben, zumal Du selber Dich beharrlich daran festhältst.") Maybe this was intended as a hint: either way, Paula Dehmel responded promptly to her husband's shared observation, agreeing at once to a divorce and within a couple of weeks setting in motion the necessary legal steps.

In November 1900, when Fitzebutze was duly published by Insel Verlag through Schuster & Loeffler, authorship was jointly credited to Paula and Richard Dehmel.

=== After Richard ===
The marriage ended in divorce, formally at the end of 1900. The parties continued to correspond frequently, however, both concerning their children and concerning "ideas for their writing" – principally ideas for Paula's writing. Paula lived with the children, temporarily, in Berlin-Grunewald and then moved to Berlin-Wilmersdorf. Some years later she moved again, this time to Berlin-Steglitz. Richard Dehmel moved away, relocating initially to Heidelberg and then, very soon after that, to Hamburg-Blankenese, where he would live out his final two decades.

=== Independence ===
Meanwhile, Paula Dehmel progressed her new project, authoring stories and tales, while writing poems for Rumpumpel, a book for children that she was planning. At the end of March 1901 she sent the manuscripts for Rumpumpel to Richard Dehmel. She received his copious comments and proposals for corrections, within less than a week with gratitude, but only implemented relatively few of his suggestions, explaining the from now on she would "follow [her] own inner judgements". (Note: ".... weil ich mich von nun an nach meinem innern Urteil richte.") During the years that followed she was increasingly concerned to seek recognition for her own independently produced poetic output.

In December 1901 Richard Dehmel asked Paula Dehmel to work with him on a new anthology for children. By this time she had already received requests for other publishers for new tales and stories. She communicated her problem to Richard Dehmel: "I'm getting requests for more children's tales and fables than there are". (Note: "... soviel Märchen und Kindergedichte giebts ja gar nicht, wie man jetzt von mir haben will".) She still found it necessary to defend her literary independence from the steam-rollering propensities of her former husband. In the same letter she rebuked him: "... even if you are RD, I will not inflict [your] smarmy barbs on my little Will-o'-the-wisps! Go to the devil!". (Note: "Aber wenn Du auch R. D. bist – mein Feuermännchen laß ich mir nicht‚ sentimental' schimpfen! Zum Teufel!")

The robust frostiness incorporated in Paula's letter to Richard Dehmel at the end of 1901 did not reflect any serious falling out between the two of them, however. She later sent him further contributions for his anthology as well as a first draft for Sengine. When he nevertheless supplied a vast storm of "suggestions" and "corrections" to these manuscripts, she respectfully resisted what seems to have amounted to a set of comprehensive re-writes from her former husband: "You must learn to accept my modest artistic efforts as they are. That's how I like them. I have certainly not imitated anyone. I just want to create very simple sentences that children could understand immediately, and effortlessly reuse in their own prose. At the same time I endeavour to write good German, and that is where I made the joyous discovery, of a fresh narrative voice. ... You also need to bear in mind that even though I still use your family name [of Dehmel], that does not confer on you some sort of artistic responsibility over what I write. ... now that I myself am able to feel independent and free from any sort of authority figure, my own artistic needs come powerfully to the fore, and in the process simply push me away from you!" (Note: "Du musst nun schon meine kleinen künstlerischen Erzeugnisse nehmen, wie sie sind – mir gefallen sie ... Ich habe überhaupt Niemand nachgemacht; ich wollte recht einfache, für Kinder unmittelbar verständliche Sätze bilden, die sie ohne Mühe nacherzählen können und bemühte mich zu gleicher Zeit gutes Deutsch zu schreiben, und da kam diese, wie ich zu meiner eigenen Freude fand, frische Erzählerart zustande. ... Du mußt doch auch bedenken, daß Du, wenn ich nun auch Deinen Namen führe, nicht künstlerisch verantwortlich für das bist, was ich schreibe. ... jetzt, wo ich mich persönlich selbständig und frei von Autoritätsglauben fühle, kommt auch ein künstlerisches Eigenbedürfnis stark zum Leben und drängt mich einfach von Dir los!")

Rumpumpel, the first published work for which Paula Dehmel was named as sole author, appeared in the shops in 1903. It became one of the best-known books available for young mothers and their little children. Der Buntscheck, a children's anthology compiled by Richard Dehmel, followed in 1904. Several writers were involved in producing the stories in it, including Paula Dehmel, who was among those identified by name as an author.

A couple of years after they appeared, Richard Dehmel shared his assessment that neither Fitzebutze nor Rumpumpel had achieved the commercial success that he would have hoped for. In a short letter to Paul Scheerbart he set out the judgement, "The thought grew on me. I feel with my famous bell weather instinct that the field has become over-grazed". (Note: "Bei mir hat's wirklich ausgekindert. Ich fühl's mit dem berühmten Leithammel-Instinkt, daß das Feld abgegrast ist.") Irrespective of Richard Dehmel's bell weather instinct, a hundred years later Paula Dehmel's early works for children appear to have endured better than most.

=== Middle years ===
Paula Dehmel continued to build her reputation with critics and book buyers, writing song lyrics, stories and tales for children. As early as 1906, writing in his new Guide to Modern Literature, Erich Mühsam described her as "an outstanding children's poet". Mühsam went on to remind readers of her early work, and to introduce revelations of which they might hitherto have been unaware: "Richard Dehmel produced 'Fitzebutze' with her: however, precisely because it is not widely known, it must be emphasized that most of the contents of this volume, including the best and most effective of the poems, are by Paula Dehmel. She knows how to hit precisely the right tone to find resonance on the souls of small children because, on the page, she babbles to the child in his/her own inelegant language and then translates that language into a lispy child-speak. Just how much more she achieves in this all-embracing and not to be under-estimated child-art, both pedagogically and as a literary playmate, becomes apparent from "Rumpumpel", recently published and which she produced independently, and from "Buntscheck", in which she signs her contributions with her own name ...[especially when compared with the so-called "joint project" represented by "Fitzebutze"].

A compilation of tales, Das grüne Haus, appeared in 1907, followed in 1912 by Auf der bunten Wiese" ("On the colourful meadow"), a book of children's poems which seems to have impressed even her ex-husband when she sent him the manuscript for comments.

In 1912 Paula Dehmel obtained a more regular job, working as a producer for Meidingers Kinderkalender ("...children's calendar" - formerly Auerbach's Deutscher Kinderkalender), a plump, annually produced compilation aimed at the children of Germany's educated classes. At around this time she was also working on translations into German of John Habberton's Helen's Babies and Other People's Children, which were published in 1913 by Josef Singer Verlag.

=== War years: final years ===
Following the outbreak of war in July 1914, Germany faced four years of acute and intensifying austerity on the home front. Meidingers Jugendschriften Verlag, the publishers for whom she worked, were forced to make savings and Paula Dehmel found that she had to pay any fees arising for contributions from fellow authors out of her own pocket. She nevertheless still derived huge satisfaction from her work on the Meidingers Kinderkalender, and relocated to a smaller apartment, which was in Berlin-Steglitz. Despite increasingly serious bouts of energy sapping illness she was still working during 1917 on the Meidingers Kinder-Kalender ("annual") for 1918, of which she is credited as the author-compiler.

During the war years Paula Dehmel's relations with her ex-husband became noticeably less prickly and then more cordial. For the first time since the divorce back in 1899, Paula's friendship circle came to include her husband's second wife, whom she took to calling "Frau Isi" (loosely, "Mrs. Isi"), the name by which Ida Dehmel was known to intimates and other friends. She even started asking Richard for his advice on forthcoming fee contracts. She received his "proposals" for changes to the manuscript for her forthcoming book, Singinens Geschichte (which, as matters turned out, would be published posthumously) gratefully, and with no obvious indications of dissent.

Beyond her immediate family, Paula Dehmel's literary circle included a number of other prominent members of Germany's (mostly Berlin-based) literary elite during this time, including Else Lasker-Schüler, Otto Julius Bierbaum, Arno Holz, Johannes Schlaf and Gustav Kühl.

Paula Dehmel died in Berlin-Steglitz at the end of a long and debilitating illness on 9 July 1918.

After her death Richard Dehmel saw to the publication of her poetry compilation Das liebe Nest (1919) and Singinens Geschichten (1921), in both cases presented as independently produced works by Paula Dehmel. Numerous volumes including works by Paula Dehmel, especially in respect of the poems she wrote for infants and small children, have continued to appear ever since.
