= Helen's Babies =

Helen's Babies may refer to:

- Helen's Babies (novel), an 1876 humorous novel by John Habberton
- Helen's Babies (film), a 1924 silent comedy film directed by William A. Seiter, based on the novel
