= Good Bad Books =

1945 essay by George Orwell

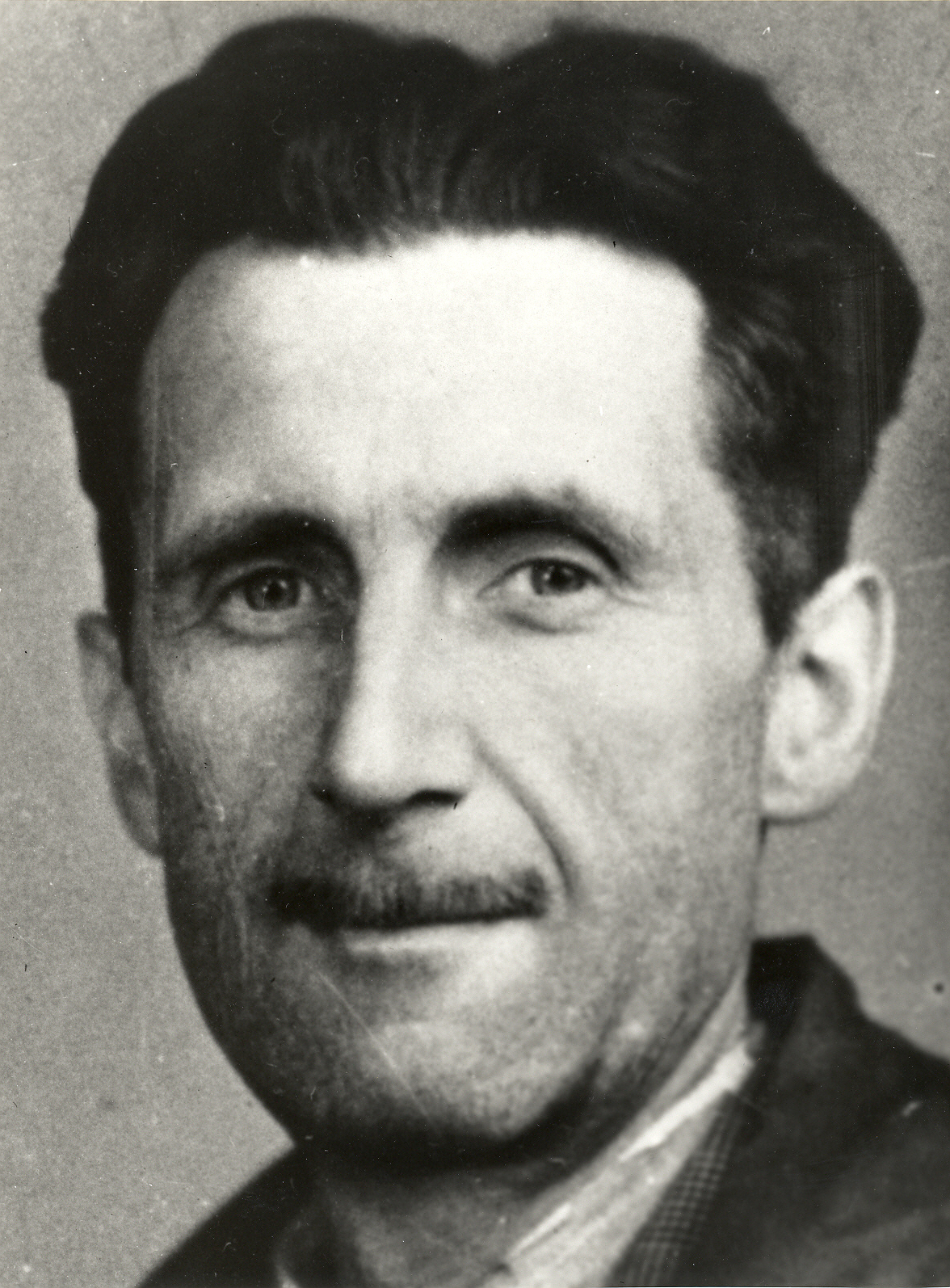
George Orwell

"Good Bad Books" is an essay by George Orwell first published in Tribune on 2 November 1945. After Orwell's death, the essay was republished in Shooting an Elephant and Other Essays (1950).

The essay examines the lasting popularity of works not usually considered great literature. Orwell defines a "good bad book" as "the kind of book that has no literary pretensions but which remains readable when more serious productions have perished."

Orwell concludes: "I would back Uncle Tom's Cabin to outlive the complete works of Virginia Woolf or George Moore, though I know of no strictly literary test which would show where the superiority lies."

He acknowledges G. K. Chesterton as the originator of the term, as seen in his defences of penny dreadfuls and detective stories in the 1901 collection The Defendant.

== Orwell's examples ==
Orwell claims that "perhaps the supreme example of the 'good bad' book is Uncle Tom's Cabin. It is an unintentionally ludicrous book, full of preposterous melodramatic incidents; it is also deeply moving and essentially true; it is hard to say which quality outweighs the other."

Other examples he gives include the Sherlock Holmes and Raffles stories, R. Austin Freeman's stories The Singing Bone, The Eye of Osiris and others, Max Carrados, Dracula, Helen's Babies and King Solomon's Mines.

The minor novelists W. L. George, Leonard Merrick, J. D. Beresford, Ernest Raymond, May Sinclair, and A. S. M. Hutchinson are also mentioned as writers "whom it is quite impossible to call 'good' by any strictly literary standard, but who are natural novelists and who seem to attain sincerity partly because they are not inhibited by good taste."

He presented Vorticist painter and writer Wyndham Lewis as the exemplar of a writer who is cerebral without being artistic. Orwell wrote, "Enough talent to set up dozens of ordinary writers has been poured into Wyndham Lewis's so-called novels, such as Tarr or Snooty Baronet. Yet it would be a very heavy labour to read one of these books right through. Some indefinable quality, a sort of literary vitamin, which exists even in a book like [A. S. M. Hutchinson's 1922 melodrama] If Winter Comes, is absent from them."

== Related essays by Orwell ==
Orwell also discusses Helen's Babies by John Habberton in his 1946 essay "Riding Down from Bangor".

== Other uses ==
The notion is inverted in The Anti-Booklist by Brian Redhead and Kenneth McLeish, in which the authors critique a range of "bad good" books, generally thought to be "good books".

== See also ==
- Classic book
- George Orwell bibliography
- Western canon
