= Riding Down from Bangor =

Riding Down from Bangor may refer to:

- Riding Down from Bangor (song), words written by Louis Shreve Osborne in 1871
- Riding Down from Bangor (essay), 1946 essay by George Orwell
