= Alfred Mombert =

German poet (1872–1942)

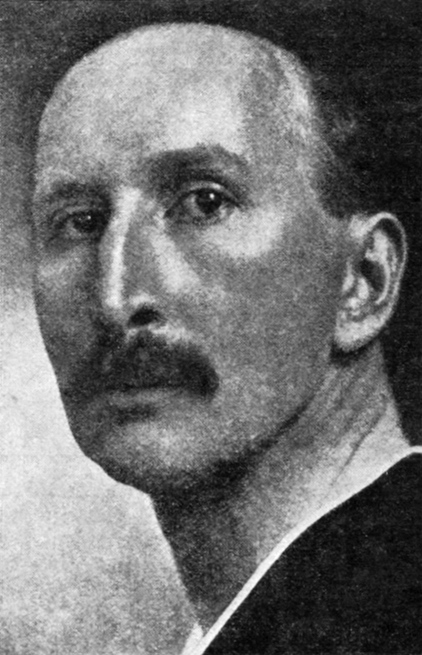
- Alfred Mombert
- Born: 6 February 1872; Karlsruhe
- Died: 8 April 1942 (aged 70)
- Occupation: Lawyer
- Known for: Poetry

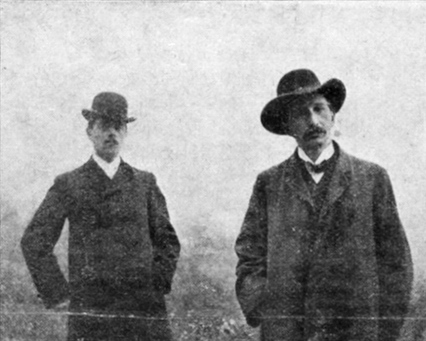
Alfred Mombert and Emanuel Lešehrad in Prague, 1906

Alfred Mombert (6 February 1872, in Karlsruhe – 8 April 1942, in Winterthur) was a German poet.

== Biography ==
Mombert was the son of the Jewish-German merchant Eduard Mombert and his wife Helene Gombertz. The economist Paul Mombert was his cousin. In 1890, he passed his Abitur at the humanistischen Grossherzoglichen Gymnasium in his home city of Karlsruhe, and then completed his one-year military service as a volunteer.

From 1891 to 1895 he studied law at the universities of Heidelberg, Leipzig and Berlin. In 1896, he passed his first state exam in Heidelberg, and received his doctorate one year later without a dissertation. Afterwards, he proceeded to work as a legal trainee and assistant, he passed his second state exam in 1899. From 1899 to 1906 he practiced law in Heidelberg, where he lived until 1940, a few years in Munich (1909-1911), until 1940. After 1906, he left his occupation and proceeded to devote himself to his literary work.

Accompanying his literary pursuits, Mombert studied subjects such as geography, oriental studies, along with taking many trips, particularly to Italy and Switzerland. Mombert managed also to visit a multitude of other countries: Egypt, Algeria, Greece, The Netherlands, Croatia, Morocco, Monaco, Norway, Austria, Portugal, Spain, Sweden, Syria, Czechoslovakia, and Tunisia. All the while he was intensively studying ancient Nordic, Oriental, and Indian mythology. This intense study, along with serious contact with the works of Friedrich Nietzsche, and a visionary, life-defining experience from January 1894 lay the groundwork for a kind of mythological-cosmological private religion that he developed through subsequent poetry after The Glowing One.

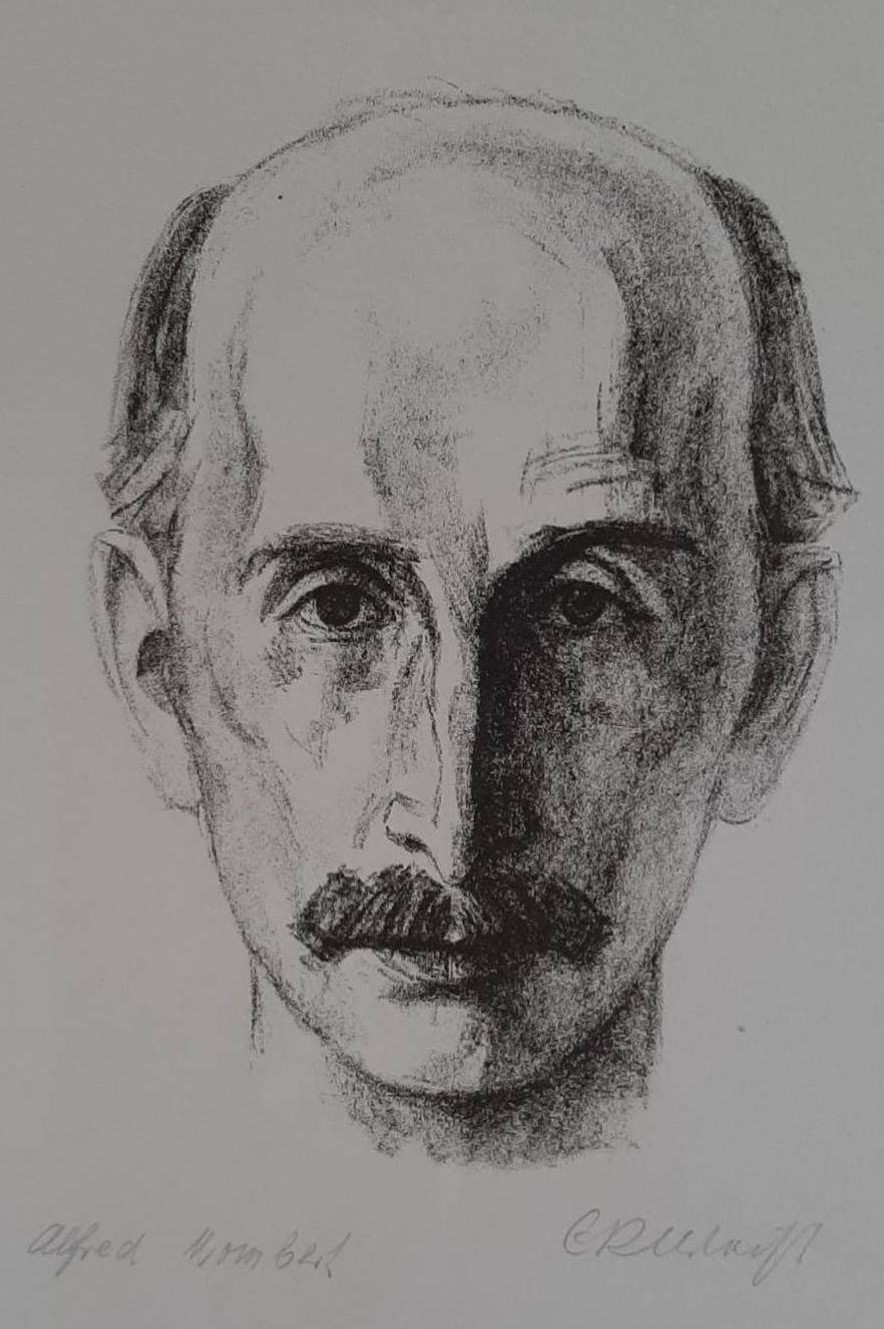
Alfred Mombert 1924, Lithograph by Emil Rudolf Weiss

His mythological-visionary works were highly valued by Friedrich Kurt Benndorf, Richard Benz, Martin Buber, Hans Carossa, Richard Dehmel, Herbert Eulenberg, Oskar Loerke, Alfons Paquet und Stanisław Przybyszewski, who translated portions of his work into Polish. Mombert spent his years as a writer unmarried, living very secluded, solitary life, often travelling alone. From 1939 until his death, he lived with his widowed sister Ella Gutman. He, however, was friendly with other artists and writers of the time such as: Hans Carossa, Ida, Richard Dehmel, Martin Buber, Max Dauthendey, Herbert Eulenberg, Hermann Hesse, Gustav Landauer, Rudolf Pannwitz, Hans Reinhart, Emanuel Lešehrad, who translated portions of his work into Czech, Hermann Haller, Karl Hofer, Arthur Zweiniger, Emil Rudolf Weiß, who made a portrait of him, and Gustav Wolf, who created images to accompany Mombert's poetry. Letters also indicate, despite great distances, Mombert maintained a love affair with a long-unknown pianist, with the alias Vasanta, who has since been identified as Charlotte Kaufmann (1880-1960). Mombert was also in regular correspondence with a singer by the name of Gertrud Full, whose repertoire included some of his poetry.

== Published works ==
- Der Sonnengeist (1905).
- Aeon, der Weltgesuchte (1907).
- Aeon vor Syrakus (1911).
- Der Himmlische Zecher (1909).
- Der Held der Erde (1919).
- Aeon Zwischen den Frauen (1920).
