= Ida Dehmel =

German lyric poet, a muse, and a feminist

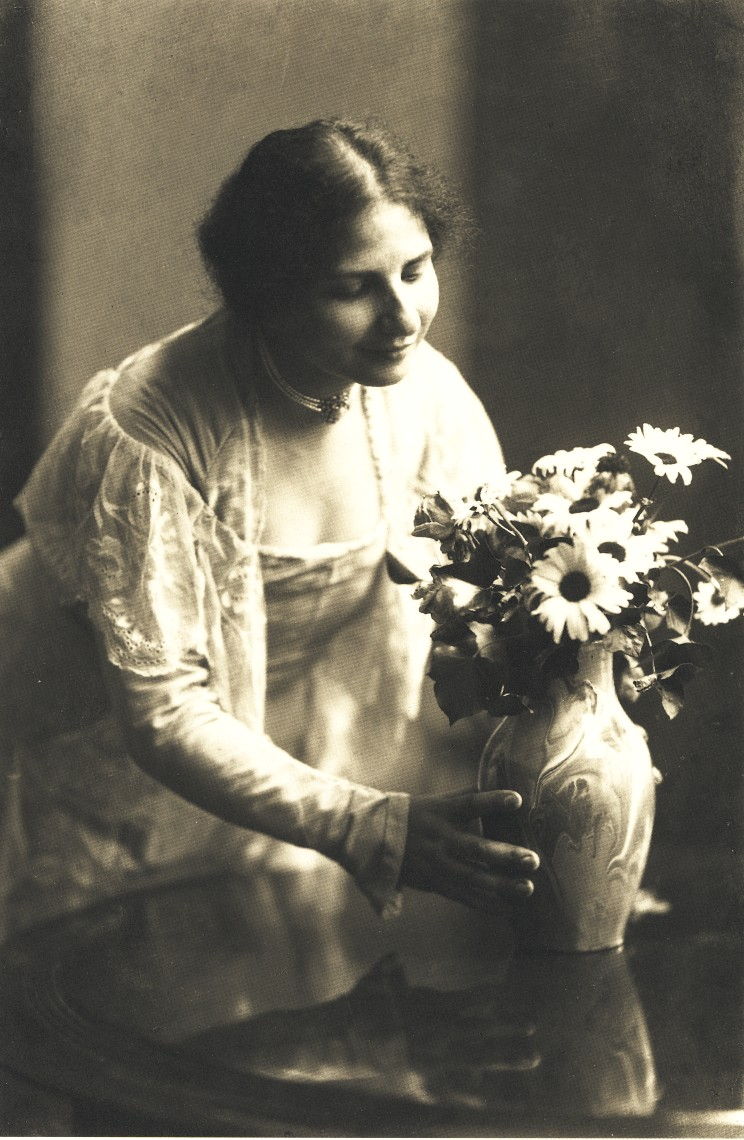
- Dehmel photographed by Jacob Hilsdorf
- Born: 14 January 1870; Bingen am Rhein
- Died: 29 September 1942 (aged 72); Hamburg
- Cause of death: suicide
- Organization(s): Deutscher Verband für Frauenstimmrecht; GEDOK

Ida Dehmel (born Ida Coblenz: 14 January 1870 – 29 September 1942) was a German lyric poet and muse, a feminist, and a supporter of the arts.

After 1933 she was persecuted on account of her Jewishness: in 1942, large scale deportations of Jews began from the city where she had made her home. She committed suicide by taking an overdose of sleeping pills.

== Life ==
=== Provenance and early years ===
Ida Coblenz was born in Bingen, along the left bank of the Rhine, into a prosperous well established Jewish family. There were five children. Their mother died while they were still small. Simon Zacharias Coblenz, their father, was a wine grower and leading member of the local business community who inflicted a strict rule based upbringing on his motherless children. Orthodox Judaism, its religious holidays, and precepts commanded respected. As a teenager, she attended a boarding school in Belgium in 1885/86 where, as she later recalled, she first experienced anti-Semitism. In 1892 she got to know the poet Stefan George. During the summer of 1892 they grew close, taking long walks together in the hills around Bingen: the poet came close to dedicating a cycle of poems to her.

=== First marriage ===
When Ida married, however, in 1895, it was to Leopold Auerbach, a Jewish businessman and philanthropist from Berlin, who was her father's choice. The couple lived in a large town house at Lennéstrasse 5 in Berlin's Tiergarten quarter. Their son, Heinz-Lux Auerbach, was born in December 1895.

In what may have been a deliberate rebellion against her Orthodox Jewish upbringing, Ida "Isi" Auerbach combined the life of an Imperial German wife, mother, and polite society hostess with patronage of Berlin's Literary Bohemia; which is similar to upper class members of the Radical chic, Bionade-Biedermeier, and Bobo subcultures during the late 20th and early 21st-centuries. The Auerbachs' marriage was nevertheless a joyless one.

The Auerbachs' home became a focus for the Friedrichshagen Poets' Circle. Members included the poet-writer Richard Dehmel, whose wife, Paula, was also a writer (and sister to the distinguished sociologist-economist, Franz Oppenheimer). Meanwhile, rumours of Leopold Auerbach's impending bankruptcy turned out to be correct: during the second half of the decade the fine town house in the Tiergarten quarter had to be vacated and Ida Auerbach's life as a society hostess came to an end. The marriage broke. In 1898 Ida Auerbach and her young son moved to Berlin-Pankow on the north side of town. She was now living close to Richard and Paula Dehmel who had become close friends. Fairly quickly the relationship between the three of them mutated into what amounted to an informal three way marriage. That arrangement proved brittle, but according to one source the three of them lived virtually together till April 1899, occupying two adjacent houses in what later became Parkstraße (Park Street).

=== Second marriage ===
Between the summer of 1899 and the end of 1900 Richard Dehmal and Ida travelled together. They went first to Munich and then undertook an extensive tour of Greece and Italy. On the way back they stopped off at Sirmione at the Italian end of Lake Garda. They would have stayed there longer, but Ida fell ill with Typhus and the local doctor recommended that she return to Germany to convalesce. They moved north to Heidelberg where their friend Alfred Mombert lived. Other neighbours were Peter and Lily Behrens. Ida's elder sister, Alice Bensheimer, lived in the Mannheim conurbation nearby. Heidelberg was also within easy reach by train of the Mathildenhöhe Artists' Colony at Darmstadt. There was never any shortage of friends, but Ida Dehmel's Orthodox Jewish kinsfolk were nevertheless underwhelmed by her divorce from Auerbach and her cohabitation with the non-Jewish Dehmel, which may explain why, when in October 1901 they finally got round to marrying each other, they went to Bloomsbury, London in England to do so. A few years later the couple's friend, the Berlin artist Julie Wolfthorn, prepared two oil-paint portraits of the Dehmels, which were exhibited in 1906 at the third exhibition of the German Artists' Association, held in 1906 at the Grand Ducal Museum, Weimar.

After they married they settled not in Heidelberg but, further away from the disapproval of both their families, in Hamburg. Unable to know the nightmarish horrors that the new century would bring to Europe and indeed to her own family, Ida wrote of this time that she had wanted to create a new heaven and a new earth. ("Ich möchte einen neuen Himmel kreieren und eine neue Erde."). Together the Dehmels traveled frequently to lectures and readings. Favourite destinations included Berlin, Munich, Vienna, Leipzig and Dresden. It is indeed not immediately clear from sources that during the first few years of the twentieth century they saw Hamburg as their permanent home. One place where they spent a lot of time was Weimar where, with friends, they were closely involved in the creation of a new cultural centre. They met or corresponded regularly with leading figures of the time, such as the artist Max Liebermann, the architect Henry van de Velde, the publisher Harry Kessler and the poets Detlev von Liliencron, Alfred Mombert and Paul Scheerbart. In 1911 Richard and Ida Dehmel asked the Hamburg architect Walther Baedeker to design what became known as the "Dehmel House" at Westerstraße 5 (later Richard-Dehmel-Straße 1). Ida Dehmel quickly made the new home a centre of activity for the leading lights of the Hamburg artists' set. She encouraged young artists to fulfill the dream of becoming a "self-supporting element in a much larger movement".

Ida Dehmel also remained in close contact with her sister, Alice, six years her senior. Alice, based in Mannheim, was a leading proponent of women's education and by now was also increasingly involving herself in other aspects of the feminist agenda. In Hamburg Ida joined the struggle, founding the "Hamburg Women's Club" in 1906 and becoming, in 1911, chair of the "North German League for Women's Suffrage" ("Norddeutsche Verband für Frauenstimmrecht"). In 1913 she founded the "League of North German Women Artists" ("Bund Niederdeutscher Künstlerinnen"). She also returned to a childhood interest in beads, and in craftwork more generally, joining the National Craftwork Association and herself producing bags, belts and lampshades.

=== War and death ===
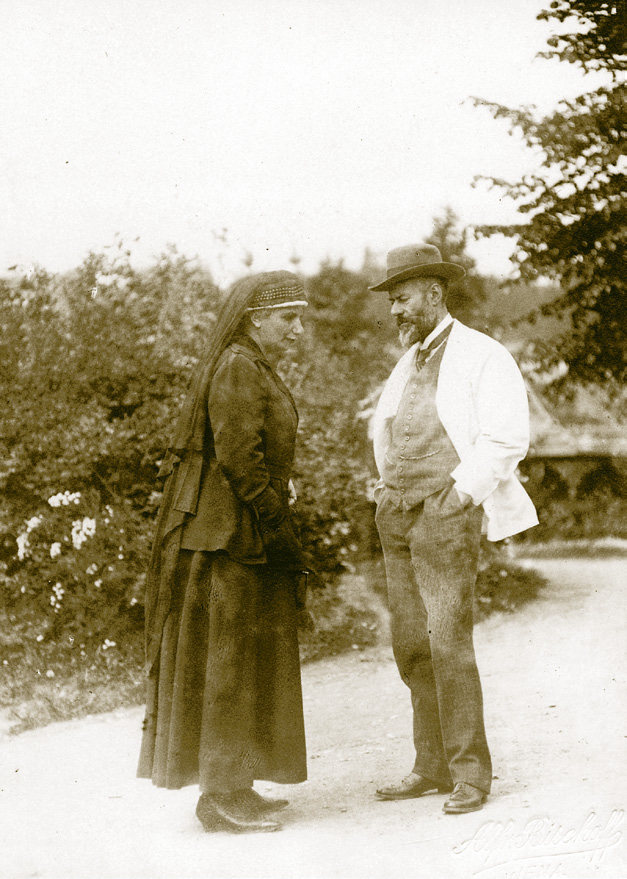
Ida Dehmel speaking with Max Weber at Lauenstein in 1917

War broke out in July 1914. Richard Dehmel, by now aged 50, volunteered to join the army. Her son, Heinz-Lux Auerbach was conscripted and died in France in the slaughter of 1917. Her husband suffered a serious leg wound which caused a thrombosis in 1919 and led to his death on 8 February 1920. During the war years her own social involvement intensified. She became deputy chair of the Deutscher Frauendank, described in translation as "a women's wartime trust" and became "corresponding secretary" of the (reflecting wartime pressures, now ever more "conservative") Deutscher Verband für Frauenstimmrecht. She was also an active member of the National Liberal Party and chair of the newly founded "Women's League for the promotion of German Visual Arts" ("Frauenbund zur Förderung deutscher bildender Kunst") which she set up with Rosa Schapire. After her son died, however, and even more following the death of her husband in 1920, she devoted much of her time and abundant energy to conserving Richard Dehmel's artistic legacy, creating a "Dehmel Foundation" and a "Dehmel Association", which received support from leading fellow citizens including the mayor, Werner von Melle.

=== Weimar years ===
Ida Dehmel's long widowhood began three weeks after her fiftieth birthday. With financial backing from the "Dehmel Foundation" and "Dehmel Association" she now worked intensively on collating and editing her late husband's unpublished work, publishing a two volume compilation of a selection of his letters in 1926. That year she entered into a deal with the municipality and Hamburg University Library which involved selling Richard's literary archive to them, while for the time being retaining possession of the papers at what was by now known as the "Dehmel House", where she could readily access them. Despite the many difficulties she experienced with the authorities after 1933, arrangements concerning her late husband's papers survived till 1939 when, with the outbreak of war, they were physically transferred to the library buildings for security reasons. By 1920 much of the home that Ida and Richard had created resembled a well curated museum of contemporary art, in which Ida Dehmel staged a succession of events, arranged according to a range of social, artistic and charitable objectives. There were costume displays, flower festivals, temporary bazaars and exhibitions. She was able to apply and build on the skills and aptitudes she had developed as an arts backer and hostess back in Berlin during the 1890s. Her particular focus was on women's clubs and arts associations. This was the context in which in 1926 she set up the League of female artists associations of all genres ("Gemeinschaft Deutscher und Oesterreichischer Künstlerinnenvereine aller Kunstgattungen" / now known as "GEDOK"). By 1933 the organisation, which she led, had grown to 7,000 members. 1933 would be the year in which 5,000 of those members resigned, however.

=== Nazi years ===
In January 1933 the Nazis took power and lost little time in transforming Germany into a one-party dictatorship. The party's popular support was built on the traditional populist themes of hope and hatred. The principal focus of their hatred was split between the Communists and the Jews. Ida Dehmel was no communist, but she was Jewish. On 20 April 1933 Nazi paramilitaries broke into the meeting room at the Hamburger Hof (hotel) where Dehmel was presiding over the monthly GEDOK meeting: they demanded her resignation. Three weeks later, because of her Jewish provenance, she did indeed resign from the organisation that she had herself set up. Subsequently, it became impossible for her to publish anything she wrote or anything from her late husband's literary estate. During the years of persecution her first priority remained the care of the Dehmel House, and this was the reason why, unlike others, she rejected any thought of emigration.

After her sister Alice died in March 1935 she took two lengthy ocean cruises, visiting the United States, Central America and the West Indies while it was still possible for her to travel. Although few were able or willing to foresee the scale and horror of the Shoah a few years later, there was a clear sense of the net tightening on those Jews who had been unwilling (or for financial reasons unable) to leave Germany. Ida Dehmel became progressively more isolated. On 6 December 1937 she was persuaded to become a member of the Christian Evangelical Reformed Church. In 1938 the government imposed a requirement that Jews should assume "old testament names", and from this point she is identified in official documents as "Jedidja". Still she refused to abandon the Dehmel house. In a letter sent to a friend in December 1938 she wrote that she would never leave: "Marion, ich würde nie auswandern ... im Moment in dem ich das Dehmelhaus verlassen muß, mache ich Schluß.."

The Second World War began September 1939, after which Ida Dehmel was required to remain in the Blankenese quarter of Hamburg, where she lived and where now she concentrated on reworking the final version of her (never published) autobiographical novel, Daija. Through the intervention of her friend, Mary von Toll, with Prince Friedrich Christian of Schaumburg-Lippe, who had been working closely for many years with the Propaganda Minister, Joseph Goebbels, she was permitted to remain at the "Dehmel House" and spared the indignity of being forced to wear a "Jew star" sewn onto her outer garments. Her outlook became progressively more threatening, although there were still many friends and acquaintances, both in Germany and from overseas, intervening with the authorities to try and keep her away from the looming holocaust, which it was becoming impossible to overlook. In October 1941 she wrote a letter to her friend Mary Stern: "You write me a beautiful letter, not knowing that in the meantime I have come close not simply to Death but also to Hell. Since Wednesday it has been not just my life, but also that of thousands of others, that has been an unimaginable agony. On Wednesday 2,000 (it cannot actually have been more than 1,500) Hamburg Jews received the evacuation order. Provisionally. One knows everything that will follow. Cruel conditions. Things to be taken along: louse ointment, insect powder, dust comb. To Litzmanstadt. Here and there a complete family, but also father or mother, or daughter or son, separated out. The domestic servant of my Jewish tenant is there, so short of being there already, I have lived it all. An Aryan acquaintance of my tenant came to visit. I opened the door to her. A young woman. She said to me, "How good that you're still in: it means you can prepare better for the journey." and then her tongue seemed to become frozen in her mouth ....".

The deportations continued. In September 1942, aged 72, Ida Dehmel was still in her home, but she believed she was incurably ill, and even if she were to be spared deportation she feared becoming dependent on others. Her will to live was destroyed by her illness and by the grim circumstances of the time and place. On 29 September 1942 she took an overdose of sleeping pills and ended her life.
