= Matthew Church (Berlin-Steglitz) =

Coordinates: 52.4561°N 13.3182°E

- Matthäuskirche
- Matthew Church
- Location: Steglitz, Berlin
- Country: Germany
- Denomination: Protestant
- Website: www.matthaeus-steglitz.de

Architecture
- Heritage designation: Listed
- Architect: Emil Gette
- Years built: 1876-1880
- Completed: 1880

Matthew Church (German: Matthäuskirche) is a Protestant church in Steglitz, Berlin. It was built from 1876 to 1880 to replace the undersized and dilapidated Steglitzer village church. In 1880 three inaugurated naves were designed by architect Emil Gette. The church, parish hall, rectory and cemetery are now listed.

== History ==
The first pastor was Arthur Wuthenow (1844–1921). A street is named after him in the vicinity of the church. On March 1, 1945, almost all the church windows were destroyed by pressure waves during an air raid. In 1957 the church received a renovation directed by architect Dr. Gabler. In 2002, Matthew Church counted about 5360 members, had two pastors and operated a nursery and a kindergarten.

== Readings ==
- Günther Kühne, Elisabeth Stephanie: Evangelische Kirchen in Berlin, Berlin 1978.
- Klaus-Dieter Wille: Die Glocken von Berlin (West). Geschichte und Inventar, Berlin 1987.
- Architekten- und Ingenieur-Verein zu Berlin: Berlin und seine Bauten. Teil VI. Sakralbauten, Berlin 1997.
- Christine Goetz, Matthias Hoffmann-Tauschwitz: Kirchen Berlin Potsdam, Berlin 2003.
- Georg Dehio: Handbuch der Deutschen Kunstdenkmäler. Band Berlin, München/Berlin 2006.
