= Sigrid Kressmann-Zschach =

German architect (1929–1990)

Sigrid Kressmann-Zschach (1929–1990) was a German architect, businesswoman, and entrepreneur. Her best known works are the Ku'Damm Karrée and Steglitzer Kreisel buildings in Berlin.

== Biography ==
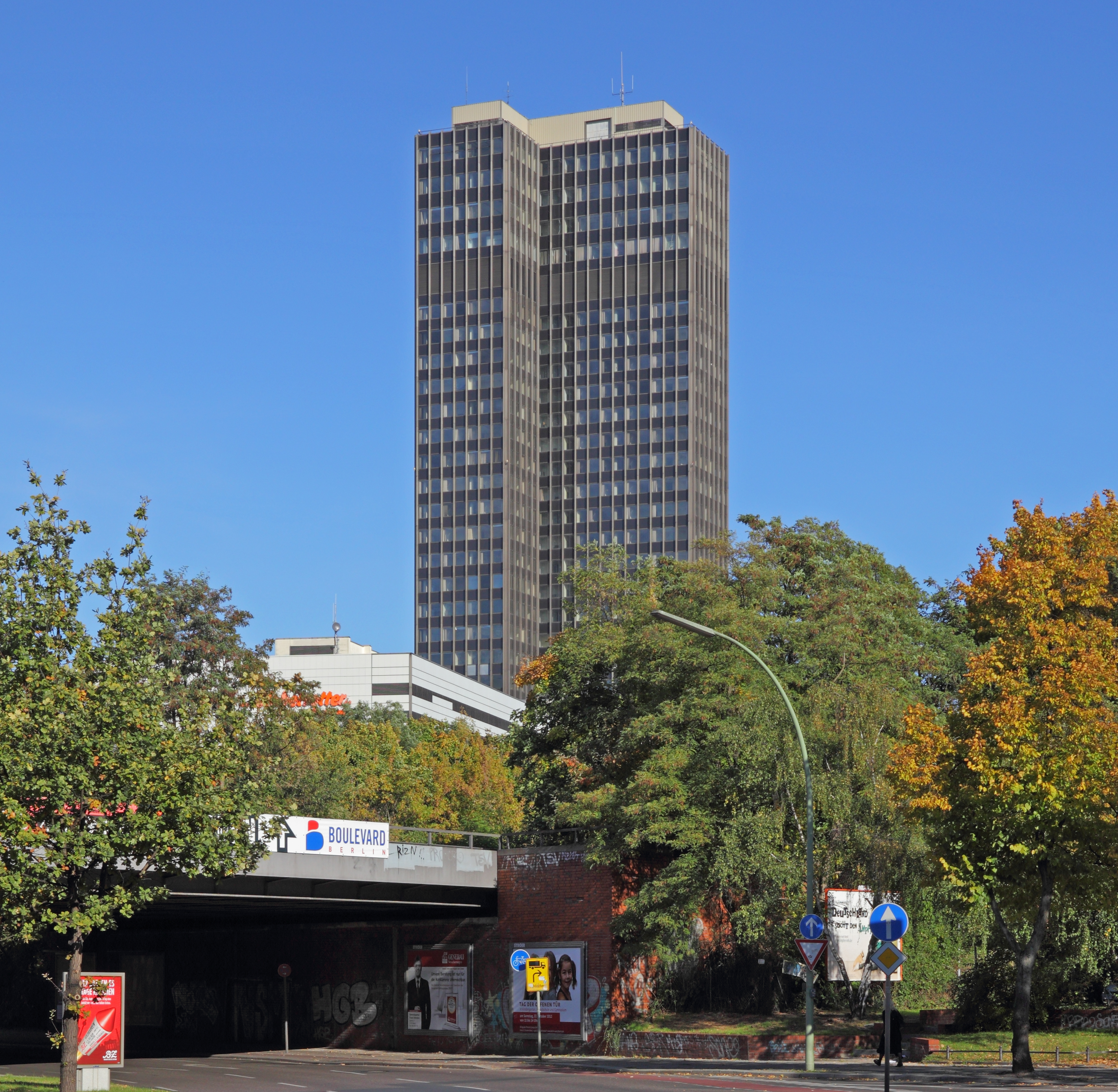
Steglitzer Kreisel, Berlin

Sigrid Zschach was born in Leipzig on 27 July 1929. She graduated with a degree in architecture at the Technical University of Dresden. In the 1950s she moved to Berlin. Kressmann-Zschach married three times and is known to have had several lovers. She became known as a skillful and wealthy career woman but also for her style, blonde hair and good looks.

Kressmann-Zschach's second marriage was to Willy Kressmann, mayor of the affluent Berlin-Kreuzberg district. It allowed her to enter Berlin 'society' and she was able to obtain first hand information about new construction projects. Kressmann-Zschach heard of plans to build a new subway system to Steglitz and produced designs for a 30-storey office block, with a subway station in the basement and Germany's first shopping mall. She secured a DM180 million contract for the scheme, which became known as the Steglitzer Kreisel. The project caused continual scandal as costs escalated and eventually Kressman-Zschach's development company went bankrupt.

Kressmann-Zschach ultimately employed over 300 people. In 1971, when she employed 200 people, it was reported she resisted the election of a works council, complaining that her employees spent a third of their time in discussion rather than working. She sacked three ringleaders and demoted another. However, in the same year Kressmann-Zschach took her staff on an expenses-paid trip to New York, in return for their commitment to stay with the company for a certain period.

Kressmann-Zschach died from cancer aged 61, on 28 October 1990. Her obituary credited her with having given Berlin a piece of 'Dallas' or 'Denver'.

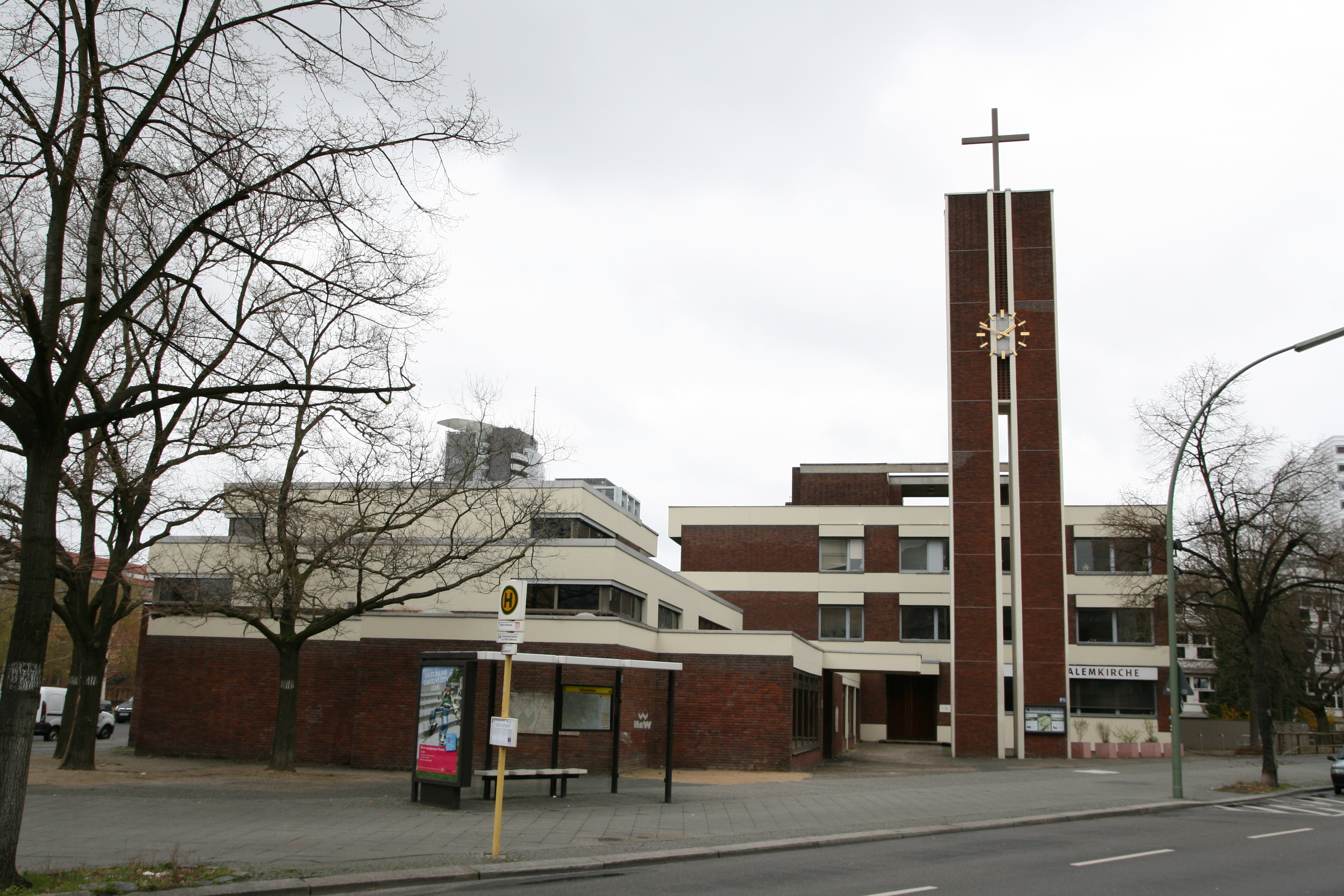
Jerusalemer Kirche, Friedrichstadt

== Notable works ==
- Jerusalemer Kirche, Friedrichstadt, Berlin (1968)
- Steglitzer Kreisel, Steglitz, Berlin (1968–1974)
- Kurfürstendamm Square, Berlin
