= Bierpinsel =

Restaurant tower in Berlin, Germany

Coordinates: 52°27′41″N 13°19′28″E

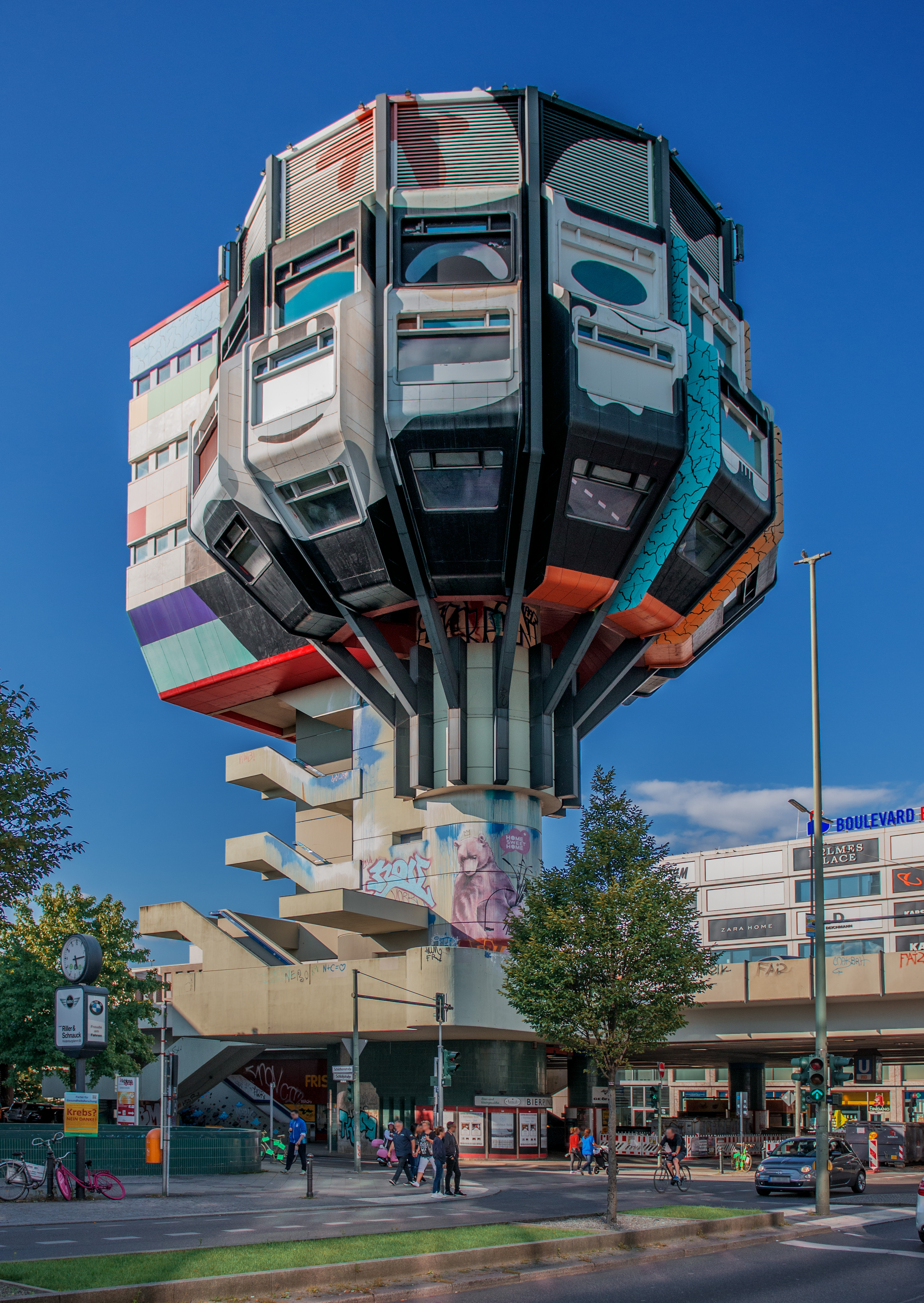
Bierpinsel (2017)

The Bierpinsel (beer brush, in English) is the nickname of a 47-meter-high building built in 1976 and located on Schloßstraße in Steglitz, Berlin. The building is noted for its futuristic architecture. The building has been listed as a protected structure since January 2017.

== History ==
The Steglitz Tower Restaurant, opened on October 13, 1976, and was in construction between 1972 and 1976, by architects Ralf Schüler and his wife Ursulina Schüler-Witte. The architecture is part of the pop art movement. There had been issues with the funding of the initial construction of the building, and it ran over budget more than once.

The building was an extension of the Joachim Tiburtius Bridge. The tower was created out of concrete, plastic cladding and paint. The exterior of the building was originally red around the top section.

The building's popular name, "Bierpinsel," ("beer brush") is a Berlinism coined during the construction period, related to the brush-like appearance of the building's vertical steel girders and its planned gastronomic purpose. A later owner took over the name officially in the company name Bierpinsel GmbH.

The building was sold in 2007 to a new owner who founded a company called Schlossturm GmbH (literally Castle Tower Ltd). That company was sold to the Immoma group in 2021.

The Immoma group had announced to start refurbishing the building in 2023, but no work was done in the following years, with the investor blaming problems with the cultural heritage status and fire protection regulations for the delay. The "beer brush" was still unoccupied and not in use when on 20 September 2026 elements of the buildings cladding came loose and fell down, prompting an intervention by the Berlin fire department to ensure public safety.

== Turmkunst 2010 ==
Starting April 2010, several prominent graffiti artists painted the exterior of the structure over several weeks, as part of the Turmkunst 2010 (English: Tower Art 2010) project - an exhibition of street-art taking place both in and around the tower.
