= Pan (magazine) =

Arts magazine in Berlin, Germany (1895–1915)

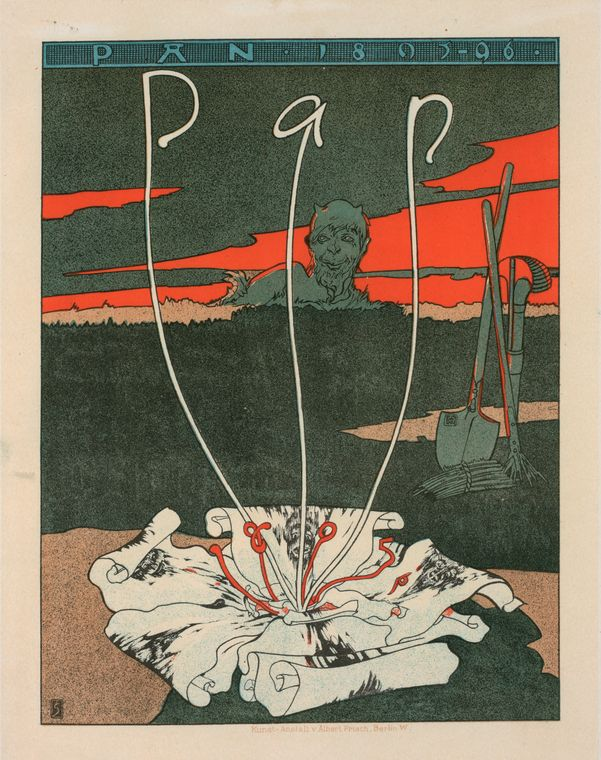
- poster by Joseph Sattler of the art magazine Pan for Les Maîtres de l'Affiche by Jules Chéret
- Categories: Arts magazine
- Frequency: Monthly
- Publisher: Otto Julius Bierbaum; Julius Meier-Graefe
- Founder: Richard Dehmel
- First issue: 1895
- Final issue: 1915
- Country: Germany
- Based in: Berlin
- Language: German

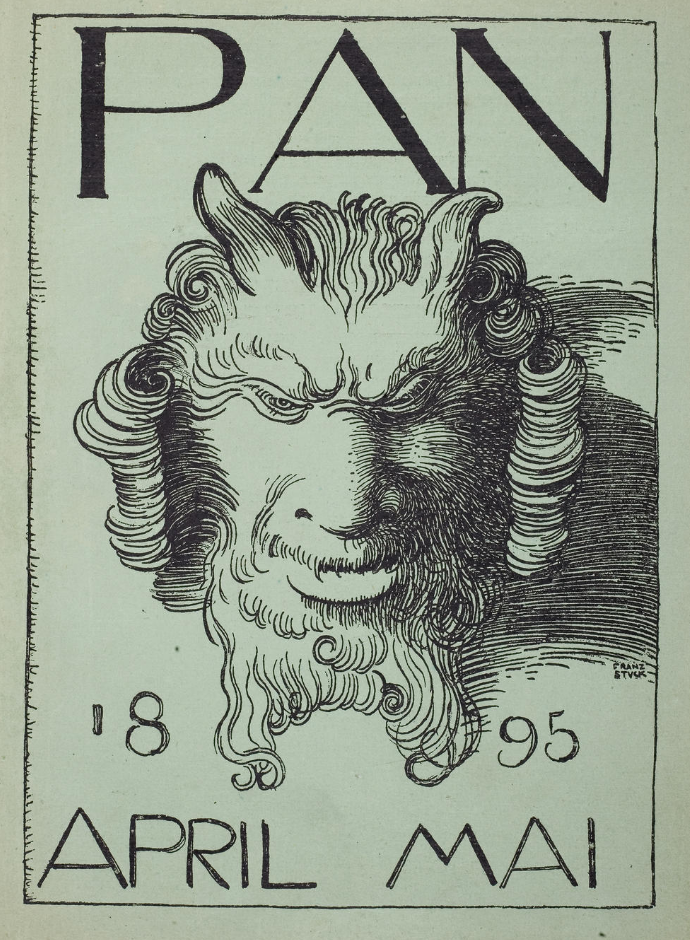
Front cover of the first issue of Pan, April-May 1895, designed by Franz von Stuck

Pan (1895–1915) was a Berlin-based German arts magazine, published by the PAN co-operative of artists, poets and critics. Focused on literature, theatre and music, the magazine published more than 20 issues "without reference to commercial, moral, personal or polemical questions, appreciating only the purely aesthetic viewpoint.” The magazine's mission was democratic in its commitment to Gesamtkunstwerk ("synthesized artwork"), and providing support to young artists of all kinds. To that end, the magazine sold tiered subscriptions: standard and luxury, and quickly "became the most expensive German art magazine of its era." Its artists-first commitment also led to its becoming one of the best representations of pan-European art in the early days of Abstract and Expressionist art.

== 1895 to 1900 ==
Pan was co-founded by Richard Dehmel and published from 1895 to 1900 in Berlin, by Friedrich Fontane's F. Fontane & Co..

The first phase of three issues was influenced by Otto Julius Bierbaum and Julius Meier-Graefe.

The group published 21 issues with 225 artistic supplements. The publication spans 5 volumes, with the first volume, 1895-1896, in five issues and all other volumes in four issues. Heidelberg University Library has book-bound copies with two issues each, while Princeton University Library's Blue Mountain project has individual scanned pages.

Pan was mostly sold on subscription, printing between 1200 and 1600 copies. A standard edition issue in copper plate sold for 75 RM, with a luxury edition on imperial handmade paper that sold for 160 RM, and an artist edition with additional original drawings on various expensive papers which could only be purchased by members of the co-operative sold for 300 RM. In contrast, an annual subscription to the weekly Jugend cost only 24 RM.

== 1910-1912 ==
In 1910, the magazine was revived by Berlin gallery owner and art dealer Paul Cassirer and survived for 3 years. He went on to publish contributors like Frank Wedekind, Georg Heym, Ernst Barlach and Franz Marc with his Pan-Presse imprint. Cassirer's avant-garde taste in print reflected his gallery work. He was the first to exhibit Manet, Cezanne, Van Gogh and Gauguin in Germany, and he championed the work of the Impressionists' German counterparts, also showing Lovis Corinth, Max Liebermann and Lesser Ury.

This group, along with Barlach, Kandinsky, and Beckmann eventually made up the core of the Berlin Secession, artists who rejected traditional art styles then advanced by both academia and officials, and created the foundation of Modernism.

== 1912-1915 ==
In 1912, Alfred Kerr took over the publication of the magazine, and it appeared only sporadically until its demise in 1915.

An influential arbiter of culture, Pan printed stories and poems, in the emerging Symbolist and Naturalist movements, by authors such as Otto Julius Bierbaum, Max Dauthendey, Richard Dehmel and Arno Holz. It also played an important role in the development of German Art Nouveau, by cultivating a stable of both well-known and unknown artists, including Franz von Stuck, Félix Vallotton, and Thomas Theodor Heine.

== Issues ==
- Volume 1

- April 1895
- June 1895
- September 1895
- November 1895
- February 1896

- Volume 2

- July 1896
- October 1896
- November 1896
- April 1897

- Volume 3

- May 1897
- October 1897
- November 1897
- April 1898

- Volume 4

- May 1898
- October 1898
- November 1898
- April 1899

- Volume 5

- August 1899
- November 1899
- February 1900
- April 1900

== See also ==
- Bauhaus
- Gesamtkunstwerk
- List of magazines in Germany
- Jugend magazine
- Secession (art)
- Simplicissimus (magazine)
