= Steglitzer Kreisel =

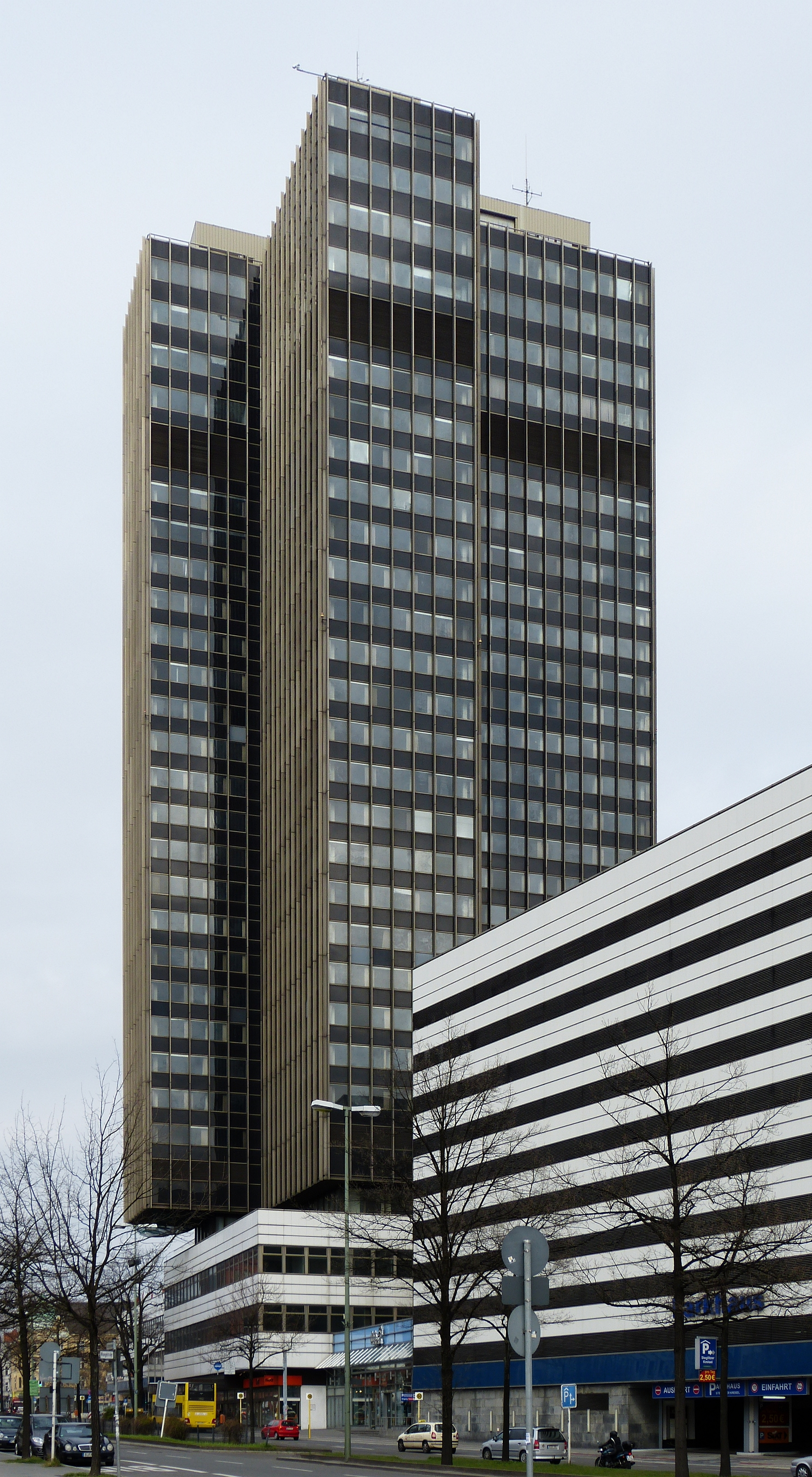
- Steglitzer Kreisel in 2012

General information
- Status: Completed
- Type: Office (former); Residential (current)
- Location: Steglitz, Berlin
- Construction started: 1968
- Completed: 1980
- Opening: 1980
- Cost: 323 million DM
- Owner: Consus Real Estate (since 2020; previously CG Group in 2017, before that Becker & Kries and Land Berlin)

Height
- Roof: 118.5 m (389 ft)

Technical details
- Floor count: 32

Design and construction
- Architect: Sigrid Kressmann-Zschach

The Steglitzer Kreisel also known as the ÜBerlin Tower is a high-rise residential building in the Steglitz district of Berlin, Germany. Originally built between 1968 and 1980, the building stands at 118.5 m (389 ft) tall with 32 floors and is located in the southern area of Schloßstraße diagonally opposite the Steglitz Town Hall.

The main part of the complex is a 120 m high former administration building with 30 floors, one of the highest skyscrapers in Berlin, which housed the Steglitz-Zehlendorf district office until the end of 2007 and which has been empty since then. The base building also houses a BVG bus station with access to the Rathaus Steglitz subway station, a hotel and numerous shops; a parking garage adjoins it. The building is being converted into a residential high-rise as of 2015.

== History ==
=== Planning and construction ===
Construction of the complex began in 1968 according to plans by the architect Sigrid Kressmann-Zschach. The estimated costs of 180 million DM were borne partly by the Berlin Senate and partly by the architect's property development company Avalon. Construction work was stopped again in 1974.

After demolition of the ruins had already been considered, the building was bought at auction in 1977 by Becker & Kries, who completed the roundabout for 95 million marks. After its completion in September 1980, the construction costs for the complex amounted to 323 million DM (adjusted for purchasing power in today's currency: around 395.9 million euros). Until the base was sold in 2015, the Steglitzer Kreisel was owned by the Becker & Kries community (owner of the base) and the State of Berlin (owner of the tower).

Since no tenant could be found for the offices after the high-rise was completed, the Steglitz district office finally moved into the complex. The consortium (Arge) BV: Steglitzer Kreisel consisted of the companies Anton Schmittlein Bauunternehmung, Wiemer & Trachte, FC Trapp, Siemens-Bauunion, Heibus Bauunternehmung, and Sager & Woerner.

It is rumored that a civil defense system was installed in the parking garage for some members of the American armed forces. The architect Ms. Kressmann-Zschach also created such a system in connection with her Ku'damm-Karree project.

=== History of the site ===
The current site of the Steglitzer Kreisel used to be the southern part of the estate village of Stegelitz, which was in a remote peripheral location until the construction of the first paved street in Prussia, later Reichsstraße 1 (afterwards: Bundesstraße 1), in 1792. There were four houses here. In 1801, Carl Friedrich von Beyme bought the estate village and in 1806 abolished the hereditary subservience of the farmers, so that the area became farmers' land.

In 1828 or 1831, Carl Stephani founded an inn on Albrechtstrasse. In June 1840 the Steglitz Railway Theater was opened on its premises. Comedy and musical plays were performed on the stage set up in an octagonal wooden house, including the then famous Karl Unzelmann. The theater only existed for two years.

The inn was taken over by Karl Friedrich Wilhelm Albrecht in 1863 and continued to operate under the name Albrechtshof. According to one source, "a multi-purpose building with a hotel, restaurant and theater" was said to have been built that year, but the first construction work was probably limited to the garden hall and orchestra stage. vermutlich beschränkten sich die ersten Baumaßnahmen aber auf Gartenhalle und Orchesterbühne. In 1871, Albrecht planted an oak tree that still stands today. The Albrechtshof was only significantly expanded in 1904/1905 with the construction of the multi-storey house at Schloßstrasse 82/83. The Albrechtshof-Lichtspiele cinema with 700 seats has also existed here since 1912.

The remaining part of the site remained agricultural. A photo from 1904 shows the Berlinickes' simple farmhouses on Schloßstrasse, while behind the railway line in the Berlinickestrasse area there are already multi-story residential buildings. As late as 1936, the restaurant kept twelve pigs and 500-600 chickens in the Albrechtshof, and residents of the houses directly opposite at Kuhligkshofstrasse 3-5 complained about the noise and the "stench". After severe damage in the Second World War, the cinema was rebuilt in a simplified form in 1948 with only 480 seats and existed until 1967. After that, all buildings on the site were demolished.

The Steglitzer Kreisel was built on the block of the former properties at Schloßstrasse 71–85, Albrechtstrasse 1–6, Kuhligkshofstrasse 1-25 and Birkbuschstrasse 96–98, minus a southern section on which the west tangent was built. Albrechtstrasse and Kuhligkshofstrasse were widened and pivoted towards the block, creating some space for Hermann-Ehlers-Platz and the motorway to be enlarged. Schloßstrasse was also widened. Only the peace oak planted by Albrecht in 1871 in front of the property at Schloßstrasse 81 remained standing and is still there today. The other house numbers, Schloßstrasse 78–82, Albrechtstrasse 1-3 and Kuhligkshofstrasse 1–4, that are used today for the building complex were completely redistributed.

=== The Kreisel affair ===
The project hit the headlines soon after its construction began due to rising construction costs. In 1974, the property's development company had to file for bankruptcy, whereupon construction work was stopped. Due to a guarantee of 42 million marks (adjusted for purchasing power in today's currency: around 66 million euros), the Senate of Berlin had to pay for the debts of the architect Sigrid Kressmann-Zschach. Finance Senator Heinz Striek (SPD) and Construction Senator Rolf Schwedler (SPD) had carelessly trusted the construction project and signed the guarantee. In addition, 35 million marks had been promised for traffic construction in the roundabout and funds had already flowed.

In this context, the public prosecutor's office investigated suspicion of fraud against the architect Sigrid Kressmann-Zschach, but had to end the investigation in 1975 without results. The parliamentary investigative committee that was investigating Heinz Striek and Rolf Schwedler also had to stop its work without any results. Striek was forced to resign in 1975. The chief finance president of the Berlin Finance Directorate, Klaus Arlt, who helped Kressmann-Zschach professionally and was also close to her privately, was suspended from office.

=== Asbestos Exposure ===
In May 1990, the complex, now a Steglitz landmark, hit the headlines again when asbestos was discovered in the high-rise office building. However, these were only removed when damage occurred and therefore only partially. This procedure meant that an expert report had to be prepared by October 2004. The experts came to the conclusion that:

- Parts of the high-rise building would have to be closed by 2007 at the latest,
- Due to the location of the technical center and the escape routes, partial use during the renovation is impossible,
- The costs for a renovation would be 82-84 million euros and
- A new building elsewhere would be possible for just 41.5 million euros.

Two further reports were prepared by June 2005. From them, it emerged that:

- the office tower must be closed at the end of 2007 if asbestos has not been completely removed by then and
- the renovation costs should amount to 75 million euros.

The real estate company Becker & Kries offered to cover the costs and carry out the renovation gradually if the complex continued to be used by the district office.

The vacancy of the Steglitz complex after 2007 cost the Berlin Senate more than 700,000 euros annually (as of 2012) (until it was sold in 2017).

In June 2013, the Senate Department of Finance announced that the costs of asbestos removal could be reduced from the originally estimated 31 million euros to an estimated 20 million euros as a result of an EU-wide tender and the "well-thought-out renovation concept". After the asbestos removal, carried out on behalf of the State of Berlin in 2016, the actual costs were estimated at 18.5 million euros.

=== Usage Plans Prior to 2005 ===
On 27 June 2006, the Berlin Senate decided to abandon the office tower and to accommodate the employees of the Steglitz-Zehlendorf district office in other state-owned properties. The building was therefore vacated on 23 November 2007. The two-year renovation work was supposed to have started in 2009, after the Berlin finance administration and the real estate fund had again tried in vain to sell the building in an unrenovated state. Its future use remained unclear; in addition to the sale to private investors, demolition could not be ruled out, but was very controversial in public.

In 2010, together with the real estate company Becker & Kries, the Senate considered offering the Steglitzer Kreisel complex for sale at the international real estate fair MIPIM in Cannes in March 2010. The costs for the necessary removal of the asbestos alone were estimated at 31.2 million euros at that time.

On 11 November 2010, it was announced that there were two potential buyers: one wanted to buy the complex only after it had been renovated, the other wanted to take on the renovation work for the complex but would receive a contribution towards the costs from the state of Berlin.

The Berliner Zeitung reported on 11 August 2011 that the renovation of the Steglitzer Kreisel should begin "in the summer of next year and be completed in the first half of 2015". In a first step, BIM Berliner Immobilienmanagement had selected a general planner to manage the renovation following a tender. The K5 Arge Generalplanung Steglitzer Kreisel consortium, which includes companies from the fields of building construction, building services, statics and pollutant remediation, was then awarded the contract for planning the asbestos remediation of the Steglitzer Kreisel. What should happen to the building after the renovation, however, remained unknown.

In February 2012, the architect Gert Eckel submitted a new proposal to the Senator for Urban Development for the use of the asbestos-contaminated building, in which he had "shown great interest". According to this, the building was to be used for a limited period of 15 years as a small warehouse, for studios for visual artists and as a meeting place for Jewish culture with a restaurant. The external façade was to be artistically designed in the evenings using laser-light and LED technology.

=== Planned redesign by CG Group ===
At the beginning of 2015, it was announced that the Senate was planning to sell the tower to the CG Group . Initially, there were problems because the CG Group had already purchased the base of the tower from the previous owner Becker & Kries for a purchase price of 45 million euros, and construction work would also have been necessary on this if asbestos removal and fire protection had been improved. If the tower had been sold, renovation would not have been possible. The CG Group came forward as a possible buyer, but initially there were rumors that the company did not have the money to renovate the tower. This would have meant that the tower would remain unused. Later, however, the state of Berlin agreed to the purchase of the tower by the CG Group. On June 30, 2017, the state of Berlin handed the tower over to the new owner (purchase price: 21 million euros).

According to the plans of the CG Group, 330 condominiums are to be built in the former office tower and 180 million euros are to be invested in the tower alone for this purpose. After a complete renovation, the reconstruction of the tower should be completed at the end of 2020 [outdated]. However, more recent plans assumed completion initially at the beginning of 2022, and then in 2024. The designs and reconstruction plans come from the Leipzig architectural firm Fuchshuber Architekten, which has already planned and supervised numerous other (large-scale) construction projects in Berlin. The term "ÜBerlin Tower" was invented for the marketing of the high-rise.

The base buildings are also to be demolished and rebuilt. The new base is to have an outer shell made of glass and stone. There will be space for retail, offices and a medical center. There will also be space for a new hotel. The new buildings are to be completed in 2025. However, in February 2022 it was announced that the investor Adler Group wants to sell the base.

The BVG bus station and Hermann-Ehlers-Platz are also to be redesigned together.

In March 2025, it was announced that parts of the building would be used as a relief-from-cold-weather facility.

== Trivia ==
On Schloßstraße, right next to the Steglitzer Kreisel, stands the Peace Oak, a natural monument of Berlin. On the 24th floor of the roundabout there was a canteen until 2 November 2007 from which, on a clear day, one had a clear view to the north of Berlin's city centre with many sights up to the northern city limits; from the cafeteria one had a view towards the southwest as far as the Fläming Heath.

The office building was used as an outdoor set in the 1984 film Didi – The Doppelgänger with Dieter Hallervorden for the fictional million-dollar company 'Immer International'. The ARD report Ungleichland, broadcast in May 2018, shows the Steglitzer Kreisel as an illustration of Berlin's housing construction and real estate market.

== Gallery ==
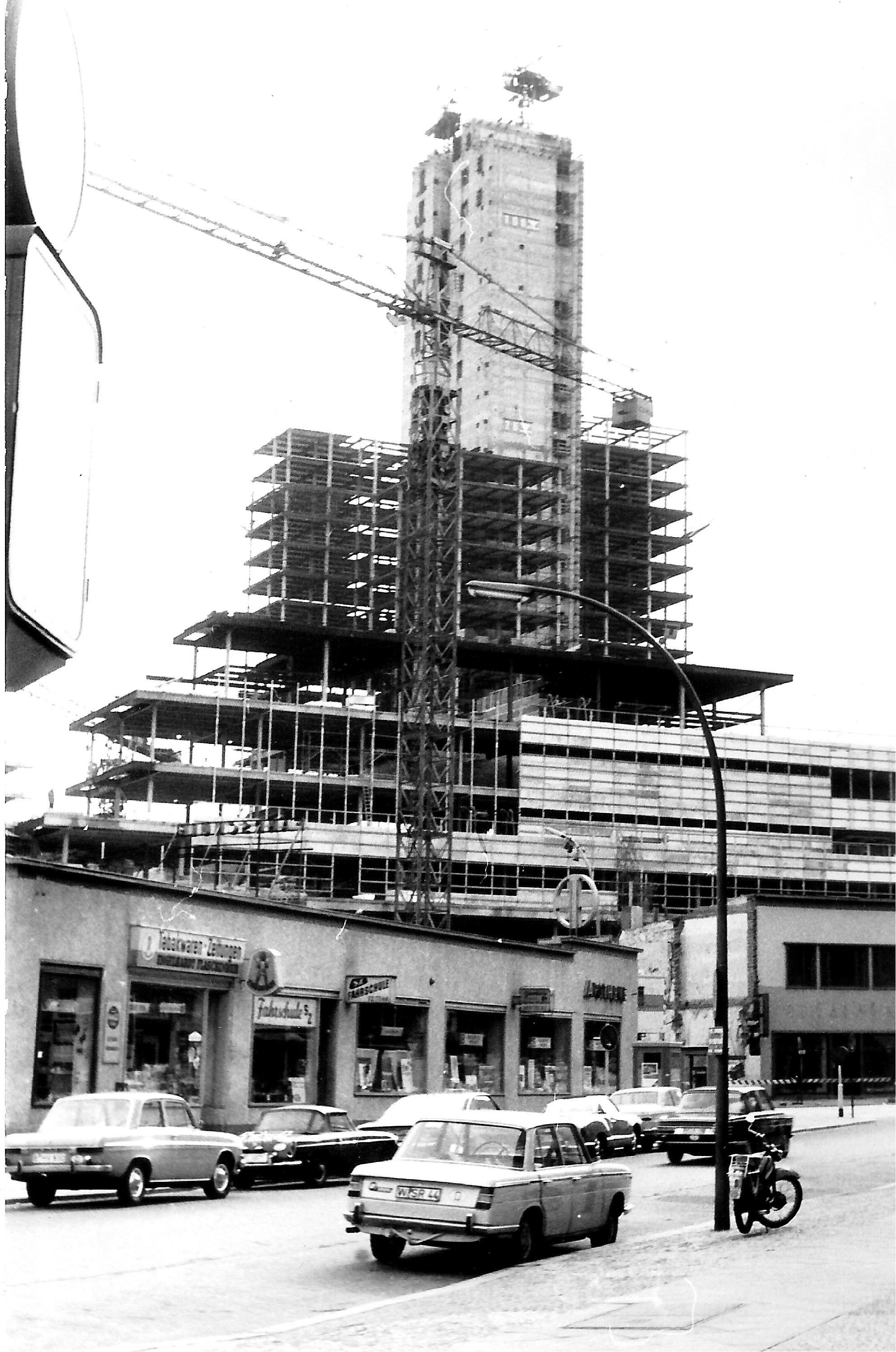
The building under construction in 1973

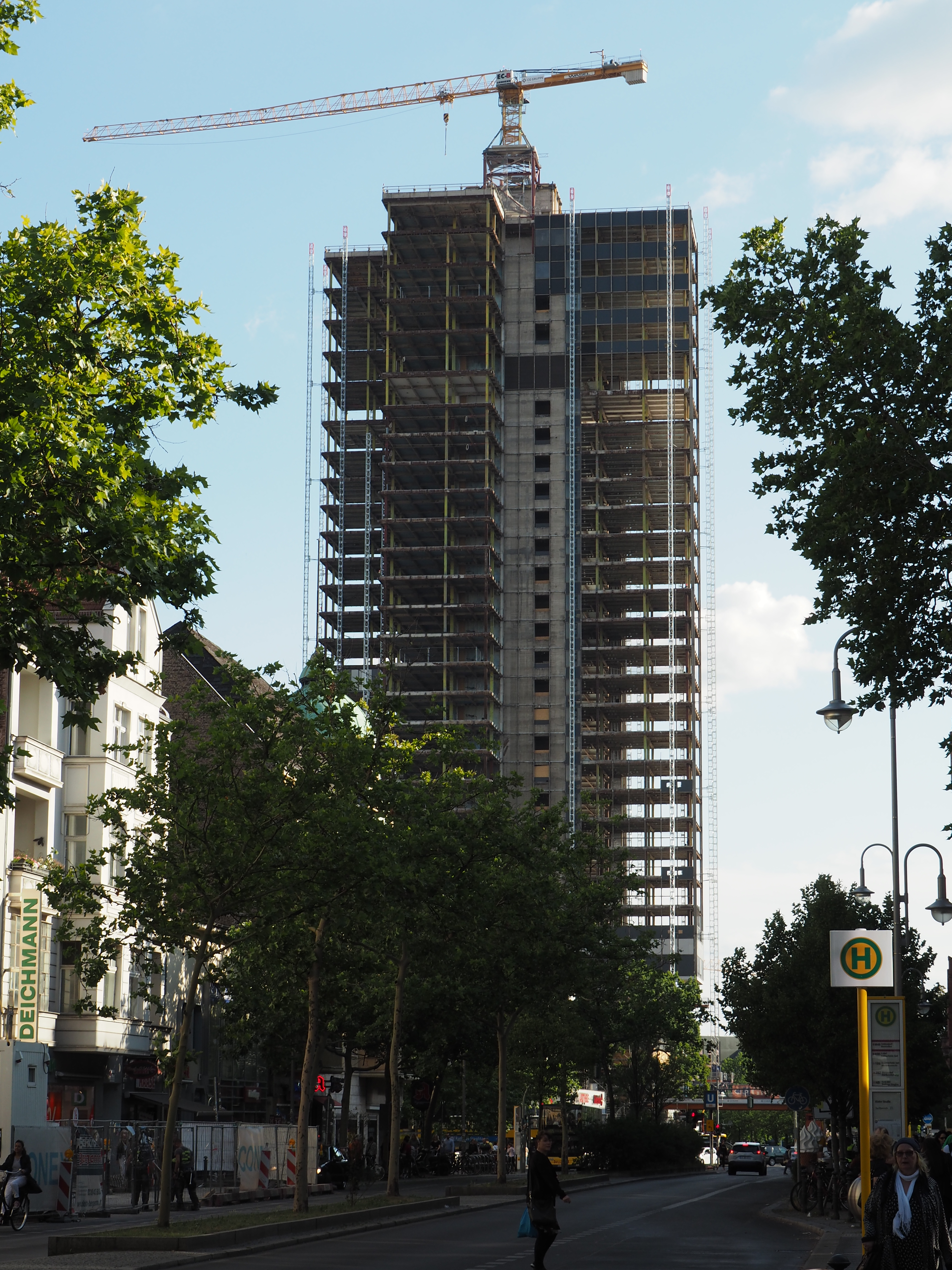
The tower during renovations in 2019...

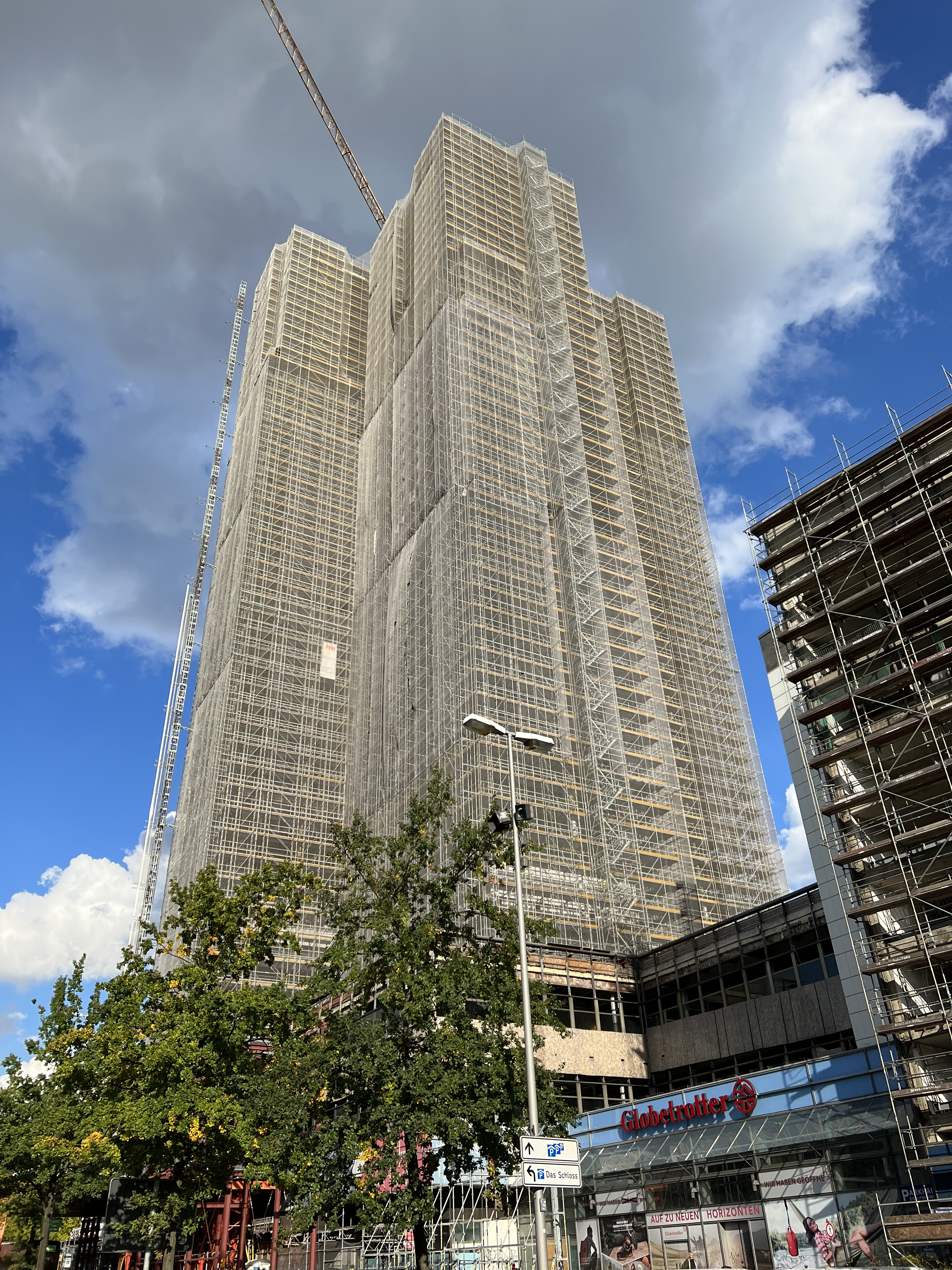
...and in 2022

== See also ==
- List of tallest buildings in Berlin
- List of tallest buildings in Germany
