= Walter Fritzsche =

German footballer

Personal information
- Date of birth: 19 December 1895
- Place of birth: Berlin-Steglitz
- Date of death: 1956
- Position: Defender

Senior career*
Years	Team	Apps	(Gls)
- Vorwärts Berlin

International career
1921	Germany	1	(0)
- * Club domestic league appearances and goals

Walter Fritzsche (19 December 1895 in Berlin-Steglitz – 1956) was a German international footballer.
