= Steglitz =

- Quarter of Berlin
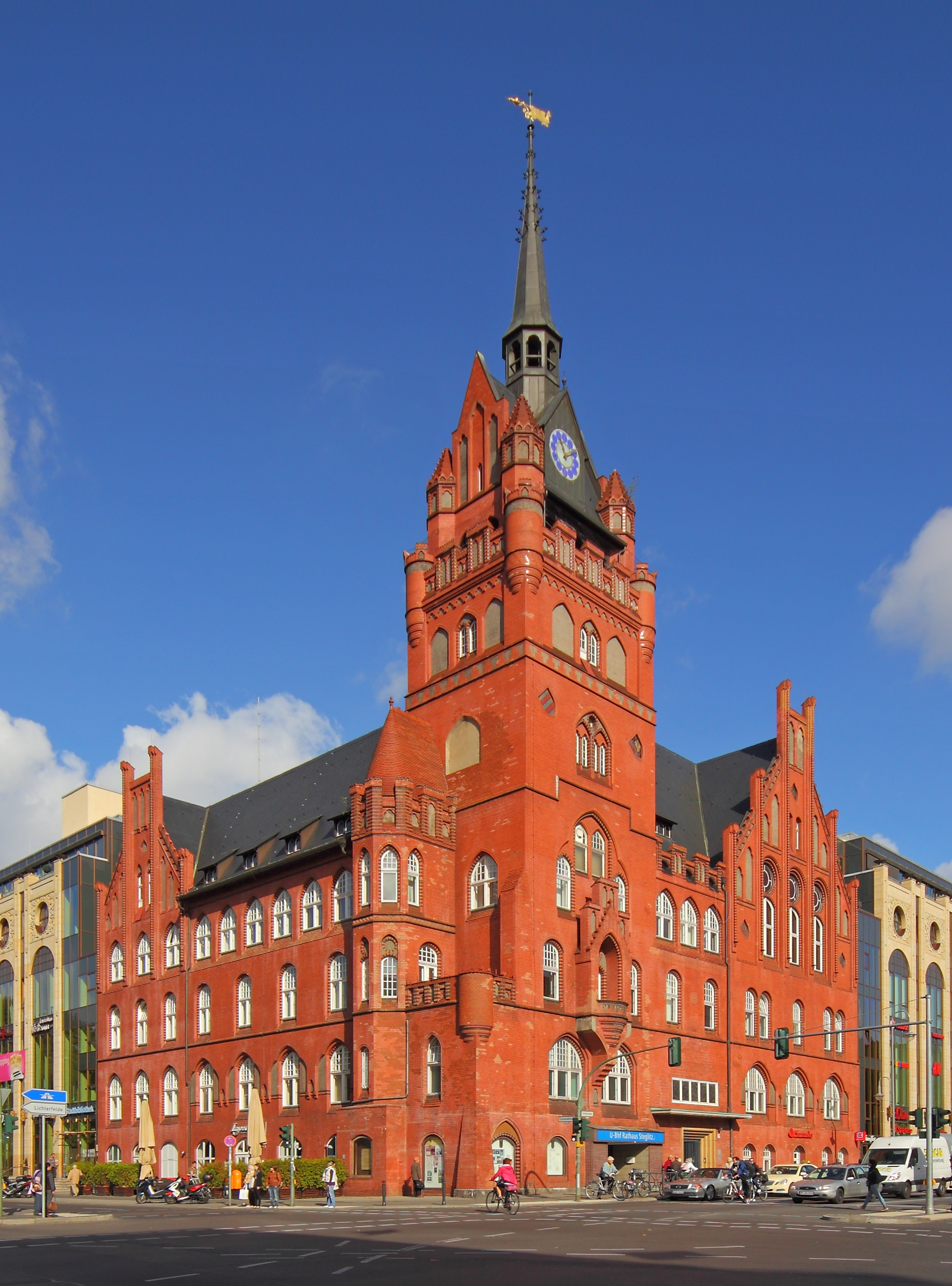
- Town Hall

- Coat of arms

- Location of Steglitz in Steglitz-Zehlendorf and Berlin
- Interactive map of Steglitz
- Location within Germany Location within Berlin
- Coordinates: 52°27′25″N 13°19′14″E
- Country: Germany
- State: Berlin
- City: Berlin
- Borough: Steglitz-Zehlendorf
- Founded: 1792

Area
  - Total: 6.79 km^{2} (2.62 sq mi)
- Elevation: 50 m (160 ft)

Population (2024-12-31)
  - Total: 76,247
  - Density: 11,200/km^{2} (29,100/sq mi)
- Time zone: UTC+01:00 (CET)
  - Summer (DST): UTC+02:00 (CEST)
- Postal codes: 12157, 12161, 12163, 12165, 12167, 12169
- Vehicle registration: B

Steglitz (German: [ˈʃteːɡlɪts]) is a locality of the Steglitz-Zehlendorf borough in Southwestern Berlin, the capital of Germany. Its name is derived from the Slavic name for the European goldfinch, similar to the German Stieglitz.

Steglitz was also a borough from 1920 to 2000. It contained the localities of Steglitz, Südende, Lichterfelde and Lankwitz. In 1960, Südende became a neighborhood within Steglitz.

== History ==
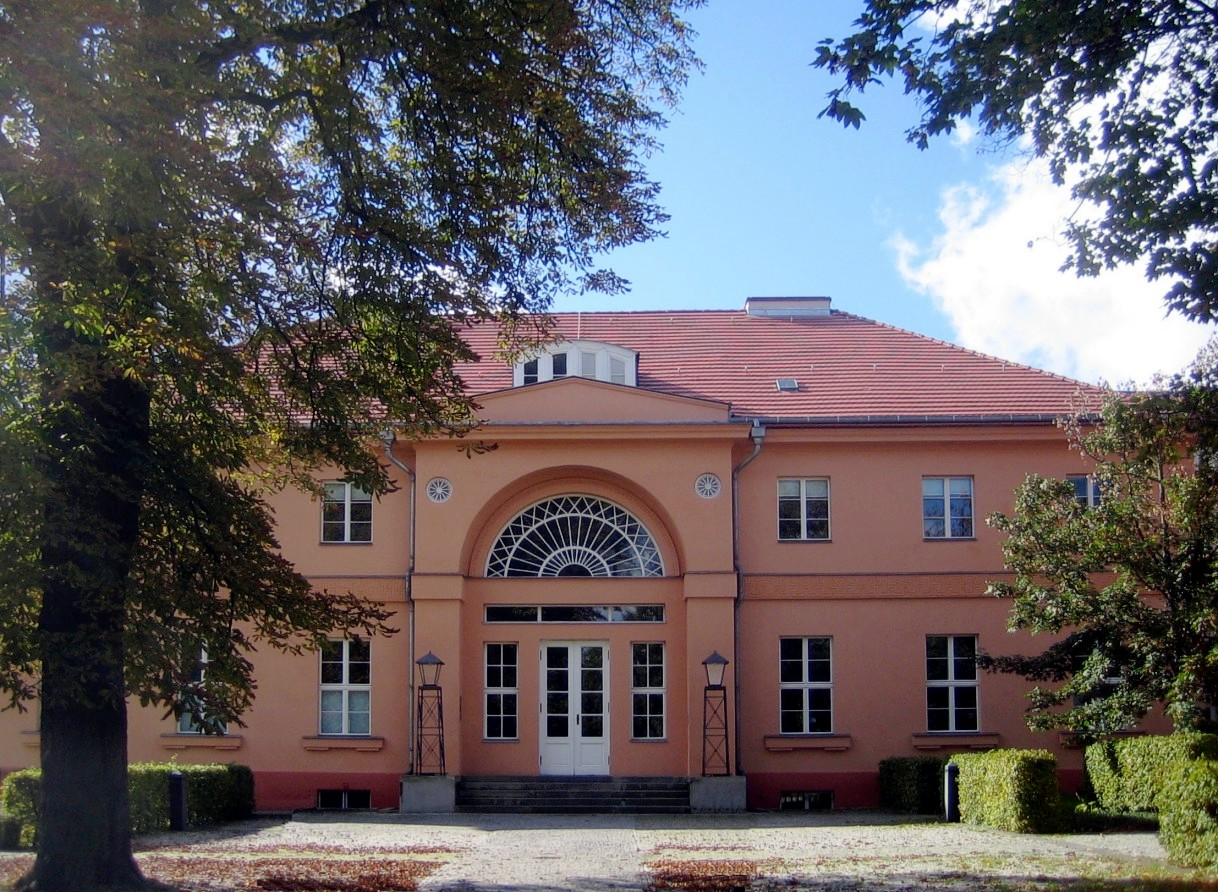
Steglitz Manor (Gutshaus Steglitz)

While one Knight Henricus of Steglitz was already mentioned in an 1197 deed, the village of Steglitz was first mentioned in the 1375 Landbuch of Emperor Charles IV, at this time also ruler of the Electorate of Brandenburg.

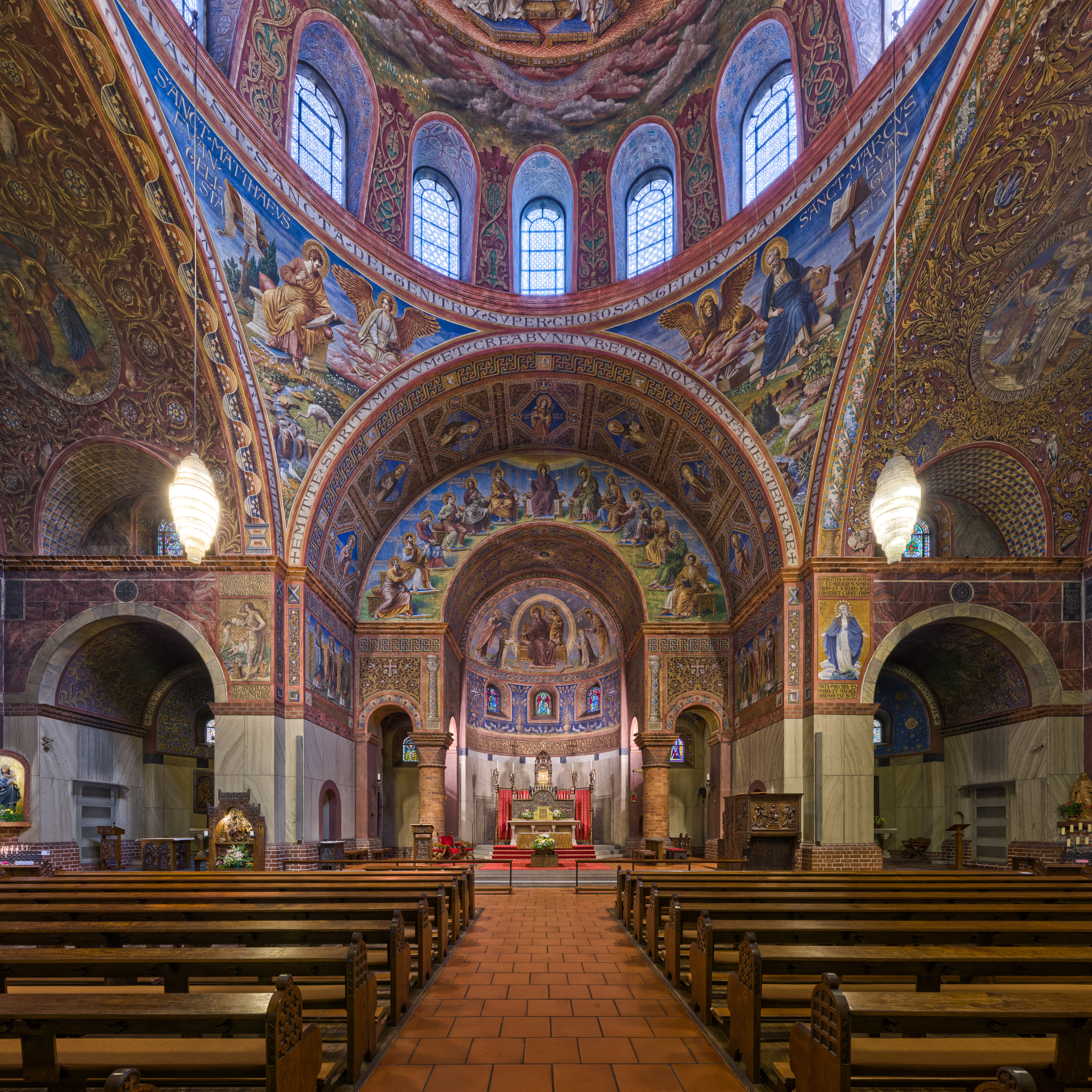
Rosary Church (Rosenkranz-Basilika)

Steglitz witnessed the construction of the first paved Prussian country road, in 1792. The former village profited largely from its location on the Imperial Highway Reichsstraße 1, today Bundesstraße 1, which follows a trading route that dates back to the Middle Ages. The old Reichsstraße stretched from the far west of Germany through Aachen and Cologne to Berlin, then continued on eastward to end some two hundred miles northeast of Königsberg in East Prussia. The village of Steglitz was also boosted significantly with the construction of the Stammbahn line of the Prussian state railways in 1838. This was the first railroad in Prussia and ran between Berlin and Potsdam. The Steglitz area was included in the southern line of Berlin's rail and transit systems from around 1850.

The southwestern surroundings of Berlin saw considerable change in the second half of the 19th century when luxurious residential areas were developed in the neighboring villages of Lichterfelde and later Dahlem. Lichterfelde West and East, founded by the entrepreneur Johann von Carstenn were developed as so called Villenkolonien, settlements made up entirely of mansions or villas. In the east the settlement of Südende ('South End') was founded in 1873. In Steglitz proper a major shopping area developed around the Schloßstraße, catering also to the wealthy villages of Lichterfelde and Dahlem. In 1901 the first Wandervogel youth group was founded in the basement of the Steglitz town hall.

Steglitz was incorporated into the city of Greater Berlin in 1920 together with neighboring villages. From 1920 to 2000, the administrative district IX was called Bezirk Steglitz. Between 1945 and 1990, Steglitz formed part of the American Sector of West Berlin. In Berlin's 2001 administrative reform, the Berlin southwestern area became part of the newly created borough of Steglitz-Zehlendorf, with its expensive residential developments today the most affluent of the twelve Berlin boroughs.

== Points of interest ==
- Gutshaus Steglitz ("Steglitz Manor"), a neoclassical building designed by David Gilly in 1801. From 1921 to 2006, it has housed the small Schlossparktheater, one of the former Berlin state theatres
- The Schloßstraße, the second largest shopping area in West Berlin after Kurfürstendamm and Tauentzienstraße, including Forum Steglitz, one of Germany's first shopping malls opened in 1970
- Rathaus Steglitz (Steglitz town hall), a neo-Gothic building erected in 1898
- Matthew Church, a Lutheran church built in 1880
- Rosenkranz-Basilika ("Rosary Church"), a Catholic church built in 1900 that received the title of a basilica in 1950
- The notorious Steglitzer Kreisel, a 119 m (390 ft) high-rise erected between 1968 and 1980, designed by architect Sigrid Kressmann-Zschach. Before the construction was finished, the developing company became insolvent in 1974, leaving a ruin in the middle of Steglitz until the works were resumed in 1977. To avoid further vacancy the borough's administration moved in but had to leave the building in 2007 due to a contamination with asbestos. The building includes the Berlin U-Bahn station Rathaus Steglitz, a bus station, and a parking garage.
- The Bierpinsel ("Beer Brush"), a tavern in a tower on Schlossstraße with an interesting architectural style built in 1976
- Titania-Palast, a large cinema erected in 1928 in the New Objectivity style. On 26 May 1945, it was the site of the first concert of the Berlin Philharmonic orchestra after World War II. On 6 June 1951, it saw the opening ceremony of the first Berlin International Film Festival
- The Fichtenberg hill, the highest point in Steglitz at 68 m (223 ft).
- The Grundschule am Insulaner, an elementary and middle school near Südende.
- Die Spiegelwand ("Mirrored Wall"), a Holocaust memorial with the names and addresses of 1,700 Jews in the Steglitz area who were deported and murdered in Nazi concentration camps.

== Transport ==
Steglitz is served by the Berlin S-Bahn line S1 at the stations Feuerbachstraße and Rathaus Steglitz as well as by the S25 at Südende. U-Bahn connection to the inner city is provided by the U9 line with the stations Walther-Schreiber-Platz, Schloßstraße and Rathaus Steglitz.

== Notable people ==
- Fredi Bobic (born 1971), football player
- Walter Fritzsche (1895–1956), football player
- Wolfgang Krause (1895–1970), philologist
- Kurt Aland (1915–1994), theologian and biblical scholar
- Andrea Sawatzki (born 1963), actress
- Maria Sebaldt (1930–2023), actress
- Nils Seethaler (born 1981), anthropologist
