= Max Dauthendey =

German painter

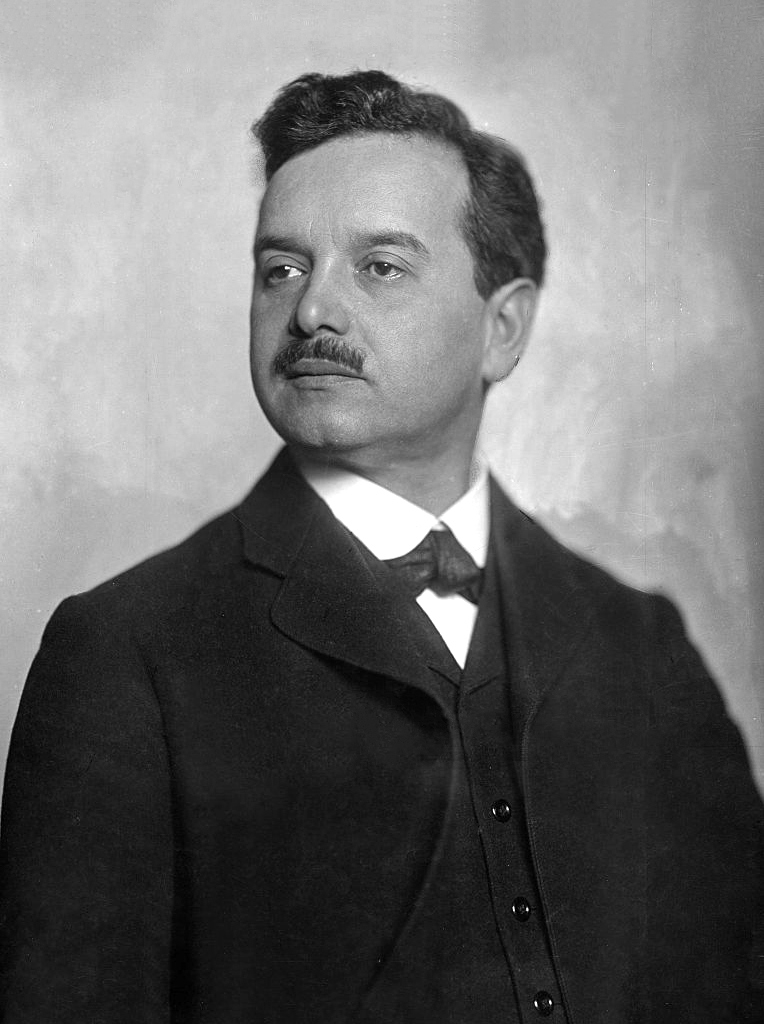
Max Dauthendey by Nicola Perscheid c. 1910.

Max Dauthendey (25 July 1867 – 29 August 1918) was a German author and painter of the impressionist period. He was born in Würzburg and died in Malang. Together with Richard Dehmel and Eduard von Keyserling, he is regarded as one of the most influential authors of that period. Dauthendey was stranded in Java at the outbreak of World War One. Attempts to provide him with a safe passage back to Germany failed.

Dauthendey's birthplace, where the family lived until 1876, was destroyed during the Bombing of Würzburg in World War II.

== See also ==
- List of German painters
