= Helen's Babies (film) =

1924 film by William A. Seiter

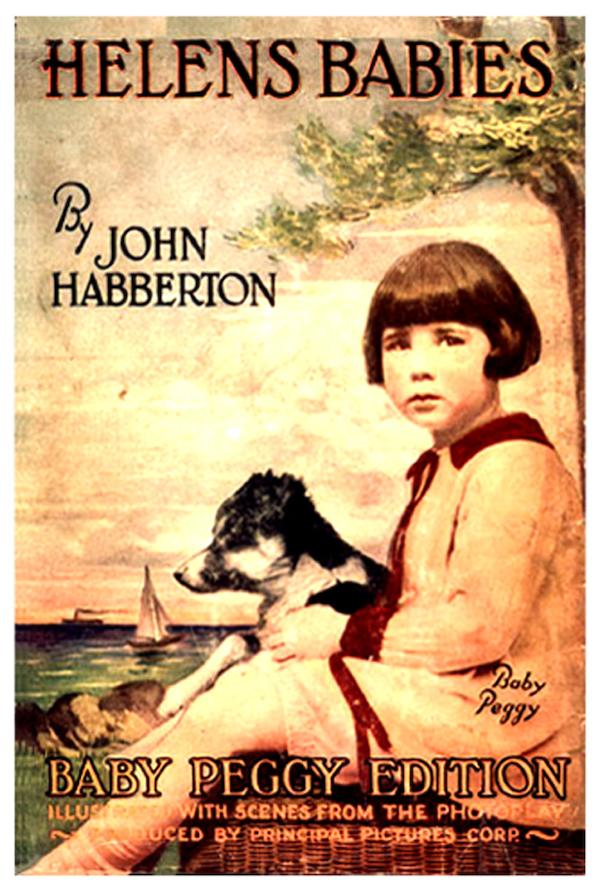
- Directed by: William A. Seiter
- Written by: Louis D. Lighton; Hope Loring
- Based on: Helen's Babies by John Habberton
- Produced by: Sol Lesser
- Starring: Baby Peggy
- Cinematography: William H. Daniels
- Edited by: Owen Marks
- Production company: Sol Lesser Productions
- Distributed by: Principal Distributing
- Release date: October 12, 1924
- Running time: 85 minutes
- Country: United States
- Languages: Silent; English intertitles

Helen's Babies is a 1924 silent comedy film directed by William A. Seiter, based on the 1876 novel Helen's Babies by John Habberton.

== Plot ==
Toddie and Budge are identified as the two best children in the world. They enjoy a comfortable life with their parents Tom and Helen Lawrence. Helen's brother is Harry Burton, a wealthy bachelor who, although never having had one, is an expert on knowing how to raise children. When Tom and Helen receive a letter from Harry, in which he announces he will travel to them for a vacation, they see an opportunity to get a break from the kids. Knowing that Harry is an expert on children, they assume that he will appreciate the gesture and leave just after he arrives. Unbeknownst to them, Harry only wrote a book about raising children because his publisher told him to, and actually he is not fond of children at all. He reluctantly takes the position as the babysitter of his nieces and is escorted by Alice Mayton, the Lawrence's attractive neighbor.

It soon becomes clear that Harry will not get any rest, as the careless girls often annoy him by getting themselves into danger or going through his possessions. Many of the dangerous situations Toddie gets herself into include climbing a tree and attempting to shave herself. Although they always try to help him out, Toddie and Budge only make things worse. Harry is only irritated by their constant attempts to comfort him and is not able to take advantage of his own advice on raising children. He writes Helen a letter, in which he threatens to abandon the girls if she does not return immediately. However, before he is able to send it he is interrupted by a visit from Alice. Alice has always been a big admirer of his work, but notices that he is not a real expert on parenting. Giving him the benefit of the doubt, she invites him over for dinner.

Harry, secretly having a crush on Alice, accepts the invitation and shreds the letter into pieces. He wants to win over her affection at dinner and buys some fancy flowers. Unbeknownst to him, Toddie had secretly replaced the flowers with her doll. As he hands Alice the box, she is surprised to receive the doll, but thinks of it as a comic gesture. While Harry and Alice grow closer, the children run away to follow a dog they notice. Harry and Alice immediately start to look for them and they cross a group of Spanish gypsies. Noticing a piece of clothing on the ground belonging to one of the girls, Harry suspects that they have kidnapped the girls and violently starts to look for them.

Meanwhile, the girls are playing with the dog on the railroad tracks and are almost hit by a train. Coincidentally, Tom and Helen are traveling on that train to surprise the girls with an early return. They are devastated that their daughters almost died and think that Harry is fully responsible. They start yelling at Harry, until they find out how fond the daughters are of him. The film ends with Harry and Alice kissing each other.

== Cast ==
- Edward Everett Horton as Uncle Harry Burton
- Baby Peggy as Toddie
- Clara Bow as Alice Mayton
- Jeanne Carpenter as Budge
- Claire Adams as Helen Lawrence
- Richard Tucker as Tom Lawrence
- George Reed as Rastus, the coachman
- Mattie Peters as Mandy, the housekeeper

== Preservation ==
- The film is preserved at Cineteca Italiana in Milan, Gosfilmofond or Moscow, The Library of Congress, BFI National Film and Television and UCLA Film and Television Archive.
