= Riding Down from Bangor (song) =

1871 song

"Riding Down from Bangor" is a song, written by 1871, about a train journey from Bangor, Maine.

== Text ==
The words, as published with music in The Scottish Students' Song Book (1897), are:

Riding down from Bangor, on an eastern train
After weeks of hunting, in the woods of Maine
Quite extensive whiskers, beard, moustache as well
Sat a student fellow, tall and slim and swell
Empty seat behind him, no one at his side
Into quiet village, eastern train did glide
Enter aged couple, take the hindmost seat
Enter village maiden, beautiful, petite
Blushingly she faltered, “Is this seat engaged?”
Sees the aged couple, properly enraged
Student’s quite ecstatic, sees her ticket through
Thinks of the long tunnel, thinks what he will do
Pleasantly they chatted, how the cinders fly!
Till the student fellow, gets one in his eye
Maiden sympathetic, turns herself about
“May I if you please sir, try to get it out?”
Then the student fellow, feels a gentle touch
Hears a gentle murmur, “Does it hurt you much?”
Whiz! Slap! Bang! Into tunnel quite
Into glorious darkness, black as Egypt’s night
Out into the daylight glides that eastern train
Student’s hair is ruffled, just the merest grain
Maiden seen all blushes when then and there appeared
A tiny little earring, in that horrid student’s beard.

== History and variants ==
"Riding Down from Bangor" was a poem written by Louis Shreve Osborne in 1871 while attending Harvard. The text mentions the Eastern Railroad which ceased only a few years later in 1884 when it became part of the Boston and Maine. At some early point, Osborne's poem was set to music. It was recorded as a traditional song in 1934 by Frank Crumit and in 1950 by the husband and wife duo Marais & Miranda.

It is the same poem as "The Harvard Student", also titled "The Pullman Train" (attributed to Louis Shreve Osborne, 1871) by Doney Hammontree.

== Orwell essay ==
"Riding Down from Bangor" is also the title of an essay published in 1946 by the English author George Orwell. In it, he muses on 19th-century American children's literature and the type of society it portrayed.

== Not to be confused ==
The song should not be confused with the folk style song "Day Trip to Bangor", a 1980 hit by Fiddler's Dram about "the day we went to Bangor" in Wales.
