= Alfons Paquet =

German author (1881–1944)

Alphons Hermann Paquet (26 January 1881 – 8 February 1944) was a German writer, poet and journalist.

== Biography ==
Alphons Paquet was born in to the family of a deeply religious Baptist glovemaker and was forced to train in his father's profession. In 1900 he won a prize for a short story and decided to move to Berlin and become a journalist. In 1901 he published his first volume of short stories and the following year a book of poems and songs. Soon after, he became editor of the Düsseldorf-based cultural magazine Die Rheinlande and from 1902 onwards he was able to finance his studies with various jobs, which he completed in 1907 at the University of Jena with a dissertation in economic history.

In 1903, Paquet began traveling, which would determine his entire subsequent life. He traveled through Siberia on the newly opened Trans-Siberian Railway. The following year, he traveled to the US for the Louisiana Purchase Exposition. This year also saw the start of his work for the Frankfurter Zeitung.

On October 18, 1910, he married the Frankfurt painter Marie Henriette Steinhausen and moved with her to Dresden- Hellerau, where Paquet now worked for the German Werkbund.

In the years leading up to the First World War, Paquet made several trips to Mongolia and China, a trip on the Baghdad Railway to Syria and various other destinations.

In 1915, Paquet became a correspondent for the Frankfurter Zeitung in neutral Stockholm. From here, he observed events in Russia and in 1918 undertook a reconnaissance of civil war-torn Finland. In the summer of the same year, he went to Moscow to witness and report on the Bolshevik Revolution.

Paquet became a supporter of the Weimar Republic and was deeply interested in the idea of a "Rhineland" renewal of Europe with Germany as a mediator between East and West. He envisioned a pacifist Germany in a European Union.

In the 1920s, Paquet wrote more for the theater. His plays Fahnen and Sturmflut were performed by Erwin Piscator at the Berlin Volksbühne. In 1925, he founded the "Bund Rheinischer Dichter" with Jakob Kneip and remained its chairman until 1933.

In 1932, Paquet was admitted to the Prussian Academy of Arts. In Frankfurt, he presented the Goethe Prize as a representative of the city; he was the secretary of the foundation's board of trustees for several years. After the Nazis seized power, he resigned from the academy because he did not sign the required declaration of conformity to the hew regime. He managed to secure his income as a journalist, and in 1934 he made extensive flights through Europe, about which he published a travel book. In 1935 he was briefly arrested in Berlin for because he was considered to be a communist by the Nazis.

As a convinced pacifist, he became a permanent member of the Quakers in 1933. Through this religious community, he maintained intensive contact with England and the US and received visits from foreign believers who wanted to get an idea of the situation in Germany.

In 1943, his youngest son was killed on the Eastern Front. Paquet, who had to witness the deportation of the Jews from Frankfurt - of whose murderous consequences he was aware - as a helpless observer, sank into deep dejection. During a bombing raid in February 1944, Alfons Paquet died of a heart attack in the basement of his house.

== Works ==
- Lieder und Gesänge. Mit einer Vorbemerkung von Carl Busse. Grote, Berlin 1902, online – Internet Archive
- Das Ausstellungsproblem in der Volkswirtschaft. Fischer, Jena 1908 (= Abhandlungen des staatswissenschaftlichen Seminars zu Jena, Band 5, Heft 2)
- Südsibirien und die Nordwestmongolei. Politisch-geographische Studie und Reisebericht für die Geographische Gesellschaft zu Jena. Fischer, Jena 1909
- Kamerad Fleming. Rütten & Loening, Frankfurt am Main 1911; Neuausgabe: Edition AV, Frankfurt am Main 2004, ISBN 978-3-936049-32-9
- Li oder im neuen Osten. Rütten & Loening, Frankfurt am Main 1912
- Erzählungen an Bord. Rütten & Loening, Frankfurt am Main 1914
- In Palästina. Diederichs, Jena 1915
- Im kommunistischen Russland. Briefe aus Moskau. Diederichs, Jena 1919
- Der Geist der russischen Revolution. Wolff, Leipzig 1919; Reprint: BiblioBazaar, Charleston SC 2009, ISBN 978-1-116-45489-5
- Der Rhein als Schicksal oder Das Problem der Völker. Wolff, München 1920
- Der Rhein, eine Reise. Societäts-Druckerei, Frankfurt am Main 1923
- Amerika. Hymnen/Gedichte. Die Wölfe, Leipzig 1925
- Lusikas Stimme, Novelle. 1925, Deutsche Verlagsanstalt Stuttgart, Berlin und Leipzig
- Antwort des Rheines. Eine Ideologie. Filser, Augsburg 1928
- Der Neckar. Ein Lebensbild, mit Zeichnungen von Joachim Lutz, J.Horning/Heidelberg 1928
- Der Rhein. In Fritz Taeuber, Grieben Grenzlandführer für die wandernde Jugend: Rheinische Grenzlande. Von Eupen zur Saar. Grieben-Verlag Albert Goldschmidt, Berlin 1931
- Fluggast über Europa. Ein Roman der langen Strecken. Knorr & Hirth, München 1920–1933
- Amerika unter dem Regenbogen. Farben – Konturen – Perspektiven. Societät, Frankfurt 1938
- Der Rhein. Vision und Wirklichkeit. Fotos von Paul Wolff. Bagel, Düsseldorf 1940
- Die Botschaft des Rheins. Erlebnis und Gedicht. Henn, Ratingen 1941
- Die Frankfurterin. Kramer, Frankfurt 1947; 2. erw. A. 1970
- Gaswelt und vier andere Essays, Köln 1940, 2. Auflage
- Gedichte. Hrsg. v. Alexander von Bernus. Wallstein, Göttingen 1956, ISBN 978-3-89244-157-1
