= John Habberton =

American novelist

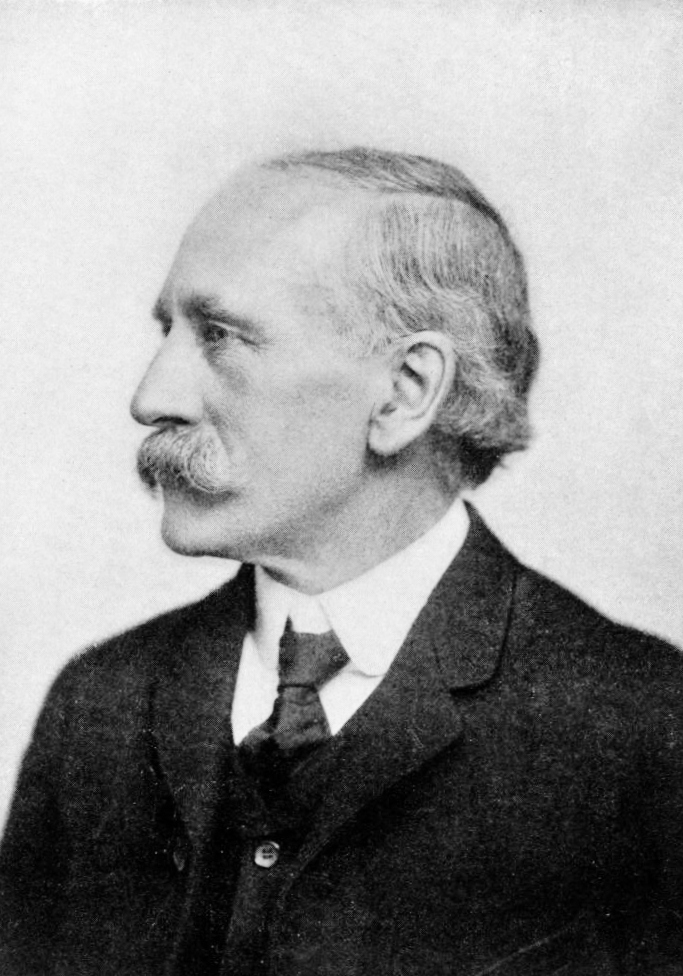
John Habberton

John Habberton (February 24, 1842 – February 24, 1921) was an American author and journalist.

== Biography ==
He was born at Brooklyn, New York, and educated in the public schools of Illinois, where he went to live with an uncle after his father died when he was six years old. He served in the army during the Civil War. After the war, he got a job with Harper & Brothers, where he stayed until 1872. After an unsuccessful attempt to become a publisher himself, in 1873 he became literary editor of the Christian Union (later called Outlook), where he remained until 1877. From 1876 to 1893, he was literary critic on the staff of the New York Herald.

== Helen's Babies ==
Habberton's first major work of fiction was Helen's Babies, based on his sons' adventures (published in 1876 by Loring Publisher, Boston, in 1877 by David Byce and Son, Glasgow, and in 1878 by William Mullan, London. It was revived in the early 20th century by George Routledge and Sons, London). The work was initially rejected, but finally published anonymously. Later the author's identity was revealed. The novel is subtitled With some account of their ways, innocent, crafty, angelic, impish, witching and impulsive; also a partial record of their actions during ten days of their existence.

The book was one of the Ruby Books series for boys and girls. Habberton is acknowledged as the author of the book in an advertisement within the 1903 edition of Andersen's Fairy Tales published by Routledge. Habberton is acknowledged, also, in an inexpensive cardboard-back edition of Helen's Babies published by (and copyrighted by) Whitman Publishing Company of Racine, Wisconsin, in 1934. That edition is copiously illustrated by Pauline Adams.

Helen's Babies was intended as just a piece of humour and aimed at an adult audience, but it almost instantly became a major juvenile literature success, highly estimated by youngsters, as well as Rudyard Kipling. Its popularity dwindled somewhat after World War II (although George Orwell mentions it favorably in his 1946 essay on early American literature, "Riding Down from Bangor"). It regained some interest in the 1980s. It was translated into numerous foreign languages and was adapted into a 1924 film of the same name, directed by William A. Seiter.

== Other work ==
Habberton is also known for his stories about early California life, many of which were collected in his 1880 book Romance of California Life: Illustrated by Pacific Slope Stories, Thrilling, Pathetic and Humorous (New York: Baker, Pratt & Co., 1880).

He was also known under the pseudonym "Smelfungus."

== Personal life ==
In 1868, he married Alice Lawrence Hastings, who later suggested recording their sons' adventures.

== Partial bibliography ==
- All He Knew
- Helen's Babies (1876)
- The Annals of a Baby, by One of Its Slaves (1877)
- He and I, by the author of "Annals of a Baby" (1877)
- The Barton Experiment, by the author of "Helen's Babies" (1877)
- The Jericho Road; A Story of Western Life (1877)
- Romance of California Life: Illustrated by Pacific Slope Stories, Thrilling, Pathetic and Humorous (1880)
- The Worst Boy in Town (1880)
- Helen's Babies and Mrs. Mayburns Twins (1881)
- Canoeing in Kanuckia
- Other People's Children (1877)
- Country Luck (1887)
- The Scripture Club of Valley Rest
- The Barton Experiment
- Trif and Trixie: a story of a dreadfully delightful little girl and her adoring and tormented parents, relations, and friends - copyright 1897- Published by Henry Altemus
- Caleb Wright; A Story of the West (1901)
