= Helen's Babies (novel) =

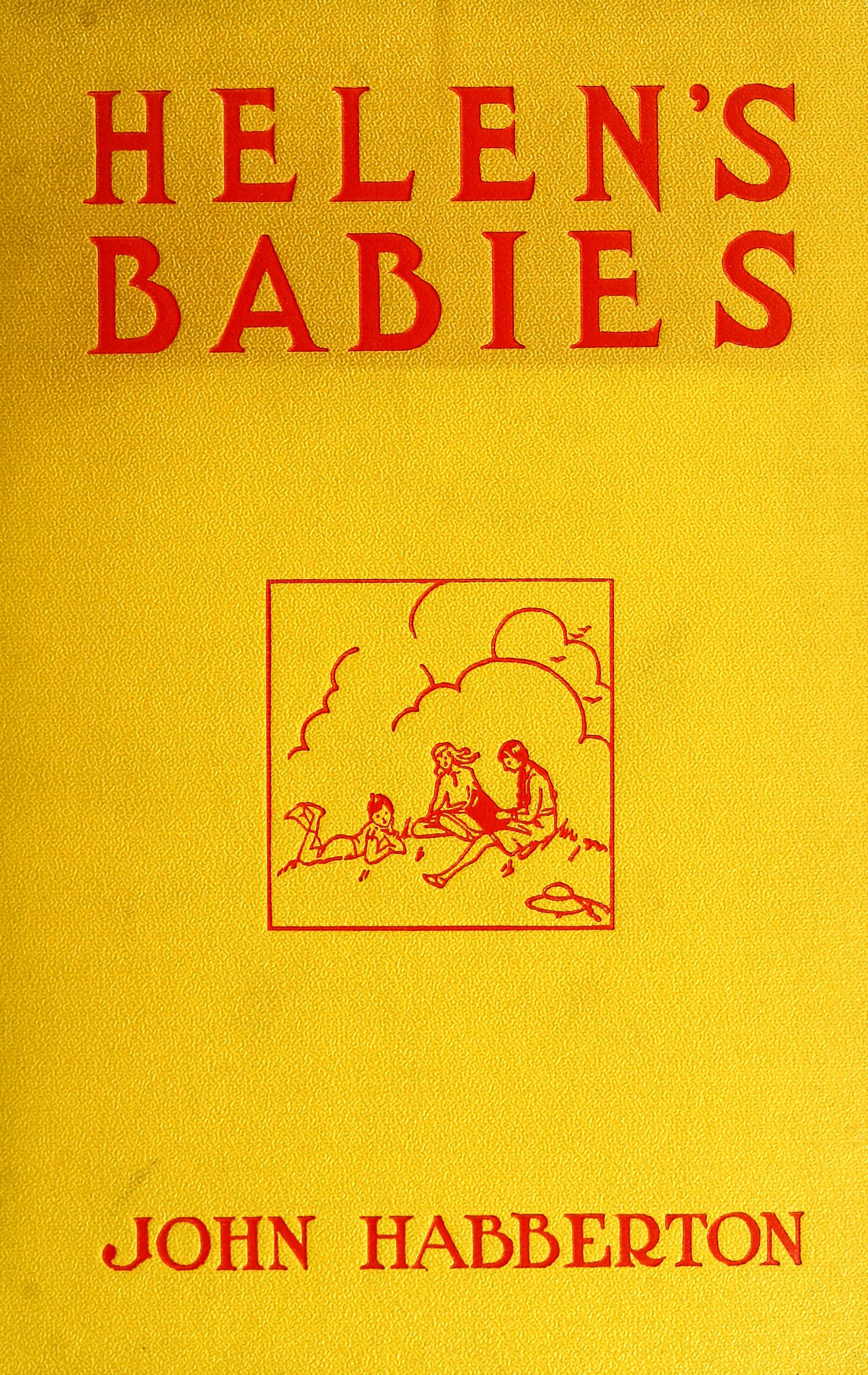
1908 edition cover

Helen's Babies is a humorous novel by American journalist and author John Habberton, first published in 1876.

The book's full title is: Helen's Babies: With Some Account of Their Ways Innocent, Crafty, Angelic, Impish, Witching, and Repulsive, Also, a Partial Record of Their Actions During Ten Days of Their Existence.

In its early editions the author was noted anonymously as "By Their Latest Victim".

== Criticism ==
G. K. Chesterton included an essay on Helen's Babies in his collection Generally Speaking.

The book is cited in George Orwell's 1945 essay "Good Bad Books" as an example of "the kind of book that has no literary pretensions but which remains readable when more serious productions have perished." It is also discussed by Orwell in his 1946 essay "Riding Down from Bangor", in which he muses on 19th-century American children's literature and the type of society it portrayed.

== Adaptations ==
The book was adapted for the stage, and played at the Broadway Theatre in New York in 1878, and elsewhere.

Helen's Babies was also adapted into a film of the same name in 1924, directed by William A. Seiter.
