= Riding Down from Bangor (essay) =

1946 essay by George Orwell

Riding Down from Bangor is an essay published in 1946 by the English author George Orwell. In it, he muses on 19th-century American children's literature and the type of society it portrayed.

== Background ==
The article was prompted by the appearance of a new edition of Helen's Babies by the American author John Habberton. The novel first published in 1876 was subtitled: "Helen's Babies with some account of their ways...innocent, crafty, angelic, impish, witching and repulsive by THEIR LATEST VICTIM." and was set in New York.

The article appeared in Tribune on 22 November 1946.

== Summary ==
The appearance of Helen's Babies prompts Orwell's thoughts about the impression of the world made by books read in childhood. His impressions of America came down to the barefoot boy in the schoolroom aspiring to become president, and the tall man leaning against a wooden paling making occasional observations. These ideas were derived from books like Tom Sawyer, Rebecca of Sunnybrook Farm, What Katy Did, and Little Women. He then thinks of the song "Riding down from Bangor" based on a railway journey from Bangor, Maine.

Orwell identifies these works as having a "sweet innocence" and "faint vulgarity of language". Although he acknowledges a crude and anarchic element in many American works, he notes that novels set on the East Coast describe a very sedate and prim society governed by etiquette. The characters may seem ridiculous, but they have an admirable integrity and unthinking piety. Orwell regrets that more recent American material such as Superman and other comic books is no longer suitable for children.

Seeing nineteenth century America as a "rich empty country" with few social problems and room for everyone who worked hard, Orwell concludes that "the civilization of nineteenth century America was capitalist civilization at its best."

== See also ==
- Bibliography of George Orwell
