= Richard Dehmel =

German poet and writer (1863–1920)

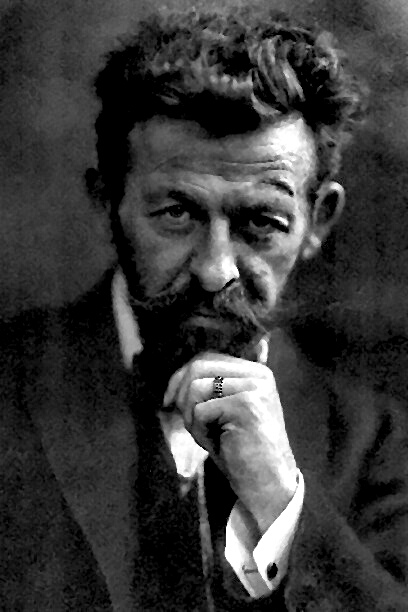
- Dehmel in 1905
- Born: Richard Fedor Leopold Dehmel; 18 November 1863; Hermsdorf near Wendisch Buchholz, Brandenburg, Prussia
- Died: 8 February 1920 (aged 56); Blankenese, Schleswig-Holstein, Germany
- Occupations: Poet, writer
- Writing career
- Language: German
- Genres: Poetry, fiction

Richard Fedor Leopold Dehmel (German: [ˈdeːməl]; 18 November 1863 – 8 February 1920) was a German poet and writer.

== Life ==
A forester's son, Richard Dehmel was born in Hermsdorf near Wendisch Buchholz (now part of Münchehofe) in the Brandenburg Province, Kingdom of Prussia.

He got his first impressions of nature wandering the oak forests tended by his father, and first attended school in his hometown. He then attended the Sophiengymnasium (a Berlin gymnasium) yet was expelled after clashing with the headteacher. He finished his school days in Danzig (today Gdańsk, Poland) and subsequently studied the natural sciences, economics, literature, and philosophy, first at Friedrich Wilhelm University in Berlin and then at Leipzig University, where he obtained a doctorate in economics with a thesis on the insurance industry. He then worked as a secretary at a fire insurance association, and remained in this position until, after the publication of his second volume of poetry, he turned full-time writer.

In 1889, Dehmel married Paula Oppenheimer, sister of Franz Oppenheimer. He became active as a writer and co-founded Pan magazine in 1894.

Dehmel's poetic volume Weib und Welt (Woman and World) triggered a scandal in the late 1890s: denounced by the deeply conservative poet Börries von Münchhausen, Dehmel was tried for obscenity and blasphemy. Despite being acquitted on technical grounds, the court condemned the work as obscene and blasphemous and ordered that it be burned. Dehmel would again be prosecuted for obscenity and blasphemy, but again acquitted as earlier.

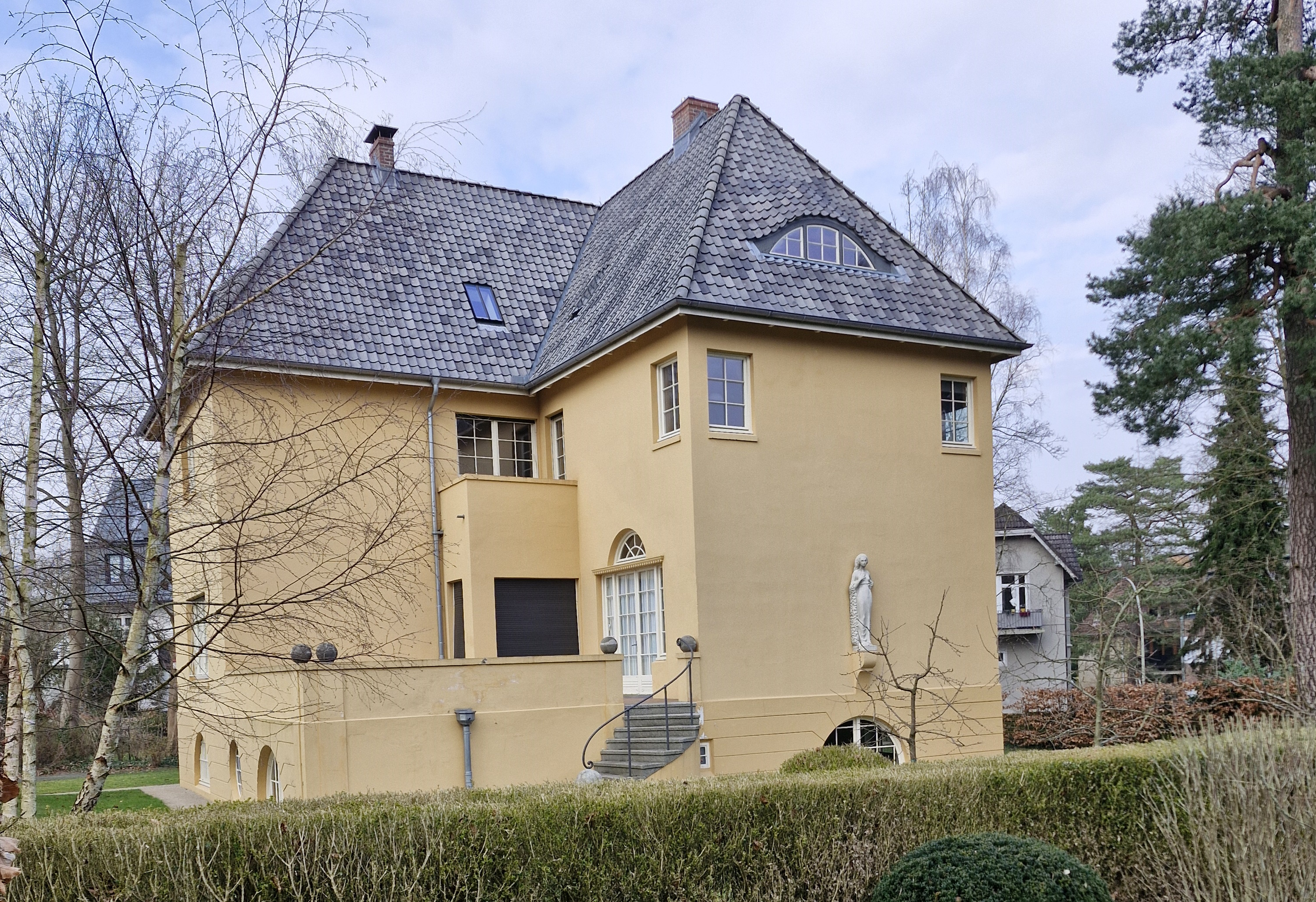
Dehmel House, Hamburg. Walther Baedeker architect 1911-13

Dehmel divorced Paula in 1899 and traveled Europe with Ida Auerbach (née Coblentz), who had formerly been engaged to Dehmel's rival Stefan George. Dehmel married Ida in 1901, and that same year they settled in Hamburg. In 1912 they moved as tenants into a house which they had helped design, but which was financed by the architect Walther Baedeker. The house was given to the poet the following year by friends and admirers for his 50th birthday, a sign of their esteem. Significantly, among these 69 sponsors were upper-middle-class benefactors such as Eduard Arnhold Walther Rathenau , the publishers Paul Cassirer, Samuel von Fischer, and Gustav Kirstein, writers Thomas Mann, Stefan Zweig, Hugo von Hofmannsthal, Arthur Schnitzler, and Julius Meier-Graefe, painter Max Liebermann, photographer Minya Diez-Dührkoop, architects Peter Behrens and Henry van de Velde, also Elisabeth Förster-Nietzsche, Albert Ballin, and, at the initiative of the art historian Aby Warburg, the Warburg banking family.

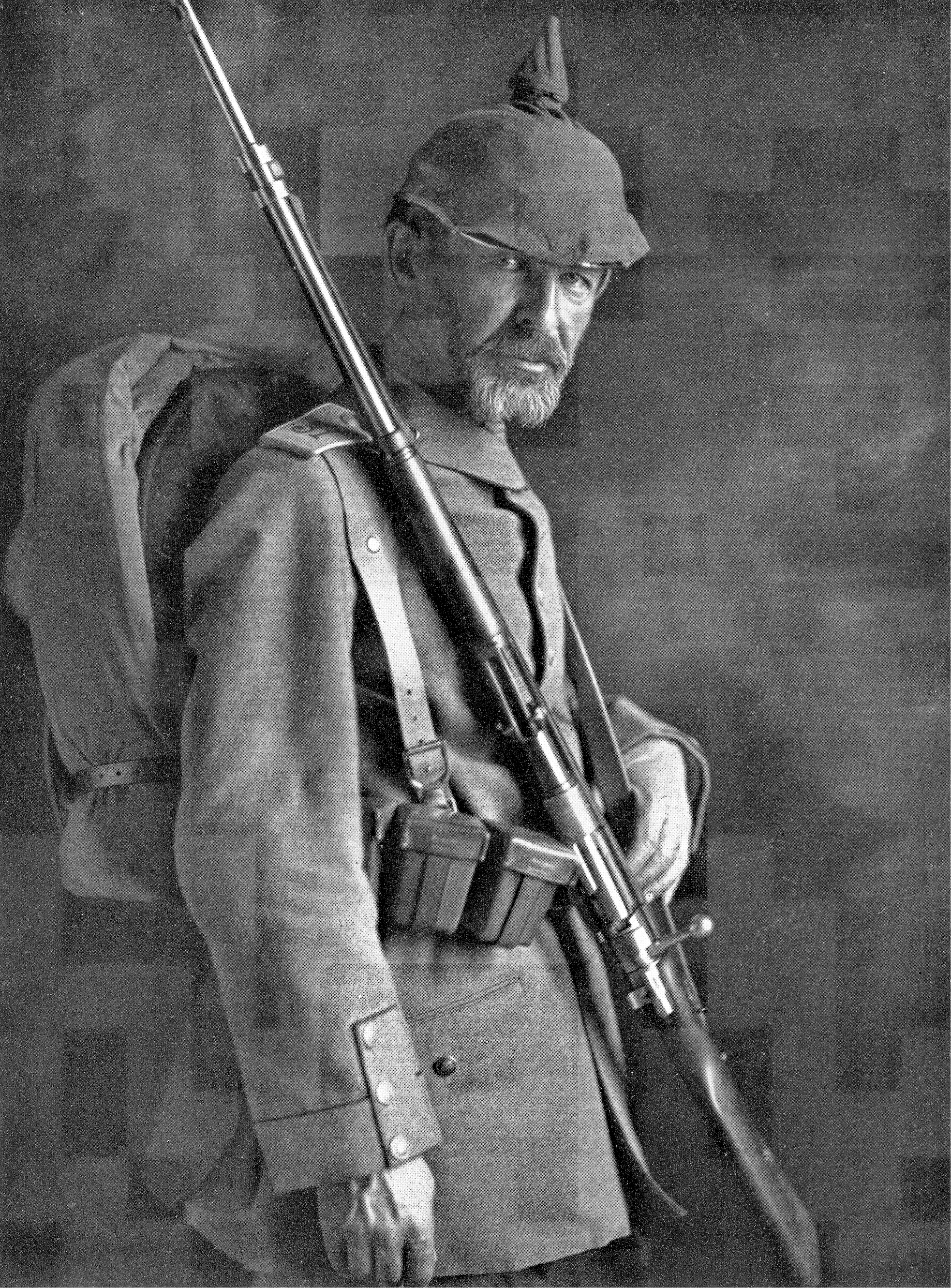
Minya Diez-Dührkoop (1916) Richard Dehmel as a soldier in World War 1

Dehmel was a champion of the rights of workers. However, despite his record of fighting conservatives, Dehmel joined the many patriotic and pro-war German intellectuals who inveighed the masses to support the German Empire after the outbreak of the First World War in 1914, signing the Manifesto of the Ninety-Three. Fifty-one at the time, Dehmel volunteered in 1914 and served until 1916, when he was wounded. He called on the Germans to keep fighting right until 1918. Dehmel died in 1920 in Blankenese from the after-effects of an injury sustained during the war.

== Literary work ==
Dehmel is considered one of the foremost German poets of the pre-World War I era. His poems are finished in form and use numerous metrical patterns. They were set to music by composers such as Richard Strauss (who met his principal librettist Hugo von Hofmannsthal at Dehmel's house), Max Reger, Alexander von Zemlinsky, Arnold Schoenberg, Luise Schulze-Berghof, Oskar Fried, Alma Mahler, Anton Webern, Ignatz Waghalter, Carl Orff, and Kurt Weill, or they inspired them to write music. Dehmel's main theme was "love and sex (Eros)", which he framed as a power to break away from middle-class values and fetters. In particular, his poem "Verklärte Nacht" (see that article for the poem) was set by Schoenberg in two versions and has been often performed.

== Works ==
- Erlösungen, poems 1891
- Aber die Liebe, poems 1893
- Weib und Welt, poems 1896
- Zwei Menschen. Roman in Romanzen, 1903
- Die Verwandlungen der Venus, poems 1907
- Michel Michael, comedy 1911
- Schöne wilde Welt, poems 1913
- Die Menschenfreunde, Drama 1917
- Mein Leben, autobiography 1922 (posthumously)
