= George Orwell bibliography =

Literary work of George Orwell

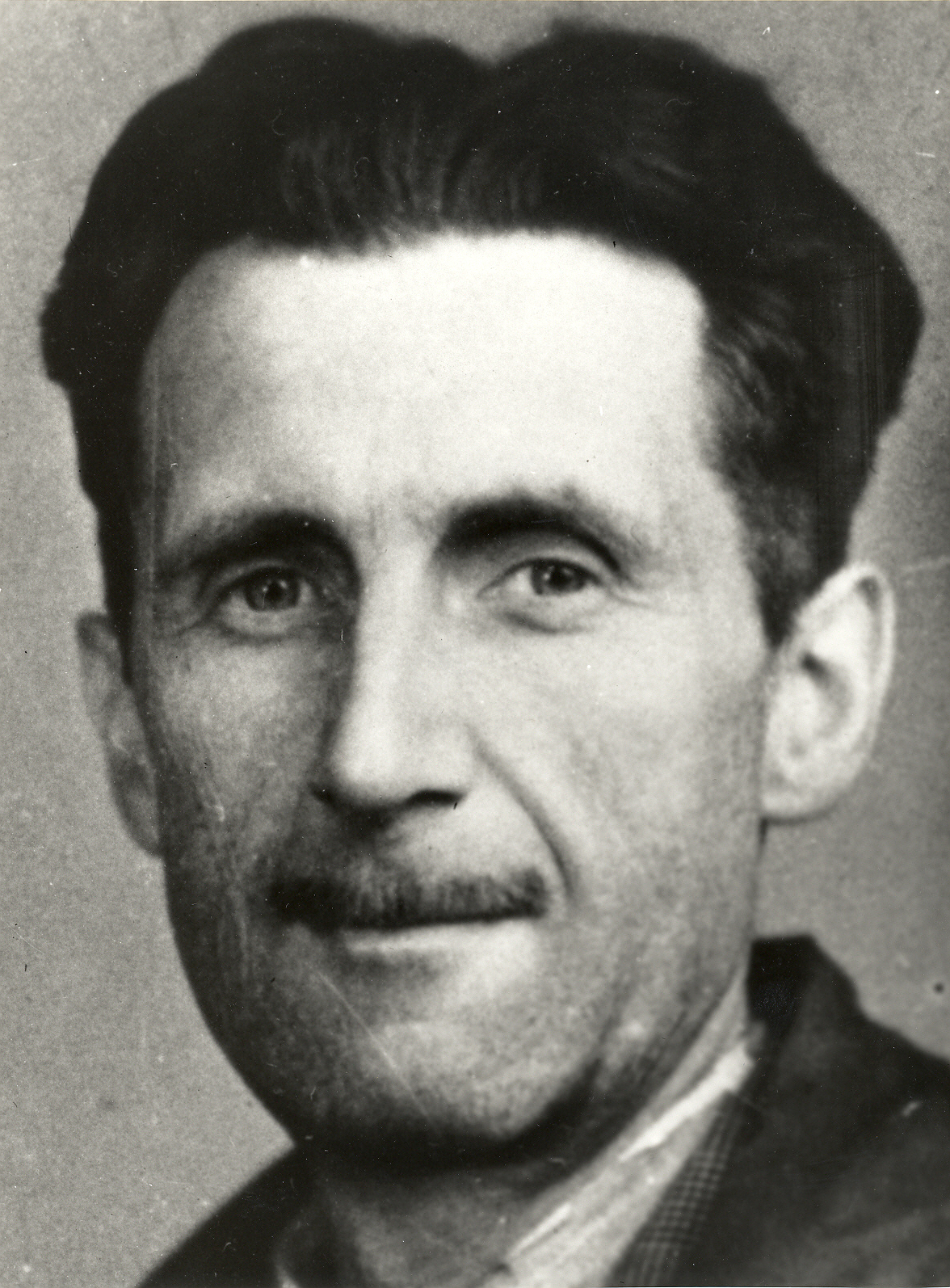
- Orwell pictured by the National Union of Journalists in 1943
- Books↙: 3
- Novels↙: 6
- Articles↙: 556
- Stories↙: 15
- Collections↙: 37
- Pamphlets↙: 7
- Poems↙: 18
- Plays↙: 1
- Scripts↙: 4
- Journals↙: 5
- Letters↙: 5
- Books edited↙: 2
- Periodicals edited↙: 1
- Newspapers edited↙: 2
- Complete works↙: 647

The bibliography of George Orwell includes journalism, essays, novels, and non-fiction books written by the British writer Eric Blair (1903–1950), either under his own name or, more usually, under his pen name George Orwell. Orwell was a prolific writer on topics related to contemporary English society and literary criticism, who has been declared "perhaps the 20th century's best chronicler of English culture." His non-fiction cultural and political criticism constitutes the majority of his work, but Orwell also wrote in several genres of fictional literature.

Orwell is best remembered for his political commentary as a left-wing anti-totalitarian. As he explained in the essay "Why I Write" (1946), "Every line of serious work that I have written since 1936 has been written, directly or indirectly, against totalitarianism and for democratic socialism, as I understand it." To that end, Orwell used his fiction as well as his journalism to defend his political convictions. He first achieved widespread acclaim with his novella Animal Farm and cemented his place in history with the publication of Nineteen Eighty-Four shortly before his death. While fiction accounts for a small fraction of his total output, these two novels are his best-selling works, having sold almost fifty million copies in sixty-two languages by 2007—more than any other pair of books by a twentieth-century author.

Orwell wrote non-fiction—including book reviews, editorials, and investigative journalism—for a variety of British periodicals. In his lifetime he published hundreds of articles including several regular columns in British newsweeklies related to literary and cultural criticism as well as his explicitly political writing. In addition he wrote book-length investigations of poverty in Britain in the form of Down and Out in Paris and London and The Road to Wigan Pier and one of the first retrospectives on the Spanish Civil War in Homage to Catalonia. Between 1941 and 1946 he also wrote fifteen "London Letters" for the American political and literary quarterly Partisan Review, the first of which appeared in the issue dated March–April 1941.

Only two compilations of Orwell's body of work were published in his lifetime, but since his death over a dozen collected editions have appeared. Two attempts have been made at comprehensive collections: The Collected Essays, Journalism and Letters in four volumes (1968, 1970), co-edited by Ian Angus and Orwell's widow Sonia Brownell; and The Complete Works of George Orwell, in 20 volumes, edited by Peter Davison, which began publication in the mid-1980s. The latter includes an addendum, The Lost Orwell (2007).

The impact of Orwell's large corpus is manifested in additions to the Western canon such as Nineteen Eighty-Four, its subjection to continued public notice and scholarly analyses, and the changes to vernacular English it has effected—notably the adoption of "Orwellian" as a description of totalitarian societies.

== Books: non-fiction and novels ==
Orwell wrote six novels: Burmese Days, A Clergyman's Daughter, Keep the Aspidistra Flying, Coming Up for Air, Animal Farm and Nineteen Eighty-Four. Most of these were semi-autobiographical. Burmese Days was inspired by his period working as an imperial policeman and is fictionalized; A Clergyman's Daughter follows a young woman who passes out from overwork and wakes up an amnesiac, forced to wander the countryside as she finds herself, eventually losing her belief in God, despite being the daughter of a clergyman. Keep the Aspidistra Flying and Coming Up for Air are examinations of the British class system. Animal Farm and Nineteen Eighty-Four are his most famous novels.

In addition to his novels Orwell also wrote three non-fiction books. Down and Out in Paris and London records his experiences tramping in those two cities. The Road to Wigan Pier is initially a study of poverty in the North of England, but ends with an extended autobiographical essay describing some of Orwell's experiences with poverty. Homage to Catalonia recounts his experiences as a volunteer fighting fascism with the Workers' Party of Marxist Unification in anarchist Catalonia during the Spanish Civil War.

=== Non-fiction ===
- Down and Out in Paris and London (9 January 1933, Victor Gollancz Ltd)
- The Road to Wigan Pier (February 1937, Left Book Club edition; 8 March 1937 Victor Gollancz Ltd edition for the general public)
- Homage to Catalonia (25 April 1938, Secker and Warburg)

=== Novels ===
- Burmese Days (25 October 1934, Harper & Brothers)
- A Clergyman's Daughter (11 March 1935, Victor Gollancz Ltd)
- Keep the Aspidistra Flying (20 April 1936, Victor Gollancz Ltd)
- Coming Up for Air (12 June 1939, Victor Gollancz Ltd)
- Animal Farm (17 August 1945, Secker and Warburg)
- Nineteen Eighty-Four (8 June 1949, Secker and Warburg)

== Articles ==
Orwell wrote hundreds of essays, book reviews and editorials. His insights into linguistics, literature and politics—in particular anti-fascism, anti-communism, and democratic socialism—continued to be influential decades after his death. Over a dozen of these were published in collections during his life—Inside the Whale and Other Essays by his original publisher Victor Gollancz Ltd in 1940, and Critical Essays by Secker and Warburg in 1946. The latter press also published the collections Shooting an Elephant and Other Essays in 1950 (republished by Penguin in 2003) and England Your England and Other Essays in 1953.

Since his death many collections of essays have appeared, with the first attempt at a comprehensive collection being the four-volume Collected Essays, Letters and Journalism of George Orwell edited by Ian Angus and Sonia Brownell, which was published by Secker and Warburg and Harcourt, Brace, Jovanovich in 1968–1970. Peter Davison of De Montfort University spent 17 years researching and correcting the entirety of Orwell's works with Angus and Sheila Davison, and devoted the last eleven volumes of the twenty-volume series The Complete Works of George Orwell to essays, letters, and journal entries. The entire series was initially printed by Secker and Warburg in 1986, finished by Random House in 1998, and revised between 2000 and 2002.

== Pamphlets ==
Starting with The Lion and the Unicorn (1941), several of Orwell's longer essays took the form of pamphlets:

- The Lion and the Unicorn: Socialism and the English Genius was printed by his publisher Secker and Warburg as Searchlight Books No. 1 on 19 February 1941.
- Betrayal of the Left was printed by his other regular publisher Victor Gollancz Ltd. in 1941, with material from Victor Gollancz, John Strachey, and others.
- Victory or Vested Interest? came from The Labour Book Service on 15 May 1942, with Orwell's "Culture and Democracy" (made up of the pieces "Fascism and Democracy" and "Patriots and Revolutionaries") amongst others.
- Talking to India, by E. M. Forster, Ritchie Calder, Cedric Dover, Hsiao Ch'ien and Others: A Selection of English Language Broadcasts to India was published in 1943 by Allen & Unwin, edited with an introduction by Orwell.
- James Burnham and the Managerial Revolution – Socialist Book Centre, printing of Second Thoughts on James Burnham under this title in July 1946.
- The English People was printed by William Collins 1947.
- British Pamphleteers Volume 1: From the 16th Century the 18th Century from Allan Wingate, spring 1948 was co-edited by Orwell and Reginald Reynolds with an introduction by Orwell.

== Poems ==
Orwell was not widely known for writing verse, but he did publish several poems that have survived, including many written during his school days:

- "Awake! Young Men of England" (1914)
- "Ballade" (1929)
- "A Dressed Man and a Naked Man" (1933)
- "A Happy Vicar I Might Have Been" (1935)
- "Ironic Poem About Prostitution" (written prior to 1936)
- "Kitchener" (1916)
- "The Lesser Evil" (1924)
- "A Little Poem" (1935)
- "On a Ruined Farm Near the His Master's Voice Gramophone Factory" (1934)
- "Our Minds Are Married, but We Are Too Young" (1918)
- "The Pagan" (1918)
- "The Wounded Cricketer" (1920)
- "Poem from Burma" (1922–1927)
- "Romance" (1925)
- "Sometimes in the Middle Autumn Days" (1933)
- "Suggested by a Toothpaste Advertisement" (1918–1919)
- "Summer-like for an Instant" (1933)
- "As One Non-Combatant to Another" (1943)

In October 2015 Finlay Publisher, for The Orwell Society, published George Orwell: The Complete Poetry, compiled and presented by Dione Venables.

== Editing ==
In addition to the pamphlets British Pamphleteers Volume 1: From the 16th Century the 18th Century and Talking to India, by E. M. Forster, Richie Calder, Cedric Dover, Hsiao Ch'ien and Others: A Selection of English Language Broadcasts to India, Orwell edited two newspapers during his Eton years—College Days/The Colleger (1917) and Election Times (1917–1921). While working for the BBC, he collected six editions of a poetry magazine named Voice which were broadcast by Orwell, Mulk Raj Anand, John Atkins, Edmund Blunden, Venu Chitale, William Empson, Vida Hope, Godfrey Kenton, Una Marson, Herbert Read, and Stephen Spender. The magazine was published and distributed to the readers before being broadcast by the BBC. Issue five has not been recovered and was consequently excluded from W. J. West's collection of BBC transcripts.

== Collected editions ==
Two essay collections were published during Orwell's lifetime—Inside the Whale and Other Essays in 1940 and Critical Essays in 1946 (the latter published in the United States as Dickens, Dali, and Others in 1958). His publisher followed up these anthologies with Shooting an Elephant and Other Essays in 1950, England Your England and Other Essays in 1953—which was revised as Such, Such Were the Joys—and Collected Essays in 1961. The first significant publications in the United States were Doubleday's A Collection of Essays by George Orwell from 1954, 1956's The Orwell Reader, Fiction, Essays, and Reportage from Harcourt Brace Jovanovich, and Penguin's Selected Essays in 1957; re-released in 1962 with the title Inside the Whale and Other Essays and in abridged form as Why I Write in 2005 as a part of the Great Ideas series. In the aforementioned series, Penguin also published the short collections Books v. Cigarettes (2008), Some Thoughts on the Common Toad (2010), and Decline of the English Murder (2009). The latter does not contain the same texts as Decline of the English Murder and Other Essays, published by Penguin in association with Secker & Warburg in 1965. The complete texts Orwell wrote for the Observer are collected in Orwell: The Observer Years published by Atlantic Books in 2003.

External videos
- After Words interview with George Packer, conducted by Christopher Hitchens, featuring discussion of Orwell's writings and Packer's work editing Facing Unpleasant Facts and All Art Is Propaganda, C-SPAN

In 1976 Martin Secker & Warburg Ltd in association with Octopus Books published The Complete Novels. This edition was later republished by Penguin Books in 1983, and reprinted in Penguin Classics 2000 and 2009. Since the publication of Davison's corrected critical edition, John Carey's thorough Essays was released on 15 October 2002, as a part of the Everyman's Library and George Packer edited two collections for Houghton Mifflin, released on 13 October 2008—All Art Is Propaganda: Critical Essays and Facing Unpleasant Facts: Narrative Essays.

Sonia Orwell and Ian Angus edited a four volume collection of Orwell's writings, The Collected Essays, Journalism and Letters of George Orwell, divided into four volumes:

- An Age Like This 1920–1940
- My Country Right or Left 1940–1943 (first published 1968)
- As I Please, 1943–1945
- In Front of Your Nose, 1945–1950

The Complete Works of George Orwell is a twenty-volume series, with the first nine being devoted to the non-fiction books and novels and the final eleven volumes entitled:

- A Kind of Compulsion: 1903–1936
- Facing Unpleasant Facts: 1937–1939
- A Patriot After All: 1940–1941
- All Propaganda Is Lies: 1941–1942
- Keeping Our Little Corner Clean: 1942–1943
- Two Wasted Years: 1943
- I Have Tried to Tell the Truth: 1943–1944
- I Belong to the Left: 1945
- Smothered Under Journalism: 1946
- It Is What I Think: 1947–1948
- Our Job Is to Make Life Worth Living: 1949–1950

In 2001 Penguin published four selections from The Complete Works of George Orwell edited by Peter Davison in their modern classics series titled Orwell and the Dispossessed: Down and Out in Paris and London in the Context of Essays, Reviews and Letters selected from The Complete Works of George Orwell with an introduction by Peter Clarke, Orwell's England: The Road to Wigan Pier in the Context of Essays, Reviews, Letters and Poems selected from The Complete Works of George Orwell with an introduction by Ben Pimlott, Orwell in Spain: The Full Text of Homage to Catalonia with Associated Articles, Reviews and Letters from The Complete Works of George Orwell with an introduction by Christopher Hitchens, and Orwell and Politics: Animal Farm in the Context of Essays, Reviews and Letters selected from The Complete Works of George Orwell with an introduction by Timothy Garton Ash.

Davison later compiled a handful of writings—including letters, an obituary for H. G. Wells, and his reconstruction of Orwell's list—into Lost Orwell: Being a Supplement to The Complete Works of George Orwell, which was published by Timewell Press in 2006, with a paperback published on 25 September 2007. In 2011, Davison's selection of letters and journal entries were published as George Orwell: A Life in Letters and Diaries by Harvill Secker. A selection by Davison from Orwell's journalism and other writings were published by Harvill Secker in 2014 under the title Seeing Things as They Are.

== Other works ==
After his first publication—the poem "Awake! Young Men of England", published in the Henley and South Oxfordshire Standard in 1914—Orwell continued to write for his school publications The Election Times and College Days/The Colleger. He also experimented with writing for several years before he could support himself as an author. These pieces include first-hand journalism (e.g. 1931's "The Spike"), articles (e.g. 1931's "Hop-Picking"), and even a one-act play—Free Will. (He would also adapt four plays as radio dramas.)

His production of fiction was not as prolific—while living in Paris he wrote a few unpublished stories and two novels, but burned the manuscripts. (Orwell routinely destroyed his manuscripts and with the exception of a partial copy of Nineteen Eighty-Four, all are lost. Davison would publish this as Nineteen Eighty-Four: The Facsimile of the Extant Manuscript by Houghton Mifflin Harcourt in May 1984, ISBN 978-0-15-166034-6.) In addition, Orwell produced several pieces while working at the BBC as a correspondent. Some were written by him and others were merely recited for radio broadcast. For years, these went uncollected until the anthologies Orwell: The War Broadcasts (Marboro Books, June 1985 and in the United States, as Orwell: The Lost Writings by Arbor House, September 1985) and Orwell: The War Commentaries (Gerald Duckworth & Company Ltd., London, 1 January 1985) were edited by W. J. West. Orwell was responsible for producing The Indian Section of BBC Eastern Service and his program notes from 1 February and 7 December 1942 have survived (they are reproduced in War Broadcasts). He was also asked to provide an essay about British cooking along with recipes for The British Council. Orwell kept a diary which has been published by his widow—Sonia Brownell—and academic Peter Davison, in addition to his private correspondence.

== Full list of publications ==
Legend for collected editions
All Art Is Propaganda: Critical Essays (AAIP)
Critical Essays (CrE)
Collected Essays (ColE)
The Collected Essays, Journalism and Letters of George Orwell (CEJL)
A Collection of Essays by George Orwell (CoE)
Complete Novels (CN)
The Complete Works of George Orwell (CW)
Decline of the English Murder and Other Essays (DotEM)
England Your England and Other Essays (EYE)
Essays (Everyman's Library) (EL)
Essays (Penguin Classics) (ELp)
Facing Unpleasant Facts: Narrative Essays (FUF)
Inside the Whale and Other Essays (ItW)
Lost Orwell: Being a Supplement to The Complete Works of George Orwell (LO)
On Jews and Antisemitism (JaA)
Orwell and Politics (OP)
Orwell and the Dispossessed (OD)
Orwell in Spain (OS)
Orwell: The Observer Years (OY)
Orwell: The War Broadcasts (WB)
Orwell: The War Commentaries (WC)
Orwell's England (OE)
The Orwell Reader, Fiction, Essays, and Reportage (OR)
Penguin Great Ideas

Books v. Cigarettes (BvC)
Decline of the English Murder (DEM)
Some Thoughts on the Common Toad (STCM)
Why I Write (WIW)

Ruins. Orwell’s Reports as War Correspondent in France, Germany and Austria from February until June 1945 (R)
Shooting an Elephant and Other Essays (SaE)
Selected Essays (SE)
Such, Such Were the Joys (SSWtJ)
Seeing Things As They Are (STATA)

Full list of Orwell works
Title (Note: Usually it is fairly certain that the titles of essays are Orwell's. Reviews, articles and letters to editors, however, were often given titles or headings by editors. Orwell mainly submitted his typescripts listing only the name of the author and title of the work being reviewed. Titles listed here are those found in George Orwell: A Bibliography by Fenwick, who gives them as originally printed, whereas Davison in The Complete Works seeks to cut out all titles that cannot with certainty be attributed to Orwell. For more information see the editorial note in The Complete Works, Vol. 10.)	Type	Date	Collected	Notes		
"£3.13s Worth of Pleasure"		3 January 1946	CW XVIII	Article published in the Manchester Evening News (3 January 1946) p. 2, recommending the following books which Orwell had read the previous year: Frost in May by Antonia White, After Puritanism, 1850–1900 by Hugh Kingsmill, The Future of Industrial Man by Peter Drucker, Memories of Lenin by Nadezhda Krupskaya, Liza of Lambeth by W. Somerset Maugham, The Savage Pilgrimage by Catherine Carswell, The Old School compiled by Graham Greene, English Messiahs by Ronald Matthews, Tales of Mean Streets and A Child of the Jago by Arthur Morrison, The Life of Cæsar by Guglielmo Ferrero, The Managerial Revolution by James Burnham, The Iron Heel by Jack London, The Diary of a Nobody by George and Weedon Grossmith, Some Tales of Mystery and Imagination by Edgar Allan Poe and the King Penguin Books on Edible Fungi, Poisonous Fungi, British Shells and Fishes of Britain’s Rivers and Lakes.		
"About It and About"		12 August 1939	CW XI	Review of Foreign Correspondent: Twelve British Journalists and In the Margins of History by L. B. Namier and Europe Going, Going, Gone! by Count Ferdinand von Czernin, published in Time and Tide		
"The Adventure of the Lost Meat-card"		3 June 1918	CW X	Short story published unsigned in The Election Times No. 4, pp. 43–46. (Note: The Election Times was produced by Eric Blair (Orwell) and other Eton scholars. Issues consisted of sets of handwritten pages and the precise makeup of each issue is therefore unclear. Blair was involved in the production of five issues, out of which only one, Number 4 (3 June 1918) have survived intact. Blair is listed as business manager, Denys King-Farlow as art manager, and R. A. B. Mynors as editor. Attributions of authorship is complicated because contributions were anonymous and the producers sometimes wrote out texts other than their own. Out of the contributions which can be attributed to Orwell with some certainty, Davison lists the three short stories, "The Adventure of the Lost Meat-card", "A Peep into the Future", and "The Slack-bob", as published in The Election Times No. 4. Fenwick additionally lists the dramatic sketch "Free Will", the poem "The Wounded Cricketer (Not Walt Whitman)", and two stanzas of the poem "The Youthful Mariner", as published in the issue. According to Davison the poems and the dramatic sketch listed by Fenwick, as well as the poem "The Photographer" and some or all of the poem "The Millionaires Pearl" may have formed part of the issue or may have been intended for another issue. All five of these uncertain additions, as well as "The Slack-bob", were, however, later reprinted in their original, or revised, form in College Days No. 5. For further discussion on attribution of the texts in The Election Times, see Davison, The Complete Works, Vol. 10, entry 29.)		
"After Twelve"		1 April 1920	CW X	Poem published unsigned in College Days No. 4, p. 104, possibly by Orwell (Note: For three entries ("After Twelve", "Ode to Field Days", and "A Summer Idyll") Fenwick erroneously gives the year of publication for issue number four of College Days as 1919 instead of 1920.) (Note: For further discussion on attribution of the texts in College Days, see Davison, The Complete Works, Vol. 10, entry 37)		
All Art Is Propaganda: Critical Essays		13 October 2008	—	Published by Houghton Mifflin Harcourt in New York City, edited by George Packer. Companion volume to Facing Unpleasant Facts: Narrative Essays		
"All Change Is Here"		7 May 1944	OY	Published in The Observer		
"Allies Facing Food Crisis in Germany"		15 April 1945	OY, R	War report published in The Observer		
"An American Critic"		10 May 1942	OY	Published in The Observer		
Animal Farm		17 August 1945	CN, CW VIII, OP	Published by Secker and Warburg in London on and Harcourt Brace Jovanovich in New York City on 26 August 1946. The original printing is entitled Animal Farm: A Fairy Story.		
"Anti-Semitism in Britain"		April 1945	SSWtJ, EYE, ColE, CEJL III, EL, ELp, JaA	Published in Contemporary Jewish Record		
"Are Books Too Dear?"		1 June 1944	EL	Published in Manchester Evening News		
"A.R.D – After rooms – JANNEY"		1 April 1920	CW X	Mock advertisement published unsigned in College Days No. 4, p. 103. Written together with Denys King-Farlow.		
"The Art of Donald McGill"		September 1941	AAIP, CEJL II, CoE, ColE, CrE, DotEM, EL, ELp, OD	Published in Horizon		
"Arthur Koestler"		11 September 1944	CrE, ColE, CEJL III, EL, ELp	Unpublished typescript		
"As I Please" #1	Article	3 December 1943	CEJL III, EL, FUF	Published in Tribune		
"As I Please" #2	Article	10 December 1943	EL, FUF	Published in Tribune		
"As I Please" #3	Article	17 December 1943	CEJL III, EL, FUF	Published in Tribune		
"As I Please" #4	Article	24 December 1943	CEJL III, EL	Published in Tribune		
"As I Please" #5	Article	31 December 1943	CEJL III, EL	Published in Tribune		
"As I Please" #6	Article	7 January 1944	CEJL III, EL	Published in Tribune		
"As I Please" #7	Article	14 January 1944	CEJL III, EL	Published in Tribune		
"As I Please" #8	Article	21 January 1944	CEJL III, EL	Published in Tribune		
"As I Please" #9	Article	28 January 1944	CEJL III, EL	Published in Tribune		
"As I Please" #10	Article	4 February 1944	CEJL III, EL	Published in Tribune		
"As I Please" #11	Article	11 February 1944	CEJL III, EL	Published in Tribune		
"As I Please" #12	Article	18 February 1944	EL	Published in Tribune		
"As I Please" #13	Article	25 February 1944	CEJL III, EL	Published in Tribune		
"As I Please" #14	Article	3 March 1944	CEJL III, EL	Published in Tribune		
"As I Please" #15	Article	10 March 1944	CEJL III, EL	Published in Tribune		
"As I Please" #16	Article	17 March 1944	CEJL III, EL, FUF	Published in Tribune		
"As I Please" #17	Article	24 March 1944	CEJL III, EL	Published in Tribune		
"As I Please" #18	Article	31 March 1944	CEJL III, EL	Published in Tribune		
"As I Please" #19	Article	7 April 1944	EL	Published in Tribune		
"As I Please" #20	Article	14 April 1944	CEJL III, EL	Published in Tribune		
"As I Please" #21	Article	21 April 1944	CEJL III, EL	Published in Tribune		
"As I Please" #22	Article	28 April 1944	CEJL III, EL	Published in Tribune		
"As I Please" #23	Article	5 May 1944	CEJL III, EL	Published in Tribune		
"As I Please" #24	Article	12 May 1944	CEJL III, EL	Published in Tribune		
"As I Please" #25	Article	19 May 1944	CEJL III, EL	Published in Tribune		
"As I Please" #26	Article	26 May 1944	CEJL III, EL	Published in Tribune		
"As I Please" #27	Article	2 June 1944	CEJL III, EL	Published in Tribune		
"As I Please" #28	Article	9 June 1944	CEJL III, EL	Published in Tribune		
"As I Please" #29	Article	16 June 1944	CEJL III, EL	Published in Tribune		
"As I Please" #30	Article	23 June 1944	CEJL III, EL	Published in Tribune		
"As I Please" #31	Article	30 June 1944	CEJL III, EL	Published in Tribune		
"As I Please" #32	Article	7 July 1944	CEJL III, EL	Published in Tribune		
"As I Please" #33	Article	14 July 1944	CEJL III, EL	Published in Tribune		
"As I Please" #34	Article	21 July 1944	CEJL III, EL	Published in Tribune		
"As I Please" #35	Article	28 July 1944	CEJL III, EL, OD (excerpt)	Published in Tribune		
"As I Please" #36	Article	4 August 1944	CEJL III, EL	Published in Tribune		
"As I Please" #37	Article	11 August 1944	CEJL III, EL, OE (excerpt)	Published in Tribune		
"As I Please" #38	Article	18 August 1944	CEJL III, EL	Published in Tribune		
"As I Please" #39	Article	25 August 1944	CEJL III, EL	Published in Tribune		
"As I Please" #40	Article	1 September 1944	CEJL III, EL	Published in Tribune		
"As I Please" #41	Article	8 September 1944	CEJL III, EL	Published in Tribune		
"As I Please" #42	Article	15 September 1944	CEJL III, EL, OS (excerpt)	Published in Tribune		
"As I Please" #43	Article	6 October 1944	CEJL III, EL	Published in Tribune		
"As I Please" #44	Article	13 October 1944	CEJL III, EL	Published in Tribune		
"As I Please" #45	Article	20 October 1944	CEJL III, EL	Published in Tribune		
"As I Please" #46	Article	27 October 1944	CEJL III, EL	Published in Tribune		
"As I Please" #47	Article	3 November 1944	CEJL III, EL	Published in Tribune		
"As I Please" #48	Article	17 November 1944	CEJL III, EL	Published in Tribune		
"As I Please" #49	Article	24 November 1944	CEJL III, EL	Published in Tribune		
"As I Please" #50	Article	1 December 1944	CEJL III, EL	Published in Tribune		
"As I Please" #51	Article	8 December 1944	CEJL III, EL	Published in Tribune		
"As I Please" #52	Article	29 December 1944	CEJL III, EL	Published in Tribune		
"As I Please" #53	Article	5 January 1945	CEJL III, EL	Published in Tribune		
"As I Please" #54	Article	12 January 1945	CEJL III, EL	Published in Tribune		
"As I Please" #55	Article	19 January 1945	CEJL III, EL	Published in Tribune		
"As I Please" #56	Article	26 January 1945	CEJL III, EL	Published in Tribune		
"As I Please" #57	Article	2 February 1945	CEJL III, EL	Published in Tribune		
"As I Please" #58	Article	9 February 1945	CEJL III, EL	Published in Tribune		
"As I Please" #59	Article	16 February 1945	CEJL III, EL	Published in Tribune		
"As I Please" #60	Article	8 November 1946	CEJL IV, EL	Published in Tribune		
"As I Please" #61	Article	15 November 1946	CEJL IV, EL	Published in Tribune		
"As I Please" #62	Article	22 November 1946	CEJL IV, EL	Published in Tribune		
"As I Please" #63	Article	29 November 1946	CEJL IV, EL	Published in Tribune		
"As I Please" #64	Article	6 December 1946	CEJL IV, EL	Published in Tribune		
"As I Please" #65	Article	13 December 1946	CEJL IV, EL	Published in Tribune		
"As I Please" #66	Article	20 December 1946	CEJL IV, EL	Published in Tribune		
"As I Please" #67	Article	27 December 1946	CEJL IV, EL	Published in Tribune		
"As I Please" #68	Article	3 January 1947	CEJL IV, EL	Published in Tribune		
"As I Please" #69	Article	17 January 1947	CEJL IV, EL	Published in Tribune		
"As I Please" #70	Article	24 January 1947	CEJL IV, EL	Published in Tribune		
"As I Please" #71	Article	31 January 1947	CEJL IV, EL	Published in Tribune		
"As I Please" #72	Article	7 February 1947	CEJL IV, EL	Published in Tribune		
"As I Please" #73	Article	14 February 1947	CEJL IV, EL	Published in Tribune		
"As I Please" #74	Article	21 February 1947	EL	Published in Manchester Evening News for Tribune		
"As I Please" #75A	Article	27 February 1947	EL	Published in Daily Herald for Tribune		
"As I Please" #75B	Article	28 February 1947	EL	Published in Manchester Evening News for Tribune		
"As I Please" #76	Article	7 March 1947	CEJL IV, EL	Published in Tribune		
"As I Please" #77	Article	14 March 1947	CEJL IV, EL, OE (excerpt)	Published in Tribune		
"As I Please" #78	Article	21 March 1947	EL	Published in Tribune		
"As I Please" #79	Article	28 March 1947	CEJL IV, EL	Published in Tribune		
"As I Please" #80	Article	4 April 1947	EL	Published in Tribune		
"As I Was Saying"	Review	10 February 1946	CEJL IV, CW XVIII, OY	Review of The Democrat at the Supper Table by Colm Brogan. Published in The Observer No. 8072 (10 February 1946) p. 3.		
"As One Non-Combatant to Another"	Poem	18 June 1943	CEJL II	Poem written in response to Alex Comfort's Letter to an American Visitor (published under the pseudonym "Obadiah Hornbrooke" in Tribune 9 June 1943), published in Tribune		
"At School and on Holiday"		7 December 1940	—	Published in Time and Tide		
"Authentic Socialism"	Review	16 June 1938	CEJL I, CW XI	Review of The Freedom of the Streets by Jack Common, published in the New English Weekly Vol. XIII, No. 10 (16 June 1938) p. 192.		
unpublished response to Authors Take Sides on the Spanish War		3 August 1937	CW XI, EL, OS	Unpublished response, written sometime between 3 and 6 August 1937, to a questionnaire sent out by Nancy Cunard and the Left Review for the pamphlet Authors Take Sides on the Spanish War.		
"Autobiographical Note"		17 April 1940	CEJL II	Written for Stanley Kunitz and Howard Haycraft's Twentieth Century Authors, published by W. H. Wilson & Co. in 1942		
"Awake! Young Men of England"	Poem	2 October 1914	CW X	Poem published in the Henley and South Oxfordshire Standard Vol. XXV, No. 1455, p. 8, signed "Eric Blair"		
"Back to the Land"		3 September 1944	OY	Published in The Observer		
"Back to the Twenties"	Review	21 October 1937	CW XI	Review of the September 1937 issue of the magazine The Booster published in the New English Weekly Vol. XII, No. 2 (21 October 1937) pp. 30–31.		
"Background of French Morocco"		20 November 1942	—	Published in Tribune		
"Background to Travel"		25 September 1937	CEJL I, CW XI	Review of Journey to Turkistan by Eric Teichman, published in Time and Tide Vol. XVIII, No. 39 (25 September 1937) p. 1269		
"'Bad' Climates Are Best"		2 February 1946	CW XVIII, EL	Essay published in Evening Standard (2 February 1946) p. 6. Abridged version published as "I Don't Mind What the Weatherman Says" in SEAC: The All-Services Newspaper of South East Asia Command (23 February 1946) p. 2.		
"Ballade"		June 1929	—	Written before the summer of 1929, this poem has not survived		
"Banish This Uniform"		22 December 1945	EL	Published in Evening Standard		
"Bare Christmas for the Children"		1 December 1945	EL	Published in Evening Standard		
Bastard Death by Michael Fraenkel and Fast One by Paul Cain	Review	23 April 1936	CEJL I	Book review published in New English Weekly		
"Battle Ground"		16 December 1945	OY	Published in The Observer		
"Bavarian Peasants Ignore the War"	Report	22 April 1945	OY, R	War report published in The Observer		
"The Bayonet in War"		21 March 1941	—	Published in The Spectator		
BBC Internal Memorandum		15 October 1942	CEJL II	Memo written by Orwell for his boss at BBC Eastern Service outlining his demands for working on-air		
"Beggars in London"		12 January 1929	—	Published in French in Progrès Civique		
"Behind the Ranges"		11 June 1944	OY	Published in The Observer		
"Benefit of Clergy: Some Notes on Salvador Dali"		1944	CrE, ColE, DotEM, CEJL III, EL, ELp, AAIP, STCM	Book review of Salvador Dalí's Life intended for The Saturday Book volume four.		
"Bernard Shaw"	Broadcast	22 January 1943	WB	Broadcast by the BBC		
"The Best Novels of 1949: Some Personal Choices"		1 January 1950	LO, OY	A list of authors' favourite books of 1949 published in The Observer		
Black Spring by Henry Miller, A Passage to India by E. M. Forster, Death of a Hero by Richard Aldington, The Jungle by Upton Sinclair, A Hind Let Loose by Charles Edward Montague, and A Safety Match by Ian Hay		24 September 1936	CEJL I	Book review published in New English Weekly		
"The Book Racket"		September 1939	CW XI	Review of Best-Sellers by George Stevens, Stanley Unwin and Frank Swinnerton, published in The Adelphi		
"Books and the People: Money and Virtue"		10 November 1944	CEJL III, CW XVI	Review of The Vicar of Wakefield by Oliver Goldsmith, published in Tribune No. 410, pp. 15–16		
"Books v. Cigarettes"		8 February 1946	BvC, CEJL IV, CW XVII, EL, ELp, SaE	Essay published in Tribune No. 476 (8 February 1946) p. 15. Abridged version published as "You Too Can Own a Library" in English Digest Vol. 21, No. 3 (May 1946) pp. 83–85.		
"Bookshop Memories"		November 1936	CEJL I, EL, ELp, FUF	Published in Fortnightly Review		
"Booster"		11 November 1937	CW XI	Letter to the editor in reply to a letter from The Booster (4 November 1937), published in the New English Weekly Vol. XII, No. 5 (11 November 1937) p. 100.		
"Boys' Weeklies"		11 March 1940	AAIP, CEJL I, CoE, CrE, ColE, ItW, OD, SE, ELp	Published in Horizon in abridged form and revised for Inside the Whale and Other Essays		
"Britain's Struggle for Survival: The Labour Government After Three Years"		October 1948	—	Published in Commentary		
"British Cookery"	Article	1946	—	Article with recipes commissioned by the British Council; due to rationing, it was not published		
"The British Crisis"		8 May 1942	OP	Published in Partisan Review, June/July 1942.		
"The British General Election"		November 1945	—	Published in Commentary		
"Britain's Left-Wing Press"		June 1948	EL	Published in The Progressive		
British Pamphleteers Volume 1: From the 16th Century the 18th Century		April 1948	—	Published by Allan Wingate in Spring 1948, co-edited by Orwell and Reginald Reynolds with an introduction by Orwell.		
"British Rations and the Submarine War"	Broadcast	22 January 1942	WB	Broadcast by the BBC		
The British Way in Warfare by Basil Liddell Hart		21 November 1942	CEJL II	Book review published in New Statesman and Nation		
"Burma"		22 April 1943	—	Published in Tribune		
"Burma Roads"		1 October 1944	OY	Published in The Observer		
Burmese Days		25 October 1934	CN, CW II, OR (excerpts)	Published by HarperCollins in New York City on 25 October 1934 and by Victor Gollancz, Ltd. in London on 24 June 1935. This is the only Orwell book to be initially published outside of the United Kingdom.		
"Burmese Days"		24 February 1946	CEJL IV (excerpt), CW XVIII, OY	Review of The Story of Burma by F. Tennyson Jesse, Burma Pamphlets No. 7: The Burman: An Appreciation by C. J. Richards and Burma Pamphlets No 8: The Karens of Burma by Harry Ignatius Marshall. Published in The Observer No. 8074 (24 February 1946) p. 3.		
Burmese Interlude by C. V. Warren		12 January 1938	CW XI	Review of Burmese Interlude by C. V. Warren published unsigned in The Listener (12 January 1938) p. 101. (Note: The ten unsigned reviews in The Listener are attributed by Davison to Orwell from the journal's records.)		
"Burnham's View of the Contemporary World Struggle"		29 March 1947	CEJL IV, EL	Published in The New Leader		
Burnt Norton, The Dry Salvages, and East Coker by T. S. Eliot		October 1942	CEJL II, EL, AAIP	Poetry reviews published in Poetry London, October/November 1942		
"But Are We Really Ruder? No"		26 January 1946	CW XVIII, EL	Published as a Saturday Essay in Evening Standard (26 January 1946) p. 6. Reprinted as "Are We Really Ruder? No" in SEAC: The All-Services Newspaper of South East Asia Command (13 April 1946) p. 2.		
"By-Words"		16 November 1940	—	Published in New Statesman and Nation		
Byron and the Need of Fatality by Charles du Bos, translated from the French by Ethel Colburn Mayne	Review	September 1932	CEJL I	Book review published in Adelphi, signed "Eric Blair"		
"Caesarean Section in Spain"		March 1939	CW XI, OS	Article published in The Highway: A Review of Adult Education and the Journal of the Workers' Educational Association Vol. 31, pp. 145–147		
The Calf of Paper by Sholem Asch and Midnight by Julien Green	Review	12 November 1936	CEJL I	Book review published in New English Weekly		
Caliban Shrieks by Jack Hilton	Review	May 1935	CEJL I, EL, OD	Book review published in The Adelphi, first writing credited to "George Orwell"		
"Can Socialists Be Happy?"		24 December 1943	EL, AAIP	Published in Tribune under the authorship of "John Freeman" (possibly in reference to British politician of the same name) and later attributed to Orwell by Davison. (Note: Orwell's authorship of this article is disputed. In a review published in Times Higher Education, Scott Bradfield writes: There are also times when Davison seems in too big a hurry to add a hitherto neglected item to the canon, such as his inclusion of an essay titled: "Can socialists be happy?" which was originally published under the name John Freeman. "Freeman" is the sort of nom de plume Orwell might have relished, and the essay does refer to many of Orwell's favourite subjects. But it is also just about the worst piece of writing in this entire edition, studded with the sort of wooden, thesis-driven paragraphs you might expect from a class in freshman composition. As Davison provides no compelling evidence that this essay must have been written by Orwell, the world could probably live without it. While Peter Davison—the editor of the Complete Works—writes: George Orwell's payment book for 20 December 1943, records the sum of pounds 5.50 for a special article of 2,000 words for Tribune [...]. The name Freeman would have appealed to Orwell as a pseudonym, and the article has many social, political and literary links with Orwell [...]. The reason why Orwell chose to write as 'John Freeman' [...] is not clear. It may be that Tribune did not want its literary editor to be seen to be associated with its political pages. Possibly it was a device that allowed Orwell to be paid a special fee. Or it may be that he simply wished to see how far Tribune would let him go with his opinions.)		
"The Case for the Open Fire"		8 December 1945	EL, FUF	Published in Evening Standard		
"Carlyle"	Review	March 1931	CEJL I	Review of The Two Carlyles by Osbert Burdett, published in The Adelphi, signed "Eric Blair"		
"Catastrophic Gradualism"		November 1943	CEJL IV, EL	Published in Common Wealth Review		
"A Catholic Confronts Communism"	Review	27 January 1939	CEJL I, CW XI, EL, OP	Review of Communism and Man by F. J. Sheed published in Peace News		
"Censorship in England"		6 October 1928	—	Published in French as "La censure en angleterre" in Monde		
"Charles Dickens"		11 March 1940	ItW, CrE, CoE, ColE, DotEM, CEJL I, EL, ELp, AAIP	First published in Inside the Whale and Other Essays		
"Charles the Great"		2 September 1945	OY	Published in The Observer		
"Childhood in the South"	Review	28 February 1946	CW XVIII	Review of Black Boy by Richard Wright, Of Many Men by James Aldridge and The Cross and the Arrow by Albert Maltz. Published in Manchester Evening News (28 February 1946) p. 2.		
"The Children Who Cannot Be Billeted"		13 August 1944	OY	Published in The Observer		
"Chinese Miracles"		6 August 1944	OY	Published in The Observer		
"Chosen People"		30 January 1944	OY, JaA	Published in The Observer		
"Classics Reviewed: The Martyrdom of Man"		15 March 1946	CEJL IV, EL	Book review of the book by William Winwood Reade published in Tribune		
A Clergyman's Daughter		11 March 1935	CN, CW III, OR (excerpts)	Published by Victor Gollancz, Ltd in London on 11 March 1935 and in New York City on 17 August 1936.		
"Clerical Party May Re-emerge in France: Educational Controversy"	Report	11 March 1945	OY, R	War report published in The Observer		
"Clink"		August 1932	CEJL I, EL, FUF, OD	Unpublished		
A Coat of Many Colours: Occasional Essays by Herbert Reade by Herbert Taylor Reade		December 1945	CEJL IV	Published in Poetry Quarterly, Winter 1945		
Collected Essays		1961	—	Published by Secker and Warburg in London		
The Collected Essays, Journalism and Letters of George Orwell – Volume 1: An Age Like This 1920–1940		1968	—	Published by Harcourt, Brace & World in New York City, later republished by Mariner Books in 1971, David R Godine in 2000, and Penguin UK in 2003		
The Collected Essays, Journalism and Letters of George Orwell – Volume 2: My Country Right or Left 1940–1943		1968	—	Published by Harcourt, Brace & World in New York City, later republished by Mariner Books in 1971, David R Godine in 2000, and Penguin UK in 2003		
The Collected Essays, Journalism and Letters of George Orwell – Volume 3: As I Please, 1943–1945		1968	—	Published by Harcourt, Brace & World in New York City, later republished by Mariner Books in 1971, David R Godine in 2000, and Penguin UK in 2003		
The Collected Essays, Journalism and Letters of George Orwell – Volume 4: In Front of Your Nose, 1945–1950		1968	—	Published by Harcourt, Brace & World in New York City, later republished by Mariner Books in 1971, David R Godine in 2000, and Penguin UK in 2003		
Collected Poems of W. H. Davies by W. H. Davies	Review	19 December 1943	CEJL III, EL, OY	Book review published in The Observer		
A Collection of Essays by George Orwell		1954	—	Published by Doubleday and Company in Garden City in 1954		
Coming Up for Air		12 June 1939	CN, CW VI, OR (excerpts)	Published by Victor Gollancz, Ltd in London on 12 June 1939		
"Common Lodging Houses"		3 September 1932	CEJL I, EL, OD, STATA	Published in The New Statesman and Nation, signed "Eric Blair"		
The Complete Works of George Orwell – Volume 10: A Kind of Compulsion: 1903–1936	Book	1986	—	Published by Secker and Warburg in 1986, later reprinted in 1999; volumes one to nine are reprintings of Orwell's non-fiction books and novels		
The Complete Works of George Orwell – Volume 11: Facing Unpleasant Facts: 1937–1939	Book	1986	–	Published by Secker and Warburg in 1986, later reprinted in 1999; volumes one to nine are reprintings of Orwell's non-fiction books and novels		
The Complete Works of George Orwell – Volume 12: A Patriot After All: 1940–1941	Book	1986	—	Published by Secker and Warburg in 1986, later reprinted in 1999; volumes one to nine are reprintings of Orwell's non-fiction books and novels		
The Complete Works of George Orwell – Volume 13: All Propaganda Is Lies: 1941–1942	Book	1986	—	Published by Secker and Warburg in 1986, later reprinted in 1999; volumes one to nine are reprintings of Orwell's non-fiction books and novels		
The Complete Works of George Orwell – Volume 14: Keeping Our Little Corner Clean: 1942–1943	Book	1986	—	Published by Secker and Warburg in 1986, later reprinted in 1999; volumes one to nine are reprintings of Orwell's non-fiction books and novels		
The Complete Works of George Orwell – Volume 15: Two Wasted Years: 1943	Book	1986	—	Published by Secker and Warburg in 1986, later reprinted in 1999; volumes one to nine are reprintings of Orwell's non-fiction books and novels		
The Complete Works of George Orwell – Volume 16: I Have Tried to Tell the Truth: 1943–1944	Book	1986	—	Published by Secker and Warburg in 1986, later reprinted in 1999; volumes one to nine are reprintings of Orwell's non-fiction books and novels		
The Complete Works of George Orwell – Volume 17: I Belong to the Left: 1945	Book	1986	—	Published by Secker and Warburg in 1986, later reprinted in 1999; volumes one to nine are reprintings of Orwell's non-fiction books and novels		
The Complete Works of George Orwell – Volume 18: Smothered Under Journalism: 1946	Book	1986	—	Published by Secker and Warburg in 1986, later reprinted in 1999; volumes one to nine are reprintings of Orwell's non-fiction books and novels		
The Complete Works of George Orwell – Volume 19: It Is What I Think: 1947–1948	Book	1986	—	Published by Secker and Warburg in 1986, later reprinted in 1999; volumes one to nine are reprintings of Orwell's non-fiction books and novels		
The Complete Works of George Orwell – Volume 20: Our Job Is to Make Life Worth Living: 1949–1950	Book	1986	—	Published by Secker and Warburg in 1986, later reprinted in 1999; volumes one to nine are reprintings of Orwell's non-fiction books and novels		
"Concerning the Quartier Montparnasse"		June 1929	—	A series of articles published in French as "Ayant toujours trait au Quartier Montparnasse", which were written before the summer of 1929 and have not survived		
"Confessions of a Book Reviewer"		3 May 1946	SaE, CEJL IV, EL, ELp, AAIP	Published in Tribune		
"Conrad's Place and Rank in English Letters"		10 April 1949	CEJL IV	Published in Wiadomosci		
"A Controversy: Agate: Orwell"		21 December 1944	CEJL III	Orwell's review of Noblesse Oblige—Another Letter to My Son by Osbert Sitwell was published in Manchester Evening News on 30 November 1944, with James Agate's response to Orwell published on 21 December 1944 and this response by Orwell appearing in the same issue.		
"The Cost of Letters"		September 1946	CEJL IV, EL	Published in Horizon, also entitled "Questionnaire: The Cost of Letters"		
"The Cost of Radio Programmes"		1 February 1946	CW XVIII	Article published in Tribune No. 475 (1 February 1946) p. 8.		
"Countryman's World"	Review	23 March 1944	CW XVI, EL	Review of The Way of a Countryman by William Beach Thomas, published in The Manchester Evening News No. 23,354, p. 2		
Crainquebille by Anatole France		11 August 1943	WB	Adaptation of France's play as a radio drama by Orwell, broadcast by the BBC		
"Creating Order out of Cologne Chaos"		25 March 1945	OY, R	War report published in The Observer		
Cricket Country by Edmund Blunden	Review	20 April 1944	CEJL III, EL	Book review published in Manchester Evening News		
"The Cricket Enthusiast"		9 July 1920	CW X	Short story published unsigned in College Days No. 5, p. 150		
Critical Essays		14 February 1946	—	Published by Secker and Warburg in London and as Dickens, Dali and Others: Studies in Popular Culture by Reynal and Hitchcock in April 1946.		
"Culture and Democracy"		15 May 1942	—	Published in Victory or Vested Interest?, made up of "Fascism and Democracy" and "Patriots and Revolutionaries"		
"Culture and the Classes"		28 November 1948	CEJL IV, EL, OY	Book review of Notes Towards the Definition of Culture by T. S. Eliot published in The Observer		
"Books in General"		17 August 1940	CEJL II	Article on Charles Reade, published in New Statesman and Nation		
"Cycle of Cathay"		11 November 1945	OY	Published in The Observer		
"Danger of Separate Occupation Zones"		20 May 1945	OY, R	War report published in The Observer		
"In the Darlan Country"		29 November 1942	OY	Published in The Observer		
"A Day in the Life of a Tramp"		5 January 1929	OE	Published in French in Progrès Civique		
"De Gaulle Intends to Keep Indo-China"		18 March 1945	OY, R	War report published in The Observer		
"Dear Doktor Goebbels – Your British Friends Are Feeding Fine!"		23 July 1941	EL, FUF	Published in Daily Express		
"Decline of the English Murder"		15 February 1946	CEJL IV, CW XVIII, DEM, DotEM, EL, ELp, OE, OR, SaE	Published in Tribune No. 477 (15 February 1946) pp. 10–11.		
Decline of the English Murder and Other Essays		1965	—	Published by Penguin Group in London		
"The Defence of Freedom"		11 October 1948	OY	Published in The Observer		
"Democracy in the British Army"		September 1939	CEJL I, CW XI, EL, OD	Article published in The Left Forum		
"Democrats and Dictators"		17 February 1940	—	Published in Time and Tide		
"Dear Friend: Allow Me for a Little While"	Poem	c. 1922–1927	CW X	Poem, handwritten manuscript, 1f (Note: It is not possible to precisely date the material Orwell drafted during his time with the Imperial Police in Burma from 1922 to 1927.)		
Der Führer by Conred Heiden		4 January 1945	EL	Book review published in Manchester Evening News		
"Desert and Islands"		21 November 1936	—	Published in Time and Tide		
The Development of William Butler Yeats by V. K. Narayana Menon	Review	January 1943	EL, ELp, CrE, ColE, CELJ II	Book review published in Horizon		
Ruins: Orwell's Reports as War Correspondent in France, Germany and Austria from February until June 1945		24 August 2021	—	Edited by Paul Seeliger and Stephen Kearney, published in Berlin by Comino Verlag		
On Jews and Antisemitism		28 November 2022	—	Edited and annotated by Paul Seeliger, published by Comino Verlag		
Diaries		2009	—	Edited by Peter Davison, 1. published in London by Harvill Secker (2009), 1. American Edition (with introduction by Christopher Hitchens) in New York by Liveright Publ. Corp. (2012)		
"’Displaced’ Are Allied Problem"		28 March 1945	R	War report published in Manchester Evening News		
"Do Our Colonies Pay?"		8 March 1946	—	Published in Tribune		
Down and Out in Paris and London		9 January 1933	CW I, OD, OR (excerpts)	Published by Victor Gollancz, Ltd in London on 9 January 1933 and in the United States on 30 June 1933.		
"Presenting the Future"		10 June 1937	CW XI	Reprint of a short section of chapter two of The Road to Wigan Pier in The News Chronicle, (10 June 1937) p. 6. Part four in a five-day series presenting the work of "young writers already famous among critics, less well-known among the public."		
"Down Under"		14 March 1948	OY	Published in The Observer		
"A Dressed Man and a Naked Man"		October 1933	CEJL I, OD	Poem published in The Adelphi, signed "Eric Blair"		
Editorial		May 1946	CEJL IV	Published in Polemic number three		
"Edmund Blunden"		8 January 1943	WB	An introduction to a talk by Blunden broadcast over the BBC		
"The Edwardian Revolution"		17 January 1946	CW XVIII	Review of The Condition of the British People, 1911–1945 by Mark Abrams published in the Manchester Evening News (17 January 1946) p. 2.		
"The Eight Years of War: Spanish Memories"		16 July 1944	OY	Published in The Observer		
The Emperor's New Clothes by Hans Christian Andersen		18 November 1943	WB	Adaptation of Andersen's short story as a radio drama by Orwell, broadcast by the BBC		
"The End of Henry Miller"		4 December 1942	—	Published in Tribune		
"Ends and Means"		26 May 1938	CEJL I, CW XI, OP	Letter to the editor in reply to A. Romney Green's letter on Aldous Huxley. Published in The New English Weekly Vol. XIII, No.7 (26 May 1938) p. 139.		
"England with the Knobs Off"		July 1940	—	Published in The Adelphi		
"England Your England"		19 February 1941	SSWtJ, EYE, CoE, OR, SE, FUF, OE	First published in The Lion and the Unicorn: Socialism and the English Genius		
England Your England and Other Essays		1953	—	Published by Secker and Warburg in London		
"The English Civil War"		24 August 1940	—	Published in New Statesman and Nation		
"The English People"		March 1944	CEJL III, EL, OE	Commissioned as a part of the series "Britain in Pictures" and written around spring of 1944, this essay was not published by HarperCollins as a pamphlet until 1947 due to paper rationing in World War II		
"English Poetry Since 1900"		13 June 1943	WB	Broadcast by the BBC		
English Ways by Jack Hilton; with an Introduction by John Middleton Murry and Photographs by J. Dixon Scott		July 1940	EL, OD	Book review published in The Adelphi		
"English Writing in Total War"		14 July 1941	—	Published in The New Republic		
"Entre Chien et Loup"		13 April 1940	—	Published in Time and Tide		
"Escape or Escapeism?"		30 November 1945	—	Published in Tribune		
"Espionage Trial in Spain: 'Pressure from Outside'"		5 August 1938	CW XI, OS	Letter to the editor published in The Manchester Guardian (5 August 1938) p. 18. The same letter was also sent to The New Statesman and Nation and The Daily Herald who did not print it.		
Essays		15 October 2002	—	Published by Alfred A. Knopf in New York City and Toronto as a part of Everyman's Library, edited by John Carey. There is also a Penguin Classics edition, with a smaller collection of essays, which was published in 2000.		
Esther Waters by George Moore, Our Mr Wrenn by Sinclair Lewis, Dr Serocold by Helen Ashton, The Owls' House by Crosbie Garstin, Hangman's House by Brian Oswald Donn-Byrne, Odd Craft by W. W. Jacobs, Naval Occasions by Bartimeus, My Man Jeeves by P. G. Wodehouse, and Autobiography volumes one and two by Margot Asquith		5 May 1936	CEJL I	Book review of several titles published by Penguin Group, published in New English Weekly		
"Eton Masters' Strike"		29 November 1919	CW X	Short story published unsigned in College Days No. 3, p. 90, possibly by Orwell		
"Evelyn Waugh"		April 1949	CEJL IV, EL	Unpublished and unfinished essay written c. April 1949		
"Eye-Witness in Barcelona"		August 1937	CW XI, OS	Article published in Controversy: The Socialist Forum, Vol. I, No. 11 (August 1937) pp. 85–88.		
"Eyes Left, Dress!"		17 February 1938	CEJL I, CW XI, OP	Review of Workers' Front by Fenner Brockway, published in The New English Weekly Vol. XII, No. 19 (17 February 1938) p. 368.		
"Excursions in Autobiography"		6 November 1937	CW XI	Review of Broken Water: An Autobiographical Excursion by James Hanley and I Wanted Wings by Beirne Lay, published in Time and Tide Vol. XVIII, No. 45 (6 November 1937) p. 1475.		
"Experientia Docet"		28 August 1937	CEJL I, CW XI	Review of The Men I Killed by F. P. Crozier, published in The New Statesman and Nation Vol. XIV (28 August 1937) p. 314.		
Facing Unpleasant Facts: Narrative Essays		13 October 2008	—	Published by Houghton Mifflin Harcourt in New York City, edited by George Packer. Companion volume to All Art Is Propaganda: Critical Essays		
"The Faith of Thomas Mann"		10 September 1943	—	Published in Tribune		
Faith, Reason and Civilisation by Harold Laski		13 March 1944	EL	Rejected book review submitted to Manchester Evening News		
"Far Away, Long Ago"		6 January 1946	CW XVIII	Review of The Nineteen-Twenties by Douglas Goldring, published in The Observer No. 8067 (6 January 1946) p. 3. Completed 25 December 1945.		
"A Farthing Newspaper"		29 December 1928	CEJL I, EL, OD	Published in G. K.'s Weekly, signed "Eric A. Blair"		
"Fascism and Democracy"		3 March 1941	—	Published in Betrayal of the Left by Victor Gollancz Ltd		
The Fate of the Middle Classes by Alec Brown		30 April 1936	CW X, EL	Book review published in The New English Weekly (Note: Orwell reviewed Alec Brown's The Fate of the Middle Classes on two separate occasions in the months following its 1936 publication, in April for The New English Weekly and in May for The Adelphi.)		
The Fate of the Middle Classes by Alec Brown		May 1936	CW X, OP	Book review published in The Adelphi		
"Fiction and Life"		9 November 1940	—	Published in Time and Tide		
"Films"		October 1940	–	Published in Time and Tide from October 1940 through August 1941		
"Five Travellers"		12 September 1936	—	Published in Time and Tide		
"For Ever Eton"		1 August 1948	OY	Published in The Observer		
"Foreign Policies"		5 April 1946	—	Published in Tribune		
Forward to The End of the 'Old School Tie'		1941	OD	By T. C. Worsley, published by Secker and Warburg		
The Fox by Ignazio Silone		9 September 1943	WB	Adaptation of Silone's short story as a radio drama by Orwell, broadcast by the BBC		
"France's Interest in the War Dwindles"		6 May 1945	OY, R	War report published in The Observer		
"Franco Spain"		21 December 1940	—	Published in Time and Tide		
"Franz Borkenau on the Communist International"		22 September 1938	CEJL I, CW XI, OP	Review of The Communist International by Franz Borkenau, published in the New English Weekly Vol. XIII, No. 24 (22 September 1938) pp. 357–358.		
"Freed Politicians Return to Paris"		13 May 1945	OY, R	War report published in The Observer		
"Freedom and Happiness"		4 January 1946	CEJL IV, CW XVIII	Review of We by Yevgeny Zamyatin, published in Tribune No. 471 (4 January 1946) pp. 15–16. Completed 31 December 1945.		
"Free Will"		3 June 1918	CW X	One-act play or dramatic sketch published unsigned in The Election Times No. 4, pp. 25–27. Reprinted in College Days No. 5 (9 July 1920) p. 129, also unsigned.		
"Freedom Defence Committee"		18 September 1948	CEJL IV	Published in Socialist Leader		
"Freedom of the Park"		7 December 1945	CEJL IV	Published in Tribune		
"The Freedom of the Press"		17 August 1945	EL	An introduction to Animal Farm published in London and later in New York City on 26 August 1946		
"The French Believe We Have Had a Revolution"		20 March 1945	R	War report published in Manchester Evening News		
"The French Election Will Be Influenced by the Fact That Women Will Have First Vote"		16 April 1945	R	War report published in Manchester Evening News		
"French Farce"		8 July 1945	OY	Published in The Observer		
"Friendship and love"		Summer 1921	CW X	Orwell's last poem to Jacintha Buddicom		
"From Tartary to Egypt"		15 August 1936	CW X	Review of News from Tartary by Peter Fleming, The Abyssinia I Knew by General Eric Virgin translated from the Swedish by Naomi Walford, and Canoe Errant on the Nile by Major R. Raven-Hart, published in Time and Tide		
"From the Notebooks of George Orwell"		June 1950	—	Published in World Review		
"The Frontiers of Art and Propaganda"		30 April 1941	CEJL II, EL	Initially broadcast over BBC Overseas Service on 30 April 1941, printed in The Listener on 29 May 1941		
"Funny, but Not Vulgar"		1 December 1944	CEJL III, EL	Published in Leader Magazine, 28 July 1945		
"Future of a Ruined Germany"		8 April 1945	OY, R	War report published in The Observer		
"Gandhi in Mayfair"		September 1943	CEJL II, EL	Book review of Beggar My Neighbour by Lionel Fielden published in Horizon		
"George Gissing"		May 1948	CEJL IV, EL	Unpublished essay, written May–June 1948		
George Orwell: A Life in Letters		10 May 2011	—	Edited by Peter Davison, published in London by Harvill Secker and in the United States by Penguin		
"The Germans Still Doubt Our Unity"		29 April 1945	OY, R	War report published in The Observer		
Glimpses and Reflections by John Galsworthy		12 March 1938	CEJL I, CW XI	Review of Glimpses and Reflections by John Galsworthy, published in the New Statesman and Nation Vol. XV (12 March) 1938) p. 428.		
"Going Down"		14 January 1945	OY	Published in The Observer		
"Good Bad Books"		2 November 1945	AAIP, CEJL IV, CW XVII, EL, ELp, SaE	Essay published in Tribune No. 462 (2 November 1945) p. 15. Completed 26 October 1945. Abridged version published in World Digest (February 1946) pp. 79–80.		
"Good Travellers"		2 December 1939	—	Published in Time and Tide		
"A Good Word for the Vicar of Bray"		26 April 1946	SaN, SaE, OR, CEJL IV, EL, ELp, FUF, STCM	Published in Tribune		
The Great Dictator		21 December 1940	AAIP	Film review published in Time and Tide		
Great Morning by Osbert Sitwell		July 1948	CEJL IV, EL	Book review published in The Adelphi, July/September 1948		
"The Green Flag"		28 October 1945	CEJL IV, EL, OY	Review of Drums Under the Windows by Seán O'Casey, published in The Observer		
"Grounds for Dismay"		9 April 1944	OY	Published in The Observer		
"Guerillas"		14 December 1940	—	Published in New Statesman and Nation		
"A Hanging"		August 1931	CEJL I, ColE, DotEM, EL, ELp, FUF, OP, OR, SaE, WIW	Published in The Adelphi, reprinted in The New Savoy in 1946, signed "Eric A. Blair"		
"A Happy Vicar I Might Have Been"		1935	—	Poem		
"Herman Melville"		March 1930	CEJL I, CW X	Review of Herman Melville: A Study of His Life and Vision by Lewis Mumford, published in The New Adelphi, Vol. III, No. 3 (March–May 1930), pp. 206–208, signed "E. A. Blair"		
"Hidden Spain"		28 November 1943	OY	Published in The Observer		
"History Books"		21 September 1940	—	Published in New Statesman and Nation		
"Holding Out"		14 September 1940	—	Published in New Statesman and Nation		
Homage to Catalonia		25 April 1938	CN, CW VI, OR (excerpts), OS	Published by Secker and Warburg in London on 25 April 1938 and by Harcourt, Brace and Company in New York on 15 May 1952.		
"Homage to Catalonia"		14 May 1938	CW XI, OS	Letter to the editor in response to a review of Homage to Catalonia by Maurice Percy Ashley (30 April 1938). Published in The Times Literary Supplement (14 May 1938) p. 336.		
"Homage to Catalonia"		28 May 1938	CW XI, OS	A second letter to the editor in response to Maurice Percy Ashley's review of Homage to Catalonia. Published in The Times Literary Supplement (28 May 1938) p. 370.		
"Hop-Picking"		17 October 1931	CEJL I, OE	Published in The New Statesman and Nation, a longer version appears in Collected Essays, Journalism and Letters I		
"How a Nation is Exploited: The British Empire in Burma"		December 1928	OP	Published in French in Progrès Civique, in instalments between December 1928 and May 1929		
"How the Poor Die"		November 1946	CEJL IV, ColE, DotEM, EL, ELp, FUF, OD, OR, SaE	Published in Now number six		
"How to Escape"		27 January 1946	CW XVIII	Review of Horned Pigeon by George Millar. Published in The Observer No. 8070 (27 January 1946) p. 3.		
"A Hundred Up"		13 February 1944	CEJL III, EL, OY	Book review of Martin Chuzzlewit by Charles Dickens published in The Observer		
"Imaginary Interview: George Orwell and Jonathan Swift"		2 November 1942	EL, WB	Broadcast by BBC African Service, titled by West as "Jonathan Swift, an Imaginary Interview"		
"Impenetrable Mystery"		9 June 1938	CEJL I, CW XI, EL, OP	Review of Assignment in Utopia by Eugene Lyons, published in New English Weekly Vol. XIII, No. 9 (9 June 1938) pp. 169–170.		
In a Strange Land: Essays by Eric Gill by Eric Gill		9 July 1944	EL, OY	Book review published in The Observer		
"In Defence of Comrade Zilliacus"		August 1947	CEJL IV, EL	Unpublished essay intended for Tribune, August/September 1947		
"In Defence of English Cooking"		15 December 1945	CEJL III, EL, ELp, FUF, STCM	Published in Evening Standard		
"In Defence of P. G. Wodehouse"		July 1945	CEJL III, ColE, CrE, EL, ELp, OD, OR, STCM	Published in The Windmill number two		
"In Defence of the Novel"		12 November 1936	CEJL I, EL	Published in two issues of New English Weekly from 12 and 19 November 1936		
"In Front of Your Nose"		22 March 1946	CEJL IV, EL, FUF	Published in Tribune		
"In Pursuit of Lord Acton"		29 March 1946	—	Published in Tribune		
"In the Firing Line"		2 January 1944	OY	Published in The Observer		
"Inside the Pages in Paris"		28 February 1945	R	War report published in Manchester Evening News		
"Indian Ink"		29 October 1944	OY	Published in The Observer		
"Indian Mosaic"		15 July 1936	OP	Review of Indian Mosaic by Mark Channing; Orwell's first paid review for The Listener, unsigned.		
"Indian Passengers"		31 January 1946	CW XVIII	Letter to the editor published in The Manchester Guardian (31 January 1946) p. 4.		
"Inside the Whale"		11 March 1940	ItW, SSWtJ, EYE, CoE, SE, ColE, CEJL I, EL, ELp, AAIP	Published as part of Inside the Whale and Other Essays		
Inside the Whale and Other Essays		11 March 1940	—	Published by Victor Gollancz Ltd on 11 March 1940. A different publication by the same name—identical to Selected Essays—was released in the United Kingdom in 1962.		
"The Intellectual Revolt 1"		24 January 1946	CW XVIII, EL, OP	First part of a four-part series of essays. Published in the Manchester Evening News (24 January 1946) p. 2. (Note: Orwell conceived of the four-part series, "The Intellectual Revolt", "What Is Socialism?", "The Christian Reformers" and "Pacifism and Progress", as a single entity and possibly also intended the series to later be published as a pamphlet. He also wrote an afterword in April 1946 for a German abridged translation published in Neue Auslese aus dem Schrifttum der Gegenwart No. 8 (August 1946). The original English typescript of the afterword has not survived, but a new English translation from German is published in The Complete Works, Vol. 18.)		
"The Intellectual Revolt – 2: What is Socialism?"		31 January 1946	CW XVIII, EL, OP	Second part of a four-part series of essays. Published in the Manchester Evening News (31 January 1946) p. 2.		
"The Intellectual Revolt – 3: The Christian Reformers"		7 February 1946	CW XVIII, EL, OP	Third part of a four-part series of essays. Published in the Manchester Evening News (7 February 1946) p. 2.		
"The Intellectual Revolt – 4: Pacifism and Progress"		14 February 1946	CW XVIII, EL, OP	Final part of a four-part series of essays. Published in the Manchester Evening News (14 February 1946) p. 2.		
An Interlude in Spain by Charles d'Ydewalle, translated by Eric Sutton		24 December 1944	EL, OY	Published in The Observer		
Introduction to Love of Life and Other Stories by Jack London		October 1945	CEJL IV, EL	Introduction to this compilation published in the United Kingdom, October–November 1945		
Introduction to The Position of Peggy Harper by Leonard Merrick		December 1945	CEJL IV	Introduction to an intended reprinting of the text that was never published, written in winter 1945		
Introduction to the French edition of Down and Out in Paris and London		8 May 1935	CEJL I, OD	Introduction to the book published as La Vache Enragée by Éditions Gallimard		
"An Ironic Poem About Prostitution		1935	—	Poem from some time before 1936		
"Is There Any Truth in Spiritualism?"		9 July 1920	CW X	Monologue published in College Days No. 5, p. 140, signed "The Bishop of Borstall"[sic]		
"It Looks Different from Abroad"		2 December 1946	—	Article published in The New Republic		
"Jack London"		5 March 1943	WB	Broadcast by the BBC		
James Joyce by Harry Levin		2 March 1944	EL	Book review published in Manchester Evening News		
"John Galsworthy"		23 March 1929	—	Published in French in Monde		
"Obstacles to Joint Rule in Germany"		27 May 1945	OY, R	War report published in The Observer		
"Joseph Conrad"		April 1949	CEJL IV	Unpublished and unfinished essay written c. April 1949		
"Just Junk – But Who Could Resist It?"		5 January 1946	CW XVIII, EL, OE	Published as a Saturday Essay in Evening Standard (5 January 1946) p. 6		
Keep the Aspidistra Flying		20 April 1936	CN, CW IV, OR (excerpts)	Published by Victor Gollancz, Ltd in London on 20 April 1936.		
"Kitchener"		21 July 1916	CW X	Poem published in the Henley and South Oxfordshire Standard Vol. XXVI, No. 1549, p. 3, signed "E. A. Blair"		
Lady Gregory's Journals, edited by Lennox Robinson		19 April 1947	EL	Book review published in The New Yorker		
"Lady Windermere's Fan"		21 November 1943	WB	Commentary on Oscar Wilde's play broadcast by the BBC		
Landfall: A Channel Story by Nevil Shute and Nailcruncher by Albert Cohen, translated by Vyvyan Holland		7 December 1940	CEJL II	Book review published in New Statesman and Nation		
"Lear, Tolstoy and the Fool"		7 March 1947	SaE, OR, SE, ColE, CEJL IV, EL, ELp, AAIP, STCM	Published in Polemic		
"The Lesser Evil"		1924	—	Poem		
"The Lessons of War"		February 1940	—	Published in Horizon		
"Letter from England to Partisan Review"		March 1943	CEJL II	Published in Partisan Review, March/April 1943		
"Letters on India"		19 March 1943	OP	Review of Letters on India by Mulk Raj Anand; Published in Tribune		
Letter to the editor		22 June 1940	CEJL II, EL	Published in Time and Tide		
Letter to the editor		12 October 1942	CEJL II	Unpublished letter addressed to The Times		
Letter to the editor		26 June 1945	CEJL III	Unpublished letter addressed to Tribune		
Letter to the editor		18 January 1946	CW XVIII	Letter to the editor, protesting against the arrest of Philip Sansom, circulated to the press by the Freedom Defence Committee and signed by Orwell and 24 others. (Note: Orwell was vice-chairman of the Freedom Defence Committee. The other signatories were Arthur Ballard, Gerald Brenan, Vera Brittain, Fenner Brockway, Alex Comfort, Cyril Connolly, Rhys J. Davies, Bob Edwards, Laurence Housman, Augustus John, H. J. Laski, Stuart Morris, Sidney Vere Pearson, R. S. W. Pollard, Herbert Read, Frank Ridley, Harry Roberts, D. S. Savage, Clare Sheridan, J. Allen Skinner, Dinah Stock, Julian Symons, Michael Tippett, Wilfred Wellock and George Woodcock) Published as "'Cat and Mouse' Case" in The Manchester Guardian (18 January 1946) p. 4; in Tribune No. 473 (18 January 1946) p. 13; in Peace News (18 January 1946) p. 4; as "The Sansom Case" in The Daily Herald (21 January 1946) p. 2; in The New Leader (26 January 1946) p. 7; in Freedom – Through Anarchism (26 January 1946) p. 1; as "Cat and Mouse Treatment" in the Freedom Defence Committee Bulletin No. 2 (February–March 1946) p. 2.		
Letter to the editor		June 1946	CEJL IV	Konni Zilliacus wrote an open letter in response to Orwell's "London Letter" 15, and Orwell wrote a response, both of which were published in this issue of Tribune, Summer 1946		
"Liberal Intervention Aids Labour"		1 July 1945	OY	Published in The Observer		
"The Limit to Pessimism"		25 April 1940	CEJL I, EL	Review of The Thirties by Malcolm Muggeridge, published in the New English Weekly		
"The Lion and the Unicorn: Socialism and the English Genius"		19 January 1941	CEJL II, EL, ELp, OR, WIW, OP (Note: Only the last two parts of the essay; first part "England Your England" is in Orwell's England)	Published by Secker and Warburg as Searchlight Books No. 1		
"Literature and the Left"		4 June 1943	CEJL II, EL, OP	Published in Tribune		
"Literature and Totalitarianism"		21 May 1941	CEJL II, EL	Initially broadcast over BBC Overseas Service, printed in The Listener on 19 June 1941		
"A Little Poem"		1935	—	Poem		
The Lively Lady by Kenneth Roberts, War Paint by F. V. Morley, Long Shadows by Lady Sanderson, Who Goes Home? by Richard Curle, and Gaudy Night by Dorothy Sayers		23 January 1936	CEJL I	Book review published in New English Weekly		
"London Letters" #1		March 1941	CEJL II, OP (excerpt)	The first of several pieces of correspondence published in Partisan Review, March/April 1941		
"London Letters" #2		March 1941	CEJL II	Published in Partisan Review, March/April 1941		
"London Letters" #3		July 1941	CEJL II, OP (excerpt)	Published in Partisan Review, July/August 1941		
"London Letters" #4		November 1941	CEJL II	Published in Partisan Review, November/December 1941		
"London Letters" #5		March 1942	CEJL II	Published in Partisan Review, March/April 1942		
"London Letters" #6		July 1942	CEJL II	Published in Partisan Review, July/August 1942; also known as "The British Crisis"		
"London Letters" #7		November 1942	CEJL II	Published in Partisan Review, November/December 1942		
"London Letters" #8		March 1943	CEJL II, OP	Published in Partisan Review, March/April 1943		
"London Letters" #9		July 1943	CEJL II	Published in Partisan Review, July/August 1943		
"London Letters" #10		March 1944	CEJL III	Published in Partisan Review, Spring 1944; sent 15 January 1944		
"London Letters" #11		June 1944	CEJL III	Published in Partisan Review, Summer 1944; sent 17 April 1944		
"London Letters" #12		December 1944	CEJL III	Published in Partisan Review, Winter 1944; sent 24 July 1944		
"London Letters" #13		June 1945	CEJL III	Published in Partisan Review, Summer 1945; sent 5 June 1945		
"London Letters" #14		September 1945	CEJL III	Published in Partisan Review, Fall 1945; sent c. 15 August 1945		
"London Letters" #15		June 1946	CEJL IV	Published in Partisan Review, Summer 1946; sent early May 1946		
"Looking Back on the Spanish War"		1943	SSWtJ, EYE, CoE, ColE, CEJL II, EL, ELp, FUF	Published in New Road, probably written in 1942		
"Looking Before and After"		21 October 1939	CW XI	Review of Green Worlds by Maurice G. Hindus and I Haven't Unpacked by William Holt, published in Time and Tide		
"A Lost World"		1 February 1948	OY	Published in The Observer		
"The Lure of Atrocity"		23 June 1938	CW XI, OS	Review of Spain's Ordeal by Robert Sencourt and Franco's Rule by anonymous, published in The New English Weekly Vol. XIII, No. 11 (23 June 191938) p, 210. (Note: Orwell reviewed the three works together under the headline "Spanish Tragedy" in Time and Tide, 16 July 1938. Searchlight on Spain was also review separately by Orwell in The New English Weekly, 21 July 1938, The Civil War in Spain, in The New Leader, 8 July 1938 and Spain's Ordeal, in The New English Weekly, 23 June 1938.)		
"The Lure of Profundity"		30 December 1937	CW XI	Review of Invertebrate Spain by José Ortega y Gasset, published in the New English Weekly Vol. XII, No. 12 (30 December 1937) pp. 235–236.		
"Macbeth"		17 October 1943	WB	Commentary on William Shakespeare's play broadcast by the BBC		
The Machiavellians by James Burnham		20 January 1944	EL	Book review published in Manchester Evening News		
"The Man and the Maid"		c. 1916–1918	CW X	Play (incomplete), manuscript, 26 ff.		
"Man from the Sea"		24 June 1945	OY	Published in The Observer		
"The Man in Kid Gloves"		June 1929	—	Short story that was written before the summer of 1929 and has not survived		
Many Are Called by Edward Newhouse		1951	LO	This book blurb is considered by Davison to be a spurious attribution to Orwell; no other compendium has included it.		
"Mark Twain – The Licensed Jester"		26 November 1943	CEJL II	Published in Tribune		
"Marrakech"		25 December 1939	SSWtJ, CoE, ColE, CEJL I, EL, ELp, FUF	Published in New Writing, New Series number three		
"Marx and Russia"		15 February 1948	EL, OY	Published in The Observer		
"The Meaning of a Poem"		7 May 1941	CEJL II, EL	Initially broadcast over BBC Overseas Service on 14 May 1941, printed in The Listener on 5 June 1941		
"The Meaning of Sabotage"		29 January 1942	WB	Broadcast by the BBC		
"The Millionaire's Pearl"		9 July 1920	CW X	Short story published unsigned in College Days No. 5, pp. 152, 154, 156		
Mein Kampf by Adolf Hitler, unabridged translation		21 March 1940	CEJL II, EL, OP, JaA	Book review published in The New English Weekly		
"Men of the Isles"		29 February 1948	EL, OY	Book review of The Atlantic Islands by Kenneth Williamson, published in The Observer		
"Milton in Striped Trousers"		12 October 1945	—	Published in Tribune		
Milton: Man and Thinker by Denis Saurat		20 August 1944	EL, OY	Book review published in The Observer		
Mind at the End of its Tether by H. G. Wells		8 November 1945	EL	Book review published in Manchester Evening News		
"Mis-Observation"		26 October 1940	—	Published in New Statesman and Nation		
"Money and Guns"		20 January 1942	WB, EL	Published in Through Eastern Eyes and broadcast by the BBC		
"The Moon Under Water"		9 February 1946	CEJL III, CW XVIII, EL, FUF	Published as a Saturday Essay in Evening Standard (9 February 1946) p. 6. Reprinted in SEAC: The All-Services Newspaper of South East Asia Command (20 April 1946) p. 2.		
"More News from Tartary"		4 September 1937	CW XI	Review of Forbidden Journey by Ella K. Maillart translated from the French by Thomas MacGreevy, published in Time and Tide Vol. XVIII, No. 36 (4 September 1937) p. 1175.		
"My Country Right or Left"		September 1940	CEJL I, EL, ELp, FUF, OE	Published in Folios of New Writing, number two, Autumn 1940		
"Moscow and Madrid"		20 January 1940	CEJL I	Review of The Last Days of Madrid by S. Casado, translated by Rupert Croft-Cooke, and Behind the Battle by T. C. Worsley, published in Time and Tide Vol. 21, No. 3, p. 62	—	Published in New York Times Book Review
"Mr Joad's Point of View"		8 June 1940	—	Published in Time and Tide		
"Mr Simpson and the Supernatural"		4 June 1920	CW X	Short story published unsigned in Bubble and Squeak No. 2, pp. 40–42, probably by Orwell		
"Mr Sludge"		6 June 1948	OY	Published in The Observer		
"Mrs Puffin and the Missing Matches"		c. 1919–1922	CW X	Short story, handwritten manuscript, date very uncertain		
"A Muffled Voice"		10 June 1945	OY	Published in The Observer		
"My Epitaph by John Flory"		1934	CEJL I	A passage edited from Burmese Days		
My Life: The Autobiography of Havelock Ellis by Havelock Ellis		May 1940	EL	Book review published in The Adelphi		
"Nationalism"		14 May 1943	—	Published in Tribune		
"New Words"		February 1940	CEJL II, EL	Unpublished, written in February–April 1940		
"New World"		17 September 1944	OY	Published in The Observer		
"A New Year Message"		5 January 1945	CEJL III	Published in Tribune		
"A Nice Cup of Tea"		12 January 1946	CEJL III, CW XVIII, EL, FUF	Published as a Saturday Essay in Evening Standard (12 January 1946) p. 6. Reprinted as "Ten Steps to a Good Cup of Char" in SEAC: The All-Services Newspaper of South East Asia Command (14 February 1946) p. 2.		
"Nicholas Moore vs. George Orwell"		January 1942	—	Published in Partisan Review, January/February 1942		
The Nigger of the 'Narcissus', Typhoon, The Shadow-Line, Within the Tides by Joseph Conrad		24 June 1945	CEJL III, OY	Book review published in Observer		
Nineteen Eighty-Four		8 June 1949	CN, CW IX, OR (excerpts)	Published by Secker and Warburg in London on 8 June 1949.		
Nineteen Eighty-Four: The Facsimile of the Extant Manuscript		May 1984	—	Published by Houghton Mifflin Harcourt in May 1984 (ISBN 978-0-15-166034-6).		
"No, Not One"		October 1941	CEJL II, EL, AAIP	Book review of No Such Liberty by Alex Comfort published in The Adelphi		
Noblesse Oblige—Another Letter to My Son by Osbert Sitwell		30 November 1944	CEJL III	Book review published in Manchester Evening News. James Agate wrote a response to Orwell published on 21 December 1944 and Orwell responded to this (with a piece named "A Controversy: Agate: Orwell" in Collected Essays, Journalism and Letters III) in the same issue.		
"Nonsense Poetry: The Lear Omnibus Edited by R. L. Mégroz"		21 December 1945	SaE, CEJL IV, EL, ELp	Published in Tribune		
"Not Counting Niggers"		July 1939	CEJL I, CW XI, EL, OP	Review of Union Now by Clarence K. Streit published in The Adelphi		
"Not Enough Money: A Sketch of George Gissing"		2 April 1943	EL, OD	Published in Tribune		
"Notes on Nationalism"		October 1945	EYE, ColE, DotEM, CEJL III, EL, ELp, OP	Published in Polemic: A Magazine of Philosophy, Psychology & Aesthetics, number one		
"Notes on the Spanish Militias"		c. 1938–1939	CEJL I, CW XI, EL, OS	Unpublished notes, compiled c. 1938–1939 (Note: It is unknown when Orwell wrote these notes. Davison posits a date of composition in early 1939 or possible earlier, writing that "[the] notes may have been written when Orwell was working on Homage to Catalonia, but more probably after its publication." A later date is, however, also possible, Davison adds that Orwell's friend Geoffrey Gorer "guessed their date of composition as summer 1940, after Dunkirk, for someone at the War Office interested in the experience of militias as resistance fighters.")		
"Review of Memoirs of Sergeant Bourgogne"	Review	29 March 1940	CW XII	Published in Tribune		
"Notes on the Way"		30 March 1940	CEJL II, EL, OD	Published in two issues of Time and Tide, 30 March and 6 April 1940		
"Note to Whitehall's Road to Mandalay by Robert Duval"		2 April 1943	—	Published in Tribune		
"Now Germany Faces Hunger"		4 May 1945	R	War report published in Manchester Evening News		
"Nuremberg and the Moscow Trials"		March 1946	CEJL IV, CW XVIII	Letter to the editor on the Nuremberg Trials and charges made against Leon Trotsky in the Moscow Trials of conspiring with Nazi Germany. Signed by Orwell and 14 others. (Note: The other signatories were H. G. Wells, John Baird, Fred Longden, Peter Freeman, Frank Ridley, C. A. Smith, Arthur Ballard, Paul Potts, Julian Symons, C. E. M. Joad, Arthur Koestler, Henry Sara, George Padmore and J. F. Horrabin. Longden and Freeman were not signatories of the abridged version in Forward.) Dated 25 February 1946 and published in Socialist Appeal (March 1946) p. 3. Also issued by Socialist Appeal as a handbill. Abridged version published in Forward (16 March 1946) p. 7.		
"Occupation's Effect on French Outlook"		4 March 1945	OY, R	War report published in The Observer		
"Ode to Field Days"		1 April 1920	CW X	Poem published unsigned in College Days No. 4, p. 114, probably by Orwell		
Of Ants and Men by Caryl Parker Haskins		5 May 1946	EL, OY	Published in The Observer		
"Old George's Almanac"		28 December 1945	—	Published in Tribune, signed "Crystal-Gazer Orwell"		
"Old Master"		26 March 1944	OY	Published in The Observer		
"On a Ruined Farm Near the His Master's Voice Gramophone Factory"		April 1934	CEJL I, OE	Poem published in The Adelphi, later selected for The Best Poems of 1934 by Thomas Moult		
"On Housing"		25 January 1946	CEJL IV, CW XVIII	Review of The Reilly Plan by Lawrence Wolfe. Published in Tribune No. 474 (25 January 1946) p 6.		
"On Kipling's Death"		23 January 1936	CEJL I, EL	Published in New English Weekly		
"On the Brink"		13 July 1940	—	Published in New Statesman and Nation		
"Orwell on Churchill: A Critic Views a Statesman"		14 May 1949	CEJL IV, CW XX	Review of Their Finest Hour by Winston Churchill, published in The New Leader (14 May 1949) p. 10		
The Orwell Reader, Fiction, Essays, and Reportage		1956	—	Published by Harcourt, Brace, Jovanovich in New York City		
"Our Minds Are Married, but We Are Too Young"		Christmas 1918	CW X	Poem given to Jacintha Buddicom		
"Our Opportunity"		January 1941	—	Published in Left News		
"Our Own Have-Nots"		27 November 1937	CW XI	Review of The Problem of the Distressed Areas by Wal Hannington, Grey Children by James Hanley and The Fight for the Charter by Gordon Neil Stewart, published in Time and Tide Vol. XVIII, No. 48 (27 November 1937) p. 1588.		
"Out of Step"		7 November 1943	OY	Published in The Observer		
"Outside and Inside Views"		8 June 1939	CW XI	Review of The Mysterious Mr Bull by Wyndham Lewis and The School for Dictators by Ignazio Silone, published in The New English Weekly		
"Oysters and Brown Stout"		22 November 1944	CEJL III, EL	Published in Tribune		
"Pacifism and the War"		September 1942	CEJL II	Correspondence between Orwell, Alex Comfort, D. S. Savage, and George Woodcock, published in Partisan Review, September/October 1942; also known as "A Controversy"		
"The Pagan"		Autumn 1918	CW X	Poem sent to Jacintha Buddicom		
"Pamphlet Literature"		9 January 1943	CEJL II	Published in New Statesman and Nation		
"Paris Is Not France"		12 September 1943	OY	Published in The Observer		
"Paris Puts a Gay Face on Her Miseries"		25 February 1945	LO, R	War report published in The Observer		
"Patriots and Revolutionaries"		3 March 1941	—	Published in Betrayal of the Left by Victor Gollancz Ltd		
"A Peep into the Future"		3 June 1918	CW X	Short story published unsigned in The Election Times No. 4, pp. 15–24		
"The People's Victory"		15 February 1941	—	Published in New Statesman and Nation		
"Perfide Albion"		21 November 1942	—	Published in New Statesman and Nation		
"Personal Notes on Scientifiction"		21 July 1945	EL	Published in Leader Magazine		
Personal Record by Julien Green		13 April 1940	CEJL II	Book review published in Time and Tide		
"The Photographer"		9 July 1920	CW X	Poem published unsigned in College Days No. 5, p. 130		
"The Petition Crown"		June 1929	—	Short story that was written before mid-1929 and has not survived		
"Pity and Terror"		7 October 1945	EL, OY	Review of The Brothers Karamazov and Crime and Punishment by Fyodor Dostoevsky, translated by Constance Garnett, published in The Observer		
"Pleasure Spots"		11 January 1946	CEJL IV, CW XVIII, EL	Essay published in Tribune (11 January 1946) pp. 10–11.		
"Poet and Priest"		12 November 1944	OY	Published in The Observer		
"Poet in Darkness"		31 December 1944	OY	Published in The Observer		
"Poetry and the Microphone"		March 1945	CEJL II, ColE, EL, ELp, EYE, OE, SSWtJ	Published in The New Saxon Pamphlet number three, probably written in the summer of 1943		
"Points of View"		December 1944	—	Published in Poetry		
"The Political Aims of the French Resistance"		7 March 1945	R	War report published in Manchester Evening News		
"Political Reflections on the Crisis"		December 1938	CW XI, EL, OP	Article published in The Adelphi		
"Politics and the English Language"		11 December 1945	AAIP, CEJL IV, CoE, ColE, EL, ELp, OR, SaE, SE, WIW	Published independently as a Payments Book, later printed in Horizon, April 1946		
"The Politics of Starvation"		18 January 1946	CEJL IV, CW XVIII, EL	Essay published in Tribune No. 473 (18 January 1946) pp. 9–10.		
"Politics vs. Literature: An Examination of Gulliver's Travels"		September 1946	SaE, OR, SE, ColE, CEJL IV, EL, ELp, AAIP, STCM	Published in Polemic, September/October 1946		
"Portrait of the General"		2 August 1942	OY	Published in The Observer		
"Poverty – Plain and Coloured"		1931	—	Published in The Adelphi		
"Power House"		23 April 1944	OY	Published in The Observer		
"Preface to the Ukrainian edition of Animal Farm"		March 1947	CEJL III, EL	Published in Polemic, January 1946, reprinted in The Atlantic Monthly, March 1947		
"The Prevention of Literature"		January 1946	AAIP, CEJL IV, ColE, CW XVII, EL, ELp, OR, SaE, SE	Essay published in Polemic No. 2 (January 1946) pp. 4–14, abridged version published in The Atlantic Monthly pp. 115–119 (March 1947). Completed 12 November 1945.		
"Prime Minister"		4 July 1948	OY	Published in The Observer		
"A Prize for Ezra Pound"		May 1949	CEJL IV, EL, JaA	Published in Partisan Review, also entitled "The Question of the Pound Award"		
"Problem Picture"		7 November 1948	CEJL IV, EL, OY, JaA	Book review of Portrait of the Anti-Semite by Jean-Paul Sartre, published in The Observer		
"The Proletarian Writer"		6 December 1940	CEJL II, OD	A discussion with Desmond Hawkins, initially broadcast over BBC Home Service, printed in The Listener on 19 December 1940		
"Propaganda and Demotic Speech"		June 1944	CEJL III, EL, AAIP	Published in Persuasion volume two, number two, Summer 1944		
"Propagandist Critics"		31 December 1936	CEJL I, CW X, EL	Review of The Novel To-Day by Philip Henderson, published in The New English Weekly Vol. X, No. 12, pp. 229–230		
"Prophecies of Fascism"		12 June 1940	CEJL II	Published in Tribune		
D. H. Lawrence's Short Stories		16 November 1945	CEJL IV, EL	Book review of The Prussian Officer and Other Stories published in Tribune		
The Pub and the People by Mass Observation		21 January 1943	CEJL III	Book review published in The Listener		
"Public Schoolboys"		14 September 1940	EL, OD	Review of Barbarians and Philistines: Democracy and the Public Schools by T. C. Worsley, published in Time and Tide		
"Puritan Poet"		20 August 1944	OY	Published in The Observer		
"A Questionable Shape"		18 July 1948	OY	Published in The Observer		
"Raffles and Miss Blandish"		28 August 1944	AAIP, CEJL III, CoE, ColE, CrE, DotEM, EL, ELp, OD	Published in Horizon, October 1944 and politics, November 1944		
"The Re-Discovery of Europe"		10 March 1942	CEJL II, EL	Broadcast as the first instalment of "Literature Between Wars" by BBC Eastern Service, published in The Listener on 19 March 1942		
"Real Adventure"		18 July 1936	CW X	Review of Tempest Over Mexico by Rosa E. King and Rolling Stonemason by Fred Bower, published in Time and Tide		
"Recent Novels"		23 July 1936	CEJL I, CW X, EL	Review of The Rock Pool by Cyril Connolly, Almayer's Folly by Joseph Conrad, The Wallet of Kai Lung by Ernest Bramah, Anna of the Five Towns by Arnold Bennett, Mr Fortune, Please by H. C. Bailey and The Rocklitz by George R. Preedy, published in The New English Weekly		
"Red, White, and Brown"		4 July 1940	—	Published in Time and Tide		
"Reflections on Gandhi"		January 1949	SaE, CoE, OR, CEJL IV, EL, ELp, AAIP, CW XX	Published in Partisan Review		
"Reply to Horizon Questionnaire"		1947	—	Published in the book British Thought, published by Gresham Press in New York, 1947		
"Return Journey"		9 July 1944	OY	Published in The Observer		
"Return of the Past"		10 January 1946	CW XVIII	Review of The Crater's Edge by Stephen Bagnall and Born of the Desert by Malcolm James, published in the Manchester Evening News (10 January 1946) p. 2.		
"Revenge Is Sour"		9 November 1945	CEJL IV, EL, FUF, R, JaA	Published in Tribune		
"Review of 'Homage to Catalonia'"		16 June 1938	CW XI, OS	Letter to the editor in response to a review of Homage to Catalonia by Philip Furneaux Jordan (25 May 1938). Published in The Listener (16 June 1938) p. 1295.		
Review of Alexander Pope by Edith Sitwell and The Course of English Classicism by Sherard Vines		June 1930	CEJL I, CW X	Untitled book review published in The New Adelphi, Vol. III, No. 4 (June–August 1930), pp. 338–340, signed "E. A. Blair"		
Review of Angel Pavement by J. B. Priestley		October 1930	CEJL I, STATA	Originally published under the title "A Good 'Middle'" in The Adelphi, signed "E. A. Blair"		
"Review of Criticisms and Opinions of the Works of Charles Dickens by G.K. Chesterton"		December 1933	STATA	Published in The Adelphi		
"Review of Dickens: His Character, Comedy and Career by Hesketh Pearson"		15 May 1949	CW XX	Originally titled Mr. Dickens Sits For His Portrait; published in New York Times Book Review		
"Revolt in the Urban Desert"		10 October 1943	OY	Published in The Observer		
"Riding Down from Bangor"		22 November 1946	SaE, CEJL IV, EL, ELp	Published in Tribune		
"The Right to Free Expression"		September 1946	—	Written by Randall Swingler with commentary from Orwell, published in Polemic, September/October 1946		
A Roadman's Day		15 March 1941	CW XXIII, OD	Published in Picture Post		
The Road to Serfdom by Friedrich Hayek and The Mirror of the Past by Konni Zilliacus		9 April 1943	CEJL III, OY	Book review published in Observer		
The Road to Wigan Pier		8 March 1937	CW V, EYE (chs. 2 and 7), (Note: In the collection England Your England and Other Essays chapter two of The Road to Wigan Pier is reprinted as "Down the Mine" and chapter seven as "North and South".) OD, OR (excerpts), SE (ch. 2) (Note: In the collection Selected Essays chapter two of The Road to Wigan Pier is reprinted under the title "Down the Mine".)	Published by Victor Gollancz, Ltd in London on 8 March 1937		
"The Road to Wigan Pier Diary"		31 January 1936	CEJL I	Excerpts of Orwell's diary		
"Romance"		1925	—	Poem		
"The Romantic Case"		23 July 1941	OY	Published in The Observer		
"Rudyard Kipling"		February 1942	AAIP, CEJL II, CoE, CrE, DotEM, EL, ELp, OD, OR	Published in Horizon		
"The Ruling Class"		December 1940	—	Published in Horizon, later incorporated into "The Lion and the Unicorn"		
"Russian Regime"		12 January 1939	CEJL I, CW XI, EL, OP	Review of Russia Under Soviet Rule by Nicolas de Basily published in The New English Weekly		
"Ruth Pitter's Poetry"		February 1940	—	Published in The Adelphi		
"The Sanctified Sinner"		17 July 1948	CEJL IV, EL, AAIP	Book review of The Heart of the Matter by Graham Greene, published in The New Yorker		
"Satirical Bullseyes"		7 September 1945	—	Published in Tribune		
"The Sea God"		June 1929	—	Short story that was written before the summer of 1929 and has not survived		
Second Thoughts on James Burnham		May 1946	CEJL IV, ColE, CW XVIII, EL, OR, SaE	Essay published in Polemic, and later the same year reprinted as a separate pamphlet by the Socialist Book Club as James Burnham and the Managerial Revolution		
Selected Essays		1957	—	Published by Penguin Group in London		
"Sensitive Plant"		13 January 1946	CW XVIII	Review of The Collected Stories of Katherine Mansfield by Katherine Mansfield published in The Observer No. 8068 (13 January 1946) p. 3.		
"The Slack-bob"		3 June 1918	CW X	Short story published unsigned in The Election Times No. 4, pp. 29–32. Revised and reprinted in College Days No. 5 (9 July 1920) p. 146, also unsigned.		
"Shooting an Elephant"		September 1936	CEJL I, CoE, ColE, EL, ELp, FUF, OP, OR, SaE, SE, STCM	Published in New Writing, number two, Autumn 1936, broadcast on the BBC Home Service 12 October 1948		
Shooting an Elephant and Other Essays		5 October 1950	—	Published by Secker and Warburg in London		
"Singing Men"		26 November 1944	OY	Published in The Observer		
A Slip Under the Microscope by H. G. Wells		9 September 1943	WB	Adaptation of Wells' short story as a radio drama by Orwell, broadcast by the BBC		
"A Smoking Room Story"		April 1949	CEJL IV	Unfinished story from his notebook		
"So Runs the World"		22 July 1945	OY	Published in The Observer		
"Socialists Answer Our Questions on the War"		November 1941	—	Published in Left News		
"Some Recent Novels"		14 November 1935	CEJL I, CW X, EL	Review of Tropic of Cancer by Henry Miller and The Wolf at the Door by Robert Francis, translated by Fraçoise Delisle, published in The New English Weekly		
"Some Thoughts on the Common Toad"		12 April 1946	SaE, OR, CEJL IV, EL, ELp, FUF	Published in Tribune		
"Sometimes in the Middle Autumn Days"		March 1933	—	Poem published in The Adelphi, signed "Eric Blair"		
"Songs We Used to Sing"		19 January 1946	CW XVIII, EL	Published as a Saturday Essay in Evening Standard (19 January 1946) p. 6. Abridged version published in SEAC: The All-Services Newspaper of South East Asia Command (25 March 1946).		
"Spain: Today and Yesterday"		9 October 1937	CEJL I (excerpt), CW XI, OS	Review of Red Spanish Notebook by Mary Low and Juan Brea, Heroes of the Alcazar by Rodolphe Timmermans and Spanish Circus by Martin Armstrong, published in Time and Tide Vol. XVIII, No. 41 (9 October) pp. 1334–1335.		
"Spain: The True and the False"		8 July 1938	CEJL I, CW XI, EL, OS	Review of The Civil War in Spain by Frank Jellinek, published in The New Leader (8 July 1938) p. 7., with a correction published on 13 January 1939.		
"Spaniard in Spain"		28 June 1941	—	Published in Time and Tide		
"Spanish Nightmare"		31 July 1937	CEJL I, CW XI, OS	Review of The Spanish Cockpit by Franz Borkenau and Volunteer in Spain by John Sommerfield, published in Time and Tide Vol. XVIII, No. 31 (31 July 1937) pp. 1047–1048.		
"Spanish Prison"		24 December 1944	OY	Published in The Observer		
"Spanish Quintet"		11 December 1937	CEJL I (excerpt), CW XI, OS	Review of Storm Over Spain by Mairin Mitchell, Spanish Rehearsal by Arnold Lunn, Catalonia Infelix by Edgar Allison Peers, Wars of Ideas in Spain by José Castillejo and Invertebrate Spain by José Ortega y Gasset, published in Time and Tide Vol. XVIII, No. 50 (11 December 1937) pp. 1708–1709.		
"The Spanish Tragedy"		16 July 1938	CEJL I (excerpt), CW XI	Review of Searchlight on Spain by the Duchess of Atholl, The Civil War in Spain by Frank Jellinek and Spain's Ordeal by Robert Sencourt, published in Time and Tide Vol. XIX, No. 29 (16 July 1938) pp. 1030–1031.		
"The Spanish War"		December 1939	—	Published in The Adelphi		
Spearhead: Ten Years' Experimental Writing in America edited by James Laughlin		17 April 1948	EL	Book review published in The Times Literary Supplement		
"The Spike"		April 1931	CEJL I, EL, ELp, FUF	Published in The Adelphi, signed "Eric Blair"; revised as chapters 27 and 35 of Down and Out in Paris and London		
"Spilling the Spanish Beans"		29 July and 2 September 1937	CEJL I, CW XI, EL, OS	Article published in two parts in the New English Weekly, Vol. XI, Nos. 16–20 (29 July 1937) pp. 307–308 and Vol. XI, No. 21 (2 September 1937) pp. 328–329.		
The Spirit of Catholicism by Karl Adam, translated by Dom Justin		9 June 1932	CEJL I	Book review published in The New English Weekly		
"The Sporting Spirit"		14 December 1945	CEJL IV, EL, ELp, FUF, OD, SaE,	Published in Tribune		
"Stalinism and Aristocracy"		21 July 1938	CEJL I, CW XI	Review of Searchlight on Spain by the Duchess of Atholl, published the New English Weekly Vol. XIII, No. 15 (21 July 1938) pp. 275–276.		
Stendhal by F. C. Green		July 1939	CEJL I, CWXI	Book review published in The Adelphi		
"Story by Five Authors"		9 October 1942	WB	Short story written by five authors for broadcast over the BBC; Orwell's piece is first, followed by L. A. G. Strong (16 October), Inez Holden (23 October), Martin Armstrong (30 October) and E. M. Forster (6 November).		
"Subject India"		20 November 1943	EL, OP	Review of Subject India by H. N. Brailsford; published in The Nation and Atheneum		
"Such, Such Were the Joys"		1947	CEJL IV, CoE, EL, ELp, FUF, OE, OR, SSWtJ	It is speculated that this piece was completed in 1947, but possible dates range from 1939 through June 1948. Unpublished until 1952, this essay was not printed in the United Kingdom until 1968.		
Such, Such Were the Joys		1953	—	Published by Harcourt, Brace, Jovanovich in New York City in 1953		
"Suggested by a Tooth Paste Advertisement"		c. 1922–1927	CW X	Verse that may have been written when Orwell was in Burma between 1922 and 1927. Only a typewritten version survives, 1f.		
"A Summer Idyll"		1 April 1920	CW X	Short story published unsigned in College Days No. 4, pp. 116, 118, possibly by Orwell		
"Summer-like for an Instant"		1933	—	Poem		
"Survey of 'Civvy Street'"		4 June 1944	OE, OY	Published in The Observer		
The Sword and the Sickle by Mulk Raj Anand		July 1942	CEJL II, EL	Book review published in Horizon		
"A Symposium... Upon Professor John Macmurray's The Clue to History"		February 1939	CW XI, EL, JaA	Review of The Clue of History by John Macmurray, published in The Adelphi		
"Tale of a Head"		19 August 1945	OY	Published in The Observer		
"The Taming of Power"		January 1939	CEJL I, CW XI, EL	Review of Power: A New Social Analysis by Bertrand Russell, published in The Adelphi		
"'Trotskyist' Publications"		5 February 1938	CEJL I, CW XI, OS	Letter to the editor in response to remarks made by Ellen Wilkinson in "France in Crisis" and by the pen-name Sirocco in "Time-Tide Diary", both in Time and Tide (22 January 1938), published in Time and Tide Vol. XIX, No. 6 (5 February 1938) pp. 164–165.		
Talking to India, by E. M. Forster, Richie Calder, Cedric Dover, Hsiao Ch'ien and Others: A Selection of English Language Broadcasts to India		1943	—	Published by Allen & Unwin, edited with an introduction by Orwell		
"Tapping the Wheels"		16 January 1944	OY	Published in The Observer		
"Teller of Tales"		18 November 1945	OY	Published in The Observer		
"Temperature Chart"		25 June 1944	OY	Published in The Observer		
The Tempest by William Shakespeare and The Peaceful Inn by Denis Ogden, Duke of York's		8 June 1940	AAIP	Drama review published in Time and Tide		
"Terror in Spain"		5 February 1938	CEJL I (excerpt), CW XI, OS	Review of The Tree of Gernika by G. L. Steer and Spanish Testament by Arthur Koestler, published in Time and Tide Vol. XIX, No. 6 (5 February 1938) p. 177.		
"That Mysterious Cart"		24 September 1937	CW XI	Reply to statements about the POUM by F.A. Frankfort (Frank Frankford) in The Daily Worker (14 September 1937) and (16 September 1937), published in the New Leader (24 September 1937) p. 3.		
"Theatre"		May 1940	—	Published in Time and Tide from May 1940 to August 1941.		
"Then up Waddled Wog"		c. 1919	CW X	Verse		
"Things We Do Not Want to Know"		29 November 1919	CW X	Published unsigned in College Days No. 3, p. 78, attributed to Orwell with considerable uncertainty		
"Thomas Hardy Looks at War"		18 September 1942	—	Published in Tribune		
"Three Years of Home Guard"		9 May 1943	OY	Published in The Observer		
"Through a Glass, Rosily"		23 November 1945	CEJL IV	Published in Tribune		
"To A. R. H. B."		27 June 1919	CW X	Poem published unsigned in College Days No. 2, p. 42, written by Denys King-Farlow, Orwell attributed as co-author with considerable uncertainty		
"Tobias Smollett: Scotland's Best Novelist"		22 September 1944	CEJL III, EL	Published in Tribune		
"Tolstoy and Shakespeare"		7 May 1941	CEJL II, EL	Initially broadcast over BBC Overseas Service on 7 May 1941, printed in The Listener on 5 June 1941		
Tolstoy: His Life and Work by Derrick Leon		26 March 1944	EL, OY	Book review published in The Observer		
The Totalitarian Enemy by Franz Borkenau		4 May 1940	CEJL II	Book review published in Time and Tide		
"Toward European Unity"		July 1947	CEJL IV, EL	Book review published in Partisan Review, July/August 1947. Also entitled "The Future of Socialism IV: Toward European Unity".		
"Travel Round and Down"		17 October 1936	CEJL I, CW X	Review of Zest of Life by Johann Wöller, translated from the Danish by Claude Napier and I Took Off My Tie by Hugh Massingham, published in Time and Tide		
"Treasure and Travel"		11 July 1936	CW X	Review of Treasure Trek by James Stead, Sun on Summer Seas by Major S. E. G. Ponder and Don Gypsy by Walter Starkie, published in Time and Tide		
Trials in Burma by Maurice Collis		9 March 1938	CEJL I, OP	Review of Trials in Burma by Maurice Collis published unsigned in The Listener (9 March 1938) p. 534.		
"The True Pattern of H. G. Wells"		14 August 1946	LO	Obituary for H. G. Wells published in Manchester Evening News		
"Two Franco Apologists"		24 November 1938	CW XI, OS	Review of The Church in Spain, 1737–1937 by E. Allison Peers and Crusade in Spain by Eoin O'Duffy, published in The New English Weekly		
"Two Glimpses of the Moon"		18 January 1941	—	Published in New Statesman and Nation		
"Uncertain Fate of Displaced Persons"		10 June 1945	OY, R	War report published in The Observer		
"Unemployment in England"		December 1928	—	Published in French in Progrès Civique, between December 1928 and May 1929		
The Unquiet Grave by Palinurus		14 January 1945	CEJL III, EL, OY	Book review published in The Observer		
"Utmost Edge"		27 February 1944	EL, OY	Review of The Edge of the Abyss by Alfred Noyes published in The Observer		
"The Vernon Murders"		c. 1916–1918	CW X	Short story, manuscript, 32 pp.		
"Vessel of Wrath"		21 May 1944	CW XVI, EL, OY	Review of '42 to '44: A Contemporary Memoir Upon Human Behaviour During the Crisis of the World Revolution by H. G. Wells, published in The Observer No. 7982 (21 May 1944), p. 3		
Victory or Vested Interest?		15 May 1942	—	Published by The Labour Book Service, with Orwell's "Culture and Democracy" (made up of the pieces "Fascism and Democracy" and "Patriots and Revolutionaries")		
Voice #1		11 August 1942	WB	The initial issue of Orwell's poetry magazine with readings by Mulk Raj Anand, John Atkins, William Empson, Vida Hope, and Herbert Read.		
Voice #2		8 September 1942	WB	Readings by Edmund Blunden, William Empson, Godfrey Kenton, and Herbert Read.		
Voice #3		6 October 1942	WB	Readings by Mulk Raj Anand, William Empson, Herbert Read, and Stephen Spender.		
Voice #4		3 November 1942	WB	Readings by Venu Chitale, John Atkins, Vida Hope, Edmund Blunden, Godfrey Kenton, Mulk Raj Anand, William Empson, Una Marson, Herbert Read, and Stephen Spender.		
Voice #5		December 1942	—	This issue has not been recovered.		
Voice #6		29 December 1942	WB	Readings by Venu Chitale, William Empson, and Herbert Read.		
"Wall Game"		29 November 1919	CW X	Poem published unsigned in College Days No. 3, p. 78, probably by Orwell		
Walls Have Mouths by W. F. R. Macartney, with Prologue, Epilogue and Comments on the Chapters by Compton Mackenzie		November 1936	EL, OE	Book review published in The Adelphi		
"Wandering Star"		19 December 1943	OY	Published in The Observer		
"War Commentary" #1		20 December 1941	WC	News reporting read by Indian correspondents, written by Orwell and broadcast by the BBC Eastern Service		
"War Commentary" #2		3 January 1942	WC	News reporting read by Indian correspondents, written by Orwell and broadcast by the BBC Eastern Service		
"War Commentary" #3		10 January 1942	WC	News reporting read by Indian correspondents, written by Orwell and broadcast by the BBC Eastern Service		
"War Commentary" #4		17 January 1942	WC	News reporting read by Indian correspondents, written by Orwell and broadcast by the BBC Eastern Service		
"War Commentary" #5		24 January 1942	WC	News reporting read by Indian correspondents, written by Orwell and broadcast by the BBC Eastern Service		
"War Commentary" #6		31 January 1942	WC	News reporting read by Indian correspondents, written by Orwell and broadcast by the BBC Eastern Service		
"War Commentary" #7		7 February 1942	WC	News reporting read by Indian correspondents, written by Orwell and broadcast by the BBC Eastern Service		
"War Commentary" #8		14 February 1942	WC	News reporting read by Indian correspondents, written by Orwell and broadcast by the BBC Eastern Service		
"War Commentary" #9		21 February 1942	WC	News reporting read by Indian correspondents, written by Orwell and broadcast by the BBC Eastern Service		
"War Commentary" #10		28 February 1942	WC	News reporting read by Indian correspondents, written by Orwell and broadcast by the BBC Eastern Service		
"War Commentary" #11		14 March 1942	WC	News reporting read by Indian correspondents, written by Orwell and broadcast by the BBC Eastern Service		
"War Commentary" #12		21 March 1942	WC	News reporting read by Indian correspondents, written by Orwell and broadcast by the BBC Eastern Service		
"War Commentary" #13		28 March 1942	WC	News reporting read by Indian correspondents, written by Orwell and broadcast by the BBC Eastern Service		
"War Commentary" #14		4 April 1942	WC	News reporting read by Indian correspondents, written by Orwell and broadcast by the BBC Eastern Service		
"War Commentary" #15		18 April 1942	WC	News reporting read by Indian correspondents, written by Orwell and broadcast by the BBC Eastern Service		
"War Commentary" #16		25 April 1942	WC	News reporting read by Indian correspondents, written by Orwell and broadcast by the BBC Eastern Service		
"War Commentary" #17		2 May 1942	WC	News reporting read by Indian correspondents, written by Orwell and broadcast by the BBC Eastern Service		
"War Commentary" #18		9 May 1942	WC	News reporting read by Indian correspondents, written by Orwell and broadcast by the BBC Eastern Service		
"War Commentary" #19		16 May 1942	WC	News reporting read by Indian correspondents, written by Orwell and broadcast by the BBC Eastern Service		
"War Commentary" #20		23 May 1942	WC	News reporting read by Indian correspondents, written by Orwell and broadcast by the BBC Eastern Service		
"War Commentary" #21		6 June 1942	WC	News reporting read by Indian correspondents, written by Orwell and broadcast by the BBC Eastern Service		
"War Commentary" #22		13 June 1942	WC	News reporting read by Indian correspondents, written by Orwell and broadcast by the BBC Eastern Service		
"War Commentary" #23		11 July 1942	WC	News reporting read by Indian correspondents, written by Orwell and broadcast by the BBC Eastern Service		
"War Commentary" #24		18 July 1942	WC	News reporting read by Indian correspondents, written by Orwell and broadcast by the BBC Eastern Service		
"War Commentary" #25		25 July 1942	WC	News reporting read by Indian correspondents, written by Orwell and broadcast by the BBC Eastern Service		
"War Commentary" #26		1 August 1942	WC	News reporting read by Indian correspondents, written by Orwell and broadcast by the BBC Eastern Service		
"War Commentary" #27		8 August 1942	WC	News reporting read by Indian correspondents, written by Orwell and broadcast by the BBC Eastern Service		
"War Commentary" #28		15 August 1942	WC	News reporting read by Indian correspondents, written by Orwell and broadcast by the BBC Eastern Service		
"War Commentary" #29		22 August 1942	WC	News reporting read by Indian correspondents, written by Orwell and broadcast by the BBC Eastern Service		
"War Commentary" #30		29 August 1942	WC	News reporting read by Indian correspondents, written by Orwell and broadcast by the BBC Eastern Service		
"War Commentary" #31		5 September 1942	WC	News reporting read by Indian correspondents, written by Orwell and broadcast by the BBC Eastern Service		
"War Commentary" #32		12 September 1942	WC	News reporting read by Indian correspondents, written by Orwell and broadcast by the BBC Eastern Service		
"War Commentary" #33		19 September 1942	WC	News reporting read by Indian correspondents, written by Orwell and broadcast by the BBC Eastern Service		
"War Commentary" #34		26 September 1942	WC	News reporting read by Indian correspondents, written by Orwell and broadcast by the BBC Eastern Service		
"War Commentary" #35		3 October 1942	WC	News reporting read by Indian correspondents, written by Orwell and broadcast by the BBC Eastern Service		
"War Commentary" #36		10 October 1942	WC	News reporting read by Indian correspondents, written by Orwell and broadcast by the BBC Eastern Service		
"War Commentary" #37		17 October 1942	WC	News reporting read by Indian correspondents, written by Orwell and broadcast by the BBC Eastern Service		
"War Commentary" #38		24 October 1942	WC	News reporting read by Indian correspondents, written by Orwell and broadcast by the BBC Eastern Service		
"War Commentary" #39		31 October 1942	WC	News reporting read by Indian correspondents, written by Orwell and broadcast by the BBC Eastern Service		
"War Commentary" #40		7 November 1942	WC	News reporting read by Indian correspondents, written by Orwell and broadcast by the BBC Eastern Service		
"War Commentary" #41		28 November 1942	WC	News reporting read and written by Orwell and broadcast by the BBC Eastern Service		
"War Commentary" #42		12 December 1942	WC	News reporting read and written by Orwell and broadcast by the BBC Eastern Service		
"War Commentary" #43		17 December 1942	WC	News reporting read and written by Orwell and broadcast by the BBC Eastern Service		
"War Commentary" #44		26 December 1942	WC	News reporting read and written by Orwell and broadcast by the BBC Eastern Service		
"War Commentary" #45		9 January 1943	WC	News reporting read and written by Orwell and broadcast by the BBC Eastern Service		
"War Commentary" #46		16 January 1943	WC	News reporting read and written by Orwell and broadcast by the BBC Eastern Service		
"War Commentary" #47		20 February 1943	WC	News reporting read and written by Orwell and broadcast by the BBC Eastern Service		
"War Commentary" #48		27 February 1943	WC	News reporting read and written by Orwell and broadcast by the BBC Eastern Service		
"War Commentary" #49		13 March 1943	WC	News reporting read and written by Orwell and broadcast by the BBC Eastern Service		
"War in Burma"		14 August 1943	—	Published in New Statesman and Nation		
"War-Time Diary" A		28 May 1940	CEJL II	Excerpts of Orwell's diary, 28 May 1940 – 28 August 1941		
"War-Time Diary" B		14 March 1942	CEJL II	Excerpts of Orwell's diary, 14 March – 15 November 1942		
"War-Time Diary" C		1939	FUF	Excerpts of Orwell's diary, 1939–1942		
"Wavell on Hilicon"		12 March 1944	OY	Published in The Observer		
"The Way of a Poet"		17 April 1943	—	Published in Time and Tide		
"We Are Observed!"		2 March 1940	—	Published in Time and Tide		
"Wells, Hitler and The World State"		August 1941	CrE, ColE, CEJL II, EL, ELp, AAIP	Published in Horizon		
"What Is Science?"		26 October 1945	CEJL IV, EL	Published in Tribune		
"Where to Go – But How?"		15 August 1943	OY	Published in The Observer		
"The White Man's Burden"		29 November 1919	CW X	Short story published unsigned in College Days No. 3, pp. 93–95; probably by Orwell; illustrations probably by Robert Paton Longden		
"Who Are the War Criminals?"		22 October 1943	CEJL II	Published in Tribune		
"Why I Join the I.L.P."		24 June 1938	CEJL I, CW XI, EL, OP	Article published in The New Leader (24 June 1938) p. 4. (Note: Reprinted as "Why I Joined the Independent Labour Party" in The Collected Essays, Journalism and Letters of George Orwell, Vol. I.)		
"Why I Write"		June 1946	SSWtJ, EYE, CoE, OR, ColE, DotEM, CEJL I, EL, ELp, FUF, WIW	Published in Gangrel, number four, Summer 1946		
"Wilde's Utopia"		9 May 1948	CEJL IV, EL, OY	Book review of The Soul of Man Under Socialism by Oscar Wilde published in The Observer		
"Will Freedom Die with Capitalism?"		April 1941	—	Published in Left News		
"Will Gypsies Survive?"		December 1938	CW XI, EL, OD	Review of Gypsies by Martin Block translated by Barbara Kuczynski and Duncan Taylor, published in The Adelphi		
"Wishful Thinking and the Light Novel"		19 September 1940	—	Published in New Statesman and Nation		
"Words and Henry Miller"		22 February 1946	CEJL IV, CW XVIII, EL	Review of The Cosmological Eye by Henry Miller, published in Tribune No. 478 (22 February 1946) p. 15. The review was followed by a critical letter to the editor from Herman Schrijver published as "Words and Mr Orwell" (1 March 1946) p. 12 and a reply by Orwell in Tribune No. 481 (15 March 1946) p. 13.		
"World Affairs, 1945"		1945	—	Published in Junior		
"The Wounded Cricketer (Not by Walt Whitman)"		3 June 1918	CW X	Poem published unsigned in The Election Times No. 4, p. 61. Reprinted in College Days No. 5 (9 July 1920) p. 136, also unsigned.		
"The Writer's Dilemma"		22 August 1948	OY	Published in The Observer		
"Writers and Leviathan"		June 1948	SSWtJ, EYE, CW XIX, CEJL IV, EL, ELp, AAIP	Published in Politics and Letters, Summer 1948		
"You and the Atom Bomb"		19 October 1945	CEJL IV, EL	Published in Tribune		
Your Questions Answered		2 December 1943	CEJL I, OE	This BBC Radio series featured public figures answering questions from listeners; Orwell answered "How long is the Wigan Pier and what is the Wigan Pier?"		
"The Youthful Mariner (Extract)"		9 July 1920	CW X	Poem published unsigned in College Days No. 5, pp. 156, 158; "(Extract)" is part of the original title. The last two stanzas possibly first printed as part of The Election Times No. 4		
