= My Country Right or Left =

"My Country Right or Left" is an essay published in 1940 by the English author George Orwell. In it, Orwell seeks to reconcile his intense feeling of patriotism and his left-wing views.

== Background ==
The essay was written after the outbreak of the Second World War at a time when many of Orwell's circle had to reconsider their pacifist views.

Orwell was eleven when the First World War broke out. Some of his recollections quoted in the essay he used in the novel Coming Up for Air published in 1939. Orwell had a traditional English upper-middle-class upbringing and had been a member of an Officer Training Corps at prep school and Eton. In 1937, he spent six months on a quiet part of the front at Huesca during the Spanish Civil War, where, on 20 May, he was shot through the throat by a sniper and nearly died. Orwell had been trying to find war work, but had been unsuccessful, mainly because of his poor health. He subsequently joined the Home Guard, perceiving it as the basis for a people's militia.

The essay was first published in Folios of New Writing in 1940.

== Summary ==
Orwell reflects back to the First World War recalling some of his personal experiences and the specific reactions of himself and his contemporaries at the time. Nevertheless, he felt later that he had missed something by not being involved and attributes this partly to the "moral preparation" for war of the English middle classes. He also attributes a fascination with the Spanish Civil War to its similarity to the Great War.

Orwell's predictions of the Second World War were a nightmare to him, and he wrote pamphlets against war. However, when he saw it as inevitable because of the Molotov–Ribbentrop Pact, he realised he was patriotic at heart and would be dedicated to the war effort. As a Socialist, he saw there was no "alternative between resisting Hitler and surrendering to him" and it was better to resist. He was not subscribing to conservative views because he was still convinced that only revolution could save England. However, he had little regard for "enlightened" left wing intellectuals who failed to understand ordinary emotions. Orwell explains his feelings by showing that the poetry of communist John Cornford was in the same public school tradition as Sir Henry Newbolt's Vitaï Lampada – the political allegiance was different but the emotions were the same.

== Extracts ==
Only revolution can save England, that has been obvious for years, but now the revolution has started, and it may proceed quite quickly if only we can keep Hitler out. Within two years, may be a year, if only we can hang on, we shall see changes that will surprise the idiots who have no foresight. I dare say the London gutters will have to run with blood. All right, let them if it is necessary. But when the red militias are billeted in the Ritz I shall still feel that the England I was taught to love so long ago and for such different reasons is still persisting.

What does that prove? Merely the possibility of building a Socialist on the bones of a Blimp, the power of one kind of loyalty to transmute itself into another, the spiritual need for patriotism and the military values, for which, however little the boiled rabbits of the Left may like them, no substitute has yet been found.

== Reactions ==
According to his notes to his literary executor in 1949, this essay, along with "The Lion and the Unicorn" and "The English People", was a work that Orwell did not wish to be reprinted after his death.

== See also ==
- Bibliography of George Orwell
