= Controversy (disambiguation) =

Controversy is the disagreement and disapproval of or about someone or something. It typically occurs when criticism is prolonged and public.

Controversy may also refer to:

- Controversy (Prince album), a 1981 album by Prince
- "Controversy" (song), a 1981 single by Prince from the album of the same name
- "Controversy (Live in Hawaii)", a 2004 digital single by Prince
- Controversy (Willie D album), a 1989 album by Willie D
- Controversy, an album by Skull Duggery
- Controversy (magazine), British magazine published from 1932 to 1950
- Controversy (law), actual dispute between the parties
