= The English people =

The English people may refer to:

- the English people, a nation and ethnic group native to England
- The English People (essay), an essay by English author George Orwell
