= Mégroz =

Mégroz or Megroz is a surname. Notable people with the surname include:

- Alfred Mégroz (1884–1956), Swiss figure skater
- Naomi Mégroz (born 1998), Swiss footballer
- R. L. Mégroz (1891–1968), English writer, critic, and poet
