= Confessions of a Book Reviewer =

Essay by George Orwell

"Confessions of a Book Reviewer" is a narrative essay published in 1946 by the English author George Orwell. In it, he discusses the lifestyle of a book reviewer and criticises the practice of reviewing almost every book published, which gives rise to this lifestyle.

== Background ==
Orwell started writing book reviews for Adelphi in 1930, and other publications for which he wrote reviews included New English Weekly, Horizon, New Statesman and Tribune. In 1940 he reviewed over 100 books. From 1945 to 1946 Orwell had kept up a high level of work, producing some 130 literary contributions. He had been seriously ill in February and was desperate to get away to Jura.

The essay appeared in Tribune on 3 May 1946.

== Summary ==
Orwell describes the lifestyle of a book reviewer living in a cold stuffy and untidy bedsitter, trying to motivate himself to start reviewing an assorted batch of books, working late into the night, and getting inspiration just in time to meet the copy deadline.

Orwell laments the attitude that every book deserves a review and asserts that in more than nine cases out of ten the book is worthless. The week-in week-out production of snippets reduces the book reviewer to the "crushed figure in a dressing gown". He notes that books on specialist subjects ought to be reviewed by experts, but for practical reasons they end up with the editor's "team of hacks". He would prefer to give very long reviews to the few books of merit and ignore the majority. His consolation is that a book reviewer is better off than a film critic.

== See also ==
- Bibliography of George Orwell
