= London Letters =

Series of articles on WWII and British life by George Orwell

The "London Letters" were a series of fifteen articles written by George Orwell when invasion by Nazi Germany seemed imminent, and published in the American left-wing literary magazine Partisan Review. As well as these "London Letters", PR also published other articles by Orwell.

== Time line ==
On 3 January 1941 Orwell sent the first of his fifteen "London Letters" which were to appear in PR over the next five and a half years. It was included in the March–April 1941 issue.

== A controversy ==
The September–October 1942 issue of PR carried Orwell's reply to letters sent in by D. S. Savage, George Woodcock and Alex Comfort in response to his "London Letter" of the March–April issue, in which he had criticised "left-wing defeatism" and "turn-the-other-cheek" pacifists, stating that they were "objectively pro-Fascist". In his article he had mentioned several people by name, including Comfort, and referred to the review Now, of which Woodcock was editor, as an example of "the overlap between Fascism and pacifism" for publishing contributions by authors who defended these tendencies. In his reply, Orwell reiterated that "Pacifism is objectively pro-Fascist"; defended his work for the BBC's Indian broadcasts and refuted Comfort's accusation that he was "intellectual-hunting again".

== See also ==
- Bibliography of George Orwell
