= Betrayal of the Left =

1941 book edited by Victor Gollancz

Betrayal of the Left: an Examination & Refutation of Communist Policy from October 1939 to January 1941: with Suggestions for an Alternative and an Epilogue on Political Morality
- Title page for Betrayal of the Left: an Examination & Refutation of Communist Policy from October 1939 to January 1941: with Suggestions for an Alternative and an Epilogue on Political Morality (1941)
- Editor: Victor Gollancz
- Author: Left Book Club
- Publication date: 3 March 1941

Betrayal of the Left (full title: Betrayal of the Left: an Examination & Refutation of Communist Policy from October 1939 to January 1941: with Suggestions for an Alternative and an Epilogue on Political Morality) was a book of essays published on 3 March 1941 by the Left Book Club, edited and largely written by Victor Gollancz. The book had a preface by Harold Laski.

Other contributions included two essays by George Orwell, "Fascism and Democracy" and "Patriots and Revolutionaries" that condemned the Communist Party of Great Britain for backing the Molotov–Ribbentrop Pact of 1939 and for taking a revolutionary defeatist position in the war against Nazi Germany. Betrayal of the Left also contained an essay by John Strachey attacking totalitarianism.

It was particularly critical of the Communist Party-organised People's Convention of January 1941, the high point of the party's revolutionary defeatism during the period of Stalin's alliance with Hitler. It marked a decisive break by the democratic left from its 1930s alliance with the Communist Party.

== See also ==
- Bibliography of George Orwell
