= The Politics of Starvation =

"The Politics of Starvation" is an essay published in 1946 by the English author George Orwell. The essay argues the need to help feed Europeans after the war, and attributes motives to left-wingers who oppose the idea.

== Background ==
Rationing in the United Kingdom was introduced at an early stage of World War II, and did not end completely until 1954. It became stricter after the war ended than during the hostilities, with bread rationing beginning in 1946 and potato rationing in 1947. This was largely because of the need to feed the population of European areas coming under British control, whose economies had been devastated by the fighting.

Save Europe Now was an organisation under the aegis of Orwell's publisher Victor Gollancz which was concerned with the relief and reconstruction of Europe after the war.

The essay first appeared in Tribune on 18 January 1946.

== Summary ==
Orwell has received a wad of literature from the "Save Europe Now Committee" arguing that whereas we are reasonably well off, a good part of Europe is lapsing into brute starvation. He contrasts this with a letter in The Guardian by Air Chief Marshal Sir Philip Joubert which states that on his return to Britain he found the children looking pallid and suety compared with the rosy-cheeked youngsters of Denmark and criticises those who would cut present British rations to give more to the Germans.

Orwell quotes extensively from the "Save Europe Now" material on the shortages of food and medicines in places like Austria and Czechoslovakia and Budapest and the breakdown of law and order among children, and reports that the voluntary scheme proposed was discouraged officially. Orwell gives two reasons for the Left being against the scheme. Firstly the working classes would resent it, and secondly food is a political weapon and Russophiles consider that sending food to Eastern Europe is an attempt to undermine the prestige of the Soviet Union. In conclusion Orwell argues that letting Germans go hungry would have the same effect as the punitive reparations after the First World War.

== See also ==
- Bibliography of George Orwell
