= Pleasure Spots =

1946 essay by George Orwell

"Pleasure Spots" is an essay published in 1946 by the English author George Orwell. The essay considers how pleasure resorts are likely to develop in the future, consisting of artificial environments with vacuous pleasures. Orwell argues that people need peace and to be able to appreciate nature.

The essay first appeared in Tribune on 11 January 1946.

== Summary ==
Orwell quotes a journalist who met an entrepreneur planning a "pleasure spot" with a weather-proof roof covering acres of dance halls, bars, skittle alleys and swimming pools and bathed in artificial sunlight. This followed an encounter with a man who lamented that it was a pity no one had found a way in which "a man could relax, rest, play poker, drink and make love all at once and round the clock" and come out of it feeling refreshed.

Orwell notes that Kubla Khan in Samuel Coleridge's poem has got it all wrong in decreeing a pleasure dome containing sacred rivers and measureless caverns. Modern resorts will be very different being artificial environments containing everything a life-hungry man could desire. He points out that the main characteristics of modern civilised man's view of pleasure are already present on a pleasure cruise or in a Lyons Corner House as:

- One is never alone
- One never does anything for oneself
- One is never within sight of wild vegetation or natural objects of any kind
- Light and temperature are always artificially regulated
- One is never out of the sound of music

Orwell argues that tinned music is provided to prevent conversation from becoming serious and to prevent the onset of thought and that the unconscious aim of modern pleasure resorts is a return to the womb. In contrast the notion of admiring nature is bound up with the sense of man's littleness against the power of the universe. When much of what goes by the name of pleasure is an attempt to destroy consciousness, Orwell argues that man equally needs solitude, creative work and wonder and that the highest happiness does not lie in relaxing, resting, playing poker, drinking and making love simultaneously.

== See also ==
- Bibliography of George Orwell
