= Searchlight Books =

Searchlight Books was a series of essays published as hardback books, edited by T. R. Fyvel and George Orwell. The series was published by Secker & Warburg.

The series was projected for 17 titles, of which ten were published during 1941-42, but bomb damage to Warburg's office and the destruction of his printer's paper stock led to the series being discontinued.

The first in the series, The Lion and the Unicorn, was published on 19 February 1941 with an initial run of 5,000 copies, but the number was raised to 7,500. A second printing of 5,000 copies was ordered in March 1941. It sold over 10,000 copies (and was among the most commercially successful of Orwell's books to that date). The destruction of the stock by bombs ended its sales.

Publications by Searchlight Books included the following

- No 1: The Lion and the Unicorn (1941) by George Orwell
- No 2: Offensive Against Germany (1941) by Sebastian Haffner
- No 3: The Lesson of London by Ritchie Calder
- No 4: The English at War (1941) by Cassandra and Philip Zec
- No 5: The End of the Old School Tie by T. C. Worsley - with foreword by George Orwell
- No 7: Above All Things - Liberty by Michael Foot
- No 8: The Artist and the New World by Cyril Connolly
- No 10: Struggle for the Spanish Soul (1941) by Arturo Barea
- No 11: The Case for African Freedom (1941) by Joyce Cary - with foreword by George Orwell
- No 12: Can Britain and America Unite? by G. E. Catlin
- No 13: The Streets of Europe by Arthur Koestler
- No 15: The Moral Blitz: War Propaganda and Christianity by Bernard Causton
- No 16: Beyond the "Isms" by Olaf Stapledon
- No 18: Life and the Poet (1942) by Stephen Spender

Number of publication not known

- Dover Front by Reginald Foster

Included in the initial project but published after the series was cancelled

- Parents' Revolt by Richard and Kathleen Titmuss

== See also ==
- Bibliography of George Orwell
