= Save Europe Now =

1945–49 group in occupied Germany

Save Europe Now was a three year long campaign group founded in 1945 by the left wing publisher Victor Gollancz to improve the conditions for civilians in the British occupation zone in Germany.

It was founded by Gollancz in September 1945, and over the next four years Gollancz wrote another eight pamphlets and books addressing the issue and visited the country several times.

Its executive included the future Labour leader Michael Foot and the MP for Ipswich and prominent war critic Richard Stokes. The group employed the peace campaigner Peggy Duff and the Australian campaigner J. B. Webb was an organiser in Australia.

The work of the group was extensively quoted in George Orwell's The Politics of Starvation.
