= Poetry and the Microphone =

Essay by George Orwell

"Poetry and the Microphone" is an essay by English writer George Orwell. It refers to his work at the BBC’s Eastern Service broadcasting half-hour-long literary programmes to India in the format of an imaginary monthly literary magazine. Written in 1943, it was not published until 1945, in New Saxon Pamphlet. Orwell had by then left the BBC.

Notable for including Orwell’s sentence: "Poetry on the air sounds like the Muses in striped trousers", the article mentions some of the material used in the broadcasts, mainly by contemporary or near-contemporary English writers such as T. S. Eliot, Herbert Read, W. H. Auden, Stephen Spender, Dylan Thomas, Henry Treece, Alex Comfort, Robert Bridges, Edmund Blunden, and D. H. Lawrence. Whenever possible, the authors themselves were invited to read their poems on the air.

Orwell refers to the fact that placing the poet in front of a microphone and having to read his poem out loud has an effect not only on the audience but also on the poet. He states that over the past two hundred years poetry has come to have less connection with music and the spoken word, with lyrical and rhetorical poetry having almost ceased to exist.

The key to broadcasting poetry was to engage the audience – of one – in order to avoid the "atmosphere of frigid embarrassment" of the "grisly" poetry readings which always contained some people who were bored or "all but frankly hostile and who couldn't remove themselves by the simple act of turning a knob". He points out that the unpopularity of poetry contrasts with the "good-bad" poetry, "generally of a patriotic or sentimental kind" and with "folk poetry", as in nursery rhymes, etc.

One number of the programme was on the subject of war and included two poems by Edmund Blunden, Auden’s "September 1941", extracts from "A Letter from Anne Ridler" by G. S. Fraser, Byron's "Isles of Greece", and an extract from T. E. Lawrence's Revolt in the Desert.

The essay goes on to refer to the fact that broadcasting is "under the control of governments or great monopoly companies which are actively interested in maintaining the status quo and therefore preventing the common man from becoming too intelligent".

He gives the example of the British Government which, at the beginning of World War II had declared its "intention of keeping the literary intelligentsia out of it; yet after three years of war almost every writer, however undesirable his political history or opinions, has been sucked into the various Ministries or the BBC" or, if already in the armed forces, into public relations "or some other essentially literary job".

He points out a small consolation in that "the bigger the machine of government becomes, the more loose ends and forgotten corners there are in it" and that as long as they are "forced to maintain an intelligentsia", there will also be a minimum of freedom. Finally, he urges those "who care for literature to turn their minds to this much-despised medium" which has "powers for good".

The Indian Section of the BBC published a collection of the broadcasts, Talking to India (1943), which was edited by Orwell.

== See also ==
- Bibliography of George Orwell
