= John Atkins (writer) =

British writer

John Alfred Atkins (26 May 1916 – 31 March 2009) was a British writer, playwright, poet and novelist.

== Career ==
Born at Carshalton, Surrey, to Frank Periam Atkins, a broker, and Dorothy (née Lovell), Atkins graduated B.A. from the Bristol University in 1938. Subsequently, he worked for Mass Observation and later as Assistant and Literary Editor of the left-wing newspaper Tribune, before his call up for war service arrived in 1943. At Tribune his place was taken by George Orwell.

After the war, he worked as a critic specialising in analysing the work of 20th-century writers. He taught in different parts of the world, including Sudan and Poland, and his erudition and breadth of knowledge was immense. He wrote several books for Calder Publishing and other publishers and for the last thirty years of his life was spent quietly in East Anglia.

He was the author of many literary bibliographies (including Aldous Huxley, George Orwell, J. B. Priestley, Graham Greene, Arthur Koestler and Ernest Hemingway), and of The British Spy Novel, an analysis of the genre, and the multi-volume Sex in Literature series.
