= The Lion and the Unicorn: Socialism and the English Genius =

Essay by George Orwell

"The Lion and the Unicorn: Socialism and the English Genius" is an essay by George Orwell expressing his opinions on the situation in World War II–era Britain. The title alludes to the heraldic supporters appearing in the full royal coat of arms of the United Kingdom.

The essay was first published on 19 February 1941 as the first volume of a series edited by T. R. Fyvel and Orwell, in the Searchlight Books published by Secker & Warburg. Orwell's wife Eileen Blair described the theme of the essay as "how to be a socialist while Tory". It expressed his opinion that the outdated British class system was hampering the war effort and that, to defeat Nazi Germany, Britain needed a socialist revolution. Therefore, Orwell argued that being a socialist and a patriot were no longer antithetical but complementary.

As a result, "The Lion and the Unicorn" became an emblem of the revolution, which would create a new kind of socialism, a democratic "English Socialism" in contrast to the oppressing Soviet Communism, or Stalinism, which he regarded as totalitarian, and also a new form of Britishness, a socialist one liberated from empire and the decadent old ruling classes. Orwell specified that the revolutionary regime might keep on the royal family as a national symbol but would sweep away the rest of the British upper class.

The first part of the essay, "England Your England", is often considered an essay in itself. With the introductory sentence "As I write, highly civilized human beings are flying overhead, trying to kill me", the content sheds some light on the process which eventually led Orwell to the writing of his famous dystopia Nineteen Eighty-Four. The text is also influenced partly by his other experiences in the Spanish Civil War, which he published his memoirs of in "Homage to Catalonia". His beliefs molded there of the dangers of totalitarianism and his conviction for democratic socialism to defeat fascism and Soviet Communism are evident in all of his future novels such as Nineteen Eighty-Four and Animal Farm but are expressed here without allegory.

The second part is entitled "Shopkeepers at War", and the third is "The English Revolution". In 1993, British Prime Minister John Major famously alluded to the essay in a speech on Europe by stating, "Fifty years from now Britain will still be the country of long shadows on county grounds, warm beer, invincible green suburbs, dog lovers and pools fillers and – as George Orwell said – 'old maids bicycling to Holy Communion through the morning mist'."

== See also ==
- Bibliography of George Orwell
