= Henley Standard =

Local newspaper in Henley-on-Thames, Oxfordshire, England

- Type: Weekly newspaper
- Owner: Baylis Media
- Editor: Phil Simms
- Founded: 1885
- Language: English
- Headquarters: Station Road, Henley-on-Thames, Oxfordshire
- Circulation: 4,500
- Website: henleystandard.co.uk

The Henley Standard is a weekly newspaper based in Henley-on-Thames, Oxfordshire, England. It is published by Baylis Media and is one of only a few independently-owned local newspapers in the UK.

The Standard covers Henley town and an area of south Oxfordshire as far as Watlington, Benson and Goring-on-Thames, as well as Caversham and Wargrave in Berkshire and the Hambleden valley in Buckinghamshire. The paper's circulation is about 4,000 copies a week and it claims a readership of about 12,000. The editor is Phil Simms.

The predecessor of the Henley Standard, first published in 1885, was The Henley Free Press. It became the Henley and South Oxfordshire Standard in 1892. Its name was shortened in 1956 to the Henley Standard.

The Henley and South Oxfordshire Standard was the first organ to publish works by the author George Orwell. These were poems that the author, under his real name Eric Blair, wrote aged 10 on the outbreak of the First World War in 1914 and also on the death of Lord Kitchener in 1916.

In 2025, Higgs Group sold the newspaper to Baylis Media.

== Awards ==
In 2019, the Henley Standard was the named the UK's best smaller paid-for weekly of the year in the Society of Editors' Regional Press Awards. It was praised for having "maintained its tradition of solid, in-depth reporting with a variety of news, features, diary items, investigations and campaigns."

In January 2022, Henley Standard editor Simon Bradshaw was awarded the British Empire Medal for services to his patch during the coronavirus pandemic. The paper had continued to publish in print and online during the lockdown, with traffic to its website increasing by 31 per cent. New editorial features included a series of "Lockdown Diaries" contributed by readers.
