= Martin Armstrong (writer) =

English writer

Martin Donisthorpe Armstrong (2 October 1882 – 24 February 1974) was an English writer and poet, known for his stories.

Armstrong was born in Newcastle upon Tyne, and educated at Charterhouse and Pembroke College, Cambridge.

During World War I he volunteered with the British Army and served in France as a Private in the Artists' Rifles. He was commissioned into the 8th Battalion Middlesex Regiment, T.F. in 1915 and promoted to the rank of Lieutenant in 1916. He was included in the final Georgian Poetry anthology.

He married in 1929 Canadian writer Jessie McDonald after she had divorced Conrad Aiken, making Armstrong the stepfather of the young Joan Aiken. He appears in disguised form as a character in Conrad Aiken's Ushant.

== Works ==
- Exodus (1912) poems
- Thirty New Poems (1918)
- Lady Hester Stanhope (1920) biography
- The Buzzards and Other Poems (1921)
- The Poetry of George Meredith (1921)
- The Puppet Show (1922) stories
- Jeremy Taylor, A selection from his works (1923) editor
- The Foster-Mother (n.d.)
- The Bazaar and Other Stories (1924)
- The Goat and Compasses (1925) novel
- Desert, a Legend (1926) novel
- The Stepson (1927) novel [published in the U.S. as The Water is Wide]
- Sir Pompey and Madame Juno (1927) stories
- Saint Hercules and Other Stories (1927), Paul Nash illustrator
- St. Christopher's Day (1928) novel
- Portrait of the Misses Harlowe (1928) story
- The Three-Cornered Hat (1928) translation
- Laughing (1928) essay
- The Sleeping Fury (1929) novel
- The Bird-catcher and other poems (1929)
- The Fiery Dive and Other Stories (1929)
- Adrian Glynde, A Novel (1930)
- Collected Poems (1931)
- Blind Man's Mark (1931)
- The Paintbox, "How and Why" Series (1931)
- The Romantic Adventures of Mr. Darby and of Sarah his Wife (1931) novel
- The Fothergill Omnibus (1931) anthology
- Lover's Leap (1932)
- Fifty-four Conceits: A Collection of Epigrams and Epitaphs Serious and Comic (1933)
- General Buntop's Miracle and Other Stories (1934)
- The Major Pleasures of Life (1934) an Anthology selected and arranged by Armstrong
- Venus Over Lannery (1936) novel
- A Case of Conscience and Other Tales (1937)
- Spanish Circus: Charles IV of Spain (1937)
- The Snake in the Grass (1938) novel
- Victorian Peepshow (1938) autobiography
- Simplicity Jones and Other Stories (1940)
- Chichester Concert (1944) ode
- George Borrow (1950)
- Selected Stories (1951)
- The Crumb for the Bird (1970)
