= Now (1940–1947 magazine) =

1940s political and literary periodical

NOW was a British political and literary magazine which George Woodcock founded in April 1940, while he was living in his mother's house in Marlow, Buckinghamshire and working in a variety of posts in the headquarters of the Great Western Railway at Paddington Station, London.

Woodcock was prompted to start Now because of the closure of Horizon, which he rejected as being 'too much of a mandarin journal to continue the avant garde role of such little mags of the late 1930s as Twentieth Century Verse and Contemporary Poetry and Prose. Consequently, faced with a 'sudden silencing of voices', he decided to start a magazine 'for young and disaffected writers'.

The first issue appeared, in the spring of 1940, 'as a cyclo-styled sheet', for which Woodcock received financial help from a group of local pacifists. In his Introduction to Now, he wrote that Now 'would seek to "perpetrate good writing and clear thought.' He later elaborated: 'Now was established early in the war as a review for publishing literary matter and also as a forum for controversial writing which could not readily find publications under wartime conditions, and stated that its writers 'included Anarchists, Stalinists, Trotskyists, pacifists, and New Statesman moderates.'

Two further issues were produced, which were printed, by the autumn of 1940. In March 1941, Now was 'restarted on a more ambitious scale, with a wider range of contributors' Woodcock recalled:

'Four numbers appeared. By the last, No. 7, I had come to realise the justice of a criticism made by Julian Symons, in which he attacked the "free expression" policy, which had united in one so many incompatible opinions, and contended that a small magazine was only justified if it represented a defined attitude.'

The first seven issues of Now came to be called the 'Old Series'. The magazine wasn't published in 1942 because of what George Fetherling called, in his biography of Woodcock, 'the turmoil in Woodcock's personal and political lives'. Consequently, Woodcock launched the next series in 1943. It was published by Freedom Press and comprised nine volumes, the last one of which was dated July–August 1947. Among the many articles that were published in Now, Volume 5 included "Sexuality and Freedom", by Marie-Louise Berneri, the Italian anarchist, which was one of the first discussions of the ideas of Wilhelm Reich in Britain.

== The 1942 criticism of Orwell ==
In his London Letter which was published in the March–April 1942 issue of Partisan Review, George Orwell described NOW as 'a little anti-war paper' and cited it as an example of publications that published contributions by both pacificts and Fascists. Woodcock replied to Orwell by stating that 'the review had abandoned its position as an independent forum, and has now become the cultural review of the British Anarchist movement.'

A week or so afterwards, Orwell invited Woodcock to participate in one of his BBC broadcasts to India. Woodcock accepted his invitation. Then they met again by chance, when Orwell remarked to him that there was no reason to let an 'argument on paper breed personal ill feeling'. Orwell struck Woodcock as wanting to be friendly. Neither of them mentioned their disagreement again. And they became friends. In 1946 Now published Orwell's celebrated article How the Poor Die.

== The contributors ==
Anarchist historian David Goodway noted that the contributors of Now included 'Orwell ("How the poor die"), Lawrence Durrell (the superb "Elegy on the Closing of the French Brothels"), George Barker, W.S. Graham, Julian Symons, the undervalued painter Jankel Adler (an anarchist exile from Poland), Henry Miller, e.e. cummings, Paul Goodman, Kenneth Rexroth, Dwight Macdonald, Andrẻ Breton and Victor Serge, as well as Read, Comfort, Savage, Hewetson and M.L. Berneri.' Other contributors included Mulk Raj Anand, Duke of Bedford, Marvin Barrett, Roy Campbell, Rhys Davies, Hugh I'Anson Fausset, Roy Fuller, James Hanley, Julian Huxley, Mervyn Peake, Keidrych Rhys, F.A. Ridley, Rainer Marie Rilke (a reprint)., Francis Scarfe, Theodore Spencer, Ruthven Todd, Wilfred Wellock and Hugh Ross Williamson.

== The closure of Now ==
Two explanations have been proposed about why Now closed. Julian Symons wrote that it ended 'when the emotional and practical burdens of running it became too great.' In contrast George Fetherling proposed that Woodcock 'let it die' because of three reasons: its circulation 'began to recede', the belief that George Orwell conveyed to Woodcock that its 'time had passed', with which Herbert Read 'was more or less in agreement', and because Woodcock was trying to complete his transformation from 'poet-pamphleteer to serious literary historian, biographer and critic.'

Two widely-separated tributes have been paid to NOW. In 1981 Julian Symons wrote: 'Looking back on the issues that appeared between 1944 and 1947, it seems to me much the best periodical of a radical kind in England during those years.' In 2012 David Goodway described it as being 'one of the very best little magazines of the 1940s'.

== Archive - The second series ==
- 1943 Volume 1
- 1943 Volume 2
- 1943 Volume 3
- 1943 Volume 4
- 1943 Volume 5
- 1943 Volume 6
- 1943 Volume 7
- 1943 Volume 8
- 1943 Volume 9
