= The New English Weekly =

The New English Weekly was a British review of "Public Affairs, Literature and the Arts."

It was founded in April 1932 by Alfred Richard Orage shortly after his return from Paris. One of Britain's most prestigious editors, Orage had edited the magazine The New Age from 1907 to 1922.

The May 16, 1932, issue of TIME announced the launch of the publication, mentioning that it was represented in the U.S. by Gorham Munson. Other contributors included Hilaire Belloc; Grand Duchess Marie of Russia; Will Dyson, former cartoonist of the Labour Party's Daily Herald. Paul Banks reviewed drama, David Gascoyne art, Storm Jameson novels, and Kaikhosru Shapurji Sorabji music.

On Orage's sudden death in 1934, the publication's literary editor, Philip Mairet, took over the editor's chair.

George Orwell had contributed a review to the 9 June 1932 issue, and between August 1935 and April 1940, wrote regular book reviews and articles for the publication.

In the "Easter Number" for 1940, the review published for the first time the long poem "East Coker" by T. S. Eliot. His '"The Dry Salvages" was first published in the review in 1941, and Little Gidding appeared in the publication in 1942, also a first publication.

The paper was a leading supporter of the Social Credit Party, as well as advocating organic farming, among other issues.
