= R. L. Mégroz =

Rodolphe Louis Mégroz (2 August 1891 – 30 September 1968) was a prolific English writer, critic and poet. He was born in London, with a French father and English mother. He worked in a bank before World War I, in which he served in the British Army at Gallipoli.

After the war Mégroz trained as a journalist, and worked as a freelance. He also wrote numerous books, and stories. During World War II he worked for the BBC.

== Works ==
- Personal Poems (1919)
- A talk with Joseph Conrad and a criticism of his mind and method (1926)
- The Three Sitwells; a biographical and critical study (1927)
- Francis Thompson: The Poet of Earth in Heaven. A Study in Poetic Mysticism and the Evolution of Love-Poetry (1927) (Faber & Gwyer)
- Ronald Ross, discoverer and creator (1931)
- Rhys Davies. A Critical Sketch (1932)
- The Lear Omnibus (1938)
- The Real Robinson Crusoe (1939)
- Dante Gabriel Rossetti, painter poet of heaven in earth
- Profile Art Through the Ages: A Study of the Use and significance of Profile and Silhouette from the Stone Age to Puppet Films
- Shakespeare as a Letter Writer and Artist in Prose
- Walter de la Mare: A Biography and Critical Study (1972)
