= Controversy (magazine) =

Frontpage of Controversy, July 1938

Controversy: The Monthly Socialist Forum was a British monthly magazine published by the Independent Labour Party from 1932 to 1950. The magazine originated as the internal bulletin of the party, but from 1936 onwards it branched out to reach a wider left-leaning readership. In 1939 the magazine changed its name to Left Forum and then to Left.

The magazine published contributions not only from members of the Independent Labour Party, but also from members of the Communist Party and the Labour Party, as well as individuals who belonged to no political party. Among its international contributors were Franz Borkenau, Max Eastman, Paul Frölich, Julián Gorkin, Sidney Hook, Jomo Kenyatta, Jay Lovestone, George Padmore, Marceau Pivert, Victor Serge, August Thalheimer, Tom Wintringham, Bernard Wolfe and Simone Weil.

The first editor of Controversy was the school teacher, and later Independent Labour Party chairman, C. A. Smith. According to historian Raymond Challinor, Smith played a pivotal role in turning Controversy into a publication where "the many diverse views held within the working-class movement could be openly discussed without rancour." After Smith the magazine was edited by Jon Evans together with George Padmore and then later by R. E. Fitzgerald.
