= The English People (essay) =

1947 essay by George Orwell

The English People is an essay by English author George Orwell, first published in August 1947. It was commissioned in September 1943 by W. J. Turner, Collins's general editor, for the series Britain in Pictures. The idea for the series came from the Ministry of Information. It was published with twenty-five illustrations, eight of which were full-page colour plates, and included work by artists Edward Ardizzone, Dame Laura Knight, L. S. Lowry, Henry Moore, John Minton, and Feliks Topolski. Written during World War II, it presents Orwell's vision of what it meant to be "English".

Orwell did not think highly of his own work. He described it as "silly" and "propaganda", and refused to allow it to be reprinted.

A dissenting opinion is that Orwell often tended to disparage his works, regardless of critical praise.
