= Coming Up for Air =

1939 novel by George Orwell

- First edition cover
- Author: George Orwell
- Genre: Satire
- Published: 12 June 1939 (Victor Gollancz)
- Publication place: United Kingdom
- Pages: 237 (UK hardcover edition)
- Preceded by: Homage to Catalonia
- Followed by: Inside the Whale and Other Essays

Coming Up for Air is the seventh book and fourth novel by the English writer George Orwell, published in June 1939 by Victor Gollancz. It was written between 1938 and 1939 while Orwell spent time recuperating from illness in French Morocco, mainly in Marrakesh. He delivered the completed manuscript to Victor Gollancz upon his return to London in March 1939.

The story follows George Bowling, a 45-year-old husband, father, and insurance salesman, who foresees World War II and attempts to recapture idyllic childhood innocence and escape his dreary life by returning to Lower Binfield, his birthplace. The novel is comical and pessimistic, with its views that speculative builders, commercialism, and capitalism are killing the best of rural England, and that his country is facing the sinister appearance of new, external national threats.

== Background ==
As a child, Orwell lived at Shiplake and Henley in the Thames Valley. His father, Richard Walmesley Blair, was a civil servant in British India, and he lived a genteel life with his mother and two sisters, though spending much of the year at boarding school at Eastbourne and later at Eton in Britain. He particularly enjoyed fishing and shooting rabbits with a neighbouring family.

In 1937 Orwell spent some months fighting in the Spanish Civil War. He was wounded in the throat in May 1937, by a Nationalist sniper at Huesca.

Orwell was severely ill in 1938 and was advised to spend the winter in a warm climate. The novelist L. H. Myers anonymously gave £300 to enable this and Orwell went with his wife to North Africa where he stayed in French Morocco, mainly in Marrakesh, from September 1938 to March 1939. (Orwell never learned the source of the money and he accepted it only on condition that it be considered a loan. He repaid the loan, eight years later, when he began making money from the success of Animal Farm.) Orwell wrote Coming Up for Air while he was in North Africa and left the manuscript at his agent's office within a few hours of arriving back in England on 30 March 1939.

It was submitted to Victor Gollancz, who had an option on Orwell's next three novels, in spite of the 'cold treatment which [Orwell] had been given when Homage to Catalonia was rejected.' In fact Orwell heard in April 1939 that Gollancz had reservations about the book, and was delaying a decision to accept it. The descriptions in the novel of a character who lectures at a meeting of Gollancz's Left Book Club, and of the meeting itself, were such that Gollancz 'could not have helped being offended by them.' Nevertheless, the publisher did bring out the novel without demanding major changes and it was published on 12 June 1939. It was the last Orwell novel to bear the Gollancz imprint.

== Plot summary ==
The book's themes are nostalgia, the folly of trying to go back and recapture past glories, and the easy way the dreams and aspirations of one's youth can be smothered by the humdrum routine of work, marriage, and getting old. It is written in the first person, with George Bowling, the 45-year-old protagonist, who reveals his life and experiences while undertaking a trip back to his boyhood home as an adult.

At the book's opening, Bowling has a day off work to go to London to collect a new set of false teeth. A news poster about the contemporary King Zog of Albania sets off thoughts of a biblical character Og, King of Bashan, whom he recalls from Sunday church as a child. Along with 'some sound in the traffic or the smell of horse dung or something', these thoughts trigger Bowling's memory of his childhood as the son of an unambitious seed merchant in "Lower Binfield" near the River Thames. Bowling relates his life history, dwelling on how a lucky break during the First World War landed him a comfortable job away from any action and provided contacts that helped him become a successful salesman.

Bowling is wondering what to do with a modest sum of money that he has won on a horserace and which he has concealed from his wife and family. Much later (part III), he and his wife attend a Left Book Club meeting where he is horrified by the hate shown by the anti-fascist speaker and bemused by the Marxist ramblings of the communists who have participated in the meeting. Fed up with this, he seeks his friend Old Porteous, the retired schoolmaster. He usually enjoys Porteous' company, but on this occasion, his dry, dead classics make Bowling even more depressed.

Bowling decides to use the money on a 'trip down memory lane' to revisit the places of his childhood. He recalls a pond with giant fish, which he had missed the chance to try and catch thirty years previously. He, therefore, plans to return to Lower Binfield, but when he arrives, he finds the place unrecognizable. Eventually, he locates the old pub where he is to stay, finding it much changed. His home has become a tea shop. Only the church and vicar appear the same, but he is shocked when he discovers an old girlfriend, for she has been so ravaged by time that she is almost unrecognizable and utterly devoid of the qualities he once had adored. She fails to recognize him at all. Bowling remembers the slow and painful decline of his father's seed business – resulting from the nearby establishment of corporate competition.

This painful memory seems to have sensitized him to – and given him a repugnance for – what he sees as the marching ravages of "Progress". The final disappointment is that the estate where he used to fish has been built over, and the secluded and once-hidden pond that contained the huge carp he constantly intended to take on with his fishing rod but never got around to has become a rubbish dump. The social and material changes experienced by Bowling since childhood make his past seem distant. The concept of "you can't go home again" hangs heavily over Bowling's journey as he realizes that many of his old haunts are gone or considerably changed from his younger years.

Throughout the adventure, he receives reminders of impending war, and the threat of bombs becomes real when one lands accidentally on the town.

== Characters ==
- George Bowling is a fat, married, middle-aged (45 years old) insurance salesman, with 'two kids and a house in the suburbs'.

Orwell's brother-in-law, Humphry Dakin, the husband of Orwell's elder sister Marjorie, a 'short, stout, loquacious' man, thought that Bowling might be a portrait of him. He had known Blair (Orwell) since they were youngsters, when the Blairs lived at Henley-on-Thames and later when they lived at Southwold where he married Marjorie.

- Joe Bowling is George's elder brother. He was not intellectual, and, according to George 'therefore he had a slight proficiency in mechanics'. He never did any sizeable amount of work and worked for his dad as an 'errand boy'. One day when George was younger, Joe stole all the money from the shop till. He was said to have always wanted to emigrate to America, and was never mentioned again.
- Uncle Ezekiel is a shop owner with quite liberal beliefs, being a 'little Englander'. He kept an assortment of caged birds inside his shop as decoration.
- Hilda Bowling, his wife, belongs to the poverty-stricken officer class of an Anglo-Indian family who after marriage has settled-down into a depressed lifeless middle-aged frump. She is 39 years old, 'very thin and rather wizened, with a perpetual brooding, worried look in her eyes.'
- Old Porteous, a retired public-schoolmaster whose whole life has been lived in an atmosphere of Latin, Greek, and cricket.
- Elsie, George's ex-partner; they met in the vicar's reading circle, and she was said to be 'deeply feminine'. They stayed together 'living in sin' until George enlisted. Shortly afterwards he loses contact with her. Upon his 1939 return to Lower Binfield, George sees her and remarks that 'the milky white skin was gone...' and that she was now a cylinder with lumps sticking out'. She also now speaks with a strong cockney accent and has married a shop owner, also named George.

== Style ==
In their 1972 study of Orwell, The Unknown Orwell, the writers Peter Stansky and William Abrahams described the novel as Wellsian. Whilst at his prep school in Sussex (1911–1916), Wells had been a favourite author of Eric Blair/Orwell. As with other writers he had read while at St Cyprian's Prep school, – Kipling, Wodehouse, Swift, Shaw, Thackeray – his loyalty was virtually unwavering. What he valued in Wells was not the later polemicist, but the novelist whose evocation of certain aspects of life in England before World War I recalled to Orwell comparable experiences of his own.

He and Connolly would leave the school grounds and set out across the Downs to Beachy Head, or "far along the plunging leafy roads that led deep into the Sussex countryside, to villages that might have figured in a Wells novel: Eastdean and Westdean and Jevington. They would pause in each, and buy penny sweets and various fizzy drinks. This was the plain, decent, bread-and-sunlit world that Orwell recalled so nostalgically the further it retreated from him; eventually he would write [a] Wellsian [novel of this kind], in Coming Up For Air."

The writer Michael Levenson remarked upon the influence at this period in Orwell's life, of Henry Miller, and Miller's attitude to what was happening in the world. Miller sees what is happening, but is Inside the Whale, he "feels no impulse to alter or control the process that he is undergoing. He has performed the essential Jonah act of allowing himself to be swallowed, remaining passive, accepting – even when this means accepting "concentration camps, rubber truncheons, Hitler, Stalin, bombs, aeroplanes." "George Bowling is Orwell's Jonah, and Coming Up For Air is in significant respects a contribution to the 'school of Miller'. Hemmed in on every side ̶ by job, home, history – Bowling neither comprehends the political world nor tries to change it. He merely wants to rediscover the grounds of happiness.

In its central movement, Coming Up For Air is an unembarrassedly affirmative recovery of early-century innocence: boyhood, family life and country rambling in the town of Lower Binfield. Fishing in Coming Up For Air is what sex was in Tropic of Cancer. 'Fishing', as Bowling puts it, 'is the opposite of war'.

== Critical responses ==
The novel sold three thousand copies, a thousand of which represented a second printing and thus bettered "the dismal response in the bookshops which had met the publication of Homage to Catalonia." The reviews were among the best that Orwell had received for a novel. Margery Allingham, in Time and Tide, wrote that her only regret "is that the story was written in the first person. This device, although it has the important virtue of making the narrative clear and easy to read, tends to falsify the character slightly since [Bowling's] uncanny perception where his own feelings are concerned makes him a little less of the ordinary mortal which his behaviour would show him to be."

A recent biographer, Michael Shelden, praised the "many passages of lyrical beauty, not unbecoming a novelist who once aspired to be a poet. The one serious defect in the novel is Orwell's attempt to be the voice of his narrator-protagonist. He does not make a convincing middle-aged, overweight, suburban-dwelling, low-brow insurance salesman, and the book is at its best when Orwell is 'out-of-character', speaking in a voice which is recognisably his rather than an imitation of 'Fatty' Bowling's."

The writers Peter Stansky and William Abrahams, in their 1972 The Unknown Orwell, noted: "Eric Blair looked back unforgivingly on the world before 1914 – it was that world that had sent him to his prep school – while George Orwell could believe it was superior to what came after it, and looked back to it nostalgically in Coming Up for Air." The writer John Wain thought the book was "not a success in novelistic terms", but saw "vitality in its hinterland." He considered the novel "a bleaker work than Keep the Aspidistra Flying; in Aspidistra everybody fears the sack, hankers for more money and security, cringes to the boss. But only to the boss at work, the economic boss. When Bowling thinks of the future, he fears not only the ever-present financial insecurity, the endless work, work, work with the gutter only a few steps away; he fears also the new breed of tyrants, the leader and his strong-arm boys."

And Wain noted the third region of Bowling's nightmare – "what we have since learnt to call 'the environment'." He places Coming Up For Air alongside Orwell's 1946 essay Some Thoughts on the Common Toad where he had written that, "retaining one's childhood love of such things as trees, fishes, butterflies and – toads, one makes a peaceful and decent future a little more probable". "What makes Coming Up For Air so peculiarly bitter to the taste is that, in addition to calling up the twin spectres of totalitarianism and workless poverty, it also declares the impossibility of 'retaining one's childhood love of such things as trees, fishes, butterflies' – because it postulates a world in which these things are simply not there any more."

== See also ==
- Bibliography of George Orwell
