= Inside the Whale and Other Essays =

1940 book by George Orwell

Inside the Whale
- First edition
- Author: George Orwell
- Language: English
- Publisher: Victor Gollancz Ltd.
- Publication date: 11 March 1940
- Publication place: United Kingdom
- Pages: 188
- Preceded by: Coming Up for Air
- Followed by: Animal Farm

Inside the Whale and Other Essays is a book of essays written by George Orwell in 1940. It includes the eponymous essay "Inside the Whale".

== Background ==
Inside the Whale was published by Victor Gollancz as a book of essays on 11 March 1940. Orwell refers to it as a "book" in part three of the essay. ("While I have been writing this book another European war has broken out."), as well as in letters he wrote to Geoffrey Gorer and Humphry House, an English scholar, the following month. Gollancz initially printed 1,100 copies in March 1940, with some copies destroyed by Nazi bombing of England.

== Contents ==
- "Inside the Whale" (1939)
- "Charles Dickens" (1940)
- "Boys' Weeklies" (1940)

== Later version ==
A collection of essays with the same title was published in 1962 in the UK by Penguin Books. This edition was a reprint of an earlier collection entitled Selected Essays published in 1957. The collection contains the following essays:

- "Inside the Whale"
- "Down the Mine" (a passage from The Road to Wigan Pier)
- "England Your England"
- "Shooting an Elephant"
- "Lear, Tolstoy and the Fool"
- "Politics vs. Literature: An Examination of Gulliver's Travels"
- "Politics and the English Language"
- "The Prevention of Literature"
- "Boys' Weeklies"

The back cover of the 1962 edition notes that the front cover is a photograph of a selection of books from George Orwell's personal library. These are

- For the Time Being by W. H Auden
- Enemies of Promise by Cyril Connolly
- Stalky & Co. by Rudyard Kipling
- Tarr by Wyndham Lewis
- Tropic of Capricorn by Henry Miller
- Last Poems by A. E. Housman
- Leaves of Grass by Walt Whitman
- Ulysses by James Joyce

kept upright by a black elephant bookend.

== See also ==
- Bibliography of George Orwell
