= Notes on Nationalism =

1945 essay by George Orwell

'Notes on Nationalism' is an essay completed in May 1945 by George Orwell and published in the first issue of the British magazine Polemic in October 1945. Political theorist Gregory Claeys has described it as a key source for understanding Orwell's novel Nineteen Eighty-Four.

In the essay, Orwell uses the term nationalism to pick out a tendency to think in terms of 'competitive prestige' and argues that it causes people to disregard common sense and become more ignorant towards facts. He specifies that this is not a standard use of the term 'nationalism', but is instead a placeholder for a term that would better characterise this unreflective partisanship. The essay was soon translated into French and Dutch, Italian and Finnish. (Note: (in which the word nationalism was represented by chauvinism)) The article was abridged in the translated versions by omitting details of particular relevance to British readers. A short introduction, based on material supplied by Orwell, preceded the translated abridgements.

== Content ==
The essay was written during the final stages of World War II while Europe had just witnessed the destructive effects of political movements. Nazism is used as an example of how nationalism can cause havoc between groups of people and can instigate ignorance within those groups. Orwell compares Nazism with other forms of nationalistic ideologies to generate an overall argument and questions the function of nationalism.

Nationalism is the name that Orwell gives to the propensity of "identifying oneself with a single nation or other unit, placing it beyond good and evil and recognising no other duty than that of advancing its interests". Its occurrence is visible throughout history, and it is prevalent. Nationalism is defined as alignment to a political entity but can also encompass a religion, race, ideology or any other abstract idea. Examples of such forms of nationalism given by Orwell include Communism, political Catholicism, Zionism, anti-Semitism, Trotskyism and pacifism.

Orwell additionally argues that his definition of "nationalism" is not equal to the notion, held by himself and most other people, of "patriotism": "Patriotism is of its nature defensive.... Nationalism, on the other hand, is inseparable from the desire for power." Orwell explains that he uses the expression "nationalism" for lack of a better alternative to label the concept that he describes in his essay.

Orwell argues that nationalism largely influences the thoughts and actions of people, even in such everyday tasks as decision-making and reasoning. The example provided is of asking the question: "Which of the three great allies, the U.S.S.R., Britain and the U.S.A., has contributed most to the defeat of Germany?". People aligned with the United States, Britain and the Soviet Union would consider their country first before they attempt to search for supportive arguments.

One of the themes that Orwell discusses is the effect of nationalistic sentiment on human thinking. Nationalism causes dishonesty within people because, he argues, every nationalist, having chosen one side, persuades himself that his side is the strongest, regardless of the arguments against the faction. From that sense of superiority, people then argue for and defend their faction. The slightest slur or criticism from another faction causes them to retort or be violent since they realise they are serving a larger entity, which provides them with that sense of security and so they must defend it.

Additionally, they may become ignorant to the point of self-deception:

The nationalist not only does not disapprove of atrocities committed by his own side, but he has a remarkable capacity for not even hearing about them. For quite six years the English admirers of Hitler contrived not to learn of the existence of Dachau and Buchenwald. And those who are loudest in denouncing the German concentration camps are often quite unaware, or only very dimly aware, that there are also concentration camps in Russia. Huge events like the Ukraine famine of 1933, involving the deaths of millions of people, have actually escaped the attention of the majority of English russophiles.

— Orwell 1945, paragraph 13

Such people become susceptible to bias by acknowledging only information that they judge as true, as emotions hinder them in properly addressing facts. People believe in what they approve in their own minds as true to the point that they deem it as an absolute truth: "More probably they feel that their own version was what happened in the sight of God, and that one is justified in rearranging the records accordingly".

Orwell also criticises the silliness and the dishonesty of intellectuals who become more nationalistic on behalf of another country for which they have no real knowledge, rather than their native country. Orwell argues that much of the romanticism, written about leaders such as Stalin, for example, and describe their might, power and integrity, was written by intellectuals. An intellectual is influenced by a certain public opinion, "that is, the section of public opinion of which he as an intellectual is aware". He is surrounded by scepticism and disaffection, which is not very compatible with a very deep attachment to his own country: "He still feels the need for a Fatherland, and it is natural to look for one somewhere abroad. Having found it, he can wallow unrestrainedly in exactly those emotions from which he believes that he has emancipated himself".

Also, Orwell provides three characteristics to describe those who follow nationalistic sentiment: obsession, instability and indifference to reality.

Obsession refers to how nationalists passionately tender to their faction: "As nearly as possible, no nationalist ever thinks, talks, or writes about anything except the superiority of his own power unit. It is difficult if not impossible for any nationalist to conceal his allegiance.... he will generally claim superiority for it (if the chosen unit of allegiance is a country) not only in military power and political virtue, but in art, literature, sport, structure of the language, the physical beauty of the inhabitants, and perhaps even in climate, scenery and cooking. He will show great sensitiveness about such things as the correct display of flags, relative size of headlines and the order in which different countries are named".

"Some nationalists are not far from schizophrenia, living quite happily amid dreams of power and conquest which have no connexion with the physical world". Orwell argues that uncertainty over the disasters reported ("What were the rights and wrongs of the Warsaw rising of 1944? Is it true about the German gas ovens in Poland?") makes it "easier to cling to lunatic beliefs.... Since nothing is ever quite proved or disproved, the most unmistakeable fact can be impudently denied.... The nationalist is often somewhat uninterested in what happens in the real world".

Regarding instability, Orwell reasons that nationalism can become ironical in various ways. Many of the leaders revered by nationalist factions are outright foreigners, who do not even belong to the country that they have glorified. More often, they are "from peripheral areas where nationality is doubtful". For instance, Stalin was a Georgian, and Hitler was an Austrian, but both were respectively idolised in Russia and Germany.

Indifference to reality refers to "the power of not seeing resemblances between similar sets of facts" and is a feature of all nationalists, according to Orwell. He describes how nationalism clouds people from perceiving facts of the real world. The use of torture, hostages, forced labour, mass deportations, imprisonment without trial, forgery, assassination, the bombing of civilians all prove to be irrelevant towards the notion of "good or bad", and there is no outrage from within the public, as the atrocities are committed by "our side". Some nationalists even go into the trouble of defending such actions and search for arguments to support their case.

Orwell provides the example of the liberal News Chronicle publishing images of Russians hanged by the Germans to depict the shocking barbarity of the Germans and then, a few years later, publishing with warm approval very-similar photographs of Germans hanged by the Russians. Another similar instance is another newspaper publishing, with seeming approval, photographs of the baiting by a mob in Paris of scantily-clad women, who collaborated with the Nazis. The photographs strongly resembled the Nazi images of Jews being baited by the Berlin mob in the years before the war.

=== Classification of nationalisms ===
Having set out the mental habits common to all nationalism, Orwell attempts to classify its forms, while cautioning that the subject is too large to treat comprehensively and that he is concerned specifically with nationalism as it appears among the English intelligentsia. He groups the varieties under three headings—Positive, Transferred and Negative. Noting that some fit more than one category and that several kinds can co-exist in the same person.

Under positive nationalism Orwell places neo-Toryism, which he characterises as a refusal to accept the decline of British power; Celtic nationalism (Welsh, Irish and Scottish), which he describes as anti-English in orientation and tinged with racialism; and Zionism, which he classes as direct rather than transferred because, in his account, it flourished chiefly among Jews themselves.

Under transferred nationalism—loyalty directed at a foreign or external unit he lists Communism (which he calls the dominant form among the intelligentsia, treating the U.S.S.R. as a fatherland); political Catholicism, exemplified for him by G. K. Chesterton; "colour feeling", which he claimed appeared among intellectuals in a transposed form as a belief in the superiority of non-white peoples; class feeling, similarly transposed into a belief in the superiority of the proletariat; and pacifism, a minority strand whose underlying motive Orwell characterised as hostility to Western democracy.

Under negative nationalism he places anglophobia, antisemitism (which he argued was more widespread among intellectuals than openly admitted) and Trotskyism, which he defines as a doctrinaire Marxism whose principal motive is hostility to the Stalin regime.

== Misquotation ==
A statement sometimes incorrectly attributed to Orwell is "There are some ideas so absurd that only an intellectual could believe them." Orwell expressed a similar, but not identical, idea in "Notes on Nationalism", writing, "I have heard it confidently stated, for instance, that the American troops had been brought to Europe not to fight the Germans but to crush an English revolution. One has to belong to the intelligentsia to believe things like that: no ordinary man could be such a fool."

== Critical reception ==
Sociologist Krishan Kumar cites Orwell's "Notes on Nationalism" as an example of how English writers often argue that nationalistic sentiment is an unfamiliar phenomenon in English society. Kumar notes that Orwell sees nationalism (in the special sense that Orwell uses the term), as an "all-consuming sickness of the individual". Kumar adds that Orwell sees this sentiment as something associated with Continental Europe and largely alien to the English political tradition. In his book Absent Minds: Intellectuals in Britain, historian Stefan Collini analyses "Notes on Nationalism" as an example of Orwell's views on intellectuals. Collini argued that Orwell's way of evaluating social conditions left him unable to explain the methodical difference between himself and "the average English intellectual". Collini notes that Orwell argues in "Notes on Nationalism" that the only way an intellectual can free themselves from the biases of nationalism is to make what "is essentially a moral effort". Collini adds that Orwell believes that few contemporary English intellectuals seem capable of this "moral effort". He states that Orwell sees the difference between himself and the other English intellectuals as a matter of "honesty and moral effort". Collini concludes by writing that in this essay, Orwell "comes close to endorsing that cliché of Blimpish culture: character is more important than intellect".

== See also ==
- La Trahison Des Clercs, a 1927 book by Julien Benda, which deals with many of the same themes as Notes on Nationalism.
- Gregory Claeys. "Orwell's 'Notes on Nationalism' and Nineteen Eighty-Four", in: Thomas Horan, ed. Critical Insights: Nineteen Eighty-Four (The Salem Press, 2016), pp. 71–82, connects the text with Nineteen Eighty-Four.
