= The Art of Donald McGill =

"The Art of Donald McGill" is a critical essay first published in 1941 by the English author George Orwell. It discusses the genre of English saucy seaside postcards that were sold mostly in small shops in British coastal towns, and particularly the work of its prime exponent, Donald McGill. Orwell notes the role of this type of humour as a rebellion against convention in society and states that, despite the vulgarity, he would be sorry to see the postcards vanish.

== Background ==
Seaside postcards represent the low humour and wordplay that was characteristic of the Victorian music hall. They were sold by newsagents and at booths along the front at British seaside holiday resorts.

McGill created an estimated 12,000 of the colour washed drawings which were then reproduced as postcards and an estimated 200 million were printed and sold. His career began in 1904 when he was encouraged by a relation who saw an illustrated get-well card McGill had made for a sick nephew. Within a year it was his full-time occupation. McGill studied art and married the daughter of the owner of Crowder's Music Hall in Greenwich. Such postcards were associated with embarrassment and McGill noted that his two daughters "ran like stags whenever they passed a comic postcard shop".

Orwell's interest in such postcards began in his schooldays in Eastbourne. Jacintha Buddicom recalls him around the age of twelve at Shiplake and Henley when he kept a collection in an album. She recalls that some were kept in a manilla envelope because they were "too vulgar" to be put on display. In "Such, Such Were the Joys" Orwell reports his alarm at being stared at with suspicion by a man as he came out a newsagent's shop in Eastbourne, although he says in the essay that he was buying sweets.

== Publication ==
"The Art of Donald McGill" was first published in Horizon in September 1941. The article has appeared in many anthologies including Critical Essays (1946), Collected Essays (1961), Decline of the English Murder and Other Essays (1965) and The Collected Essays, Journalism and Letters of George Orwell (1968), republished by the Donald McGill Museum & Archive Ryde (2010) with for the first time examples of the cards discussed accompanying the text.

== Summary ==
Orwell identifies the overpowering vulgarity, the crude drawing and unbearable colours of the seaside postcard which specialises in very 'low' humour. He selects McGill because he sees his work as the most representative and perfect in the tradition, although he is ignorant of whether McGill is a real individual or just a corporate name.

Orwell picks out the main subjects of the postcards as sex, home life, drunkenness, WC jokes, snobbery within the working-class, stereotypical figures and topical politico-social fads. They feature illegitimacy, the mother-in-law, the hen-pecked husband, the middle-aged drunk, chamber pots, the nervous clergyman who says the wrong thing, malapropisms and "an endless succession of fat women in tight bathing-dresses." He concludes that this reflects, on a comic level, the working-class outlook that youth and adventure, and even individual life, end with marriage.

Orwell considers that in England under censorship laws there is a wide gap between what can be said and what can be printed. He sees comic post cards as the only medium in which really "low" humour is printable although similar jokes are part and parcel of the revue and music-hall, and can be heard on the radio.

Orwell presents a thesis of duality in human nature which he calls the Don Quixote–Sancho Panza combination—the conflict between high-minded respectability and vulgar buffoonery. "Society has always to demand a little more from human beings than it will get in practice—that they should work hard, pay their taxes, and be faithful to their wives, men should think it glorious to die on the battlefield and women should want to wear themselves out with child-bearing. The postcards represent the worm's-eye view of life where "marriage is a dirty joke or a comic disaster... where the lawyer is always a crook and the Scotsman always a miser, where the newly-weds make fools of themselves on the hideous beds of seaside lodging-houses and the drunken, red-nosed husbands roll home at four in the morning to meet the linen-nightgowned wives who wait for them behind the front door, poker in hand". Orwell brings in a quotation from Ecclesiastes (vii 15).

Such postcards are therefore symptomatically important as a sort of saturnalia, a harmless rebellion against virtue. Orwell notes that the mood of the comic post card could appear between the murders in Shakespeare's tragedies but that this type of humour in literature had been repressed from the beginning of the 19th century and has dwindled to these "ill-drawn post cards, leading a barely legal existence in cheap stationers' windows".

== Postscript ==
In 1954, under a government crackdown on declining morals, McGill was prosecuted and fined under the Obscene Publications Act 1857. This almost wiped out the industry. In 1957 he gave evidence to a House of Commons Select Committee which was revising the legislation.

In the light of an exhibition of the work of McGill in 2004, various critics have challenged Orwell's dismissive view of the quality of the art.

== See also ==
- George Orwell bibliography
