= Charles Dickens (essay) =

1940 essay by George Orwell

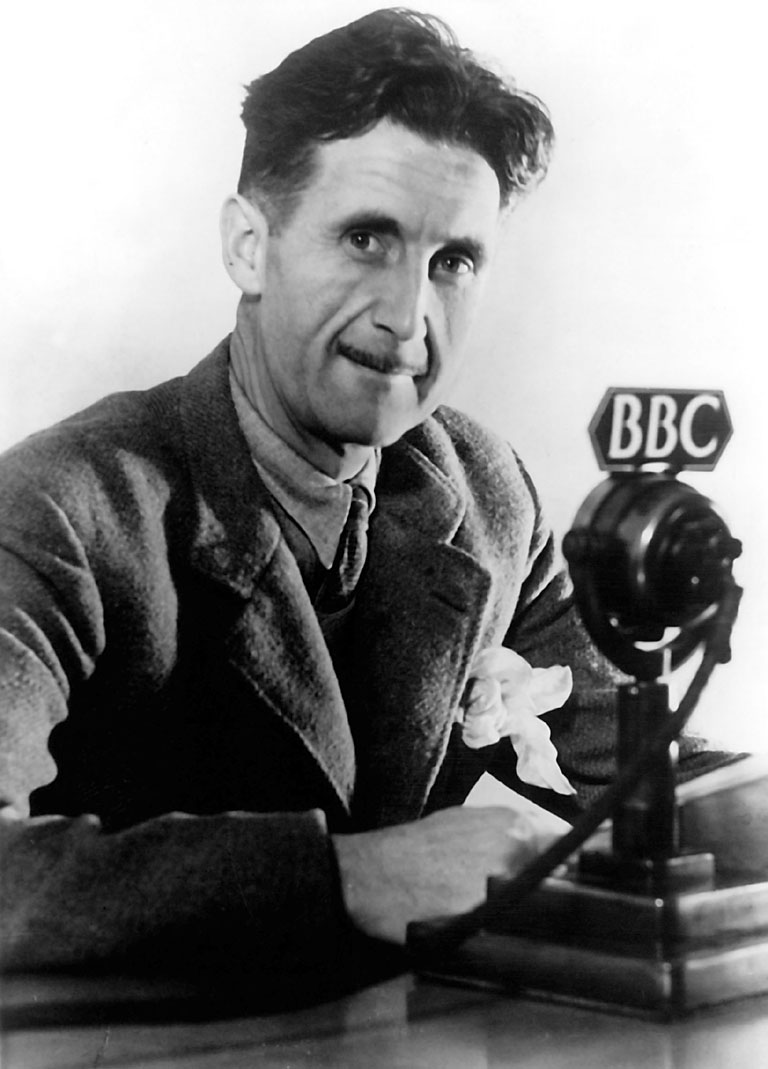
Orwell in 1940

"Charles Dickens" (1940) is the longest and widely considered to be one of the greatest of the essays of George Orwell. The product of a lifelong study of Dickens, it considers his work from literary, political and sociological angles, concluding that he was a bourgeois humanitarian liberal who, though critical of 19th-century society, advocated improvement by moral rather than political means. It was profoundly influential on critical opinion of its subject.

== Background ==
Orwell had known Dickens almost all his life, and could recall, before the age of 10, "having Dickens ladled down my throat by schoolmasters". When he grew to adulthood and became a novelist he came to identify with Dickens' mission to express his moral vision in fiction, and, in 1940, included him in a short list of the writers "I care most about and never grow tired of". One friend later remembered that "He and my husband used to talk endlessly about Dickens. He loved that." Orwell wrote on the subject throughout his professional life from his first published essay, in 1928, to his last, a review of Hesketh Pearson's biography, in 1949.

== Composition and publication ==
The writing of the essay took Orwell from May to July 1939. It was published on 11 March 1940 by the firm of Victor Gollancz in Inside the Whale and Other Essays, a collection of three works by Orwell on literary subjects. It was reprinted with some revisions in his later collection Critical Essays (1946) (published in the US as Dickens, Dali & Others), and in Collected Essays (1961).

== Thesis ==
Orwell balances Dickens' faults as a writer with his virtues. Against his sentimentality, lack of poetic feeling, unrealistically happy endings, poor construction, and failure to present genuine tragedy or to reflect the changing conditions of contemporary life Orwell sets his unforgettable characters, talent for description, and vitality of invention. But Orwell's critique of Dickens' work goes beyond narrowly literary concerns into sociological, political and historical ones. Reacting against the views previously advanced by T. A. Jackson that Dickens was a revolutionary writer in the Marxist sense and by G. K. Chesterton that he was a champion of the working class, Orwell holds in this essay that he was a thoroughly bourgeois writer who, however sympathetic with some, at least, of the poor, had no intimate knowledge of their way of life. Having no political solution to the social problems of his time, Orwell argues, Dickens could only call for men to behave more decently towards one another. Dickens, in fact, embraced a liberal humanitarianism whose virtues – decency, honesty, generosity and compassion – Orwell sincerely admired, and he suggested that Dickens' "merely moral criticism of society" might be more truly revolutionary than any fashionable brand of "politico-economic criticism".

== Reception ==
It is clear in retrospect that, more than any other influence, the publication of Orwell's essay, Edmund Wilson's "Dickens: The Two Scrooges" (1941), and the Nonesuch edition of Dickens's letters created the modern view of Dickens as a major literary figure rather than merely a successful self-taught popular novelist. There is wide agreement among critics that Orwell's "Charles Dickens" is one of his greatest essays and "a model of practical criticism", essential to any study of its subject. V. S. Pritchett, writing in 1950, thought it "the best English appreciation of Dickens of our time". It should, in J. R. Hammond's opinion, "be studied carefully by any reader interested in either Dickens or Orwell". Jeffrey Meyers praised its "freshness, vigour and suggestiveness", and even Richard Rees, who considered it "not strikingly original or profound", conceded that it was "one of his most attractive studies". Edmund Wilson, while finding them both original and interesting, thought that this and Orwell's essay on Kipling suffered from "a tendency to generalize about the first-rate writer, the whole work of a man's career, without following his development as an artist...and from a habit of taking complex personalities too much at their face value, of not getting inside them enough."

Critics from Eric Bentley and George Woodcock to Jeffrey Meyers have found Orwell's portrayal of Dickens as a writer and a man – the 19th-century liberal who honoured fairness, family life, peacefulness, and the decency of common people, and who hated bullying and tyranny – strangely reminiscent of Orwell himself. Richard Rees believed that "the open fighting, the generous anger, the freedom of intelligence [Orwell here found in Dickens] are all characteristics of Orwell's own writing".
