= Critical Essays (Orwell) =

1946 essay collection by George Orwell

First edition (publ. Secker & Warburg)

Critical Essays (1946) is a collection of wartime pieces by George Orwell. It covers a variety of topics in English literature, and also includes some pioneering studies of popular culture. It was acclaimed by critics, and Orwell himself thought it one of his most important books.

== Contents ==
- Charles Dickens

First published in Inside the Whale and Other Essays (1940).

- Boys' Weeklies

First published in an abridged form in Horizon, March 1940. Reprinted in Inside the Whale and Other Essays (1940).

- Wells, Hitler and the World State

Response to H. G. Wells Guide to the New World.
First published in Horizon, August 1941.

- The Art of Donald McGill

First published in Horizon, February 1942.

- Rudyard Kipling

Response to A Choice of Kipling's Verse, edited by T. S. Eliot.
First published in Horizon, February 1942.

- W. B. Yeats

Review of V. K. Narayana Menon The Development of William Butler Yeats.
First published in Horizon, January 1943.

- Benefit of Clergy: Some Notes on Salvador Dalí

Response to The Secret Life of Salvador Dalí.
According to a note by Orwell, "'Benefit of Clergy' made a sort of phantom appearance in the Saturday Book for 1944. The book was in print when its publishers, Messrs Hutchinson, decided that this essay must be suppressed on grounds of obscenity. It was accordingly cut out of each copy, though for technical reasons it was impossible to remove its title from the table of contents." Several copies, including Orwell's own, escaped this excision.

- Arthur Koestler

Unpublished before Critical Essays.

- Raffles and Miss Blandish

First published in Horizon, October 1944.

- In Defence of P. G. Wodehouse

First published in Windmill, no. 2, [July] 1945.

== Publication ==
In late 1944 Orwell, worrying about the ephemerality of magazine publication, began to collect a volume of his best essays. The resulting collection appeared under the imprint of Secker & Warburg on 14 February 1946, with a print-run of 3028 copies. The following May a second impression of 5632 copies was issued, with some small corrections. The US edition of 5000 copies was published in April 1946 by Reynal & Hitchcock, and retitled Dickens, Dali & Others: Studies in Popular Culture. A reprint in paperback dropped the subtitle.

== Themes ==
The blurb to the first edition described some of the essays as being "among the very few attempts that have been made in England to study popular art seriously". Orwell thought seemingly frivolous popular culture, such as crime fiction, comic postcards, and the Billy Bunter stories, to be worth studying for the light it throws on contemporary attitudes. Applying this approach to the subjects considered in Critical Essays he tended to find that they showed the innovations of his own time to be harsh and unfeeling compared to the old-fashioned humanity of traditional popular forms. Another theme is that of literary style, which Orwell thought to be the inevitable result of its writer's world-view and the message he wanted to get across. He considered the English language of the 1940s to be in a degenerate state, and held that political discourse was inevitably corrupted as a result.

== Critical reception ==
Orwell himself, writing before he had completed Nineteen Eighty-Four, said that he thought Critical Essays one of his three most important books, along with Animal Farm and Homage to Catalonia. His contemporaries in the world of criticism also largely saw the book's merits. The journalist Tosco Fyvel, writing in Tribune, acclaimed Orwell as "a national figure as a critic, satirist and political journalist", while disagreeing with Orwell's view that the Attlee government was uncommitted to the introduction a fully socialist society. In the Catholic paper The Tablet, Evelyn Waugh predictably deplored Orwell's lack of religious feeling, but also wrote that the essays "represent at its best the new humanism of the common man", and that Orwell was "outstandingly the wisest" of the new critics. Middleton Murry, who likewise criticised Orwell's secularism, nevertheless called Orwell and Cyril Connolly the two most gifted critics of their generation. V. S. Pritchett considered the essays "brilliant examples of political anthropology applied to literature by a non-conforming mind". Eric Bentley saw the book as "a dirge for nineteenth-century liberalism", and, like Irving Howe, thought it represented Orwell at his best. Edmund Wilson, a critic to whom most others compared Orwell, called him "the only contemporary master" of sociological criticism, praising him for his courage in rejecting the reigning orthodoxies, and for "a prose style that is both downright and disciplined". A recent survey of Orwell's work endorses his own high opinion of its importance, calling it "Orwell at his best", a book which "showed Orwell's talent for finding deep meaning in otherwise trivial matters", while Bernard Crick said that Orwell's essays "may well constitute his lasting claim to greatness as a writer".
