= Donald McGill =

English graphic artist (1875–1962)

- Donald McGill in his studio
- Born: January 28, 1875; London
- Died: October 13, 1962 (aged 87)
- Burial place: Streatham Park Cemetery
- Occupation: Artist
- Known for: Designing cartoon postcards

Donald Fraser Gould McGill (28 January 1875 – 13 October 1962) was an English graphic artist whose name has become synonymous with the genre of saucy postcards, particularly associated with the seaside (though they were sold throughout the UK).

The cards mostly feature an array of attractive young women, fat old ladies, drunken middle-aged men, honeymoon couples and vicars. He has been called 'the king of the saucy postcard', and his work is collected and appreciated for his artistic skill, power of social observation and earthy sense of humour. Even at the height of his fame he earned only three guineas a design, but by the 2000s his original artwork could fetch thousands of pounds.

== Early life ==
McGill was born in London in 1875. He lost a foot in a school rugby accident, and, having studied at Blackheath Proprietary School where his best friend was Campbell Richard Hone, a future Bishop of Wakefield, McGill spent most of his life in the Blackheath area of southeast London, living at 5 Bennett Park, SE3 – a blue plaque location.

He was a naval draughtsman until his career in postcards began accidentally in 1904 when an in-law encouraged him after seeing an illustrated get-well card he had made for a sick nephew. Within a year it was his full-time occupation. He studied art and married the daughter of the owner of Crowder's Music Hall in Greenwich.

== Artistic career ==
One of the cards used in evidence against McGill in 1954

McGill spent virtually the whole of his career creating the distinctive colour-washed drawings which were then reproduced as postcards. He ranked his output according to their vulgarity as mild, medium and strong, with strong being much the best sellers. His family, however, was steadfastly respectable. He said of his two daughters, "They ran like stags whenever they passed a comic postcard shop."

During the First World War he produced anti-German propaganda in the form of humorous postcards. They reflected on the war from the opinion, as he saw it, of the men serving, and the realities facing their families at home. Cards dealing with the so-called "home front" covered issues such as rationing, home service, war profiteers, spy scares and interned aliens. Recruitment and "slackers" were other topics covered.

Many cards were designed to appeal to the soldier who wished to send a card home to his sweetheart and these cards showed couples. Cards showed soldiers in training, and there were many light-hearted jokes about the Scottish soldier and his kilt. A few cards showed images of nursing sisters, and at least one showed three female munitions workers. There were relatively few cards depicting a soldier in action, and some depicted men in the Navy. Only a few of the military-themed cards were serious, such as one showing a British Red Cross medic caring for a wounded German soldier. In 1941, author George Orwell wrote an essay on McGill's work entitled "The Art of Donald McGill". Orwell concluded that in spite of the vulgarity and the low artistic merits of the cards, he would be sorry to see them go.

Approaching 80, McGill fell foul of several local censorship committees, which culminated in a major trial in Lincoln on 15 July 1954 for breaking the Obscene Publications Act 1857. He was found guilty and fined £50 with £25 costs. The wider result was a devastating blow to the saucy postcard industry; many postcards were destroyed as a result, and retailers cancelled orders. Several of the smaller companies were made bankrupt, as they had traded on very small margins.

In the late 1950s, the level of censorship eased off and the market recovered. In 1957, McGill gave evidence before a House of Commons select committee set up to amend the 1857 Act.

McGill produced an estimated 12,000 designs, of which 200 million copies are estimated to have been printed. He died in 1962 with all his designs for the 1963 season already prepared. He was buried in Streatham Park Cemetery in an unmarked grave. Despite their wide circulation, McGill earned no royalties from his designs; in his will, his estate was valued at just £735.

One of his postcards, featuring a bookish man and an embarrassed pretty woman sitting under a tree, with the caption: "Do you like Kipling?" / "I don't know, you naughty boy, I've never kippled!", holds the world record for selling the most copies, at over 6 million.

== Museum ==
On 10 July 2010, McGill's grandson Patrick Tumber opened the Donald McGill Postcard Museum, created by James Bissell-Thomas in Ryde, Isle of Wight. In 1953, Ryde had witnessed police raids on five shops in the town and the seizure of over 5,000 postcards, the majority by McGill.

== In popular culture ==
McGill's Kipling joke is used in a 1962 episode of The Beverly Hillbillies, "Pygmalion and Elly", in a scene with Elly May Clampett (Donna Douglas) and Sonny Drysdale (Louis Nye). The Kipling joke is also used in The Muppet Show and in the 1985 film Clue, in a scene with Miss Scarlet (Lesley Ann Warren) and Col. Mustard (Martin Mull).

== Bibliography ==
- Censored at the Seaside: The Censored Postcards of Donald McGill. Exhibition at Cartoon Art Gallery, London, 25 May – 31 July 2004
- Calder-Marshall, Arthur (1966). Wish You Were Here, The Art of Donald McGill. Hutchinson of London. ISBN 0-09-080061-3.
- Sutton, David (2000). A chorus of raspberries: British film comedy 1929–1939. Exeter: University of Exeter Press.
- Crossley, Bernard (2014). Donald McGill: Postcard Artist. Greaves & Thomas
- George Orwell, The Art of Donald McGill (written in 1941), in The Decline of the English Murder and Other Essays (Penguin books, 2009)
