= Raffles and Miss Blandish =

Essay by George Orwell

"Raffles and Miss Blandish" is an essay by the English writer George Orwell first published in Horizon in October 1944 as "The Ethics of the Detective Story from Raffles to Miss Blandish". Dwight Macdonald published the essay in politics in November 1944. It was reprinted in Critical Essays, London, 1946.

The essay contrasts the A. J. Raffles crime stories with the 1939 novel No Orchids for Miss Blandish by the crime writer James Hadley Chase and observes the "immense differences in moral atmosphere". In the semi-pornographic crime novel Orwell decries the breaking down of all taboos as the author attracts readers by violence, cruelty and sexual sadism. Orwell argues a direct connection between pornography and power worship. He refers to "realism", meaning the doctrine that might is right, by writing "The growth of 'realism' has been the great feature of the intellectual history of our own age. It is important to notice that the cult of power tends to be mixed up with a love of cruelty and wickedness for their own sakes.'

Orwell further notes that No Orchids for Miss Blandish is written in the American language and that many people were under the impression that it was an American book. "Evidently there are great numbers of English people who are partly Americanised in language, and one ought to add, in moral outlook. In America, both in life and fiction, the tendency to tolerate crime, even to admire the criminal so long as he is successful, is very much more marked."

== See also ==
- Decline of the English Murder
