= Decline of the English Murder =

Essay by George Orwell

- Cover of 1965 Penguin UK Edition
- Author: George Orwell
- Cover artist: Peter Blake
- Language: English
- Genre: Essays
- Publisher: Penguin Books
- Publication date: 1965
- Publication place: England
- English publication date: 1965
- Media type: Paperback
- Pages: 188 + covers

"Decline of the English Murder" is an essay by English writer George Orwell, wherein he analysed the kinds of murders depicted in popular media and why people like to read them. Tribune published it on 15 February 1946, and Secker and Warburg republished it after his death in Shooting an Elephant and Other Essays in 1952.

== Overview ==
Orwell identified several common features which 'have given the greatest amount of pleasure to the British public' during 'our great period in murder, between roughly 1850 and 1925' and may be considered from a News of the World reader's point of view, the "perfect" murder: middle class criminals, sex or respectability as a motif, mostly poisoning, deaths slow to be seen as due to crime, a dramatic coincidence or unbelievable occurrence, the aim of getting hold of a certain known sum of money - usually small, and domestic victims against an essentially domestic background.

Orwell excluded Jack the Ripper's murder spree as being "in a class by itself" and considered the cases of Dr. Palmer of Rugeley, Neill Cream, Mrs. Maybrick, Dr. Crippen, Frederick Seddon, Joseph Smith, Armstrong, Bywaters and Thompson, and an unnamed case from 1919, wherein the accused was acquitted. (Note: Under British Law it would open him to a charge of libel had he named him.)

Orwell then contrasted these with the Cleft Chin Murder, a recent murder during World War II, distinguished by its brutal casualness rather than by emotion or class. He suggested that this story became a distraction amid the doodle-bugs and created excitement because the man was sentenced to death and the girl to imprisonment. According to Orwell, a call for the girl also to be hanged flowed from the brutalizing effects of the war, and he thought that the story would not be as remembered as the older cases.

The essay's opening sentence pictures a typical working Englishman settling down at home with the News of the World after his Sunday lunch. The final issue of this newspaper in July 2011 quoted this sentence, claiming that Orwell had well-described the sentiments of the nation. However, media pundit Max Atkinson argued that Orwell was in fact satirizing the sensationalist tabloids.

The essay was later collected in a compilation entitled Decline of the English Murder and Other Essays, published by London's Penguin Group in 1965. The front cover of the 1978 reprint of this collection depicts a young man in a baker boy cap in a pub with a pint of beer. He is reading the Sunday, August 7, 1910 edition of the News of the World. The latest developments in the Crippen case feature on the front page.

His essay "Raffles and Miss Blandish" also casts a light on how he thought an English murder was in a different class from any other murder and compares a 'partly Americanised' sensibility to former times.

== See also ==
- Bibliography of George Orwell
- "On Murder Considered as one of the Fine Arts"
