= Politics and the English Language =

1946 essay by George Orwell

- Cover of the Penguin edition
- Author: George Orwell
- Publication date: 1946

"Politics and the English Language" (1946) is an essay by George Orwell that criticised the "ugly and inaccurate" written English of his time and examined the connection between political orthodoxies and the debasement of language. The essay has been widely cited in discussions of political communication and rhetoric, particularly in relation to the use of language to shape public perception.

The essay focused on political language, which, according to Orwell, "is designed to make lies sound truthful and murder respectable, and to give an appearance of solidity to pure wind". Orwell believed that the language used was necessarily vague or meaningless because it was intended to hide the truth rather than express it. This unclear prose was a "contagion" which had spread to those who did not intend to hide the truth, and it concealed a writer's thoughts from himself and others. He argued that this process was both cultural and political, reinforcing patterns of unclear thinking in public discourse. Orwell encourages concreteness and clarity instead of vagueness, and individuality over political conformity.

== Summary ==
Orwell relates what he believes to be a close association between bad prose and oppressive ideology:

In our time, political speech and writing are largely the defence of the indefensible. Things like the continuance of British rule in India, the Russian purges and deportations, the dropping of the atom bombs on Japan, can indeed be defended, but only by arguments which are too brutal for most people to face, and which do not square with the professed aims of political parties. Thus political language has to consist largely of euphemism, question-begging and sheer cloudy vagueness. Defenceless villages are bombarded from the air, the inhabitants driven out into the countryside, the cattle machine-gunned, the huts set on fire with incendiary bullets: this is called pacification. Millions of peasants are robbed of their farms and sent trudging along the roads with no more than they can carry: this is called transfer of population or rectification of frontiers. People are imprisoned for years without trial, or shot in the back of the neck or sent to die of scurvy in Arctic lumber camps: this is called elimination of unreliable elements. Such phraseology is needed if one wants to name things without calling up mental pictures of them.

One of Orwell's points is:

The great enemy of clear language is insincerity. When there is a gap between one's real and one's declared aims, one turns as it were instinctively to long words and exhausted idioms, like a cuttlefish spurting out ink.

The insincerity of the writer perpetuates the decline of the language as people (particularly politicians, Orwell later notes) attempt to disguise their intentions behind euphemisms and convoluted phrasing. Orwell says that this decline is self-perpetuating. He argues that it is easier to think with poor English because the language is in decline; and, as the language declines, "foolish" thoughts become even easier, reinforcing the original cause:

A man may take to drink because he feels himself to be a failure, and then fail all the more completely because he drinks. It is rather the same thing that is happening to the English language. It becomes ugly and inaccurate because our thoughts are foolish, but the slovenliness of our language makes it easier to have foolish thoughts.

Orwell discusses "pretentious diction" and "meaningless words". "Pretentious diction" is used to make biases look impartial and scientific, while "meaningless words" are used to stop the reader from seeing the point of the statement. According to Orwell: "In certain kinds of writing, particularly in art criticism and literary criticism, it is normal to come across long passages which are almost completely lacking in meaning."

=== Five passages ===
Orwell chooses five passages of text which "illustrate various of the mental vices from which we now suffer." The samples are: by Harold Laski ("five negatives in 53 words"), Lancelot Hogben (mixed metaphors), an essay by Paul Goodman on psychology in the July 1945 issue of Politics ("simply meaningless"), a communist pamphlet ("an accumulation of stale phrases") and a reader's letter in Tribune (in which "words and meaning have parted company"). From these, Orwell identifies a "catalogue of swindles and perversions" which he classifies as "dying metaphors", "operators or verbal false limbs", "pretentious diction" and "meaningless words". (See cliches, prolixity, peacock terms and weasel words.)

Orwell notes that writers of modern prose tend not to write in concrete terms but use a "pretentious Latinized style" (compare Anglish). He claims writers find it is easier to gum together long strings of words than to pick words specifically for their meaning—particularly in political writing, where Orwell notes that "[o]rthodoxy ... seems to demand a lifeless, imitative style". Political speech and writing are generally in defence of the indefensible and so lead to a euphemistic inflated style.

Orwell criticises bad writing habits which spread by imitation. He argues that writers must think more clearly because thinking clearly "is a necessary first step toward political regeneration". He later emphasises that he was not "considering the literary use of language, but merely language as an instrument for expressing and not for concealing or preventing thought".

=== "Translation" of Ecclesiastes ===
As a further example, Orwell "translates" Ecclesiastes 9:11:

I returned and saw under the sun, that the race is not to the swift, nor the battle to the strong, neither yet bread to the wise, nor yet riches to men of understanding, nor yet favour to men of skill; but time and chance happeneth to them all.

– into "modern English of the worst sort":

Objective consideration of contemporary phenomena compels the conclusion that success or failure in competitive activities exhibits no tendency to be commensurate with innate capacity, but that a considerable element of the unpredictable must invariably be taken into account.

Orwell points out that this "translation" contains many more syllables but gives no concrete illustrations, as the original did, nor does it contain any vivid, arresting images or phrases.

The headmaster's wife at St Cyprian's School, Mrs. Cicely Vaughan Wilkes (nicknamed "Flip"), taught English to Orwell and used the same method to illustrate good writing to her pupils. She would use simple passages from the King James Bible and then "translate" them into poor English to show the clarity and brilliance of the original. Walter John Christie, who followed Orwell to Eton College, wrote that Vaughan Wilkes preached the virtues of "simplicity, honesty, and avoidance of verbiage", and pointed out that the qualities "Flip" most prized were later to be seen in Orwell's writing.

=== Remedy of Six Rules ===
Orwell said it was easy for his contemporaries to slip into bad writing of the sort he had described and that the temptation to use meaningless or hackneyed phrases was like a "packet of aspirins always at one's elbow". In particular, such phrases are always ready to form the writer's thoughts, to save the writer the bother of thinking—or writing—clearly. He did conclude though that the progressive decline of the English language was reversible and suggested six rules he claimed would prevent many of these faults, although "one could keep all of them and still write bad English".

1. Never use a metaphor, simile, or other figure of speech which you are used to seeing in print. (Examples that Orwell gave included ring the changes, Achilles' heel, swan song, and hotbed. He described such phrases as "dying metaphors" and argued that they were used without knowing what was truly being said. Furthermore, he said that using metaphors of this kind made the original meaning of the phrases meaningless because those who used them did not know their original meaning. He wrote that "some metaphors now current have been twisted out of their original meaning without those who use them even being aware of the fact".)
2. Never use a long word where a short one will do.
3. If it is possible to cut a word out, always cut it out.
4. Never use the passive where you can use the active.
5. Never use a foreign phrase, a scientific word, or a jargon word if you can think of an everyday English equivalent.
6. Break any of these rules sooner than say anything outright barbarous.

== Publication ==
"Politics and the English Language" was first noted in Orwell's payment book of 11 December 1945. The essay was originally published in the April 1946 issue of the journal Horizon and was Orwell's last major article for the journal. The essay was originally intended for George Weidenfeld's Contact magazine but it was turned down.

From the time of his wife's death in March 1945 Orwell had maintained a high output rate, with some 130 literary contributions, many of them lengthy. Animal Farm had been published in August 1945 and Orwell was experiencing a time of critical and commercial literary success. He was seriously ill in February and desperate to get away from London to the island of Jura, Scotland, where he wanted to start work on Nineteen Eighty-Four.

"Politics and the English Language" was published nearly simultaneously with another of Orwell's essays, "The Prevention of Literature". Both reflect Orwell's concern with truth and how truth depends upon the use of language. Orwell noted the deliberate use of misleading language to hide unpleasant political and military facts and also identified a laxity of language among those he identified as pro-Soviet. In "The Prevention of Literature" he also speculated on the type of literature which, under a future totalitarian society, he predicted would be formulaic and low-grade sensationalism. Around the same time, Orwell wrote an unsigned editorial for Polemic in response to an attack from Modern Quarterly. In this he highlights the double-talk and appalling prose of J. D. Bernal in the same magazine, and cites Edmund Wilson's damnation of the prose of Joseph E. Davies in Mission to Moscow.

== Critical reception ==
In his biography of Orwell, Michael Shelden called the article "his most important essay on style", while Bernard Crick made no reference to the work at all in his original biography, reserving his praise for Orwell's essays in Polemic, which cover a similar political theme. John Rodden asserts, given that much of Orwell's work was polemical, that he sometimes violated these rules and Orwell himself concedes that, if you look through his essay, "for certain you will find that I have again and again committed the very faults I am protesting against". Rodden also says that Terry Eagleton had praised the essay's demystification of political language but later became disenchanted with Orwell. The essay has also been frequently included in writing and composition curricula, where it is used to illustrate principles of clarity and concision in prose.

Linguist Geoffrey Pullum—despite being an admirer of Orwell's writing— dismissed the essay as "dishonest" and criticised it for "its insane and unfollowable insistence that good writing must avoid all phrases and word uses that are familiar". Orwell's admonition to avoid using the passive voice has also been criticised. Merriam–Webster's Dictionary of English Usage refers to three statistical studies of passive versus active sentences in various periodicals, stating: "the highest incidence of passive constructions was 13 percent. Orwell runs to a little over 20 percent in 'Politics and the English Language'. Clearly he found the construction useful in spite of his advice to avoid it as much as possible".

Introductory writing courses frequently cite this essay. A 1999 study found that it was reprinted 118 times in 325 editions of 58 readers published between 1946 and 1996 that were intended for use in college-level composition courses.

In 1981, Carl Freedman's article "Writing Ideology, and Politics: Orwell's 'Politics and the English Language' and English Composition" set in motion a "wide variety of critiques, reconsiderations, and outright attacks against the plain style" that Orwell argues for. The main issue found was Orwell's "simplistic faith about thought and language existing in a dialectical relation with one another; others quickly cut to the chase by insisting that politics, rightly considered, meant the insertion of an undercutting whose before every value word the hegemony holds dear". These critics also began to question Orwell's argument for the absoluteness of the English language, and asked whose values and truths were being represented through the language.

Louis Menand criticized the essay in a 2003 retrospective of the author in The New Yorker, saying that Orwell "makes it seem that the problem with fascism (and the rest) is, at bottom, a problem of style," that "ugliness has no relation to insincerity or evil, and short words with Anglo-Saxon roots have no relation to truth or goodness." Menand continued, "All politics, (Orwell) writes, 'is a mass of lies, evasions, folly, hatred and schizophrenia.' And by the end of the essay he has damned the whole discourse."

Orwell's writings on the English language have had a large impact on classrooms, journalism and other writing. George Trail, in "Teaching Argument and the Rhetoric of Orwell's 'Politics and the English Language'", says "A large part of Orwell's rhetorical approach consists of attempting at every opportunity to acquire reader participation, to involve the reader as an active and engaged consumer of the essay. Popular journalism is full of what may be the inheritance of Orwell's reader involvement devices". Haltom and Ostrom's work, Teaching George Orwell in Karl Rove's World: 'Politics and the English Language' in the 21st Century Classroom, discusses how following Orwell's six rules of English writing and speaking can have a place in high school and university settings.

== Connection to other works ==
Orwell's preoccupation with language as a theme can be seen in his protagonist's dislike of advertising slogans in Keep the Aspidistra Flying, an early work. This preoccupation is also visible in Homage to Catalonia, and continues as an underlying theme of Orwell's work in the years after World War II.

The themes in "Politics and the English Language" anticipate Orwell's development of Newspeak in Nineteen Eighty-Four. Michael Shelden calls Newspeak "the perfect language for a society of bad writers...because it reduces the number of choices available to them". Shelden says that Newspeak first corrupts writers morally, then politically, "since it allows writers to cheat themselves and their readers with ready-made prose".

== See also ==
- Academese
- A Dictionary of Modern English Usage
- A preliminary discussion of literary reform
- Doublespeak Award
- Orwell Awards
- Plain English
- Pleonasm
- The Elements of Style
- Verbosity
