= Jeffrey Meyers =

American biographer, literary, art and film critic

- Born: April 1, 1939 (age 87); New York City, U.S.
- Education: University of Michigan
- Occupations: Biographer; critic: modern literature, art, film
- Known for: Lives of Ernest Hemingway, Scott Fitzgerald, Edmund Wilson, D. H. Lawrence, Joseph Conrad, George Orwell
- Spouse: Valerie Meyers
- Children: Rachel

Jeffrey Meyers (born April 1, 1939) is an American biographer and literary, art, and film critic.

== Life ==
As of 2018, Jeffrey Meyers has published 54 books and 980 articles on art, film, and modern American, English, and European literature. His wide range of interests include bibliography, editing, literary criticism, and biography. He is a specialist in archival research and published the FBI file on Ernest Hemingway, love letters by Hemingway, and literary manuscripts by Wyndham Lewis, Ezra Pound, and Roy Campbell. Meyers has had 33 works translated into 14 languages and has been called a "serial biographer" due to his prolific output.

He has been interviewed many times and has appeared in documentary films about Edgar Allan Poe, Gary Cooper, and Errol Flynn, and BBC-TV programs on Hemingway and D. H. Lawrence. He has spoken on television about his literary discoveries on CBS Morning News and about Orwell on C-SPAN's Booknotes.

== Publications ==
=== Biographies ===
- A Fever at the Core: The Idealist in Politics. London: London Magazine Editions; New York: Barnes & Noble, 1976.
- Married to Genius. London: London Magazine Editions; New York: Barnes & Noble, 1977.
- Katherine Mansfield: A Biography. London: Hamish Hamilton, 1978, 2nd printing 1979; New York: New Directions, 1980.
- The Enemy: A Biography of Wyndham Lewis. London: Routledge & Kegan Paul, 1980; Boston: Routledge & Kegan Paul, 1982.
- Hemingway: A Biography. New York: Harper & Row, 1985; Toronto: Fitzhenry & Whiteside, 1985; London: Macmillan, 1986; Melbourne: Macmillan, 1986.
- Manic Power: Robert Lowell and His Circle. London: Macmillan; New York: Arbor House, 1987.
- D. H. Lawrence: A Biography. New York: Knopf; London: Macmillan; Toronto: Random House; Melbourne: Macmillan, 1990.
- Joseph Conrad: A Biography. London: John Murray; New York: Scribner; Toronto: Maxwell Macmillan Canada, 1991.
- Edgar Allan Poe: His Life and Legacy. London: John Murray; New York: Scribner; Toronto: Maxwell Macmillan Canada, 1992.
- Scott Fitzgerald: A Biography. New York and Toronto: HarperCollins; London: Macmillan, 1994.
- Edmund Wilson: A Biography. Boston: Houghton Mifflin; London: Constable, 1995.
- Portuguese translation: Editora Civilizacão Brasileira, 1997.
- Robert Frost: A Biography. Boston: Houghton Mifflin; London: Constable, 1996.
- Bogart: A Life in Hollywood. Boston: Houghton Mifflin; London: André Deutsch, 1997.
- Gary Cooper: American Hero. New York: William Morrow, 1998; London: Robert Hale, 2001.
- Privileged Moments: Encounters with Writers. Madison and London: University of Wisconsin Press, 2000.
- Orwell: Wintry Conscience of a Generation. New York and London: Norton; Toronto: Viking-Penguin, 2000.
- Inherited Risk: Errol and Sean Flynn in Hollywood and Vietnam. New York: Simon and Schuster, 2002.
- Somerset Maugham: A Life. New York: Knopf; Toronto: Random House, 2004.
- Paperback edition: New York: Vintage Books, 2005.
- Impressionist Quartet: The Intimate Genius of Manet and Morisot, Degas and Cassatt. New York: Harcourt, 2005.
- Modigliani: A Life. New York: Harcourt; London, Duckworth; Sydney: Tower, 2006.
- Serialized in Daily Mail (London), 23 June 2006, pp. 36–37.
- Samuel Johnson: The Struggle. New York: Basic Books, 2008.
- The Genius and the Goddess: Arthur Miller and Marilyn Monroe. London: Hutchinson, 2009; Urbana: University of Illinois Press, 2010.
- John Huston: Courage and Art. New York and Toronto: Crown Archetype (imprint of Random House), 2011.
- Robert Lowell in Love. Amherst: University of Massachusetts Press, 2016.
- Resurrections: Authors, Heroes--and a Spy. Charlottesville and London: University of Virginia Press, 2018.

=== Literary criticism ===
- Fiction and the Colonial Experience. Ipswich, England: Boydell Press; Totowa, New Jersey: Rowman & Littlefield, 1973.
- The Wounded Spirit: A Study of "Seven Pillars of Wisdom". Preface by Sir Alec Kirkbride. London: Martin, Brian & O'Keeffe, 1973.
- A Reader's Guide to George Orwell. London: Thames & Hudson, 1975; Totowa, New Jersey: Littlefield & Adams, 1977.
- Painting and the Novel. Manchester: Manchester University Press; New York: Barnes & Noble, 1975.
- Homosexuality and Literature, 1890-1930. London: Athlone Press of London University; Montreal: McGill-Queen's University Press, 1977.
- D. H. Lawrence and the Experience of Italy. Philadelphia and London: University of Pennsylvania Press, 1982.
- Disease and the Novel, 1860-1960. London: Macmillan; New York: St. Martin's, 1985.
- The Spirit of Biography. Ann Arbor and London: UMI Research Press, 1989.
- Hemingway: Life into Art. New York: Cooper Square; London: National Book Network, 2000.
- Orwell: Life and Art. Urbana and London: University of Illinois Press, 2010.
- Thomas Mann's Artist-Heroes. Evanston and London: Northwestern University Press, 2014; Sydney: Angus & Robertson, 2014.

=== Bibliographies ===
- T. E. Lawrence: A Bibliography. New York and London: Garland, 1974.
- Catalogue of the Library of the Late Siegfried Sassoon. London: Christie's, June 4, 1975.
- George Orwell: An Annotated Bibliography of Criticism. New York and London: Garland, 1977.

=== Edited collections ===
- George Orwell: The Critical Heritage. London and Boston: Routledge & Kegan Paul, 1975. Reprinted 1997 and 2001.
- Hemingway: The Critical Heritage. London and Boston: Routledge & Kegan Paul, 1982. Reprinted 1997 and 1999.
- Robert Lowell: Interviews and Memoirs. Ann Arbor: University of Michigan Press, 1988; Toronto: Fitzhenry & Whiteside, 1988.
- The Sir Arthur Conan Doyle Reader: From Sherlock Holmes to Spiritualism. New York: Cooper Square; London: National Book Network, 2002.
- The W. Somerset Maugham Reader: Novels, Stories, Travel Writing. Lanham, Maryland: Taylor; London: National Book Network, 2004.

=== Edited collections of original essays ===
- Wyndham Lewis; A Revaluation. London: Athlone Press; Montreal: McGill-Queen's University Press, 1980.
- Wyndham Lewis by Roy Campbell. Edited, with an Introduction and Notes. Pietermaritzburg: University of Natal Press, 1985.
- D. H. Lawrence and Tradition. London: Athlone Press; Amherst, Mass.: University of Massachusetts Press, 1985.
- The Craft of Literary Biography. London: Macmillan; New York: Schocken, 1985.
- The Legacy of D. H. Lawrence. London: Macmillan; New York: St. Martin's, 1987.
- The Biographer's Art. London: Macmillan; New York: New Amsterdam Books, 1989.
- T. E. Lawrence: Soldier, Writer, Legend. London: Macmillan; New York: St. Martin's, 1989.
- Graham Greene: A Revaluation. London: Macmillan; New York: St. Martin's, 1990.

=== Edited letters ===
- Remembering Iris Murdoch: Letters and Interviews, with a Memoir. New York and London: Palgrave-Macmillan, 2013.
- The Mystery of the Real: Letters of the Canadian Artist Alex Colville and Biographer Jeffrey Meyers. Edited, with Four Essays, by Jeffrey Meyers. Brighton, England and Chicago: Sussex Academic Press, 2016.

=== Introductions to books ===
- "Introduction" to Katherine Mansfield. Four Poems. London: Eric and Joan Stevens, 1980.
- "Introduction" to Best Short Stories of Rudyard Kipling. New York: New American Library, Signet Classics, 1987. Pp. vii-xvi.
- "Introduction" to 'Robert Louis Stevenson. The Body-Snatcher and Other Stories. New York: New American Library, Signet Classics, 1988. Pp. vii-xviii.
- "Introduction" to D. H. Lawrence. The Rainbow. New York: Bantam, 1991. Pp. vii-xvi.
- "Introduction" to Ford Madox Ford. The Good Soldier. New York: Bantam, 1991. Pp. v-xviii.
- "Introduction" to Katherine Mansfield. Stories. New York: Vintage, 1991. Pp. vii-xiv.
- "Introduction and Notes" to F. Scott Fitzgerald. The Great Gatsby. London: Dent-Everyman, 1993. Pp. viii-xxvii, 135-164.
- "Introduction and Notes" to F. Scott Fitzgerald. Tender is the Night. London: Dent-Everyman, 1993. Pp. viii-xxxii, 295-330.
- "Foreword" to Sachidananda Mohanty. Lawrence's Leadership Politics and the Defeat of Fascism. New Delhi: Academic Foundation Press, 1993. pp. 9–11.
- "Introduction" to W. Somerset Maugham. The Moon and Sixpence. New York: Bantam, 1995. Pp. v-xiv.
- "Introduction" to Sherwood Anderson. Winesburg, Ohio. New York: Bantam, 1995. Pp. ix-xx.
- "Introduction and Notes" to Robert Frost. Early Frost: The First Three Books. Hopewell, New Jersey: Ecco Press, 1996; Toronto: Penguin, 1996. Pp. xi-xxxv, 195-198.
- "Introduction" to E. M. Forster. Where Angels Fear to Tread. New York: Bantam, 1996. Pp. vii-xix.
- "Introduction" to D. H. Lawrence. The Lost Girl. New York: Bantam, 1996. Pp. vii-xvii.
- "Introduction" to E. M. Forster. The Longest Journey. New York: Bantam, 1997. Pp. ix-xix.
- "Introduction" to Billy Wilder. Sunset Boulevard. Berkeley and London: University of California Press, 1999. Pp. vii-xvii. Italian translation; 2004.
- "Introduction" to Billy Wilder. Stalag 17. Berkeley and London: University of California Press, 1999. Pp. vii-xv.
- "Introduction" to Billy Wilder. Double Indemnity. Berkeley and London: University of California Press, 2000. Pp. vii-xvi. Italian translation; 2004.
- "Introduction" to Billy Wilder. The Lost Weekend. Berkeley and London: University of California Press, 2000. Pp. vii-xiv.
- "Introduction" to Joseph Conrad. Under Western Eyes. London and New York: Folio Society, 2000. pp. 7–13.
- "Introduction" to Joseph Conrad. Under Western Eyes. New York: Modern Library, 2001. Pp. ix-xvi.
- "Introduction" to Jeffrey Meyers. Katherine Mansfield: A Biography. New York: Cooper Square, 2002. Pp. xv-xxi.
- "Introduction" to Edgar Allan Poe. The Narrative of Arthur Gordon Pym. New York: Modern Library, 2002. Pp. ix-xvii.
- "Introduction" to Errol Flynn. My Wicked, Wicked Ways. New York: Cooper Square; London: Aurum, 2003. pp. 3–7.
- "Introduction" to Christopher Isherwood. The Condor and the Cows. Minneapolis: University of Minnesota Press, 2003. Pp. xiii-xxiv.
- "Introduction and Notes" to Edith Wharton. The House of Mirth. New York: Barnes & Noble Classics, 2003. Pp. xiii-xl. Reprinted 2004.
- "Introduction and Notes" to Rudyard Kipling. Kim. New York: Barnes & Noble Classics, 2004. Pp. xv-xxxiii.
- "Introduction" to Joseph Conrad. The Mirror of the Sea and A Personal Record. London and New York: Folio Society, 2005. pp. 9–17.
- "Introduction and Notes" to Nikolai Gogol. Dead Souls. New York: Barnes & Noble Classics, 2005. Pp. ix-xxxii.
- "Afterword" to Bram Stoker. Dracula. New York: Signet, 2007. pp. 381–389.
- "Afterword" to Thomas Hardy. The Return of the Native. New York: Signet, 2008. pp. 403–412.
- "Afterword" to Stephen Crane. The Red Badge of Courage. New York: Signet, 2011. pp. 226–233.
- "Afterword" to Lewis Carroll. Alice's Adventures in Wonderland and Through the Looking-Glass. New York: Signet, 2011. pp. 227–235.
- "Introduction" to Joseph Conrad. The Secret Agent. Milwaukee: Wiseblood, 2014. pp. 1–7.

== Awards ==
- Tufts University Faculty Fellowship, 1968.
- American Council of Learned Societies, 1970.
- Huntington Library, 1971.
- Two University of Colorado Research Grants, 1976.
- Fulbright to Brazil, 1977–78, (won but fellowship not accepted).
- University of Colorado Faculty Fellowship, 1978-79.
- Guggenheim Fellowship, 1978-79.
- American Council of Learned Societies, 1983-1984.
- University of Colorado Faculty Fellowship, 1986-87.
- University of Colorado Research Grant, 1988.
- University of Colorado Faculty Fellowship, 1991-92.

== Honors ==
- Fellow of the Royal Society of Literature, 1983.
- Visiting Scholar, University of California, Berkeley, 1986-87.
- University of Colorado Research Lecturer, 1988.
- Visiting Scholar, University of California, Berkeley, 1992-94.
- American Academy of Arts and Letters: Award in Literature, 2005
- Judge of PEN Biography Award, 2010.
- Seymour Lectures, National Library of Australia, Canberra, Melbourne and Sydney, 2012.

== Literary accolades of Meyers' Hemingway: A Biography ==
Anthony Powell and Anthony Burgess praised Meyers' Hemingway: A Biography. Tom Stoppard chose it as the "Best Book of the Year" in 1986. In America, the poet James Dickey noted: "Meyers has given us an extremely valuable deepening of what is quite likely to prove Hemingway's greatest work, his life." The National Book Award winner J. F. Powers said: "This is simply the best book there is on Hemingway, thorough, perceptive, no holds barred, highly entertaining, so good and right on the famous writer and also on the famous performer who acted from the All-American hope that what goes up may not come down, but did, in this case, tragically." George Painter, the distinguished biographer of Marcel Proust, wrote: "I believe that Professor Meyers' Hemingway is one of the great biographies of our half-century, a masterwork in which true scholarship and creative art are so united as to become indistinguishable, and worthy to belong with Richard Ellmann's James Joyce, [Leslie] Marchand's Byron or Michael Holroyd's Lytton Strachey. Ellmann's passing has been universally mourned; but one can at least feel that the world now has a new major biographer."

== Selected bibliography on Jeffrey Meyers ==
- Directory of American Scholars. 8th edition. New York, 1982. P. 482.
- Debrett's People of Today. London, 1994. P. 1397.
- World Authors, 1985-1990. Ed. Vineta Colby. New York: H.W. Wilson, 1995. pp. 555–558.
- International Authors and Writers Who's Who. 16th edition. Cambridge, England 1999. P. 419.
- Writers Directory. 15th edition. Detroit, 2000. P. 1056.
- Outstanding Authors of the 20th Century. Cambridge, England, 2000.
- 2000 Outstanding Intellectuals of the 20th Century. Cambridge, England, 2000.
- Contemporary Authors. vol. 181. Detroit, 2000. pp. 299–318. Revised and reprinted in vol. 186. Detroit, 2000. pp. 233–253.
- Contemporary Authors New Revision. vol. 54. Detroit, 1997. pp. 302–307. Revised and expanded in vol. 102. Detroit, 2002. pp. 299–345. Revised and expanded in vol. 159. Detroit, 2007. pp. 273–281.
- Who's Who in America. New Providence, N.J.: Marquis, 2016. 2.2640.
- Howard Moss. "Katherine Mansfield". Whatever Is Moving. Boston: Little, Brown, 1981. pp. 183–195.
- Geoffrey Grigson. "The Ogre in the Black Hat." Blessings, Kicks and Curses. London: Allison & Busby, 1982. pp. 34–36.
- Tom Stoppard, "Best Book of the Year: Hemingway," Observer (London), 30 November 1986, p. 21.
- Baird Shuman. "Hemingway: A Biography by Jeffrey Meyers." Contemporary Literary Criticism Yearbook, 1985. Ed. Sharon Hall. Detroit: Gale, 1986.pp. 427–435.
- Howard Moss. "Katherine Mansfield." Minor Monuments. New York: Ecco, 1986. pp. 211–223.
- Denis Brian. The True Gen: An Intimate Portrait of Hemingway by Those Who Knew Him Best. New York: Grove, 1988. Pp. 32, 65, 90-91, 104, 143, 160, 190, 226, 231, 254-255, 258-259, 267, 276, 279, 281-286, 340.
- Denis Donoghue. "Wyndham Lewis." England, Their England. New York: Knopf, 1988. pp. 290–293.
- Anthony Powell. "Hemingway." Miscellaneous Verdicts. London: Heinemann, 1990. pp. 235–237.
- Mark Allister. "Jeffrey Meyers." Dictionary of Literary Biography: Twentieth Century American Literary Biographers. Second Series. Columbia, S. C.: Bruccoli Clark Layman, 1991. pp. 186–98.
- Francis King, "Best Book of the Year: Edmund Wilson," Spectator, 275, 18 November 1995, p. 48.
- Milan Kundera. "Hemingway." Testaments Betrayed. New York: HarperCollins, 1995. pp. 142–145.
- Ian Hamilton, "Edmund Wilson's Wounds." The Trouble with Money. London: Bloomsbury, 1998. pp. 31–39.
- Hilton Kramer. "The Edmund Wilson Centenary." The Twilight of the Intellectuals. Chicago: Ivan Dee, 1999. pp. 95–106.
- Elizabeth Hardwick. "Edmund Wilson." Sight-Readings. New York: Random House, 1998. pp. 204–218.
- John Rodden. Scenes from an Afterlife: The Legacy of George Orwell. Wilmington, Delaware: ISI Books, 2003. pp. 163–176.
- Carl Rollyson. "Edmund Wilson." American Biography. Lincoln, Nebraska: Universe Books, 2006. pp. 272–275.
- William Boyd. "Katherine Mansfield." Bamboo: Essays and Criticism. New York: Bloomsbury, 2007. pp. 91–93.
- Paul Theroux. The Tao of Travel. Boston: Houghton Mifflin Harcourt, 2012. pp. 217–218, 282-283..
