= Politics vs. Literature =

"Politics vs. Literature: An Examination of Gulliver's Travels" is a critical essay published in 1946 by the English author George Orwell. The essay is a review of Gulliver's Travels with a discussion of its author Jonathan Swift. The essay first appeared in Polemic No 5 in September 1946.

== Background ==
Within the essay, Orwell refers to receiving a copy of Gulliver's Travels on his eighth birthday and claims to have read it not less than half a dozen times since. He refers to it as "a rancorous as well as a pessimistic book", going on to add that "it descends into political partisanship of a narrow kind." Orwell admits that while it might seem that his object in writing the essay was to "refute" Swift and "belittle" him, adding that he is against Swift in a political and moral sense, he nevertheless states that Swift is "one of the writers I admire with least reserve".

== Argument ==
Orwell declares that Gulliver's Travels is an attack on humanity, the aim being to "humiliate Man by reminding him that he is weak and ridiculous, and above all that he stinks". He notes that Swift's political affiliations were perversely reactionary and were partly driven by personal disappointment. Orwell also finds fault with Swift's highly critical attitude to pure science and discovery. Nevertheless, there appear to be moments when Swift loses hold of the satire and introduces some constructive political thought - particularly in identifying the dangers of totalitarianism.

Swift, claims Orwell, had much in common with Tolstoy in incuriosity and intolerance. A third criticism is Swift's constant harping on disease, dirt and deformity - and Orwell introduces his view of these as particular horrors of childhood. He concludes that Swift is a diseased writer, riven with disgust, rancour and pessimism. Although against Swift in a moral and political sense, he nevertheless admires Gulliver's Travels highly. Arguing that enjoyment can overwhelm disapproval, he rejects the argument that a book cannot be good if it expresses a palpably false view of life and concludes that in spite of its author, Gulliver's Travels is a great work of art.

== Review ==
This and the other three essays by Orwell published in Polemic are considered by Bernard Crick as Orwell's finest essays.

== Excerpts ==
But Swift's greatest contribution to political thought, in the narrower sense of the words, is his attack, especially in Part III, on what would now be called totalitarianism. He has an extraordinary clear prevision of the spy-haunted 'police State', with its endless heresy hunts and treason trials, all really designed to neutralize popular discontent by changing it into war hysteria.

We are right to think of Swift as a rebel and iconoclast, but except in certain secondary matters, such as his insistence that women should receive the same education as men, he cannot be labelled 'left'. He is a Tory anarchist, despising authority while disbelieving in liberty, and preserving the aristocratic outlook while seeing clearly that the existing aristocracy is degenerate and contemptible.

[T]he best books of any one age have always been written from several different viewpoints, some of them palpably more false than others. In so far as a writer is a propagandist, the most one can ask of him is that he shall genuinely believe in what he is saying, and that it shall not be something blazingly silly. To-day, for example, one can imagine a good book being written by a Catholic, a Communist, a Fascist, pacifist, an anarchist, perhaps by an old-style Liberal or an ordinary Conservative: one cannot imagine a good book being written by a spiritualist, a Buchmanite or a member of the Ku-Klux-Klan. The views that a writer holds must be compatible with sanity, in the medical sense, and with the power of continuous thought: beyond that what we ask of him is talent, which is probably another name for conviction. Swift did not possess ordinary wisdom, but he did possess a terrible intensity of vision, capable of picking out a single hidden truth and then magnifying it and distorting it. The durability of Gulliver's Travels goes to show that, if the force of belief is behind it, a world-view which only just passes the test of sanity is sufficient to produce a great work of art.

== See also ==
- Bibliography of George Orwell
