= Boys' Weeklies =

Essay by George Orwell

"Boys' Weeklies" is an essay by George Orwell in which he analyses those weekly story-paper publications for boys which were current around 1940. After being published in Horizon in abridged form, it was published alongside two of his other pieces in Inside the Whale and Other Essays from Victor Gollancz Ltd.

The essay deals primarily with the School Stories published in The Magnet and The Gem and also with the 'Tuppenny Bloods' published by D.C. Thomson.

He suggested that the style of The Magnet and Gem was deliberately formulaic so that it could be copied by a panel of authors whom he erroneously supposed to lie behind the author's names. He also denigrated the works as outdated, snobbish and right-wing. He characterises the mental world of The Magnet and Gem as being "1910 – or 1940, but it is all the same ... there is a cosy fire in the study ... The King is on his throne ... Everything will be the same forever."

He then addressed what he regarded as more up-to-date papers, DC Thomson's tuppenny bloods. He notes that the stories were shorter and faster-paced and tend to be dominated by a single figure.

He suggests the working classes are depicted in a stereotyped manner in both types of paper and regrets the absence of any Socialist perspective. According to Orwell the weeklies avoid describing any form of working class life and do not mention long-term unemployment or the dole.

Orwell wrote that the weeklies serve the function of instilling into the minds of young boys the ideas that "the problems of our time do not exist, that there is nothing wrong with laissez-faire capitalism, that foreigners are unimportant comics and that the British Empire is a sort of charity-concern which will last forever". In the final paragraph he summarises by writing "All fiction from the novels in the mushroom libraries downwards is censored in the interests of the ruling class. And boy's fiction above all ... is sodden in the worst illusions of 1910. The fact is only unimportant if one believes that what is read in childhood leaves no impression behind. Lord Camrose and his colleagues evidently believe nothing of the kind, and, after all, Lord Camrose ought to know".

Charles Hamilton later published a reply to his comments about The Magnet and Gem, under the Magnet pen-name of Frank Richards; this reply included his first public acknowledgement of himself as author of both papers and defended the wholesome nature of the stories as being appropriate for his audience.

== See also ==
- Bibliography of George Orwell
- Story papers
