= Stefan Collini =

English literary critic

Stefan Collini (born 6 September 1947) is an English literary critic and academic who is Emeritus Professor of English Literature and Intellectual History at the University of Cambridge and an Emeritus Fellow of Clare Hall. He has contributed essays to such publications as The Times Literary Supplement, The Nation and the London Review of Books. He attended St Joseph's College in Beulah Hill, south London, and received his undergraduate BA degree and PhD at Jesus College, Cambridge, as well as completing a master's degree at Yale University.

== Bibliography ==
- That Noble Science of Politics: A Study in Nineteenth-Century Intellectual History (1983) with J. W. Burrow and Donald Winch
- Public Moralists: Political Thought and Intellectual Life in Britain 1850–1930 (1991)
- The Two Cultures, by C. P. Snow, introduction by Stefan Collini (1993)
- Matthew Arnold: A Critical Portrait (1994)
- English Pasts: Essays in History and Culture (1999)
- "'No Bullshit' Bullshit." London Review of Books. 23 January 2003. (accessed 29 October 2009).
- Absent Minds: Intellectuals in Britain (2006)
- Common Reading: Critics, Historians, Publics (2009)
- "Modernism and the little magazines." The Times Literary Supplement. 7 October 2009. (accessed 8 October 2009).
- That's Offensive!: Criticism, Identity, Respect, Seagull Books (15 February 2011).
- What Are Universities For?, Penguin (23 February 2012)
- Common Writing: Essays on Literary Culture and Public Debate, Oxford (2016)
- Collini, Stefan (2017). Speaking of Universities. London: Verso.
- The Nostalgic Imagination. History in English Criticism. Oxford University Press (2020)

=== Critical studies and reviews of Collini's work ===
- Reitter, Paul (22 February 2018). "The Business of Learning". The New York Review of Books. 65 (3): 30, 32–33. Review of Speaking of Universities.
