= Absent Minds: Intellectuals in Britain =

Book written by Stefan Collini

Absent Minds: Intellectuals in Britain is a 2006 book written by Stefan Collini and published by Oxford University Press.

== Content ==
Collini's focus is upon the relative absence of the public intellectual from the long-term tradition of British culture (over the course of around 100 years), in contrast to another culture such as the French or 19th-century Russia (though as Collini himself notes, these comparisons are often highly questionable, with an outside perception of French intellectualism being countered by many French people looking at the situation from their own viewpoint).

At the beginning Collini asserts clearly that the concept of intellectualism is in itself enormously complex, and that any word such as that contains a multiplicity of meanings depending on what set of signifiers it is connected to. In this sense he explores the roots of the term itself, tracing them to their evolution into the English language from its origins in French in the nineteenth century and beyond.

Perhaps the most striking aspect of the meanings with which the term is associated relates to the question of the value judgments applied as a corollary of them. The work explores the notion of the repudiation of the very concept of public intellectualism by certain key figures who might in fact be seen as exemplars of intellectualism such as T. S. Eliot, G. M. Trevelyan, Bertrand Russell, R. G. Collingwood, George Orwell, A. J. P. Taylor, and A. J. Ayer. Collini refers to this as a "paradox of denial" and analyses why such a situation should have arisen in the first place. In part, again, this has its roots in history: one aspect of the British antipathy to the overly abstract or theoretical is the patrimony of the French Revolution which was seen by many across the English Channel as being a phenomenon which was too abstract (driven by a discourse of the Rights of Man, for instance) in a way which led to a suspect gulf between rhetoric and reality. Orwell in particular might be seen as the apogee of the curious mixture of intellectualism and anti-intellectualism that has been a hallmark of some of the greatest thinkers in British culture; people who are attracted to the realm of ideas and work well within it but at the same time are suspicious of abstract thinking that is not rooted in the empirical and the everyday.

The book ends on an arguably optimistic note, asserting that despite the prevalence of celebrity culture and certain forms of superficiality in public life and discourse, there remains an urgent need (and possible supply) of public intellectualism, noting that there is a role for "issues of common interest [that are] considered in ways that are... more reflective or more analytical, better informed or better expressed".

Overall it is argued that intellectualism is likely to be an important force in public life in the 21st century, though in British and Anglophone culture it might not always be referred to with such an appellation.

== See also ==
- Anti-intellectual
- Intellectual
- Public humanities
