= A Hanging =

Essay by George Orwell

"A Hanging" (1931) is a short essay written by George Orwell, first published (under his real name) in August 1931 in the John Middleton Murry’s British literary magazine The Adelphi and then reprinted in 1946 in the British literary magazine The New Savoy. Set in Burma, where Orwell (under his real name of Eric Arthur Blair) had served in the British Imperial Police from 1922 to 1927, it describes the execution of a criminal.

== The story ==
The condemned man is given no name, nor is it explained what crime he has committed. For the British police who supervise his execution, the hanging is an unpleasant but routine piece of business. The narrator takes no active part in the hanging, and appears to be less experienced than his colleagues. As the handcuffed prisoner is marched to the gallows he steps slightly aside to avoid treading in a puddle of rainwater; the narrator sees this, and reflects:

It is curious, but till that moment I had never realised what it means to destroy a healthy, conscious man. When I saw the prisoner step aside to avoid the puddle I saw the mystery, the unspeakable wrongness, of cutting a life short when it is in full tide. This man was not dying, he was alive just as we are alive. All the organs of his body were working—bowels digesting food, skin renewing itself, nails growing, tissues forming—all toiling away in solemn foolery. His nails would still be growing when he stood on the drop, when he was falling through the air with a tenth of a second to live. His eyes saw the yellow gravel and the grey walls, and his brain still remembered, foresaw, reasoned—even about puddles. He and we were a party of men walking together, seeing, hearing, feeling, understanding the same world; and in two minutes, with a sudden snap, one of us would be gone—one mind less, one world less.

The hanging is carried out, and all concerned feel a sudden relief as they leave the scene where the dead man still hangs.

== Context ==
Britain conquered Burma over 62 years (1824–86), during which three Anglo-Burmese Wars were fought, and incorporated it into its Indian Empire. Britain administered Burma as an Indian province until 1937, when it became a separate, self-governing colony. Burma attained independence in 1948.

== Veracity ==
When asked about "A Hanging", Orwell was unwilling to discuss the subject, and once said that it was "only a story." No known evidence shows specifically where and when he witnessed an execution during his time in Burma. In his writings, however, he repeated that he had done so. He further reflected upon hanging in his "As I Please" column for Tribune, 15 November 1946. According to Dennis Collings, a friend of Orwell from 1921, when his father became the Blair (Orwell) family doctor, it was certain Orwell would have witnessed a hanging, and that policemen had to see a hanging, "as a kind of initiation. There had to be police officers present at executions—and cadets were assigned to that kind of thing."

== See also ==
- George Orwell bibliography
- Danny Deever - Kipling's poem of a military hanging in India; later critiqued by Orwell
