= Polemic (magazine) =

Defunct British arts magazine

Polemic was a British "Magazine of Philosophy, Psychology, and Aesthetics" published between 1945 and 1947, which aimed to be a general or non-specialist intellectual periodical.

Edited by the ex-Communist Humphrey Slater, it was "sympathetic to science, hostile to the intellectual manifestations of romanticism, and markedly anti-Communist. Eight issues were published. The first, published as a book to get round the prohibition of new journals imposed by war-time paper rationing, included contributions by Henry Miller, Bertrand Russell, A. J. Ayer, Stephen Spender, Stephen Glover, George Orwell, C. E. M. Joad and Rupert Crawshay-Williams.

Orwell contributed five essays over the life of the magazine and Russell and Ayer contributed four each. Other contributors included Philip Toynbee, Hugh Trevor-Roper, Dylan Thomas, Diana Witherby, Stuart Hampshire, Geoffrey Grigson, Ben Nicholson, Adrian Stokes, J. D. Bernal C. H. Waddington and John Wisdom.

== Orwell's essays ==
- "Notes on Nationalism" (Polemic, No 1 – October 1945 – written in May 1945)
- "The Prevention of Literature" (Polemic, No 2 – January 1946)
- "Second Thoughts on James Burnham" (Polemic, No 3 – May 1946)
- "Politics vs. Literature: An Examination of Gulliver's Travels" (Polemic, No 5 – September–October 1946)
- "Lear, Tolstoy and the Fool" (Polemic, No 7)
- Orwell also contributed an (unsigned) editorial to (Polemic, No 3 – May 1946)

== Ayer's essays ==
- 'Deistic Fallacies', Polemic, no. 1. (1945)
- 'Secret Session' (on J.-P. Sartre), Polemic, no. 2, pp. 60~63. (1945)
- 'Freedom and Necessity', Polemic, no. 5, pp. 36~44. (1946) (repr. in Philosophical Essays, 1954]
- "The Claims of Philosophy", in Polemic, no. 7, pp. 18~33 (1947) [repr. in Reflections on Our Age, 1949)

== See also ==
- Bibliography of George Orwell
