= Some Thoughts on the Common Toad =

1946 essay by George Orwell

"Some Thoughts on the Common Toad" is an essay published in 1946 by the English author George Orwell. It is a eulogy in favour of spring.

The essay first appeared in Tribune on the 12 April 1946, and was reprinted in The New Republic of 20 May 1946. An abridged version, "The Humble Toad", appeared in World Digest in March 1947.

== Background ==
Orwell loved the natural world from his childhood, when he rambled in the fields around Henley-on-Thames and on the South Downs at Eastbourne, Sussex. His letters and diaries reveal his careful observation of the nature surrounding him and of field expeditions throughout his life, even when he was in Catalonia or at the sanatorium in Kent in 1938.

Orwell had been disappointed by earlier letters of complaint to Tribune when he ventured into nature-related topics, instead of hard politics. An "As I Please" article published on 21 January 1944 that referred to rambler roses that he had planted at the cottage in which he had lived before the war had brought correspondence criticising his bourgeois nostalgia.

== Summary ==
Orwell describes the emergence from hibernation of the common toad and its procreative cycle and offers it as an alternative to the skylark and primrose as a less-conventional example of the coming of spring. Orwell points out that the pleasures of spring are available to everybody, cost nothing and can be appreciated in the town as much as the country.

However, Orwell is concerned with feelings in some groups that there is something reprehensible in enjoying nature. For the politically discontent, groaning under the capitalist system, the love of nature seems sentimental. The insistently modern, for their part, seem to see the appreciation of nature as reactionary in a machine age. Orwell dismisses those ideas and argues that retaining a childhood love of nature makes a peaceful and decent future more likely.

== Extracts ==
How many times have I stood watching the toads mating, or a pair of hares having a boxing match in the young corn, and thought of all the important persons who would stop me enjoying this if they could. But luckily they can't.... The atom bombs are piling up in the factories, the police are prowling through the cities, the lies are streaming from the loudspeakers, but the earth is still going round the sun, and neither the dictators nor the bureaucrats, deeply as they disapprove of the process, are able to prevent it.

== Reactions ==
The article prompted an appreciative letter from John Betjeman on April 18, 1946 that said, "I have always thought you were one of the best living writers of prose," He praised Orwell that he had "enjoyed and echoed every sentiment" of his thoughts on the common toad.

== See also ==
- Essays of George Orwell
- George Orwell bibliography
