= Shooting an Elephant =

1936 essay by George Orwell

- Essay by George Orwell
- Cover of first anthology publication
- Country: United Kingdom
- Genre: Unknown whether fiction or non-fiction

Publication
- Published in: New Writing
- Publication date: 1936

"Shooting an Elephant" is an essay by British writer George Orwell, first published in the literary magazine New Writing in late 1936 and broadcast by the BBC Home Service on 12 October 1948.

The essay describes the experience of the English narrator, possibly Orwell himself, called upon to shoot an aggressive elephant while working as a police officer in Burma. Because the locals expect him to do the job, he does so against his better judgment, his anguish increased by the elephant's slow and painful death. The story is regarded as a metaphor for colonialism as a whole, and for Orwell's view that "when the white man turns tyrant it is his own freedom that he destroys".

Orwell spent some of his life in Burma (present-day Myanmar) in a position akin to that of the narrator (he was posted as a police officer in 1926 in Mawlamyine, which is the setting of the essay), but the degree to which his account is autobiographical is disputed, with no conclusive evidence to prove it to be fact or fiction. After his death in 1950, the essay was republished several times, including in Shooting an Elephant and Other Essays (1950), Inside the Whale and Other Essays (1957), and Selected Writings (1958).

In a 2022 interview, Orwell's son Richard Blair said he thinks "Shooting an Elephant" is one of his father's two best essays, together with "A Hanging".

== Context ==
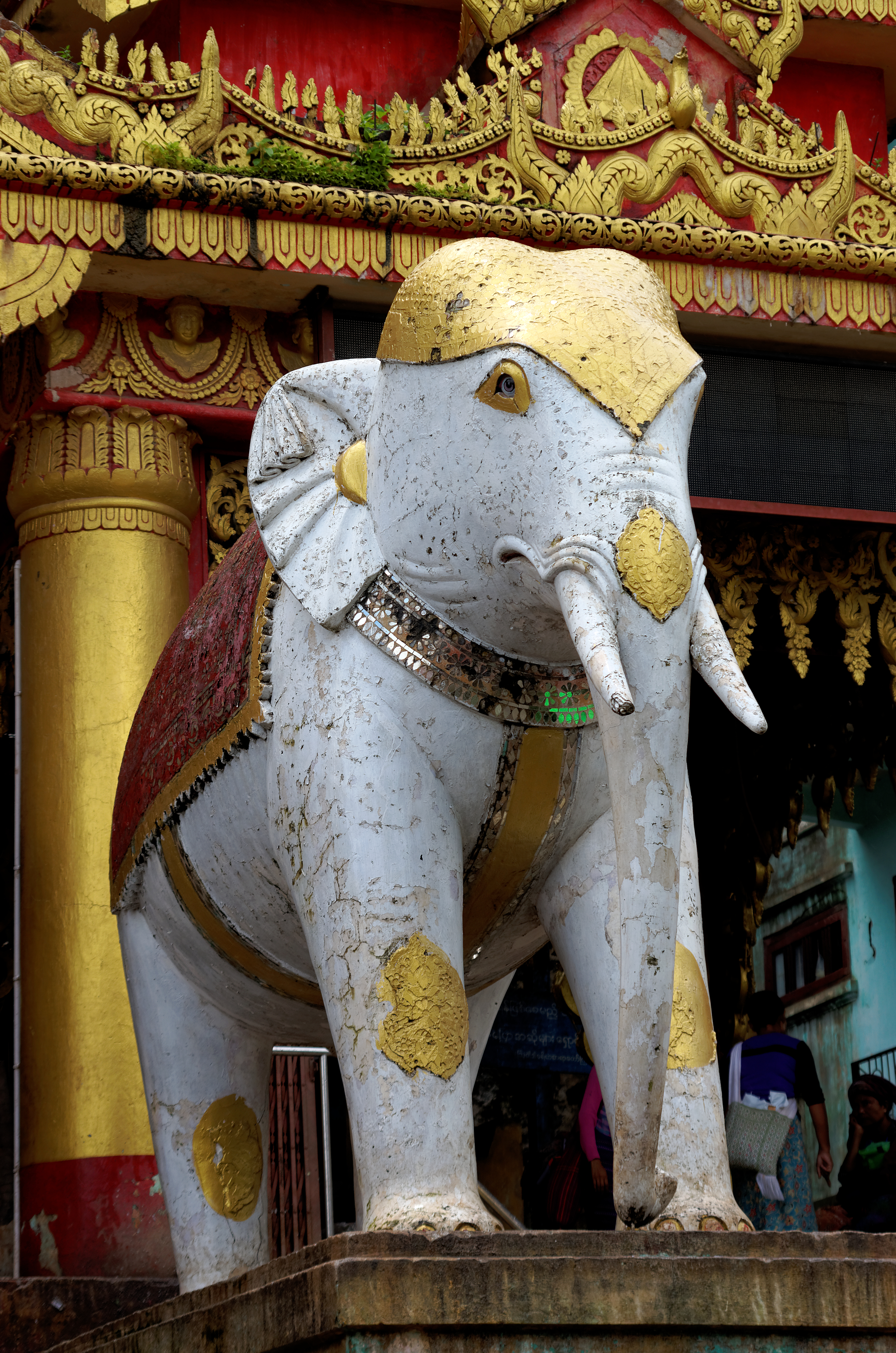
White elephants have been venerated in Buddhist Burma for centuries, such as this one at an entrance to a temple.

The British Empire gradually annexed Burma over a period of 63 years (1823–1886) during which three Anglo-Burmese Wars took place, and Britain incorporated it into British India. It was administered as a province of India until 1937, when it became a separate, self-governing colony, attaining its independence on 4 January 1948. With a strong interest in the lives of the working class, Orwell, born in India to a middle-class family but brought up in Britain, held the post of assistant superintendent in the British Indian Imperial Police in Burma from 1922 to 1927.

"Moulmein used to be full of elephants" employed to haul logs in the timber firms. "Ordinary tamed elephants have been part of Burmese life for centuries,... the rare and revered white elephant, is believed in Buddhist legend to be a symbol of purity and power". When Orwell moved to Moulmein, in 1926, "he was most probably ambivalent about the colonial state of which he was a part. The Kipling-inspired romance of the Raj had been worn thin by the daily realities of his job in which... he witnessed 'the dirty work of Empire at close quarters'". Orwell writes how he was trapped between his own resentment towards the empire and the Burmese people's resentment towards him. As a member of the ruling power, he is cornered into doing what the "natives" expect of him: "He wears a mask, and his face grows to fit it".

== Events ==
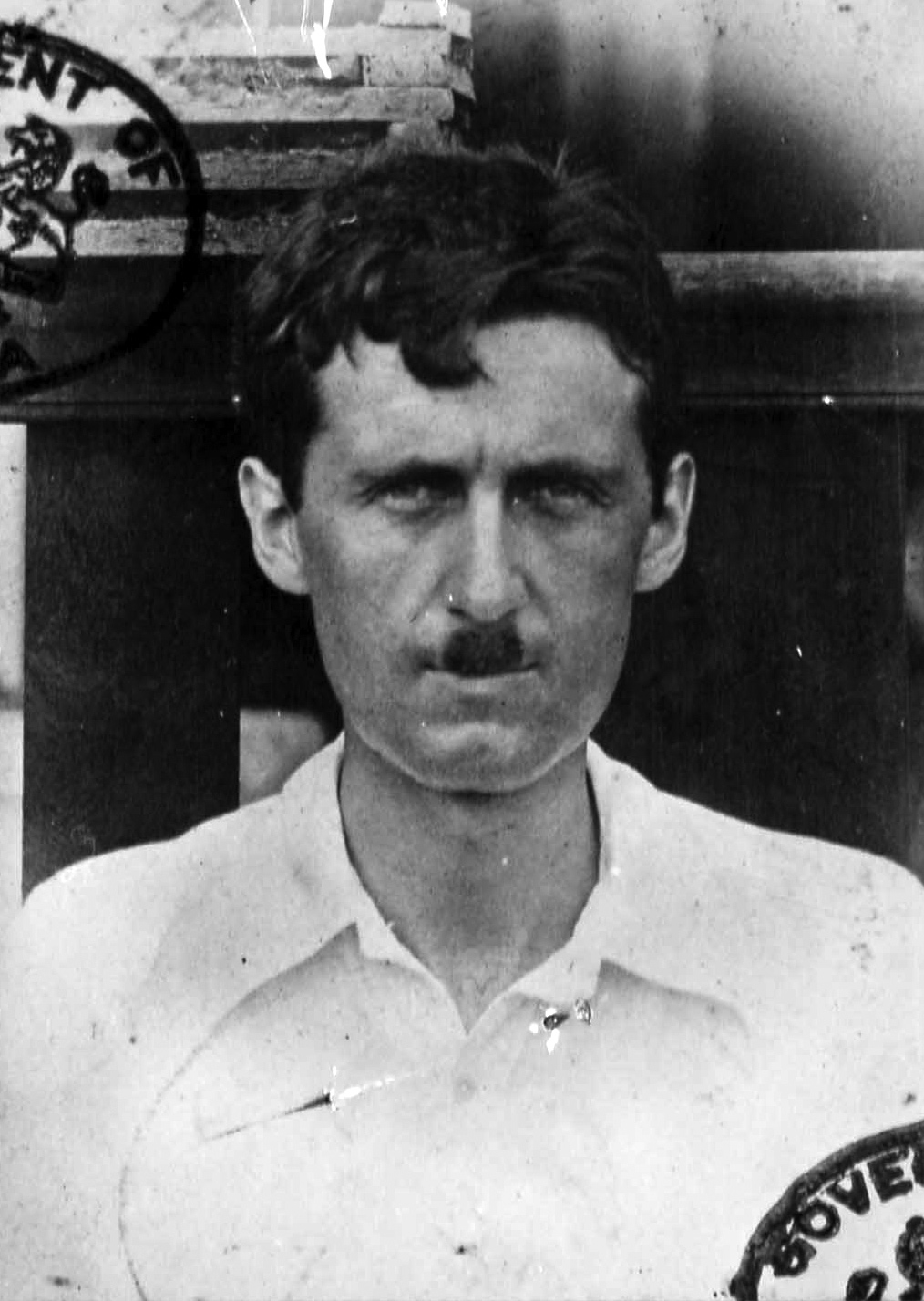
A passport photo of Orwell, taken during his time in the Burmese police force

The narrator of the essay is a police officer serving in Moulmein during a period of intense anti-European sentiment. Although his intellectual sympathies lie with the Burmese, his official role makes him a symbol of the oppressive imperial power. As such, he is subjected to constant baiting and jeering by the local people.

After receiving a call regarding a normally tame elephant's rampage, the narrator, armed with a .44 caliber Winchester rifle and riding on a pony, goes to the town in which the elephant has been seen. Entering one of the poorest quarters, he receives conflicting reports and contemplates leaving since he thinks that the incident is a hoax. The narrator then sees a village woman chasing away children who are looking at the corpse of an Indian, whom the elephant has trampled and killed. He sends an order to bring an elephant rifle and, followed by a group of roughly a few thousand people, heads toward the paddy field in which the elephant has rested in its tracks.

Although he does not want to kill the elephant since it now seems peaceful, the narrator feels pressured by the demand of the crowd for the act to be carried out. After inquiring as to the elephant's behaviour and delaying for some time, he shoots the elephant several times and wounds it but is unable to kill it. The narrator then leaves the beast since he is unable to be in its presence as it continues to suffer. He later learns that it was stripped, nearly to the bone, within hours. His elderly colleagues agree that killing the elephant was the best thing to do, but the younger ones believe that it was worth more than the Indian whom it killed. The narrator then wonders if they will ever understand that he shot it "solely to avoid looking a fool".

== Themes ==
=== Imperialism ===
An anti-imperialist writer, Orwell promoted the idea that through imperialism, both conqueror and conquered were destroyed. Orwell clearly states his displeasure with the British Empire: "I had already made up my mind that imperialism was an evil thing.... I was all for the Burmese and all against their oppressors, the British". The narrator perceives that the conqueror is not in control, but it is rather the will of the conquered that governs his actions. As ruler, he notes that it is his duty to appear resolute, with his word being final:

I perceived in this moment that when the white man turns tyrant it is his own freedom that he destroys. He becomes a sort of hollow, posing dummy, the conventionalized figure of a sahib. For it is the condition of his rule that he shall spend his life in trying to impress the "natives," and so in every crisis he has got to do what the "natives" expect of him. He wears a mask, and his face grows to fit it. I had got to shoot the elephant. I had committed myself to doing it when I sent for the rifle. A sahib has got to act like a sahib; he has got to appear resolute, to know his own mind and do definite things. To come all that way, rifle in hand, with two thousand people marching at my heels, and then to trail feebly away, having done nothing — no, that was impossible. The crowd would laugh at me. And my whole life, every white man's life in the East, was one long struggle not to be laughed at.

Although it is not the narrator's wish to shoot the elephant, his will is not his own and their expectation makes him realise that he must shoot the elephant: "I was only an absurd puppet pushed to and fro by the will of those yellow faces behind". Reflectively, the narrator realises being forced to impose strict laws and to shoot the elephant. He states his feelings against the act but submits after comprehending he "had got to shoot the elephant"—illustrates an inherent problem of hegemony: "when the white man turns tyrant it is his own freedom that he destroys". By enforcing British colonial rule, he is both forfeiting his freedom and oppressing the Burmese.

=== Conqueror and conquered ===
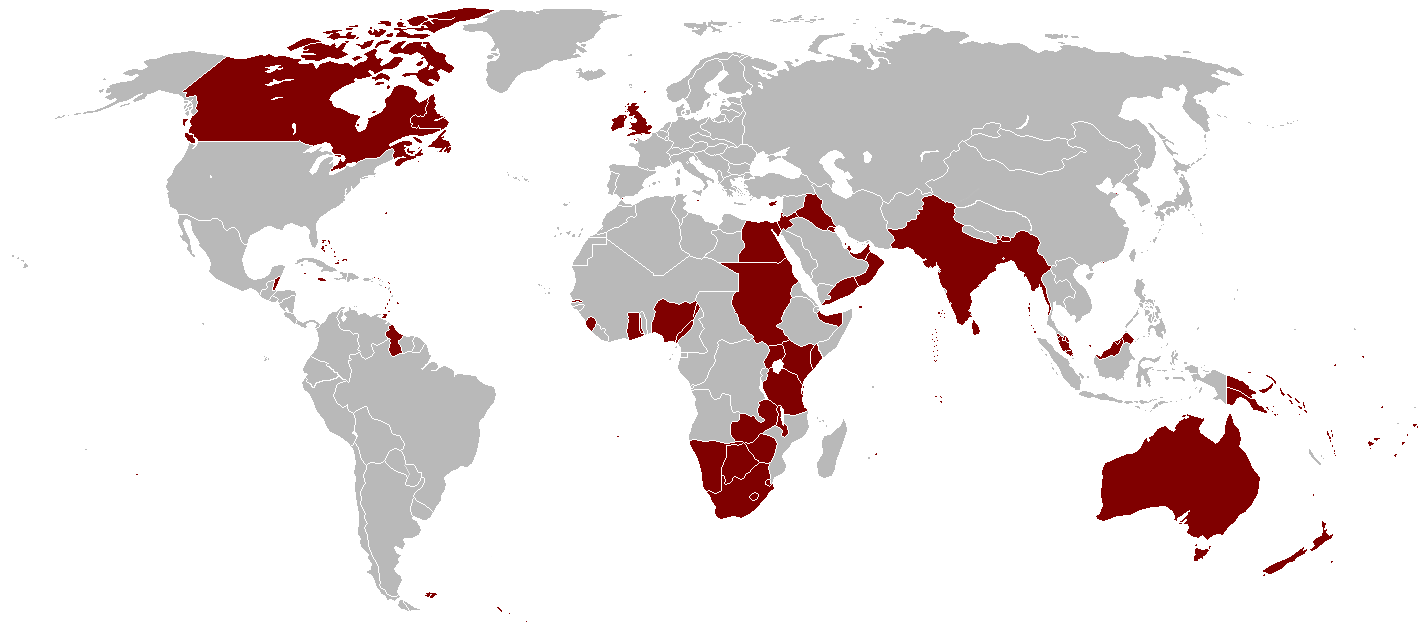
The British Empire at its height, 1921

The narrator's situation throughout the essay is one of little prospect or prominence. He comments on how even though he is a member of the ruling class, he finds himself either largely ignored by the Burmese people or hated. He remarks in the first sentence, "I was hated by large numbers of people—the only time in my life that I have been important enough for this to happen to me". Only with the expectation of a killing do the locals find him "momentarily worth watching". He describes how, as a police officer, he was often a target for mockery from the locals, as was any other European who provided an easy target.

Orwell recalled he faced hostility from the Burmese, "in the end the sneering yellow faces of young men that met me everywhere, the insults hooted after me when I was at a safe distance, got badly on my nerves". He recalled that "I was stuck between my hatred of the empire I served and my rage against the evil-spirited little beasts who tried to make my job impossible".

In contrast to his description of the natives as "little beasts", the narrator labels the elephant as a "great beast" and suggests that he holds it at a higher status than the locals. That is somewhat paradoxical, however, as the narrator's own job is demeaning and forces him to see "the dirty work of the Empire at close quarters". The narrator singles out "young Buddhist priests" to be "the worst of all" and comments on how he would gladly "drive a bayonet into a Buddhist priest's guts".

Having killed the elephant, the narrator considers how he was glad that it killed the "coolie", as that gave him full legal backing. The essay finishes with him wondering if they will even understand his motive for having killed the elephant, as he merely wishes to salvage his pride.

=== Conscience ===
The narrator's conscience plagues him greatly as he finds himself trapped between the "hatred of the empire [he] served" and his "rage against the evil-spirited little beasts who tried to make [his] job impossible". He claims that he is "all for the Burmese and all against the British" and goes on to say that "feelings like these are the normal by-products of imperialism; ask any Anglo-Indian official, if you can catch him off duty". That creates a sense of empathy from the conquerors towards the conquered, but as they treat their conquerors badly, the conquerors start to feel less guilty and so treat them badly once more.

== Film adaptation ==
Shooting an Elephant
- Directed by: Juan Pablo Rothie
- Written by: Alec Sokolow
- Starring: Barry Sloane; David Kaye
- Music by: Greg Kuehn
- Release date: April 16, 2016 (Tribeca Film Festival)
- Running time: 11 minutes
- Country: United States/United Kingdom
- Language: English

"Shooting an Elephant" was adapted into a short film by director Juan Pablo Rothie and Academy Award-nominated writer Alec Sokolow. The film was shot entirely on location in Nepal starring Barry Sloane as Orwell and David Kaye narrating. The film was released on 16 April 2016 at the Tribeca Film Festival in the United States.

== Fictionality ==
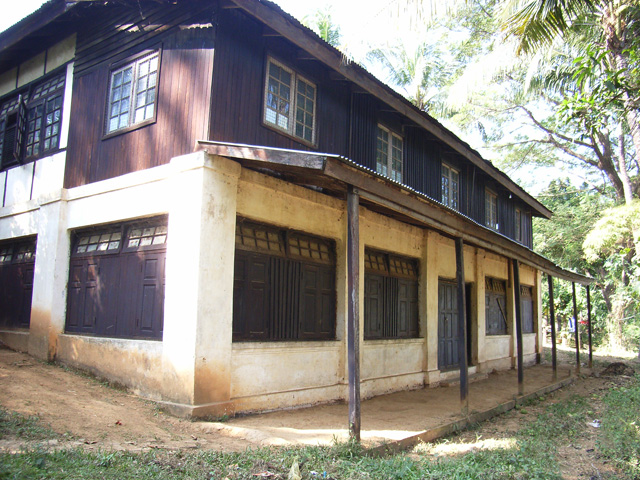
The British Club building in Kathar, pictured in 2006 (Only the ground floor existed when Orwell was there.)

The degree to which the story is fiction has been disputed. In his biography of Orwell, George Orwell: A Life, Bernard Crick cast doubt on the idea that Orwell himself actually shot an elephant. No independent account of Orwell's actions has been found, and there was no official record of the incident, which was unusual because of the destruction of valuable property.

Peter Davison, the editor of Orwell's Complete Works, includes an interview with George Stuart, a contemporary of Orwell in Burma, who said that Orwell was transferred to Kathar as punishment for shooting an elephant. "An elephant was considered a valuable asset to any timber firm... and Orwell would have been severely reprimanded for such unnecessary slaughter. It was not long after the incident that he was transferred from Moulmein to a quiet post in Upper Burma called Katha". Davison also includes in the complete works a news item from the Rangoon Gazette, March 22, 1926, which describes a Major E. C. Kenny shooting an elephant in similar circumstances. When one biographer questioned Orwell's wife, Sonia Brownell, she replied, "Of course he shot a f--king a [sic] elephant. He said he did. Why do you always doubt his word!"

== See also ==
- Burmese Days
- Chunee
- George Orwell bibliography
- Such, Such Were the Joys
