= Lear, Tolstoy and the Fool =

1947 essay by George Orwell

"Lear, Tolstoy and the Fool" is an essay by George Orwell. It was inspired by a critical essay on Shakespeare by Leo Tolstoy, and was first published in Polemic No. 7 (March 1947).

Orwell analyses Tolstoy's criticism of Shakespeare's work in general and his attack on King Lear in particular. According to Orwell's detailed summary, Tolstoy denounced Shakespeare as a bad dramatist, not a true artist at all, and declared that Shakespeare's fame was due to propaganda by German professors towards the end of the eighteenth century. Tolstoy claimed that Shakespeare was still admired only because of a sort of mass hypnosis or "epidemic suggestion".

After having recapitulated Tolstoy's indictment and Tolstoy's criteria for literary merit, which Shakespeare does not meet, Orwell writes:

One's first feeling is that in describing Shakespeare as a bad writer he is saying something demonstrably untrue. But this is not the case. In reality there is no kind of evidence or argument by which one can show that Shakespeare, or any other writer, is 'good' ... Ultimately there is no test of literary merit except survival, which is itself an index to majority opinion. Artistic theories such as Tolstoy's are quite worthless, because they not only start out with arbitrary assumptions, but depend on vague terms ('sincere', 'important' and so forth) which can be interpreted in any way one chooses. Properly speaking one cannot answer Tolstoy's attack. The interesting question is: why did he make it? But it should be noticed in passing that he uses many weak or dishonest arguments. Some of them are worth pointing out, not because they invalidate his main charge but because they are, so to speak, evidence of malice.

After a detailed, itemised analysis aimed to show that a great number of Tolstoy's arguments are false, dishonest and malicious, Orwell identifies Tolstoy's chief quarrel with Shakespeare as "the quarrel between the religious and the humanist attitude towards life." The exuberance with life that characterises Shakespeare, his interest in everything, the poetic brilliance – the very qualities for which people tend to admire Shakespeare – are precisely the qualities that make him unendurable to Tolstoy, who preached austerity and whose "main aim, in his later years, was to narrow the range of human consciousness. One's interests, one's points of attachment to the physical world and the day-to-day struggle, must be as few and not as many as possible." Since Shakespeare's attitude to life threatens Tolstoy's, Tolstoy is incapable of enjoying Shakespeare and mounts an assault on him in order to try to ensure that others cannot enjoy him either.

Orwell then proceeds to examine Tolstoy himself and notes that the special hatred Tolstoy reserved for King Lear could well be due to the curious similarity of his own story to Lear's, and to the fact that he suffered disappointments of the same nature after renouncing his estate, his aristocratic title and his copyrights.

In conclusion, Orwell mentions how little difference Tolstoy's thunderous attack on Shakespeare has made. According to Orwell, the only criterion for the merit of a work of art is that it continues to be admired, and hence, the verdict on Shakespeare must be "not guilty", since more than a hundred years after Tolstoy's pamphlet Shakespeare remains as admired as ever.
