= The Prevention of Literature =

Essay by George Orwell

"The Prevention of Literature" is an essay published in 1946 by the English author George Orwell. The essay is concerned with freedom of thought and expression, particularly in an environment where the prevailing orthodoxy in left-wing intellectual circles is in favour of the communism of the Soviet Union.

== Background ==
Orwell reviewed Freedom of Expression, published by PEN, which had appeared in the 12 October 1945 issue of Tribune.

In his essay Orwell recalls attending a PEN meeting a year previously on the tercentenary of John Milton's Areopagitica which included the phrase "killing a book".

The essay first appeared in Polemic No 2 in January 1946.

== Summary ==
Orwell introduces his essay by recalling a meeting of the PEN Club, held on the 300-year anniversary of Milton's Areopagitica in defence of freedom of the press, in which the speakers appeared to be interested primarily in issues of obscenity and in presenting eulogies of Soviet Russia and concludes that it was really a demonstration in favour of censorship. (In a footnote he acknowledges that he probably picked a bad day) The talk serves as a pretext for Orwell to discuss attacks on freedom of thought and the enemies of intellectual liberty. He declares the immediate enemies of freedom of thought in England to be the concentration of the press in a few hands, monopoly of radio, bureaucracy and the unwillingness of the public to buy books. However, he is more concerned with the independence of writers being undermined by those who should be its defenders. What is at issue is the right to report contemporary events truthfully. He notes that 15 years previously, it had been necessary to defend freedom against Conservatives and Catholics, but now it was necessary to defend it against Communists and fellow-travellers declaring that there is "no doubt about the poisonous effect of the Russian mythos on English intellectual life".

Orwell cites the Ukrainian famine, the Spanish Civil War and Poland as topics that the pro-Soviet writers fail to address because of the prevailing orthodoxy, and sees organised lying as integral to totalitarian states. Orwell notes that prose literature is unable to flourish under totalitarianism just as it was unable to flourish under the oppressive religious culture of the Middle Ages. However, there is a difference which is that under totalitarianism the doctrines are unstable, so that the lies always have to change to keep up with a continual re-writing of the past. This is leading to an age of schizophrenia rather than an age of faith.

Orwell suggests that, for various reasons, poetry can survive under totalitarianism, whereas prose writers are crippled by the destruction of intellectual liberty. Speculating on the type of literature under a future totalitarian society Orwell predicts this to be formulaic and low grade sensationalism, but notes that one factor is that general populace is not prepared to spend as much on literature as on other recreations. In criticising the Russophile intelligentsia, Orwell complains of the uncritical and indifferent attitude of scientists, who anyway have a privileged place under totalitarian states. For Orwell, literature is doomed if liberty of thought perishes, but the direct attack on intellectuals is coming from intellectuals themselves.

== Excerpts ==
In our age the idea of intellectual liberty is under attack from two directions. On the one side are its theoretical enemies, the apologists of totalitarianism, and on the other its immediate, practical enemies, monopoly and bureaucracy. Any writer or journalist who wants to retain his integrity finds himself thwarted by the general drift of society rather than by active persecution.

The journalist is unfree, and is conscious of unfreedom, when he is forced to write lies or suppress what seems to him important news: the imaginative writer is unfree when he has to falsify his subjective feelings, which from his point of view are facts. He may distort and caricature reality in order to make his meaning clearer, but he cannot misrepresent the scenery of his own mind.

Political writing in our time consists almost entirely of prefabricated phrases bolted together like the pieces of a child's Meccano set. It is the unavoidable result of self-censorship. To write in plain vigorous language one has to think fearlessly, and if one thinks fearlessly one cannot be politically orthodox.

== Reactions ==
Randall Swingler, a communist poet, responded to the essay in an article "The Right to Free Expression" in Polemic 5. Swingler did not disagree that a writer must stand against the enemies of intellectual liberty nor with Orwell's case against the totalitarian cultural policies of the Soviet Union. His complaint was that it was impossible to reply to Orwell's essay because it was pitched at a level of "intellectual swashbucklery", persuasive generalisation and unsupported assertion. Orwell had a marginal column in which he responded to what he saw as a personal attack with sarcastic comments. After this exchange, Orwell was reported to be very angry indeed when approached by Swingler and refused to shake his hand, and took care to avoid running into him in pubs.

Christopher Sykes reviewed this and other Orwell essays and concluded "They contain much admirable sense, but they contain too some over-stated views, and some prophecies as doubtful as those of John Burnham".

== See also ==
- Bibliography of George Orwell
