= As I Please =

Series of articles written by George Orwell

"As I Please" was a series of articles written between 1943 and 1947 for the British left-wing newspaper Tribune by author and journalist George Orwell.

On resigning from his job at the BBC in November 1943, Orwell joined Tribune as literary editor. Over the next three-and-a-half years he wrote a series of columns, under the title "As I Please", that remain some of the greatest examples of their genre in the English language. The articles allowed Orwell to digress freely over whatever topics came into his mind, including reminiscences, nature observations, gleanings from books and thoughts on the political situation. Each article roamed from one theme to another without any need for formal continuity but had no title indicating the content.

The first article appeared in December 1943 and considered prevailing attitude to American servicemen in Britain. The last, in April 1947, covered the publication of social surveys by the Mass Observation research group, venereal diseases and begins the concluding section "For the last five minutes I have been gazing out of the window into the square, keeping a sharp look-out for first signs of spring".

== Topics ==
Incomplete list

31 December 1943

- War guilt

7 January 1944

- New Year's honours

4 February 1944

- Objective truth in history (History is written by the winners.)

25 February 1944

- New ideas and progress

24 March 1944

- What is Fascism?

14 April 1944

- Declining birthrates, decaying belief in an afterlife

5 May 1944

- Literary criticism

12 May 1944

- Travel, economic self-sufficiency

19 May 1944

- Killing of civilians in war, conspiracy theories

1 September 1944

- The appeasement of the Leftist press towards the Soviet Union

8 November 1946

- American fashion magazines, road safety campaigns, bread rationing

15 November 1946

- Popular feeling against foreign immigration, slow hanging of war criminals

22 November 1946

- Newspapers ranked by "Intelligence" and "Popularity"

29 November 1946

- "Bad News" stories in newspapers, shortage of watches and clocks, return of the Jews to Palestine

6 December 1946

- Antisemitic tone in Trilby by George du Maurier, recommendation of middle-age retirement for writers (H. G. Wells), printing of four-letter words

13 December 1946

- UNO and other international conferences, issues of national sovereignty

20 December 1946

- Christmas - in praise of indulgence and conviviality in disregard for vegetarians and teetotallers.

27 December 1946

- How modern knowledge has to depend on authority rather than reasoning, Laski's libel case, disgusting American 'comics'

3 January 1947

- On a liner to Burma when a quartermaster scavenges a custard pie, literary purge in the USSR and expulsion of writers from the Writer's Union, thoughts of Marcus Aurelius as an incentive to getting up in the morning

17 January 1947

- Flawed report in the Daily Herald on Indians who broadcast on Nazi radio, In Darkest Germany post-war starvation in Germany, dogs over-indulged at Christmas, stupid expressions

24 January 1947

- Scottish businessmen and their attitudes to Polish refugees, Petain at Foch's funeral and Queen Mary in Windsor

31 January 1947 (As I Pleased)

- Personal experiences of Tribune as a reader, writer and observer

7 February 1947

- The need for a good D-I-Y guide. dirtiness of snow, Burmese independence and the problem of autonomy of minority groups within minority groups, misprints by H. G. Wells and his lack of self-criticism

14 February 1947

- Scottish Nationalism as a form of race-hatred, the case for keeping the Gaelic language alive, political content in a commercial circular letter from a whisky distiller, amusing epitaphs

7 March 1947

- The need for an improved anthology of modern English poetry

14 March 1947

- Simplifying English spelling and traditional imperial units, food parcel confiscations, an experience in teaching history

28 March 1947

- "Mass Observation", social surveys and the financial determination of what is surveyed, venereal diseases, the first signs of spring

== See also ==
- Bibliography of George Orwell
