= Poltronesofà UK =

Furniture retailer based in Northern England

poltronesofà UK
- Type: Private limited company
- Traded as: LSE: SCS (2015–2024)
- ISIN: GB00BRF0TJ56
- Industry: Retail
- Predecessor: Suite Centres Sunderland
- Founded: 1894; 132 years ago
- Headquarters: Sunderland, Tyne and Wear, United Kingdom
- Area served: United Kingdom
- Key people: Renzo Ricci (Founder & Owner, Poltronesofà); Cristian Biasoni (Group CEO, Poltronesofà); Mike Schmidt (CEO, Poltronesofà UK)
- Products: Furniture
- Revenue: ▲£317.4 million (2019)
- Operating income: ▲£14.3 million (2019)
- Net income: ▲£11.3 million (2019)
- Number of employees: 1,829
- Parent: Poltronesofà
- Website: www.poltronesofa.co.uk

poltronesofà UK, formerly ScS, is a home furnishings retailer in the United Kingdom, specialising in sofas. It has been owned by the Italian furniture group Poltronesofà since 2024, and its UK stores were rebranded from ScS to poltronesofà in March 2026.

== History ==
ScS was established in Sunderland, Tyne and Wear in 1894, as a family owned home furnishings store. By the 1980s, there were eight ScS stores in the North East of England. In 1993, a management buy out enabled the business to expand out of the region, and become a prominent upholstered furniture retailer throughout the United Kingdom, with a focus on gaining presence in large retail parks.

As part of the company's growth strategy, in 1997, the business was listed on the Official List and, as ScS Upholstery plc, was admitted to trading on the London Stock Exchange’s main market for listed securities. Over the following ten years, the number of ScS stores grew to 95, supported by nine distribution centres.

=== 2007–2008: Impact of economic downturn ===
The ScS brand was adversely affected by the economic downturn in 2007 and 2008. Constraints on consumer lending and reduced disposable incomes saw a decrease in demand for ‘big-ticket’ items such as large home furnishings, manifesting in trading difficulties for ScS and pressure upon financial resources.

This was compounded by the withdrawal of credit insurance that had covered suppliers against ScS’ debt to them, and in 2008, ScS collapsed into administration. In order to generate a significant cash investment, both immediate and long term, ScS was sold to Sun Capital Partners in July 2008. Under new ownership, ScS increased their share of the upholstered furniture market from 5% in 2009 to 7.9% in 2013.

=== 2011: Expansion of interest free credit ===
In 2011, ScS expanded their four years interest free credit offering to include all of their products.

This year also saw a change of products being offered, as carpets were also added to their core range

=== 2014: Partnership with House of Fraser ===
In May 2014, a pilot partnership with United Kingdom department store chain House of Fraser commenced, with ScS concessions opening in three stores in the North East of England. Following its success, the concessions were rolled out at a further thirty six House of Fraser stores, under their ‘For Living’ brand during 2014. The House of Fraser For Living website was launched in September 2014.

In November 2018, this arrangement was discontinued, due to House of Fraser going into administration. They pulled out of the stores on 16 January 2019.

=== 2015: Return to Stock Market ===
In January 2015, ScS returned to the stock market, with an opening price of 185p a share. The stock market return was directed by Alan Smith, former chief executive of Somerfield.

ScS had 101 stores located in England, Scotland and Wales, in addition to an online store, first available in 2009, but relaunched in July 2014.

=== 2024: Poltronesofà takeover ===
In October 2023, ScS accepted a £99.4 million cash offer from the Italian upholstery group Poltronesofà. The acquisition was approved by ScS shareholders in December 2023 and completed in January 2024, after which ScS delisted from the London Stock Exchange.

Poltronesofà stated it had acquired ScS to enter a key market and support the next stage of its development, providing the capital needed to accelerate its ambitions.

A large scale refurbishment programme of stores began following the take over, with the group investing around £57 million in redesigning the UK estate. The takeover was followed by a series of senior departures at ScS, including chief executive Steve Carson, and in October 2024 Poltronesofà appointed Cristian Biasoni as group chief executive.

=== 2026: Rebrand to poltronesofà ===
On 9 March 2026, Mike Schmidt, formerly a finance director at DFS and B&M, was appointed chief executive of Poltronesofà's UK division.

On 12 March 2026, all 97 UK stores relaunched under the poltronesofà brand, initially trading as "poltronesofà at ScS" to have a smooth transition to the other brand, completing the transition of the UK business from ScS to poltronesofà. The relaunch followed the £57 million programme to redesign the store estate around the group's Italian-inspired sofa and armchair collections.

== Products ==
=== Expansion of product range and rebranding ===
In 2010, the ScS product range was expanded beyond upholstered furniture, to include dining and occasional furniture. The ScS product range was further expanded in 2012 to include flooring. The additions of these new products catalysed the rebranding of ScS as ‘Sofa Carpet Specialist’.

=== Third party products ===
Until 2009, with the addition of La-Z-Boy products to the range, ScS sold no third party products. A second third party brand, G-Plan, was added in 2010.

Parker Knoll, the latest addition to the third party brands, was added to the range in March 2014.

=== Own brands ===
In 2010, ScS launched its first own sofa brand, SiSi Italia. A second own brand, Endurance, was added in 2012, which encompasses upholstery and flooring products. Over the following years, Inspire, Living and Signature were added along with Brand tie ins with Ideal Home, and Lawrence Llewellyn Bowen. Following the March 2026 rebrand, the majority of the range is sold under exclusively poltronesofà collections.
