= Colonnade (disambiguation) =

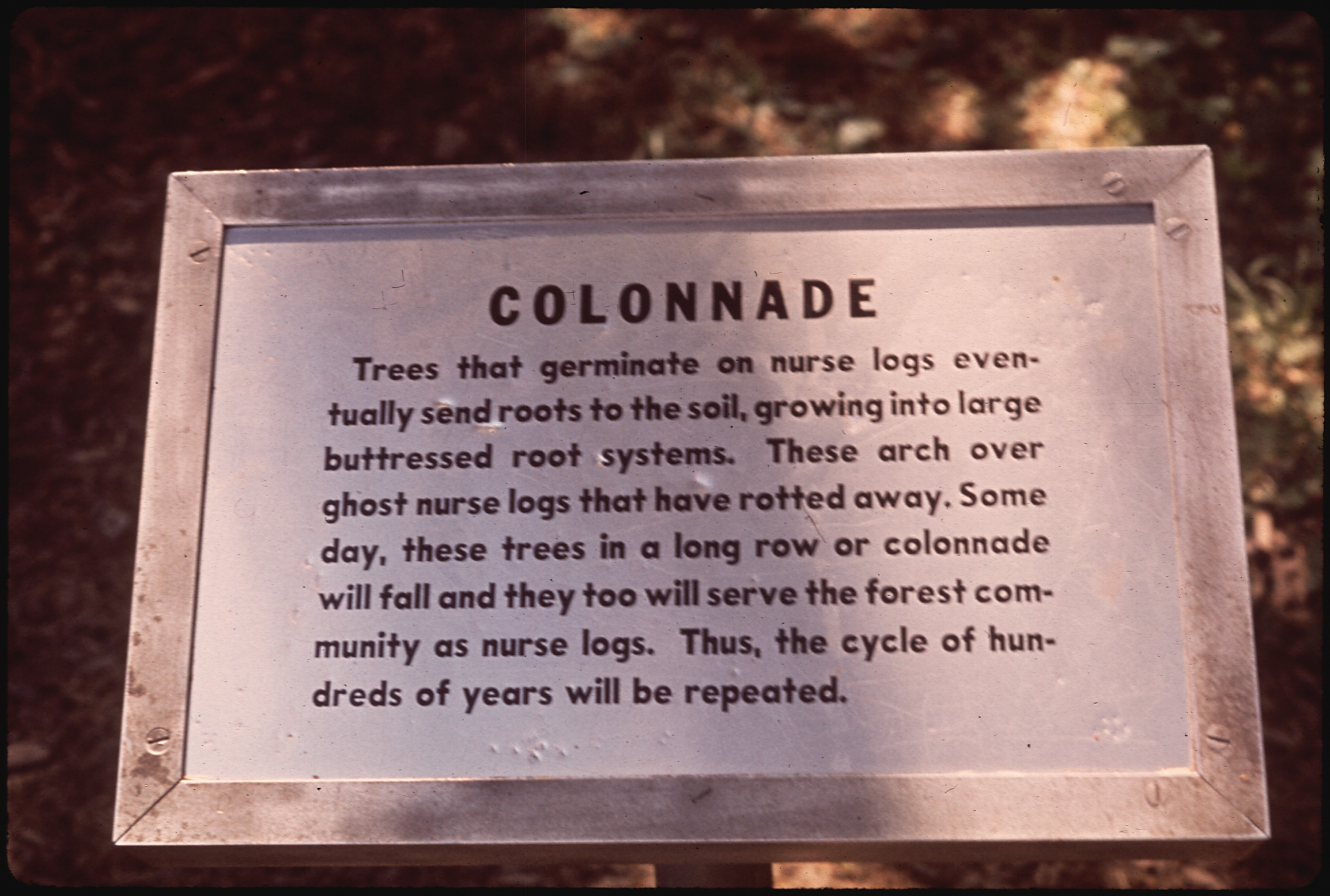
A 1972 U.S. trail sign in the Hoh Rainforest, illustrating one use of the term.

A colonnade is an architectural feature. Colonnade may also refer to:

- Third-generation GM A platform vehicles made by General Motors from 1973 to 1977, known as the "Colonnade" style.
- Centro Colonnades, shopping centre
- Colonnade Apartments, Mis van de Rohe building in Newark
- Colonnade Hotel, London
- Colonnade (Fabergé egg)
- Colonnade Row
- Colonnades Leisure Park, retail park and entertainment complex
- Colonnade at State College, shopping center
- I-5 Colonnade
- Louvre Colonnade
- Mill Colonnade
- Swinton Colonnade
- The Evening Colonnade
- 25 North Colonnade
- Colonnade (restaurant), a historic restaurant in Tampa, Florida
- The Colonnade, a mixed-use building in Toronto
- The Colonnades, condominium buildings in Atlanta's Virginia-Highland neighborhood
- Colonnade Pizza, a restaurant in Ottawa
