= Wick, Worcestershire =

Village in Worcestershire, England

Coordinates: 52.1064°N 2.050066°W

Wick
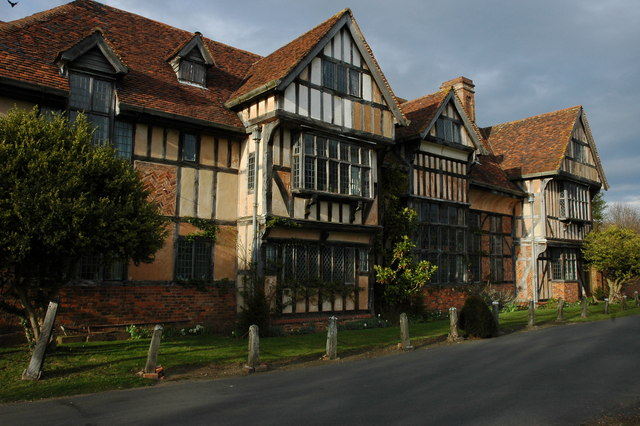
- Wick Manor

- Location within Worcestershire
- OS grid reference: SO965455
- District: Wychavon
- Shire county: Worcestershire
- Region: West Midlands
- Country: England
- Sovereign state: United Kingdom
- Post town: PERSHORE
- Postcode district: WR10
- Police: West Mercia
- Fire: Hereford and Worcester
- Ambulance: West Midlands
- UK Parliament: Droitwich and Evesham

Wick is a village in the district of Wychavon in the county of Worcestershire, England. It is two miles from the town of Pershore in the Vale of Evesham, and in a large bend in the River Avon. It is bounded by areas of parkland listed by the Wychavon District Council as Locally Important Parks and Gardens.

The World War II film Our Father was partially filmed on location in Wick.

== History ==
Records of the settlement date from Saxon times. In 709 CE, Offa, King of Mercia and Coenred and King of East Saxons granted Wikewane, which was made up of seven farms to Bishop Egwin of Worcester for his newly created monastery in Evesham. Domesday archives record that parts of Wick had belonged to the land of Pershore Abbey that was confiscated in the 11th century by Edward the Confessor and given to Westminster Abbey.

The manor of Wike Burnell was a substantial country house, known to have been in existence at 1500 with extensive parkland. It was owned by John Nevill, 3rd Lord Latimer, involved in the Pilgrimage of Grace in 1538. Upon his death in 1543, he willed the manor to his widow Catherine Parr. Parr would go on to marry King Henry VIII as his sixth and last wife in July 1543. After Parr's death in 1548, the house went to Sir Anthony Babington who was executed in 1588 for his part in the plot to kill Queen Elizabeth I. The manor then fell to Sir Walter Raleigh.

The Hudson family took over the manor and have been the owners since the 18th century. In 2008, Charles Hudson bought at auction which featured a lock of hair supposedly belonging to the late queen consort Catherine Parr. Mr Hudson paid £2,160 for the hair, mounted in an oval frame on ink-inscribed paper which states "Hair of Queen Catherine Parr, Last Consort of Henry, the night she died September 5th 1548 was in the Chapel of Sudeley Castle".

== St Mary's Church ==
The oldest surviving building in Wick is the 12th-century church of which parts of the original structure survive in the foundations and stone columns.

== Notable people ==
- Cressida Connolly, writer, and her daughter Nell Hudson, actress
- Edward McMillan-Scott, former MEP and the last and longest-serving (10 years) UK Vice-president of the European Parliament
