= The Rock Pool =

First edition cover (Obelisk Press)

The Rock Pool is a novel written by Cyril Connolly, first published in 1936. It is Connolly's only novel and is set at the end of season in a small resort in the south of France. Connolly's main character, Naylor, starts with a study of the decadent inhabitants of the resort and ends up becoming one of them.

== Background ==
Connolly married in 1930 and with the financial support of his wife, he has been able to enjoy a life of travel and particularly enjoyment of Mediterranean resorts. The novel is set in the fictitious Trou-sur-mer ("Hole on the Sea"), which is said to have been based on Cagnes-sur-Mer between Cannes and Nice.

Connolly had difficulty having the work published. The publisher who initially accepted it then turned it down because one of the partners objected to the heavy lesbian content. A second publisher explained that it could not be published "over here". Connolly then approached the Obelisk Press of Paris, who published it, but complained that the Anglo-Saxon reticence disgraced their list. It was published in Britain by Hamish Hamilton in 1947.

To the modern reader, it may be surprising that the novel should have been considered obscene. The objection at the time was to the lack of "moral weight". This, Connolly attributes to his classical education, when he discovered by the use of cribs that the dry Latin he read was the "ironical, sensual and irreligious opinions of a middle-aged Roman, one whose chief counsel to youth was to drink and make love to the best of its ability".

The central metaphor, the rock pool, was chosen because it represented a repository of life on a seashore, stranded in the rocks after the tide had gone out – an allusion to Trou-sur-mer and its inhabitants. Most of its characters were based on real individuals whose existence was precarious.

The main character, Naylor, was apparently based on two people. One, likely Connolly himself, he described as sensitive, self-pitying, proud, romantic and a day-dreamer, who had lost his ambition and drive. The other was later revealed to be an acquaintance of Connolly: J. N. (Nigel) Richards, who was noted for being unlucky in love and other matters. Richards had abandoned a career as a stockbroker to become a tea planter in Burma – where his first wife had been killed by a crocodile, after falling from a boat. According to Connolly's biographer, Jeremy Lewis, when Connolly wrote The Rock Pool he believed, incorrectly, that Nigel Richards had also died in Burma. When the two men met by chance, after the novel had been released, Connolly exclaimed: "my God, I thought you were dead!" (During the Second World War, Nigel Richards served with the RAF. In 1944, he was the rear gunner of a Lancaster bomber (JA905), commanded by Flight Lieutenant Jack Newton, shot down in Germany. There were no survivors.)

Connolly dedicated The Rock Pool to Peter Quennell, who had been at Balliol College with him. (Quennell would later write the introduction to a 1981 reprint of the novel.)

In 1938, Connolly published Enemies of Promise, a critical work, in which he attempted to explain his failure to produce the literary masterpiece which he and others believed he should have been capable of writing.

== Summary of plot ==
Naylor, an apprentice stock-broker with literary aspirations, drifts into Trou, which he imagines as an archeological relic of the nineteen-twenties riviera life-style. In time he meets a succession of artists and drifters, and in his disappointing quest "to have somebody tonight" he is successively swindled by them. Fascinated by their histories he decides to linger on in the town, but, in a clash between his staid English upbringing and the dissolute dog-eat-dog life-style, he is embroiled in squabbles and fights and progressively demoralised by his acquaintances. In due course, the main characters leave town, and Naylor, left behind sinking into a haze of Pernod, finds himself described by passing tourists as "Just another bum".
