= Palinurus =

Roman mythological character in the Aeneid

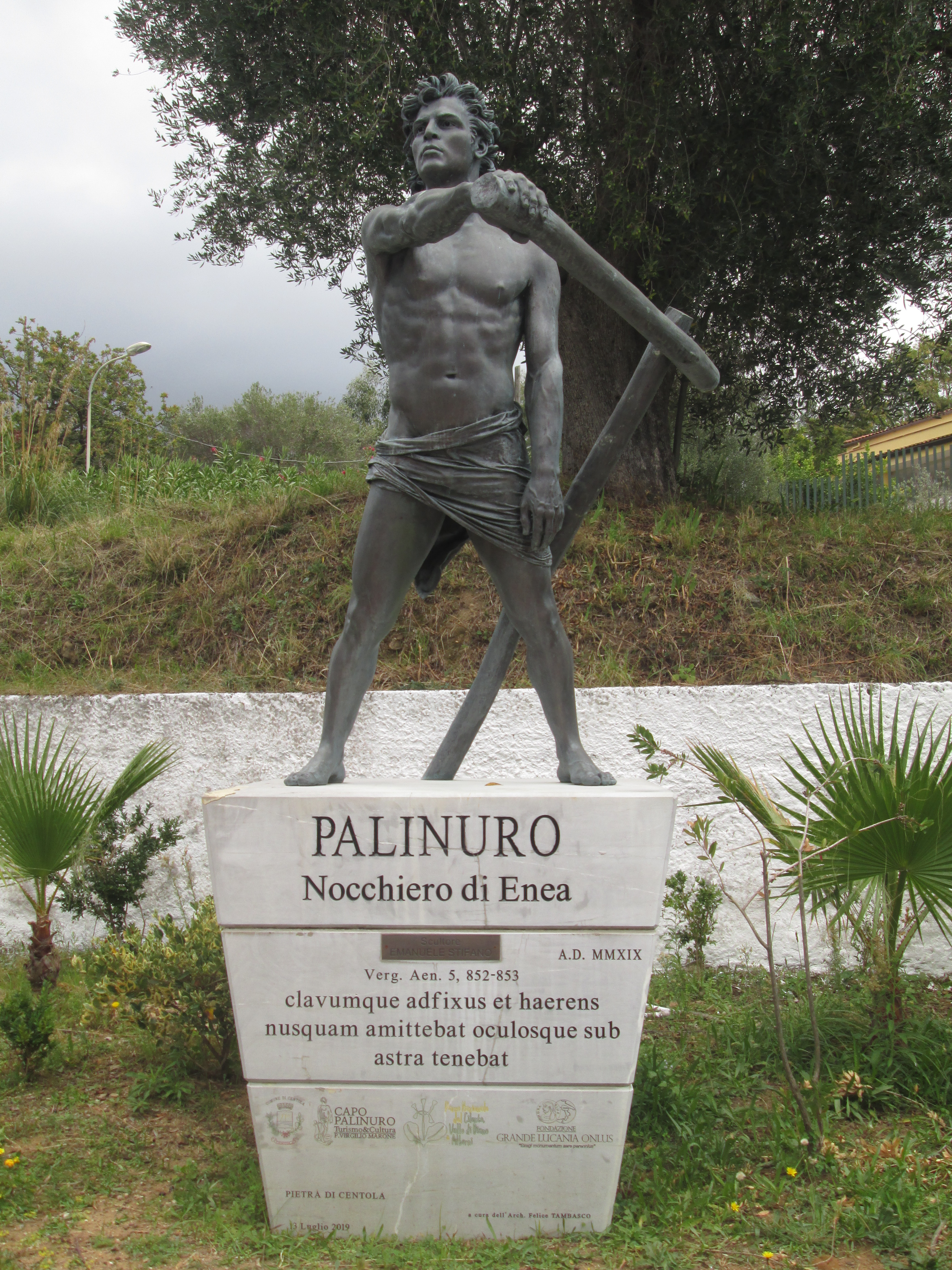

Palinurus (Palinūrus), in Roman mythology and especially Virgil's Aeneid, is the coxswain of Aeneas' ship. Later authors used him as a general type of navigator or guide. Palinurus is an example of human sacrifice; his life is the price for the Trojans landing in Italy.

== Palinurus in the Aeneid ==
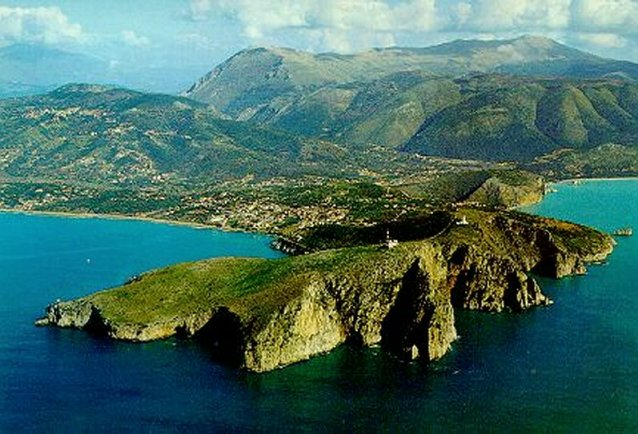
Cape Palinuro: "Those living near will build you a mound. Through the remainder of time that site will be named Palinurus" (Aeneid 6.378-81).

In Book 3, which tells of the Trojans' wanderings after The Fall of Troy, he is singled out as an experienced navigator. In Book 5, when the Trojans have left Carthage, he advises Aeneas to forestall sailing to Italy and to wait out a terrible storm on Sicily, where they hold the funeral games honoring Aeneas's father, Anchises. After they leave Sicily for Italy, Palinurus, at the helm of Aeneas's ship and leading the fleet, is singled out by Virgil in second person when it becomes clear that he is the one whom the gods will sacrifice to guarantee safe passage to Italy for the Trojans: unum pro multis dabitur caput, "one single life shall be offered to save many." Drugged by the god of sleep, he falls overboard; Aeneas takes over the helm and, unaware of the gods' influence, accuses Palinurus of complacency: "You, Palinurus, placed too much trust in the sky and the ocean's / Calm. You'll lie naked and dead on the sands of an unknown seashore."

Aeneas next encounters Palinurus in the underworld, before he crosses Cocytus (which the ghosts of the unburied dead cannot cross into the underworld proper), where he asks how it came to be that he died despite a prophecy from Apollo that he would reach Italy unscathed. Palinurus responds that he survived the plunge into the sea, was washed ashore after four days near Velia, and was killed there and left unburied. The Cumaean Sibyl, who has guided Aeneas into the underworld, predicts that locals will come and build him a mound and the place will be named Cape Palinuro in his honor.

The death of Palinurus is, according to classical scholar Bill Gladhill, "the most lucid example of this representation of human sacrifice in which the divine perspective construes his death in terms of unus pro multis".

Scholars have recognized in Palinurus a counterpart of Homer's Elpenor, who dies while Odysseus is on Circe's island; in their haste, his comrades do not look for him and his body remains unburied. When Odysseus is in Hades, he is accosted by Elpenor, and after his return he cremates Elpenor's body and erects a monument for him. Virgil takes that tradition, and changes details, such as the cremation ceremony, to fit Roman custom. Palinurus falling overboard shows the influence of the "shipwreck" trope, popular in the centuries before Virgil; Richard F. Thomas read the Palinurus episode in the light of the epigrams found in the Milan Papyrus, ascribed to Posidippus.

== Later references ==
One of Martial's epigrams (3.78) plays on Palinurus's name by turning it into an obscene pun:

Minxisti currente semel, Pauline, carina.
Meiere vis iterum? Iam Palinurus eris.

("You pissed one time, Paulinus, as the ship hurried along. / Do you want to piss again? Then you'll be Palinurus.")
"Palinurus" is assigned a humorous etymology, as though it were derived from πάλιν ("again") and the root of οὐρέω ("to urinate"), thus πάλιν-οὖρος ("again-pisser").

In the early thirteenth century, William the Breton compared Christ to Palinurus in the "Invocatio divini auxilii" of his epic poem, the Philippide, stating "You are the path, You are my guide, You are the ship, You are my Palinurus. Make my passage through the rough seas safe for me."

In the fifteenth century, Maffeo Vegio, famous for his continuations of the Aeneid, published a dialogue of the dead (in the vein of Lucian's Dialogi Mortuorum), Palinurus or On Happiness and Misery, consisting of a dialogue between Palinurus and Charon, in which Palinurus plays the part of the young man who bemoans his lot, while Charon, an older and wiser character, expounds on Stoic philosophy.

Since the nineteenth century, scholars have recognized that in Dante's Purgatorio Palinurus can be identified (though he is never named) with Manfred, King of Sicily, whom Dante and Virgil meet in Canto 3. Palinurus here stands for the dead soul who cannot be at rest (in Virgil's scheme, cross the river Cocytus; in Dante's, cross Acheron) because his bones are unburied: Manfred's remains, after being covered by a mound of stones, is disinterred by order of the Catholic Church because he had been excommunicated (by no fewer than three successive popes). Canto 3, the canto of the "sheepfold of the excommunicates", discusses the problem of the body and the soul (Dante's character casts a shadow at the foot of Mount Purgatory, in contrast to the bodiless souls that populate purgatory) and the concept of exclusion (from "physical burial,...safety, the sacraments of the church,...divine grace absolutely"). It opens with Virgil mentioning his own burial and the translation of his body from Brindisi to Naples, drawing a connection between Virgil himself and Palinurus. Worse than Palinurus, who can be at rest after he is reburied, Virgil's soul can never be at ease since he was unbaptized and thus is eternally "suspended" in Limbo.

Christian commentators saw "an anticipation of the sacrifice of Christ" in Palinurus – unum pro multis dabitur caput prefigures the biblical "that one man should die for the people" (John 11:50). Palinurus's request to Aeneas, "save me, unconquered one, from this vile doom", "resonates with the Catholic liturgy" in the Latin translation of Psalm 58, "Deliver me, Lord, from my enemies."

Palinurus is mentioned in Utopia by Sir Thomas More as a type of careless traveler. "'Then you're not quite right,' he replied, 'for his sailing has not been like that of Palinurus, but more that of Ulysses, or rather of Plato. This man, who is named Raphael.'"

Sir Walter Scott made reference to Palinurus in his Marmion, comparing him to William Pitt the Younger, who had died while Scott was working on the poem.

The name Palinurus was the pseudonym adopted by Cyril Connolly for The Unquiet Grave.

The legend of Palinurus as being unburied is referenced in H. P. Lovecraft's "The Tomb".

Derek Mahon wrote a poem 'Palinurus' on the legend.

== See also ==
- 4832 Palinurus, Jovian asteroid
