= Financial Services Authority =

2001–2013 UK quasi-judicial body

Agency overview
- Formed: December 2001
- Dissolved: April 2013
- Superseding agency: Prudential Regulation Authority, Financial Conduct Authority
- Jurisdiction: United Kingdom
- Headquarters: 25 North Colonnade London, United Kingdom
- Employees: 3,801
- Agency executive: Adair Turner, Chairman

The Financial Services Authority (FSA) was a quasi-judicial body accountable for the regulation of the financial services industry in the United Kingdom between 2001 and 2013. It was founded as the Securities and Investments Board (SIB) in 1985. Its board was appointed by the Treasury, although it operated independently of government. It was structured as a company limited by guarantee and was funded entirely by fees charged to the financial services industry.

Due to perceived regulatory failure of the banks during the 2008 financial crisis, the UK government decided to restructure financial regulation and abolish the FSA. On 19 December 2012, the Financial Services Act 2012 received royal assent, replacing the FSA with effect from 1 April 2013. Its responsibilities were then split between two new agencies: the Financial Conduct Authority (which, legally, is the same body corporate as the Financial Services Authority, merely renamed) and the Prudential Regulation Authority of the Bank of England.

Until its abolition, Lord Turner of Ecchinswell was the FSA's chairman and Hector Sants was CEO until the end of June 2012, having announced his resignation on 16 March 2012.

Its main office was in Canary Wharf, London, with another office in Edinburgh. When acting as the competent authority for listing of shares on a stock exchange and maintaining the Official List, it was referred to as the UK Listing Authority (UKLA).

== History ==
=== SIB ===
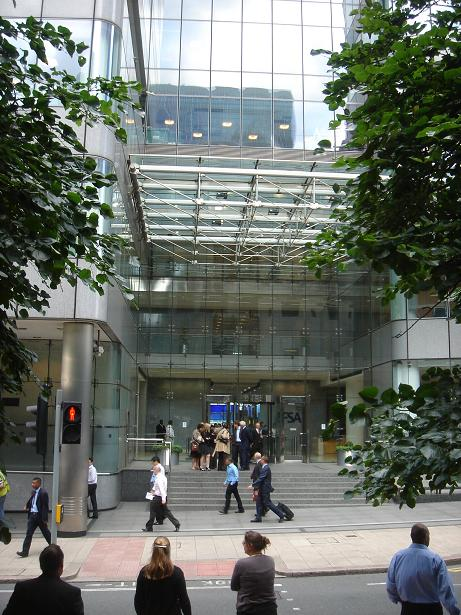
Main entrance – 25 North Colonnade (Canary Wharf, London) – FSA building

The Securities and Investments Board Ltd ("SIB") was incorporated on 7 June 1985 at the instigation of the UK Chancellor of the Exchequer, who was the sole member of the company and who delegated certain statutory regulatory powers to it under the then Financial Services Act 1986. It had the legal form of a company limited by guarantee (number 01920623). After a series of scandals in the 1990s, culminating in the collapse of Barings Bank, there was a desire to bring to an end the self-regulation of the financial services industry and to consolidate regulatory responsibilities which had been split amongst multiple regulators.

=== FSA ===
The name of the Securities and Investments Board was changed to the Financial Services Authority on 28 October 1997 and it started to exercise statutory powers given to it by the Financial Services and Markets Act 2000 that replaced the earlier legislation and came into force on 1 December 2001. At that time the FSA also took over the role of the Securities and Futures Authority (SFA) which had been a self-regulatory organisation responsible for supervising the trading in shares and futures in the UK.

=== Abolition ===
On 16 June 2010, the Chancellor of the Exchequer, George Osborne, announced plans to abolish the FSA and separate its responsibilities between a number of new agencies and the Bank of England. The Financial Conduct Authority would be responsible for policing the financial activities of the City and the banking system. A new Prudential Regulation Authority would carry out the prudential regulation of financial firms, including banks, investment banks, building societies and insurance companies.

On 19 December 2012 the Financial Services Act 2012 received royal assent and came into force on 1 April 2013. The act created a new regulatory framework for financial services. Specifically, the Act renamed the Financial Services Authority as the Financial Conduct Authority, but transferred to the Bank of England responsibility for financial stability, bringing together macro and micro prudential regulation, and created a new regulatory structure consisting of the Bank of England's Financial Policy Committee, the Prudential Regulation Authority and the Financial Conduct Authority.

== Activities ==
=== Scope ===
From 14 January 2005 the FSA also regulated the motor industry, applicable when insurance products were sold in conjunction with the vehicle purchase. This regulation, which covered around 5,000 motor dealers, focused heavily on the FSA's "Treating Customers Fairly".

=== Statutory objectives ===
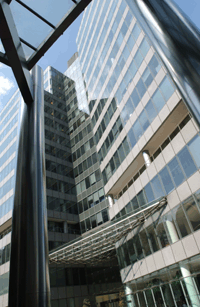
25 The North Colonnade

The Financial Services Act 2010, which was passed by Parliament on 8 April 2010, gave the FSA the additional statutory objective of "Contributing to the protection and enhancement of the stability of the UK financial system" and removed the public awareness objective.

=== Retail consumers ===
The FSA had a priority of making retail markets for financial products and services work more effectively, and so help retail consumers to get a fair deal. Over several years, the FSA developed work to raise levels of confidence and capability among consumers. From 2004, this work was described as a national strategy on building financial capability in the UK.

In June 2006, the FSA created its Retail Distribution Review (RDR) programme which they maintained would enhance consumer confidence in the retail investment market. The RDR came into force on 31 December 2012.

The RDR was expected to have a significant impact on the way in which financial services are delivered to retail investors in the UK. The primary delivery mechanism of financial services to retail customers was via approximately 30,000 financial intermediaries (FIs) who were authorised and regulated by the FSA. They were expected to bear the brunt of the force of the RDR. The key elements of RDR were:

1. Independent advice is truly independent and reflects investors' needs.
2. People can clearly identify and understand the service they are being offered.
3. Commission-bias is removed from the system and recommendations made by advisers are not influenced by product providers.
4. Investors know up-front how much advice is going to cost and how they will pay for it.
5. All investment advisers will be qualified to a new, higher level, regarded as equivalent to the first year of a degree

The combination of these factors was expected to significantly reduce the profitability of many FI practices. In anticipation of the new regulatory environment being enforced the industry landscape is undergoing significant change. Despite the fact that many in the industry are considered to be poorly prepared for the changes coming into effect, The most significant identifiable trends are:

1. Consolidators buying up small firms of FIs as a result of the higher qualifications threshold and downward pressures on profitability resulting from RDR – E&Y estimate that the number of Registered Individuals will fall from 30,000 to 20,000 within the next 5 years.
2. IFAs are embracing the concept of wrap account – incumbent fund supermarkets and Life Assurance Companies are in response launching their own Wrap Platforms.
3. IFAs are rapidly moving from the traditional investment solution for clients: recommending a portfolio of largely equity-oriented collective investment schemes (Unit trusts and OEICs) and being paid initial and annual renewal commission by the fund provider to an outsourcing model: recommending that clients appoint a discretionary fund manager to manage the client's portfolio(s) and charging the client an annual oversight fee. A recent survey found that 89% of IFAs are considering outsourcing to discretionary managers as a result of RDR.
4. Several new entrants are making major in-roads into this market at the expense of the incumbent retail-oriented funds groups such as Schroders, Gartmore, Fidelity Investments etc. The larger discretionary fund managers are finding it difficult to adapt their business models to cope with these changes, given that the small average portfolio size is better suited to multi-manager (portfolio of funds) solutions, via wrap platforms, when these fund managers tend to prefer to retain custody and investing in direct equities.

=== 2009 regulations ===
The Payment Services Regulations 2009 came into force on 1 November 2009 and shifted the onus onto the banks to prove negligence by the holder of debit and credit cards in cases of disputed payments.

On the same date the Banking Conduct Regime commenced.

== Organisation ==
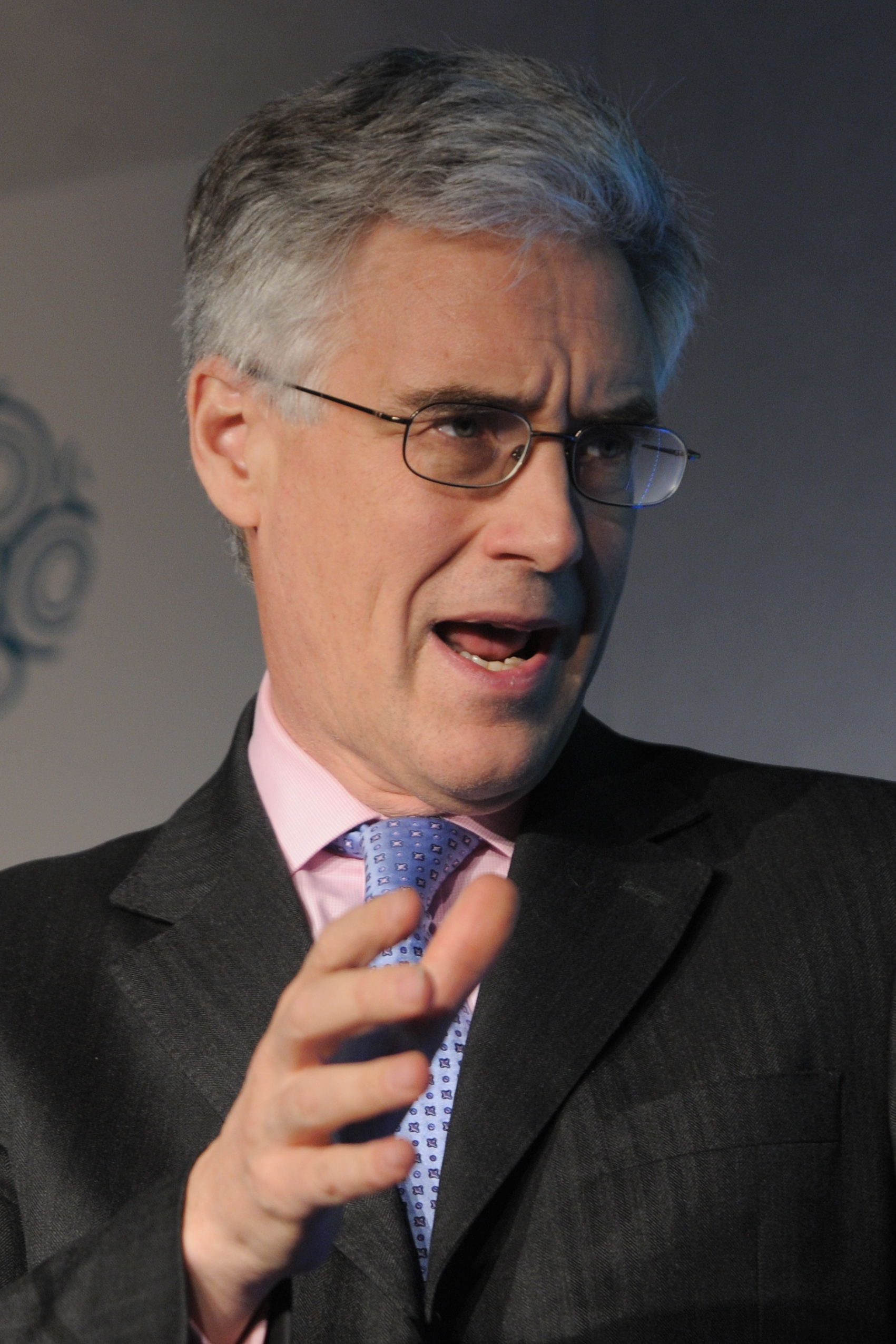
Lord Turner, Chairman of the Financial Services Authority.

The FSA was governed by a Board appointed by HM Treasury. At the time of abolition its executive chairman was Adair Turner. Hector Sants was CEO until the end of June 2012, having announced his resignation on 16 March 2012. The FSA was also provided with advice on the interests and concerns of consumers by the Financial Services Consumer Panel.

== Criticisms ==
The FSA rarely took on wider implication cases. For example, thousands of consumers have complained to the Financial Ombudsman Service about payment protection insurance (PPI) and bank charges. This was despite determining that there was a problem in the selling of PPI.

The FSA in an internal report into the handling of the collapse in confidence of customers of the Northern Rock Plc described themselves as inadequate. It was reported that to prevent such a situation occurring again, the FSA was considering allowing a bank to delay revealing to the public when it gets into financial difficulties.

The FSA was criticised in the final report of the European Parliament's inquiry into the crisis of the Equitable Life Assurance Society. It is widely reported that the long-awaited Parliamentary Ombudsman's investigation into the government's handling of Equitable Life is equally scathing of the FSA's handling of this case

The FSA ignored warning signals from Northern Rock building society and continued to allow the bank to operate without a risk mitigation programme for months before the bank's collapse.

Despite heavily criticising split-cap investment trusts, in 2007 it suddenly abandoned its investigation.

There were also some questions raised about the competence of FSA staff.

Although one of the prime responsibilities of the FSA was to protect consumers, the FSA was active in trying to ensure companies' anonymity when they were involved in misselling activity, preferring to side with the companies that have been found guilty rather than consumers.

It was announced in November 2008, that despite self-acknowledged failures by the FSA in effectively regulating the financial services industry, FSA staff would receive bonuses. On 31 May 2008, The Times confirmed that FSA staff had received £20m in bonuses for 2008/09, a 40% increase on the previous year.

On 11 February 2009, FSA deputy chairman, Sir James Crosby resigned after it was revealed that he had fired a whistleblower, Paul Moore, who had warned of dangerous lending practices at HBOS when he had been in charge of risk regulation.

Lord Adair Turner, the then FSA chairman, defended the actions of the regulator on the BBC's Andrew Marr show on 13 February 2009. His comments were that other regulatory bodies throughout the world, which had a variety of different structures and which are perceived either as heavy touch or light touch also failed to predict the economic collapse. In line with the other regulators, the FSA had failed intellectually by focusing too much on processes and procedures rather than looking at the bigger economic picture. In response as to why Sir James Crosby had been appointed deputy chairman when his bank HBOS had been highlighted by the FSA as using risky lending practises, Lord Turner said that they had files on almost every financial institution indicating a degree of risk.

Turner faced further criticism from the Treasury Select Committee on 25 February 2009, especially over failures to spot or act on reckless lending by banks before the crisis of 2008 occurred. He attributed much of the blame on the politicians at the time for pressuring the FSA into "light touch" regulation.

On 17 April 2009, a whistleblower (former FSA employee) alleged that the FSA had turned a blind eye to the explosion in purchases of whole sale loans taken on by various UK building societies from 2005 onwards. The FSA denied the claims – "This is not whistleblowing, it is green ink" a spokesman said. "The allegations are a farrago of lies, distortions and half truths made by an obviously disgruntled former employee who clearly has an axe to grind. It does not paint a realistic picture of our supervision of building societies."

On 18 August 2012, the Treasury Select Committee criticised the FSA for its poor enforcement of the LIBOR rate setting rules.

=== More principles-based regulation ===
There were suggestions that the FSA stifled the UK financial services industry through over-regulation, following a leaked letter from Prime Minister Tony Blair during 2005. This incident led Callum McCarthy, then Chief Executive of the FSA, to formally write to the Prime Minister asking him to either explain his opinions or retract them.

The Prime Minister's criticisms were viewed as particularly surprising since the FSA's brand of light-touch financial regulation was typically popular with banks and financial institutions in comparison with the more prescriptive rules-based regulation employed by the US Securities and Exchange Commission and by other European regulators; by contrast, most critiques of the FSA accused it of instigating a regulatory "race to the bottom" aimed at attracting foreign companies at the expense of consumer protection.

The FSA countered that its move away from rules-based regulation towards more principles-based regulation, far from weakening its consumer protection goals, could in fact strengthen them: "Our Principles are rules. We can take enforcement action on the basis of them; we have already done so; and we intend increasingly to do so where it is appropriate to do so." As an example, the enforcement action taken in late 2006 against firms mis-selling payment protection insurance was based on their violation of principle six of the FSA's Principles for Business, rather than requiring the use of the sort of complex technical regulations that many in financial services find burdensome.

=== Enforcement cases ===
The FSA was criticised for its supposedly weak enforcement program. For example, while FSMA prohibits insider trading, the FSA only successfully prosecuted two insider dealing cases, both involving defendants who did not contest the charges. Likewise, since 2001, the FSA only sought insider trading fines eight times against individuals and companies it regulated, despite the FSA's own studies indicating that unexplained price movements occur prior to around 25 percent of all UK corporate merger announcements.

After the HBOS insider trading scandal, the FSA informed MPs on 6 May 2008 that they planned to crack down on inside trading more effectively and that the results of their efforts would be seen in 2008/09 On 22 June, the Daily Telegraph reported that the FSA had wrapped up their case into HBOS insider trading and no action would be taken. On 26 June, the HBOS chairman said that "There is a strong case for believing that the UK is exceptionally bad at dealing with white-collar crime".

On 29 July 2008, however, it was announced that the Police, acting on information supplied by the FSA, had arrested workers at UBS and JP Morgan Cazenove for alleged insider dealing and that this was the third case within a week. A year after the subprime mortgage crisis had made global headlines, the FSA levied a record £900,000 on an IFA for selling subprime mortgages.

=== Actions relating to the 2007—2009 credit crisis ===
The FSA was held by some observers to be weak and inactive in allowing irresponsible banking to precipitate the credit crunch which commenced in 2007, and which has involved the shrinking of the UK housing market, increasing unemployment (especially in the financial and building sectors), the public acquisition of Northern Rock in mid-February 2008, and the takeover of HBOS by Lloyds TSB. On 18 September 2008, the FSA announced a ban on short selling to reduce volatility in difficult markets lasting until 16 January 2009.

Certainly, the FSA's implementation of capital requirements for banks was lax relative to some other countries. For example, it was reported that Australia's Commonwealth Bank is measured as having 7.6% Tier 1 capital under the rules of the Australian Prudential Regulation Authority, but this would be measured as 10.1% if the bank was under the jurisdiction of the FSA.

In March 2009, Lord Turner published a regulatory review of the 2008 financial crisis. The review broadly acknowledges that 'light touch' regulation had failed and that the FSA should concentrate on macroeconomic regulation as well as scrutinising individual companies. The review also proposed cross-border regulation of banks. There were no further promises to improve consumer protection or to directly intervene against financial institutions who treat their customers badly. The review was reportedly met with widespread relief in the city of London where firms had feared a 'revolution' in the way that they would be regulated.

== See also ==
- Financial regulation
- Financial Conduct Authority
- ORRF Risk Research Forum
- Prudential Regulation Authority
- Securities commission
