= Nell Hudson =

English actress (born 1990)

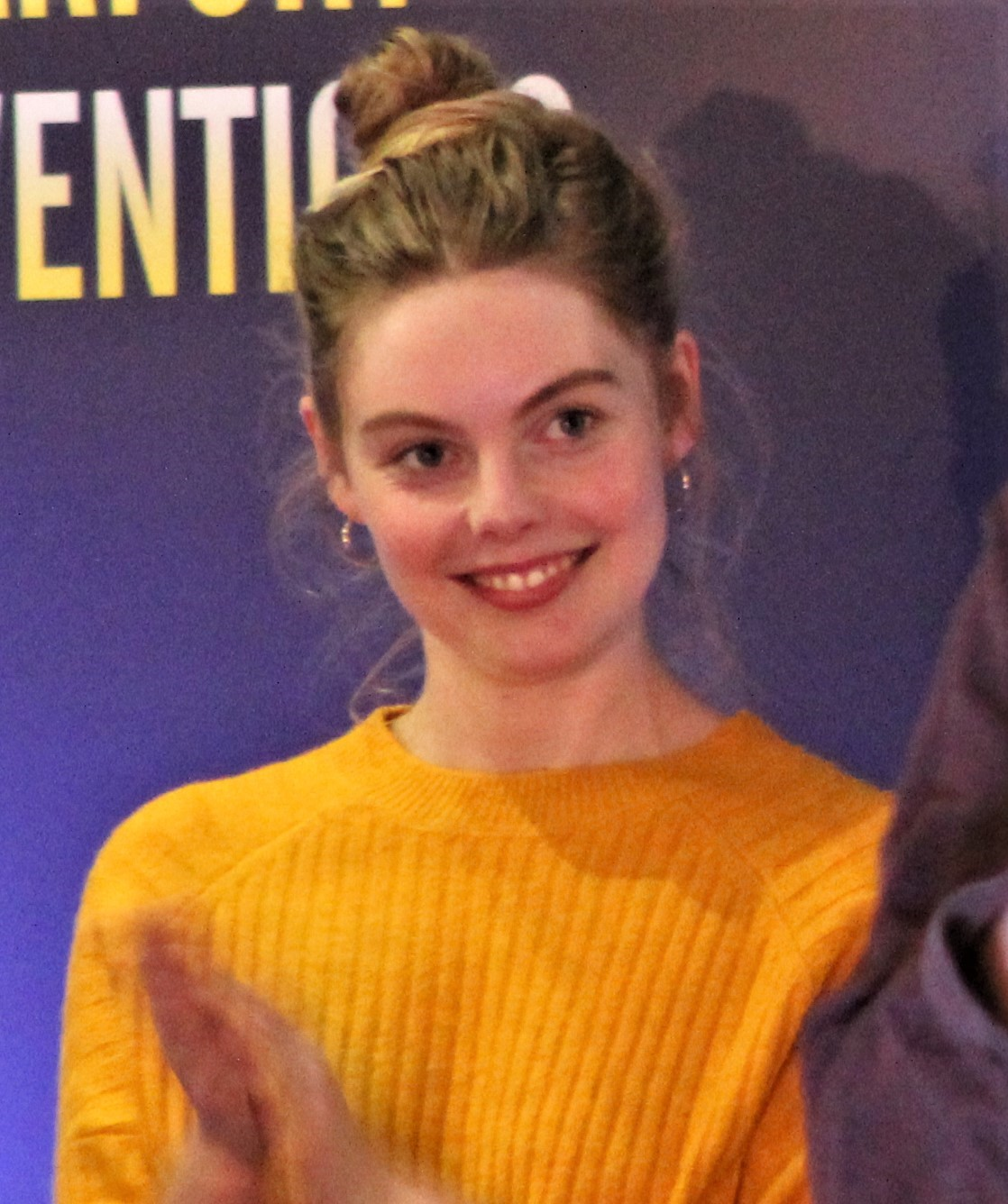
- Nell Hudson in 2018
- Born: 19 November 1990 (age 35); Worcester, Worcestershire, England
- Education: Oxford School of Drama
- Years active: 2008–present
- Spouse: Maximillian King (m. 2025)
- Children: 1
- Mother: Cressida Connolly
- Family: Cyril Connolly (grandfather)

Ellen Rose O. Hudson (born 19 November 1990) is an English actress, author, and musician. She is best known for her recurring roles as Laoghaire MacKenzie in the Starz drama Outlander (2014–present) and Nancy Skerrett in the ITV historical drama Victoria (2016–2019).

== Early life ==
Hudson was born on 19 November 1990 to journalist and author Cressida Connolly and Charles Hudson, the middle of three children, and grew up on the Wyke Manor Estate in Wick near Pershore. Her older sister Violet is a journalist who has written for The Daily Telegraph, The Spectator, and Tatler.

As a teenager, Hudson decided to pursue acting. She trained at the Oxford School of Drama, performing in plays such as The Crucible and Closer, eventually graduating with a degree in acting. Early in her career, she regularly featured in Tatler.

== Career ==
Hudson's first professional role, in 2012, was a guest spot in an episode of the fifteenth series of the BBC One medical drama Holby City. Later that year she appeared in Garrick Hamm's short film Cast Offs and director Bruce Logan's short Les Bohemes. In 2014, she landed the role of Laoghaire MacKenzie in Starz's time travel drama Outlander, based upon Diana Gabaldon's best-selling book series. The character is recurring and will continue throughout the series. On her character during the series' mid-season episode, Hudson stated that "when you are in just a lot of pain, it comes out as anger... I think that's quite a human characteristic, basically, and I think that's definitely what happens is that she's [Laoghaire] got all this pain and she doesn't know what to do with it and it comes out in this very kind of aggressive way and she does whatever she can do to rectify the situation."

Hudson guest-starred as Paulette Roland, a 17-year-old girl with Type 1 diabetes who discovers that she is pregnant, in series four of the BBC medical period drama Call the Midwife. The episode, which aired on 22 February 2015, explores the character's struggle with the possibility of either a dangerous pregnancy or a legal abortion. That same year she guest starred in NBC's international crime drama Crossing Lines. On 14 May 2015, Hudson played Lydia Bennet in Tamara Harvey's production of Jane Austen's Pride and Prejudice at the Sheffield Crucible, alongside James Northcote and Isabella Laughland.

In 2016, Hudson was featured in a series one episode of Sky One's amateur detective series Agatha Raisin, based upon the book series by MC Beaton. Hudson also appears in ITV's Victoria, a period drama centering on the life of British monarch Queen Victoria. She portrays Nancy Skerrett, the Queen's dresser, in the ongoing series.

BBC's drama Informer (2018), about police informants, sees Hudson in the role of Charlotte Humphreys, an art student and potential love interest to main character Raza.

Hudson had her first major film role in the 2022 installment of Texas Chainsaw Massacre. The following year, she played Clarissa Frost in the Paramount+ adaptation of The Doll Factory.

=== Music ===
Hudson worked briefly as a professional singer-songwriter, headlining at London's famous Ronnie Scott's Jazz Club, as well as touring with Jools Holland. She plays the piano and ukulele.

=== Writing ===
Hudson's debut novel, a story of friendship amid loss titled Just For Today, was released in early 2022 through Tinder Press.

== Personal life ==
Hudson lived in East London as of 2017 and has since moved to Peckham. She is vegan.

In March 2024, Hudson announced her engagement to producer Maximillian "Max" King. They were married in July 2025.

In 2025, Hudson gave birth to a daughter.

== Filmography ==
=== Film ===
Year	Title	Role	Notes
2016	Arrivals	Angel	
2022	Texas Chainsaw Massacre	Ruth	
2023	Haunting of the Queen Mary	Gwen Ratch	
2025	Salvable	Becky	

=== Television ===
Year	Title	Role	Notes
2012	Holby City	Tasha Cairncross	Episode: "And We Banish Shade"
2014–2018, 2024	Outlander	Laoghaire MacKenzie	Recurring role, 10 episodes
2015	Call the Midwife	Paulette Roland	Episode #4.6
2015	Crossing Lines	Aurelia Roche	Episode: "In Loco Parentis"
2016	Agatha Raisin	Kylie Stokes	Episode: "The Day the Floods Came"
2016–2019	Victoria	Nancy Skerrett	Recurring role; 24 episodes
2018	Informer	Charlotte Humphries	Miniseries; 4 episodes
2020	Death in Paradise	Tabitha Brown	Episode: "La Murder Le Diablé"
2021	The Irregulars	Princess Louise	3 episodes
2022	Toast of Tinseltown	Gypsy	Episode: "Death Valley"
2023	The Doll Factory	Clarissa Frost	6 episodes

=== Theatre ===
Year	Title	Role	Theatre
2008	Pride and Prejudice	Lydia Bennett	Sheffield Crucible

== Awards and nominations ==
Year	Award	Category	Nominated work	Result
2017	Satellite Awards	Best Ensemble (Television)	Outlander	Won
