= The Evening Colonnade =

Book by Cyril Connolly

- First edition
- Author: Cyril Connolly
- Language: English
- Publisher: David Bruce and Watson Ltd
- Publication date: 1973

The Evening Colonnade is a collection of essays and reviews by the English writer and critic Cyril Connolly. The volume was published by David Bruce and Watson Ltd in 1973 to coincide with Connolly's 70th birthday. The jacket was designed by Cecil Beaton, who had been a contemporary of Connolly at St Cyprian's prep school in Eastbourne.

The compilation followed a format similar to that of Connolly's previous volume of collected journalism, Previous Convictions, published by Hamish Hamilton in 1963. It consists primarily of Connolly's articles written when he was joint chief book reviewer (with Raymond Mortimer) for The Sunday Times. Other articles are taken from Harpers & Queen, the London Magazine, Art News, Art and Literature and The New York Times.

The work is divided into four sections as follows:

- "Dew on the Garlic Leaf" contains mainly essays of personal experience, starting with a continuation of the autobiographical element of Enemies of Promise
- "Divers of Worship" comprises mainly reviews of works associated with past writers
- "Nothing if not Critical" includes reviews of contemporary writers of the modern movement
- "The House of Two Doors" consists of articles about topics other than writers

Connolly derived the title ('Is not my work compact of columns?' he asked rhetorically in his introduction) from Alexander Pope's poem on Lady Mary Wortley Montagu:

What are the gay parterre, the chequer'd shade
The morning bower, the ev'ning colonnade
But soft recesses of uneasy minds
To sigh unheard in, to the passing winds?

Connolly also had in mind the Arcades of the Italian proto-surrealist painter Giorgio de Chirico.
