= Cyril Connolly =

English writer (1903–1974)

Cyril Connolly CBE
- Born: 10 September 1903; Coventry, Warwickshire, England
- Died: 26 November 1974 (aged 71); London, England
- Resting place: Berwick, East Sussex, England
- Other name: Palinurus
- Education: St Cyprian's School; Eton College; Balliol College, Oxford
- Occupations: Literary critic and writer
- Spouse: Barbara Skelton (m. 1950; div. 1956)
- Children: Cressida Connolly
- Father: Matthew William Kemble Connolly

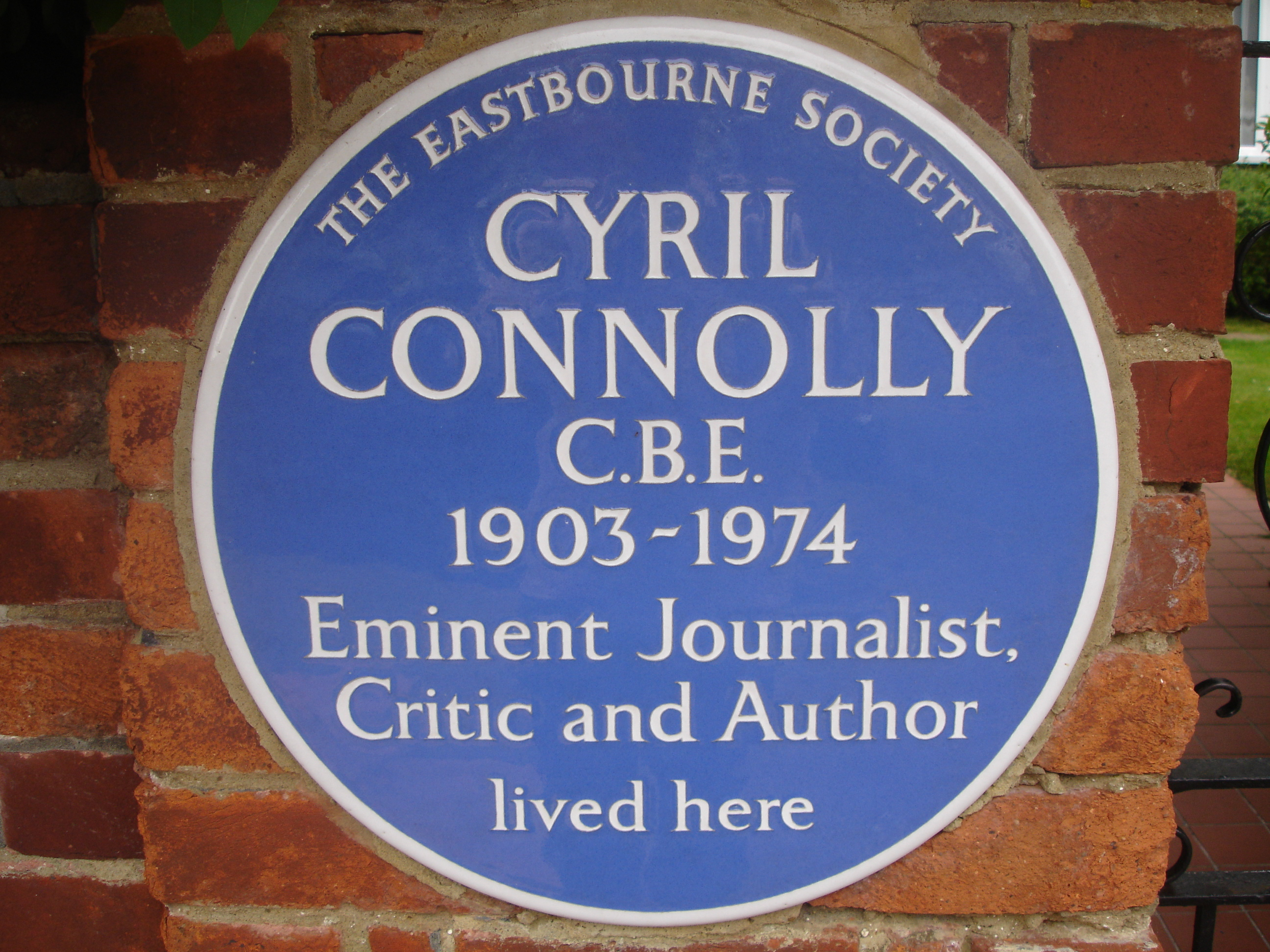
Historical marker plaque in St. John's Road, Eastbourne, East Sussex

Cyril Vernon Connolly (10 September 1903 – 26 November 1974) was an English literary critic and writer. He was the editor of the influential literary magazine Horizon (1940–49) and wrote Enemies of Promise (1938), which combined literary criticism with an autobiographical exploration of why he failed to become the successful author of fiction that he aspired to be in his youth.

== Early life ==
Cyril Connolly was born in Coventry, Warwickshire. He was the only child of Major Matthew William Kemble Connolly (1872–1947), an officer in the King's Own Yorkshire Light Infantry, by his Anglo-Irish wife, Muriel Maud Vernon, daughter of Colonel Edward Vernon (1838–1913) J.P., D.L., of Clontarf Castle, County Dublin. His parents had met while his father was serving in Ireland, and his father's next posting was to South Africa. Connolly's father was also a malacologist (the scientific study of the Mollusca, i.e. snails, clams, octopus, etc.) and mineral collector of some reputation and collected many samples in Africa. Cyril Connolly's childhood days were spent with his father in South Africa, with his mother's family at Clontarf Castle, and with his paternal grandmother in Bath, Somerset, and other parts of England.

Connolly was educated at St Cyprian's School, Eastbourne, where he enjoyed the company of George Orwell and Cecil Beaton. He was a favourite of the formidable headmistress Mrs Wilkes but was later to criticise the "character-building" ethos of the school. He wrote, "Orwell proved to me that there existed an alternative to character, Intelligence. Beaton showed me another, Sensibility." Connolly won the Harrow History Prize, pushing Orwell into second place, and the English prize leaving Orwell with Classics. He then won a scholarship to Eton, a year after Orwell.

== Eton ==
At Eton, after a traumatic first few terms, he settled into a comfortable routine. He won over his early tormentor Godfrey Meynell and became a popular wit. In 1919 his parents moved to The Lock House on the Basingstoke Canal at Frimley Green. At Eton, Connolly was involved in romantic intrigues and school politics, which he described in Enemies of Promise.

He established a reputation as an intellectual and earned the respect of Dadie Rylands and Denis King-Farlow. Connolly's particular circle included Denis Dannreuther, Bobbie Longden and Roger Mynors. In summer 1921, his father took him on a holiday to France, initiating Connolly's love of travel. The following winter he went with his mother to Mürren, where he became friends with Anthony Knebworth.

By this time his parents were living separate lives, his mother having established a relationship with another army officer and his father becoming an increasingly heavy drinker and absorbed in his study of slugs and snails. In 1922, Connolly achieved academic success winning the Rosebery History Prize, and followed by the Brackenbury History scholarship to Balliol College, Oxford. In the spring, he visited St Cyprian's to report his achievement to his old headmaster before setting off on a trip to Spain with a school friend.

Returning moneyless, he spent the night at St Martin-in-the-Fields. In his last term at Eton, he was elected to Pop, which brought him into contact with others he respected, including Nico Davies, Teddy Jessel and Lord Dunglass. He established rapport with Brian Howard, but, he concluded, "moral cowardice and academic outlook debarred him from making friends with Harold Acton, Oliver Messel, Robert Byron, Henry Green and Anthony Powell". Connolly was for years afterwards nostalgic about his time at Eton.

== Oxford ==
Connolly undertook a tour of Germany, Austria and Hungary before starting at Oxford University. After his cloistered existence as a King's Scholar at Eton, Connolly felt uncomfortable with the hearty beer-drinking rugby and rowing types at Oxford. His own circle included his Eton friends Mynors and Dannreuther, who were at Balliol with him, and Kenneth Clark, whom he met through Bobbie Longden at Kings. He wrote: "The only exercise we took was running up bills." His intellectual mentors were the Dean of Balliol, Francis Fortescue Urquhart, often referred to as "Sligger", who organised reading parties on the continent, and the Dean of Wadham, Maurice Bowra.

Connolly's academic career languished while his Oxford years were characterised by his travel adventures. In January 1923, he went with Urquhart and other collegers to Italy. In March, he undertook his annual visit to Spain and in September, he went on the annual trip with the college group to Urquhart's chalet in the French Alps. On his return, he visited his father, now in a hotel in South Kensington, close to the Natural History Museum. At the end of the year, he went to Italy and Tunis. At Oxford, in 1924, he made a new friend Patrick Balfour, in the spring he went to Spain and in the summer of 1924, he went successively to Greece and Crete, Urquhart's chalet in the Alps and Naples. He spent Christmas with his parents in a rare get-together at the Lock House in Hampshire and at the beginning of 1925, he went with the college group to Minehead with Urquhart.

In his last year at Oxford, he was cultivating friendships with younger students Anthony Powell, Henry Yorke and Peter Quennell. In spring he was back in Spain, before returning to Oxford to take his final exams.

== Drifting ==
Connolly left Balliol in 1925 with a third class degree in history. He struggled to find employment, while his friends and family sought to pay off his extensive debts. In summer he went for his annual stay at Urquhart's chalet in the French Alps, and in the autumn went to Spain and Portugal. He obtained a post tutoring a boy in Jamaica and set sail for the Caribbean in November 1925. He returned to England in April 1926 on a banana boat in the company of Alwyn Williams, headmaster of Winchester College. He enrolled as a special constable in the General Strike, but it was over before he was actively involved. He responded to an advertisement to work as a secretary for Montague Summers but was warned off by his friends. Then in June 1926 he found a post as a secretary/companion to Logan Pearsall Smith, who was based in Chelsea and also had a house called Big Chilling near Warsash in Hampshire, overlooking the Solent. Pearsall Smith was to give Connolly an important introduction to literary life, and he influenced his ideas on the role of a writer with a distaste for journalism. Pearsall Smith gave Connolly £8 a week, whether Smith was around or not, and moreover gave him the run of Big Chilling.

== Beginning of literary career ==
In August 1926, Connolly met Desmond MacCarthy, who had come to stay at Big Chilling. MacCarthy was the literary editor of the New Statesman and was to be another major influence on Connolly's development. MacCarthy invited Connolly to write book reviews for the New Statesman. Later that year, Connolly made a trip to Budapest and Eastern Europe and then spent the winter of 1926–1927 in London. Pearsall Smith took Connolly with him to Spain in the spring, and Connolly then set off on his own to North Africa and Italy. They met up again in Florence, where Kenneth Clark was working with Bernard Berenson, who had married Pearsall Smith's sister.

Connolly departed for Sicily then returned to England via Vienna, Prague and Dresden. Connolly's first signed work in the New Statesman, a review of Laurence Sterne, appeared in June 1927. In July he set off to Normandy with his mother and then for his last stay at the chalet in the Alps. In August 1927, he was invited to become a regular reviewer and joined the staff of the New Statesman. His first review in September was of The Hotel by Elizabeth Bowen. Also in September, Connolly moved into a flat at Yeoman's Row with Patrick Balfour. He was working on various works that never saw the light of day: a novel Green Endings, a travel book on Spain, his diary and A Partial Guide to the Balkans. He approached Cecil Beaton to draw the cover design for the last and he received an advance for the work although it was eventually lost.

However, he started contributing pieces to various publications that appeared under his own name and various pseudonyms. At this time he developed a fascination with low life and prostitution and spent time in the poorer parts of London seeking them out (while other contemporaries were seeking out tramps). At the same time, he had developed an infatuation with Alix Kilroy whom he had met on a train back from the continent and used to wait outside her office for a sight of her. He then made a more positive romantic approach to Racy Fisher, one of a pair of nieces of Desmond MacCarthy's wife, Molly. Unfortunately, their father, Admiral Fisher, wanted them to have nothing to do with a penniless writer and, in February 1928, forbade further contact.

Sharing a flat with Balfour, Connolly's social circle expanded with new friends like Bob Boothby and Gladwyn Jebb. However, he was ill at ease and in April 1928 set off for Paris, where he met Pearsall Smith and Cecil Beaton and visited brothels posing as a journalist. He went on to Italy, where he stayed with Berenson and Mrs Keppel where he was taken with her daughter Violet Trefusis. Then via Venice and East European cities he made his way to Berlin to meet up with Jebb.

Jebb and Connolly stayed with Harold Nicolson in the company of Ivor Novello and Christopher Sykes and then made a tour of Germany. Connolly returned to Paris in May, borrowing money from Pearsall Smith so he could live cheaply in the rue Delambre. In Paris, he met Mara Andrews, a poetic lesbian who was in love with an absent American girl named Jean Bakewell (who was later to marry Connolly). On the way back to London, Connolly stayed with Nicolson and his wife, Vita Sackville-West, at Sissinghurst.

In August Connolly set off on his travels again to Germany, this time with Bobbie Longden and Raymond Mortimer and the experience gave rise to the essay "Conversations in Berlin" which MacCarthy published in his new magazine Life and Letters. Connolly travelled separately to Villefranche and spent five weeks in Barcelona with Longden before returning to London. Boothby lent him his London flat and he shared Gerald Brenan's fascination with working-class prostitutes with experiences that appeared in his fragment for a novel The English Malady. He spent Christmas at Sledmere with the Sykes family.

At the beginning of 1929, Connolly went briefly to Paris and just before returning to London, he met Jean Bakewell and stayed an extra night to get to know her. After a while, he was drawn to Paris again and, through Jean and Mara, became acquainted with the bohemian Montparnasse set, including Alfred Perles and Gregor Michonze who was to become the basis for Rascasse in The Rock Pool. He also met James Joyce about whom he wrote The Position of Joyce which appeared in Life and Letters. Connolly and Bakewell went to Spain together where they met up with Peter Quennell. Connolly then went to Berlin to stay with Nicolson until the latter managed to remove him as "not perhaps the ideal guest".

Unable to return to Big Chilling, he was stuck in Berlin for a month before returning to London. John Betjeman had moved into his room at Yeoman's Row, so he went to stay with Enid Bagnold at Rottingdean before visiting Dorset with Quennell. Bakewell had returned to America in the summer and was planning to return to Paris in the autumn to start a course at the Sorbonne. She had agreed before her departure to marry Connolly and Connolly established himself in Paris in September. They spent most of the rest of the year in Paris, and started their collection of pets, first ferrets and then lemurs. Connolly spent Christmas again at Sledmere.

== First marriage ==
In February 1930, aged 26, Connolly and Bakewell set off for America. They married in New York on 5 April 1930. Jean Bakewell "was to prove one of the more liberating forces in his life... an uncomplicated hedonist, independent, adventurous, celebrating the moment... An attractive personality: warm, generous, witty and approachable...." She provided modest financial support that enabled him to enjoy travels, particularly around the Mediterranean, hospitality and good food and drink. The newly married couple lived in various spots in England including the Cavendish Hotel, Bury Street, Bath, and Big Chilling, before in July 1930 settling at Sanary, near Toulon, in France. There their close neighbours were Edith Wharton and Aldous Huxley.

Although Connolly admired Huxley, the two men failed to establish a rapport, and the wives fell out. Connolly's bohemian home with the disorder of the lemurs was shunned and with debts rising they were forced to scrounge off Jean's mother. Sometime in 1931, they left Sanary and toured Provence, Normandy, Brittany, Spain, Morocco and Mallorca, before returning to Chagford, Devon. In November, they found a flat near Belgrave Square, and Connolly made his first contribution to the New Statesman in two years.

Connolly was also approached by John Betjeman of the Architectural Review to act as an art critic. Connolly's art critiques appeared in the magazine in 1932, and he visited Betjeman at his home at Uffington. There, he would meet Evelyn Waugh, who delighted in teasing Connolly. The Connollys enjoyed being part of a sophisticated literary social scene in London, but towards the end of the year, Jean had to undergo a gynaecological operation. As a result, she could not have a child, and it was hard for her to control her weight.

In February 1933, Connolly took Jean to Greece to recover, where they met Brian Howard. While they were in Athens there was an attempted coup d'état, which Connolly later reported in the New Statesman as "Spring Revolution". The Connollys then went with Howard and his boyfriend to Spain and the Algarve. After a row in a bar, they were incarcerated in a police cell and were sent back to England with the help of the British Embassy. In June, encouraged by Enid Bagnold, they rented a house at Rottingdean.

Writing to Bagnold from Cannes in September, Jean complained that their cheques were being bounced and she asked Bagnold to appeal to her husband Sir Roderick Jones of Reuters for help in work. That was dismissed, and in November, the letting agents for the Rottingdean property wrote an appalling report on the state in which the Connollys had left the place.

Early in 1934, the Connollys took a flat at 312A King's Road, where they entertained their friends, including Waugh and Quennell. Elizabeth Bowen arranged a dinner with Virginia Woolf and her husband when Connolly and Virginia Woolf took an instant dislike to each other.

During the year, the Connollys went to Mallow and Cork in Ireland. At the end of the year. Connolly met Dylan Thomas at a party and early in 1935 invited him in the company of Anthony Powell, Waugh, Robert Byron and Desmond and Mollie McCarthy. By then, Connolly's father was finding himself short of funds and was no longer prepared to bail out his son. However, Mrs Warner, Jean's mother, funded an expedition to Paris, Juan-les-Pins, Venice, Yugoslavia and Budapest. In Paris, Connolly spent some time with Jack Kahane, the avant garde publisher, and Henry Miller, with whom he established a strong rapport after an initial unsuccessful meeting. In Budapest, they found themselves in the same hotel as Edward, Prince of Wales and Wallis Simpson.

In 1934, Connolly was working on a trilogy: Humane Killer, The English Malady and The Rock Pool. Only The Rock Pool was completed, the others remaining only as fragments.

== First books ==
Connolly's only novel, The Rock Pool (1936), is a satirical work describing a covey of dissolute drifters at an end of season French seaside resort, which was based on his experiences in the south of France. It was initially accepted by a London publishing house but it changed its mind. Faber and Faber was one of the publishers that rejected it and so Connolly took it to Jack Kahane, who published it in Paris in 1936.

Connolly followed it up with a book of non-fiction, Enemies of Promise (1938), the second half of which is autobiographical. In it he attempted to explain his failure to produce the literary masterpiece that he and others believed that he should have been capable of writing.

== Horizon ==
In 1940, Connolly founded the influential literary magazine Horizon, with Peter Watson, its financial backer and de facto art editor. He edited Horizon until 1950, with Stephen Spender as an uncredited associate editor until early 1941. He was briefly (1942–1943) the literary editor for The Observer until a disagreement with David Astor. During World War II, he wrote The Unquiet Grave, a noteworthy collection of observations and quotes, under the pseudonym 'Palinurus'.

From 1952 until his death, he was joint chief book reviewer (with Raymond Mortimer) for The Sunday Times.

In 1962, Connolly wrote Bond Strikes Camp, a spoof account of Ian Fleming's character engaged in heroic escapades of dubious propriety as suggested by the title and written with Fleming's support. It appeared in London Magazine and in an expensive limited edition printed by the Shenval Press, Frith Street, London. It later appeared in Previous Convictions.

Connolly had previously collaborated with Fleming in 1952 in writing an account of the Cambridge Spies Guy Burgess and Donald MacLean entitled The Missing Diplomats, an early publication for Fleming's Queen Anne Press.

== Personal life ==
Connolly was married three times. His first wife Jean Bakewell (1910–1950) left him in 1939, moving back to the United States. She later became the wife of Laurence Vail (former husband of Peggy Guggenheim and Kay Boyle) but, following years of health problems, she died of a stroke while on a trip to Paris at the age of 39.

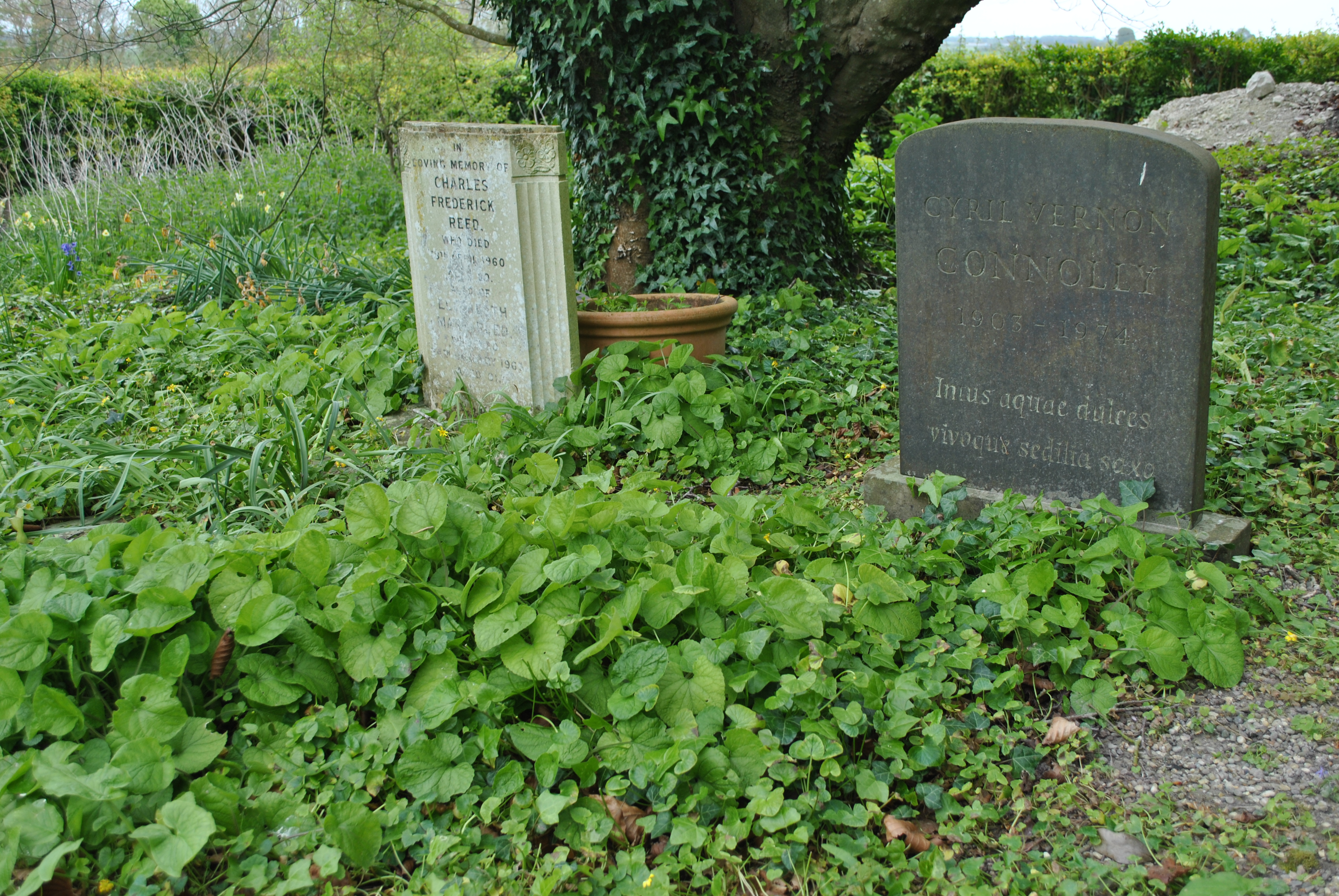
Connolly's grave (right) in Berwick, 2017.

Connolly married his second wife, Barbara Skelton, in 1950. The marriage ended in 1956. His third wife, whom he married in 1959, was Deirdre Craven (1931–2023), a granddaughter of James Craig, 1st Viscount Craigavon, by whom he had two children later in life, including the writer Cressida Connolly (born 1960). Through his daughter Cressida, Connolly is the paternal grandfather of the English actress Nell Hudson. After Connolly's death in 1974, his widow married Peter Levi.

In 1967, Connolly settled in Eastbourne, to the amusement of Beaton, who suggested he was lured back by the cakes they had enjoyed in school outings to the town. He died on 26 November 1974, aged 71, having continued to the end as a Sunday Times journalist, and was buried in Berwick churchyard, Sussex. His grave bears the inscription "Intus aquae dulces vivoque sedilia saxo" (Aeneid book IX: "Within, fresh water and seats in the living rock.")

Since 1976, Connolly's papers and personal library of over 8,000 books have been housed at the University of Tulsa.

== Assessment ==
In The Unquiet Grave, Connolly wrote: "Approaching forty, sense of total failure:... Never will I make that extra effort to live according to reality which alone makes good writing possible: hence the manic-depressiveness of my style,—which is either bright, cruel and superficial; or pessimistic; moth-eaten with self-pity."

Kenneth Tynan, writing in the March 1954 Harper's Bazaar, praised Connolly's style as "one of the most glittering of English literary possessions".

David Mason, in an essay on crime and booksellers, asserts that Connolly had a reputation among booksellers as a conniving thief: "That a man so important to modern literature acted so shoddily as to break an honourable code of conduct and steal from booksellers who had trusted him."

== References in popular culture ==
- Cyril Connolly's name appears in a coda to the Monty Python song "Eric the Half-a-Bee", as a mishearing of the words "semi-carnally". Despite being corrected, the backing vocalists then sing "Cyril Connolly" to the melody of the song. The same comedians made another reference to Connolly in The Brand New Monty Python Bok, which includes a facsimile Penguin paperback, Norman Henderson's Diary, complete with (invented) praise from Connolly.
- The critic and publisher Everard Spruce in Evelyn Waugh's Sword of Honour trilogy is a satire of Connolly.
- Ed Spain, "the Captain" in Nancy Mitford's 1951 novel The Blessing is a satire of Connolly.
- Michael Nelson's novel A Room in Chelsea Square (1958) is a thinly disguised homosexualised account about Connolly's time editing Horizon.
- Elaine Dundy's novel The Old Man and Me (1964) is based on her affair with Connolly.
- A film producer in Julian MacLaren-Ross's 1964 thriller My Name is Love is based on Connolly. MacLaren-Ross repeated many of the descriptions verbatim in his later memoir of Connolly.
- Connolly is quoted as saying "Better to write for yourself and have no public than to write for the public and have no self" in Season 5, Episode 7 of Criminal Minds.
- Since the film A Business Affair (1994) is adapted from Barbara Skelton's memoirs of her marriage to Cyril Connolly, Jonathan Pryce's character Alec Bolton in the film is based on Cyril Connolly
- Connolly is also fictionalised in Ian McEwan's 2001 novel Atonement. The principal character, eighteen-year-old Briony Tallis, sends the draft of a novella she has written to Horizon magazine and Cyril Connolly is shown as replying at length as to why the novella had to be rejected, apart from explaining to Briony her strong and weak points and also mentioning Elizabeth Bowen.
- Michael Lewis's book Moneyball: The Art of Winning an Unfair Game cites Connolly at the top of the first chapter – "Whom the gods wish to destroy they first call promising." (Enemies of Promise)
- Donna Tartt's novel The Secret History references Cyril Connolly in Chapter 5-"...Cyril Connolly, who was notorious for being a hard guest to please...".
- In William Boyd's James Bond novel Solo, Bond recalls Connolly's description of Chelsea as "that tranquil cultivated spielraum... where I worked and wandered" (Connolly, Boyd and the fictional Bond all lived in Chelsea), although Bond can not remember the author of the quote.
- In An Englishman Abroad (1983) by Alan Bennett, Guy Burgess keeps asking Coral Browne "How is Cyril Connolly?"
- In Solomon Gursky Was Here (1989) by Mordecai Richler, Moses Berger, sorting his books as an excuse for not writing, finds his copy of The Unquiet Grave and reads "...the true function of a writer is to produce a masterpiece..." Muttering an imprecation, he throws the book across the room, but immediately retrieves it because of his regard for Connolly.
- Connolly makes an appearance as the 1940s editor of Horizon in Ian McEwan's 2022 novel Lessons.

== Works ==
- The Rock Pool, 1935 (novel)
- Enemies of Promise, 1938
- The Unquiet Grave, 1944
- The Condemned Playground, 1945 (collection)
- The Missing Diplomats, 1952
- The Golden Horizon, 1953 (editor; compilation from Horizon)
- Ideas and Places, 1953 (collection)
- Les Pavillons: French Pavilions of the Eighteenth Century, 1962 (with Jerome Zerbe)
- Previous Convictions, 1963 (collection)
- The Modern Movement: 100 Key Books From England, France, and America, 1880–1950, 1965
- The Evening Colonnade 1973 (collection)
- A Romantic Friendship, 1975 (letters to Noel Blakiston)
- Cyril Connolly: Journal and Memoir, 1983 (edited by David Pryce-Jones)
- The Selected Essays of Cyril Connolly, 1984 (edited by Peter Quennell)
- Shade Those Laurels, 1990 (fiction, completed by Peter Levi)
- The Selected Works of Cyril Connolly, 2002 (edited by Matthew Connolly), Volume One: The Modern Movement; Volume Two: The Two Natures
