= 25 North Colonnade =

Building in Canary Wharf, London

Coordinates: 51°30′20.8″N 00°01′12.5″W

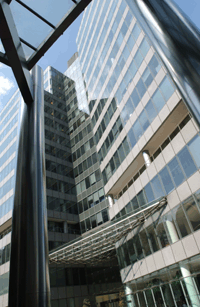
- Interactive map of the 25 North Colonnade area

General information
- Status: Completed
- Type: Office
- Location: Canary Wharf; London, E14; United Kingdom
- Completed: 1991
- Opening: 1991

Height
- Roof: 80 m (262 ft)

Technical details
- Floor count: 15

Design and construction
- Architect: Troughton McAslan
- Developer: Canary Wharf Group

Website
- www.cargolondon.co.uk/the-building/

25 North Colonnade is a commercial building in Canary Wharf, London formerly occupied by the Financial Conduct Authority, after having been solely occupied by its predecessor, the Financial Services Authority (FSA) until early 2013. It is 80 metres (262 ft) tall, with 15 floors. Built in 1991, its developer was the Canary Wharf Group, and its architect was Troughton McAslan.

== See also ==
- Canary Wharf
- Tall buildings in London
