= The Colonnade =

Building in Toronto

Coordinates: 43.668705°N 79.392235°W

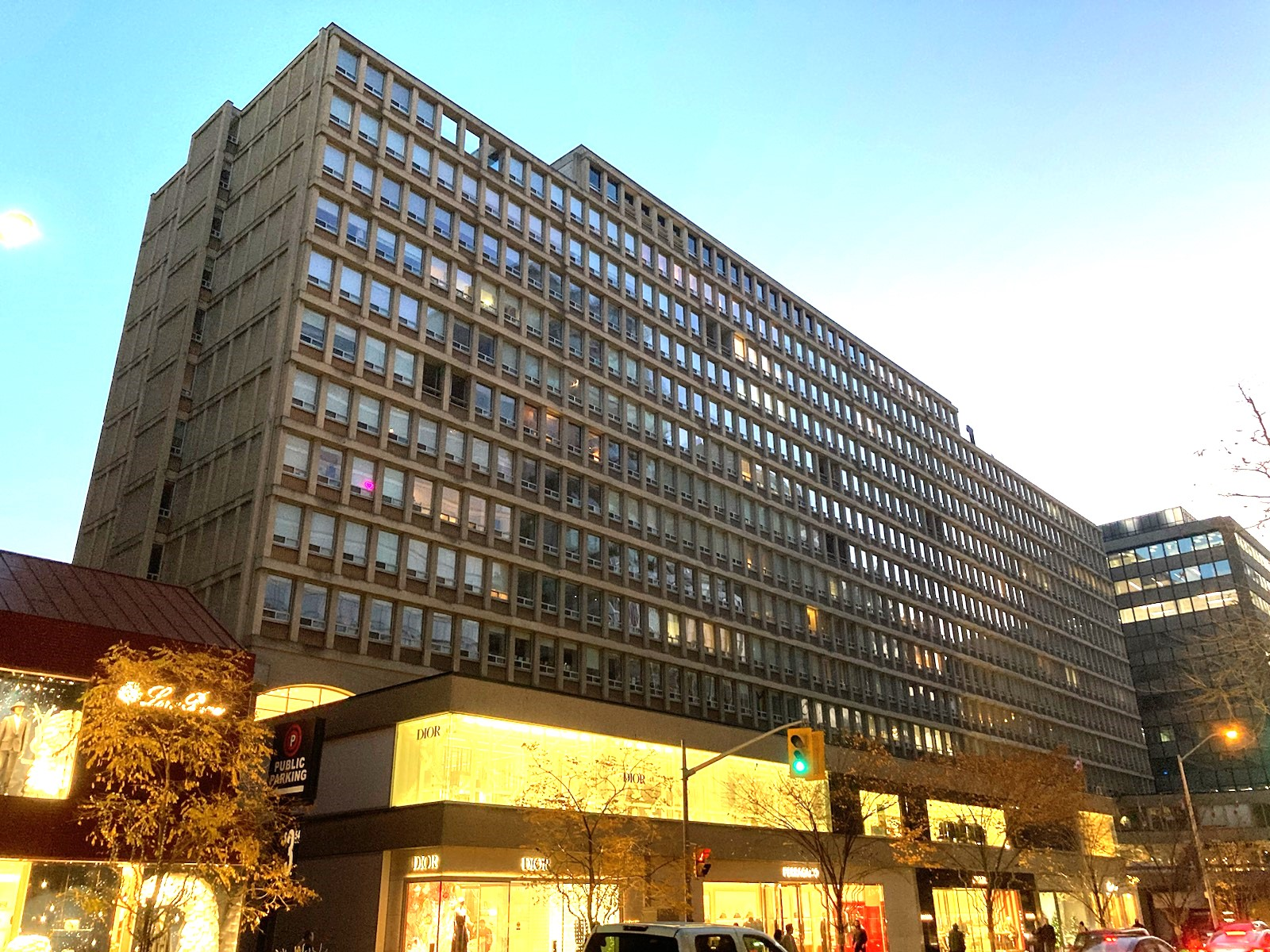

General information
- Location: Toronto, Ontario
- Address: 131 Bloor Street West
- Opened: 16 October 1963

Technical details
- Floor count: 14

Design and construction
- Architect(s): Gerald Robinson
- Architecture firm: Tampõld and Wells

The Colonnade is a 14-storey mixed-use building in Toronto, Ontario. The building was conceived in 1959 by architect Gerald Robinson, whose design was influenced by the work of Le Corbusier. Construction began in 1961 and the building opened in the fall of 1963, though it was not completed until the spring of 1964. The building occupies a property owned by Victoria University that was leased in 1961 for 100 years. When it opened, the building contained stores, a theatre, offices, and apartments. The Colonnade is one of the earliest examples of brutalist architecture in Canada.

== History and design ==
In 1959, architect Gerald Robinson (1930–2024) and engineer Irwin Burns (1925–2016) met at a Toronto Film Society programme. The men had a coffee at the end of the evening and talked about the decline of cities and how to revitalise them. The following morning, a real estate developer named Murray Webber (1930–2008) telephoned Burns to tell him about a property on Bloor Street, owned by Victoria University, that was available for long-term lease and development. At noon that day, Burns went to Bloor to look at the property. By chance, he ran into Robinson on the street. As the two examined the property, Burns said, "there is the place to demonstrate what we talked about last night."

Burns and Webber formed a corporation called One Thirty One Bloor West Limited, of which Burns was the president and general manager. The corporation owned half the project, while the other half was owned by Arthur Minden (1910–1966). In Robinson's telling, "the inspiration came from Burns, the respectability from Webber, and the money from Minden." The group's proposal won out over 25 other projects submitted to Victoria University for the site. Burns and Webber announced the project on 5 October 1961. The 100-year lease they acquired from Victoria was the largest ground lease in the city's history. The developers built The Colonnade in conjunction with Britannica House at 151 Bloor, which sits on the same parcel. Shortly after the project got underway, Minden sold his half-stake to the Rubin Corporation, which became Revenue Properties later.

Gerald Robinson served as architect for the project, while Tampõld and Wells were the associate architects. Norbert Seethaler was the structural engineer, John Garay Associates were the mechanical engineers, and Ellard Wilson Associates were the electrical engineers. Sasaki-Strong Associates served as landscape architects.

Mayor Donald Summerville opened The Colonnade on 16 October 1963. At the time of the opening, the building was incomplete. Construction continued until April 1964.

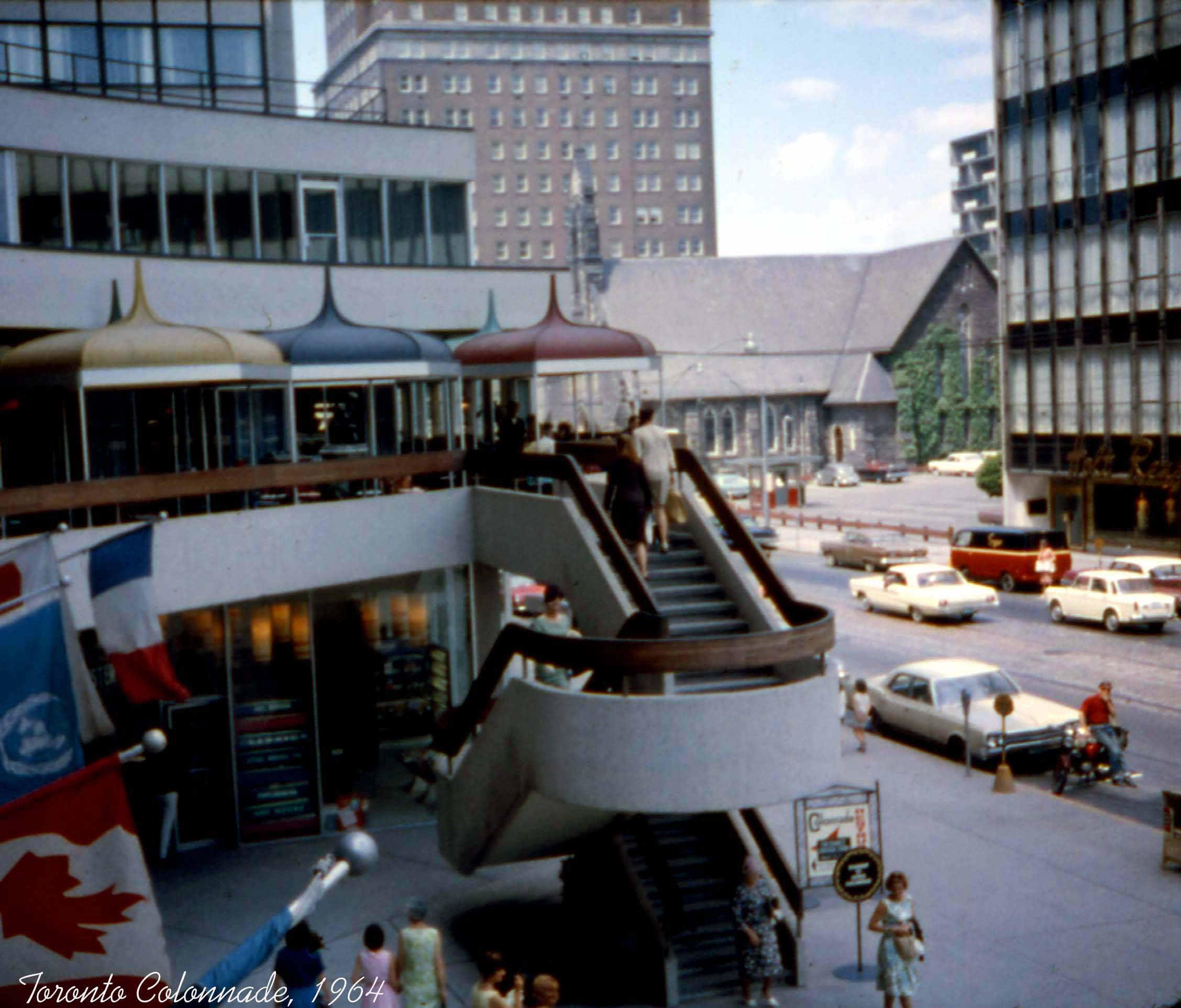
The forecourt facing Bloor Street

Robinson drew inspiration from the concept that Le Corbusier used in his Unité d'habitation projects. The main block of the structure sits on a 20-foot column grid, and is 16 bays long and three bays wide. The first three storeys form the base of the structure and terminate in arches below the fourth floor. An article in The Canadian Architect compared Robinson's treatment of the arches to those of a Gothic cathedral. On either side, a two-storey podium that is two bays deep extends from the main block. Both sides of the podium include semi-elliptical cutaways that form forecourts. In the front forecourt, a floating staircase leads to a terrace on the second floor deck.

Below ground there are two levels of parking. The three-storey base has shops at street level and on the second floor, while the third floor serves as a mechanical area. Originally, the second floor included a 190-seat theatre called the Colonnade Theatre. Previously, Burns had served as producer for the Arts Theatre Club. The first play to run at The Colonnade Theatre was Before Compiegne, which was written by Jack Winter and opened on 3 April 1964. The play was directed by George Luscombe of Toronto Workshop Productions.

The fourth and fifth floors of the main block were offices originally. Floors 6-13 are apartments, and two of the 13th floor units extend to the 14th floor penthouse. Both penthouse units include open terraces, one of which has a pool. When it opened, the 164 apartments ranged in price from $110 to $1,400 per month. Over the years, The Colonnade's residents included performers Jan Rubeš and Susan Douglas Rubeš, Simpsons chairman G. Allan Burton, lawyer Ronald Rolls, professor Thomas Howarth, judge Hugh Foster, member of parliament Marvin Gelber, and literary agent Beverley Slopen.

Robinson believed The Colonnade should have served as a template for new downtown developments. He said, "the whole city should be like this. [...] The principles we have used here will be needed in any downtown development if it is not to be dehumanized. Do you want something like Place Ville Marie where the great towers stand empty at night and the shops are below ground?"

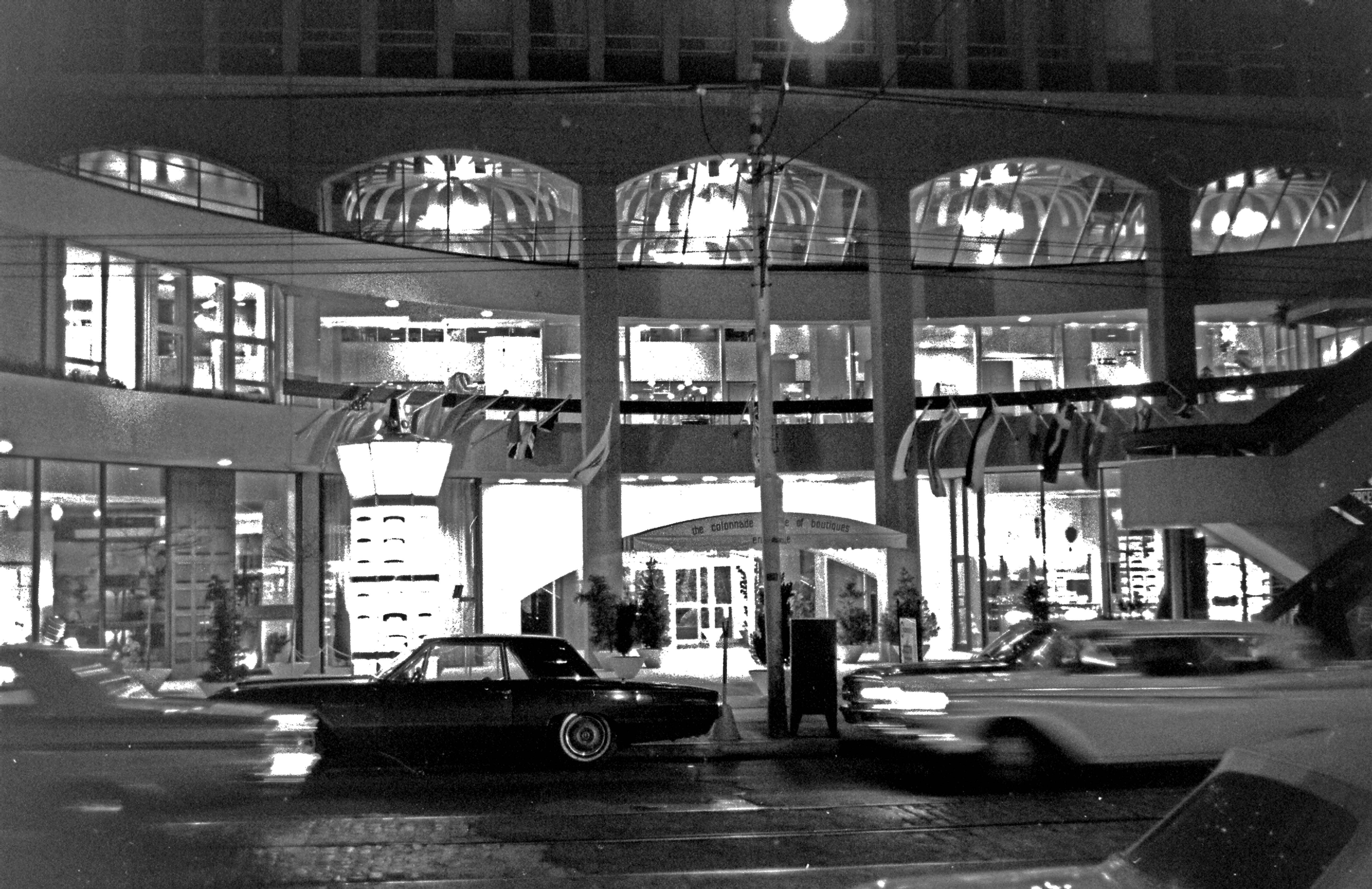
The Bloor Street entrance at night.

The Globe and Mail's architecture critic, Adele Freedman, wrote later that

in the mid-sixties, when it opened, the Colonnade was Bloor Street. If you lived anywhere near, or even if you didn't, it became part of your life, somewhere that you could wind up or down depending on your mood. Along with Holt Renfrew across the street, the Lothian Mews and Cakemaster, all since relocated, the Colonnade spelled civilization. Toronto's urban chic entertained in the apartments, University of Toronto students drank expresso at the Jack and Jill, and various and sundry came to fondle the merchandise. When guests came to town, it was the place to take them for a gawk and squawk.

A few years after The Colonnade was completed, Webber and Burns sold their half-share of the building to Revenue Properties, making the latter the outright owner. By the mid-1970s, the mixed-use concept it had pioneered had been repeated widely, thus reducing its uniqueness and prestige. In 1977, architects Jack and Raji Shukla designed a renovation. Revenue proposed to turn the apartments into a hotel in 1983, though after facing resistance from tenants, the plan was cancelled. In the mid-1980s Henno Sillaste designed a renovation of the lobby. Architecture critic Christopher Hume of the Toronto Star wrote of the various renovations, "sadly, the Colonnade was made over during the 1980s in the glitzy manner then in vogue. That meant a lot of shiny surfaces and metallic finishes, none of it appropriate to this gently brutalist structure."

In November 1983, The Colonnade was added to the city's heritage register.
