= The Unquiet Grave (book) =

1944 book by Cyril Connolly

First edition (publ. Curwen Press for Horizon)

The Unquiet Grave is a literary work by Cyril Connolly written in 1944 under the pseudonym Palinurus. It comprises a collection of aphorisms, quotes, nostalgic musings and mental explorations. Together with Enemies of Promise (1938), it is one of the two books for which the author is mainly remembered.

Palinurus was the pilot of Aeneas's ship in Virgil's Aeneid, who fell overboard as an act of atonement to the angry gods, and whose spirit wandered in the underworld. Connolly uses the theme to explore his feelings and review his situation as he approaches the age of forty presenting a very pessimistic and self-deprecating account. Into this he brings quotes from some of his favourite authors: Pascal, De Quincey, Chamfort and Flaubert as well as snatches from the Buddha, Chinese philosophy and Freud.

The book's title is taken from an English folk song of the same name:

The twelvemonth and a day being up,
The dead began to speak:
'Oh who sits weeping on my grave,
And will not let me sleep?'

The book is in four parts entitled Ecce Gubernator ("Here is the pilot"), Te Palinure Petens ("Looking for you, Palinurus"), La Clé des Chants ("The key of songs") and Who was Palinurus. The first two contain similar sets of musing, while the third contains more recollections with veiled references to Connolly's life in France. The last gives an account of Palinurus's history.

== Quotes ==
- "The more books we read, the sooner we perceive that the true function of a writer is to produce a masterpiece and that no other task is of any consequence." (often quoted in the form "The true function of a writer is to produce a masterpiece and no other task is of any consequence").
- "There is no pain in life equal to that which two lovers can inflict on each other."
- "When I contemplate the accumulation of guilt and remorse which, like a garbage-can, I carry through life, and which is fed not only by the lightest actions, but by the most harmless pleasure, I feel man to be of all living things the most biologically incompetent and ill-organized."
- "A lazy person, whatever the talents with which he starts forth, will have condemned himself to second-hand thoughts, and to second-rate friends."
- "Beneath a mask of selfish tranquility nothing exists except bitterness and boredom. I am one of those whom suffering has made empty and frivolous: each night in my dreams I pull the scab off a wound; each day, vacuous and habit-ridden, I help it re-form."
- "'Dry again?' said the Crab to the Rock-Pool. 'So would you be,' replied the Rock-Pool, 'if you had to satisfy, twice a day, the insatiable sea."
- "Morning tears return; spirits at their lowest ebb. Approaching forty, sense of total failure; not a writer but a ham actor whose performance is clotted with egotism; dust and ashes; 'brilliant'. - that is not worth doing. Never will I make that extra effort to live according to reality which alone makes good writing possible: hence the manic-depressiveness of my style,—which is either bright, cruel and superficial; or pessimistic; moth-eaten with self-pity."
- "Life is a maze in which we take the wrong turning before we have learnt to walk."
- "No city should be too large for a man to walk out of in a morning."
- "Everything is a dangerous drug to me except reality, which is unendurable."
- "Imprisoned in every fat man a thin one is wildly signalling to be let out." (used previously by George Orwell)
- "The river of truth is always splitting up into arms that reunite. Islanded between them, the inhabitants argue for a lifetime as to which is the mainstream."
- "The dread of loneliness is keener than the threat of bondage; and so we marry, again and again."
- "Those of us who were brought up as Christians and have lost our faith have retained the sense of sin without the saving belief in redemption. This poisons our thought and so paralyses us in action."
- "Imagine a cow or a pig which rejected the body for a ‘noble eight-fold way of self-enlightenment'. One would feel that the beast had made a false calculation."
