= Official List =

List of securities maintained by the UK FCA

The Official List (or UKLA Official List) is the list of securities maintained by the British Financial Conduct Authority (acting in its capacity as the UK Listing Authority). The list indicates the listing category of the listed securities and if they have a premium listing or standard listing.

The Official List is a list of securities issued by companies for the purpose of those securities being traded on a UK regulated market for the instruments listed in Section B of the Annex to the Investment Services Directive. An example of a UK regulated market is the London Stock Exchange's Main Market.

The list is updated several times a day between 8am and 6.05pm UK time; it will include details of listed securities such as description, country of origin and market status.

The list is held in accordance with Section 74(1) of the British Financial Services and Markets Act 2000 for the purposes of Part VI of the Act. This list was previously maintained by the Financial Services Authority until it was dissolved in 2012.

The FCA (along with the Prudential Regulation Authority) was formerly part of the Financial Services Authority.
