= Cressida Connolly =

English novelist

Cressida Connolly FRSL
- Born: 14 January 1960 (age 66); Sussex, England
- Occupations: Novelist, biographer, journalist and critic
- Spouse(s): A. A. Gill (m.1982–1983); Charles Hudson (m. 1985)
- Children: 3, including Nell
- Parent(s): Cyril Connolly and Deirdre Levi

Cressida Connolly FRSL (born 14 January 1960) is an English novelist, biographer, journalist and critic. She is also the mother of English actress Nell Hudson.

== Personal life ==
Connolly grew up in Sussex, England. She is the only daughter of the critic and writer Cyril Connolly (died 26 November 1974). Her mother, Deirdre Levi, is the widow of the poet and writer Peter Levi (died 1 February 2000).

Connolly was the first wife (1982–1983) of The Sunday Times critic and writer A. A. Gill (died 10 December 2016). She married Worcestershire petal farmer Charles Hudson in 1985; the couple have three children, including actress Nell Hudson.

== Career ==
Connolly has written book reviews and occasional journalism for Vogue, The Spectator, The Times, The Oldie, Literary Review, The Daily Telegraph and The Guardian. Her interview subjects have included the writers Maya Angelou, Alice Munro, Michael Ondaatje and Elizabeth Strout.

She has written, curated and lectured on Ladybird Books, and appeared on BBC Radio 4 and BBC Television, talking about her collection and the artists whose work illustrated the books and whom she befriended. Her introduction of Ladybird artist Harry Wingfield to The New Art Gallery, Walsall, led to an exhibition and to the acquisition of the artist's studio.

Connolly is the author of a collection of short stories, The Happiest Days, which won the PEN Macmillan Award; a biography of the Garman family, The Rare and The Beautiful; and a novel, My Former Heart, which won a special commendation from the Society of Authors. Her second novel, After the Party, was selected as a Waterstones Book of the Month and shortlisted for the Walter Scott Prize in 2019.

Connolly was interviewed by Mariella Frostrup about her novel After the Party for Open Book on BBC Radio 4 and the novel was selected on Radio 4's A Good Read.

In 2020, Connolly was elected a fellow of the Royal Society of Literature.

Her third novel, Bad Relations, was published in 2022. The Times called it "her latest understated masterpiece", "beautiful" and "a ravishing novel"; while Country Life wrote that: "The novels of Cressida Connolly are a wonderful discovery" and "nostalgic, perceptively portrayed and beautifully written." The Observer described it as "haunting and beautiful", concluding: "I don't often wish a book were longer, but this one I did."

== Published works ==
- The Happiest Days – Fourth Estate, 1999, ISBN 1-85702-683-7
- The Rare and the Beautiful – Fourth Estate, 2004, ISBN 1-84115-633-7
- My Former Heart – Fourth Estate, 2011, ISBN 978-0-00-728711-6
- After the Party – Penguin Books, 2018, ISBN 978-0-241-32724-1
- Bad Relations - Penguin Books, 2022, ISBN 978-0-241-53770-1
