= G Plan =

British furniture and upholstery manufacturer

G Plan is a British furniture brand. It began as a pioneering range of furniture in the United Kingdom produced by E Gomme Ltd of High Wycombe. The success of G Plan led to E Gomme becoming one of the UK's largest furniture manufacturers, with profits increasing sixfold between 1952 and 1958 when it was floated as an IPO. Since 2005, G Plan has been a subsidiary of Sofa Brands International.

== History ==
The company was founded in High Wycombe in 1898 by Ebeneezer Gomme, at first making hand-made chairs, and building a factory at Leigh Street in 1909. By 1922 there were 300 employees, and a second factory was opened in 1927 at Spring Gardens, next to the railway line. From 1943, during World War II, furniture sales were controlled by rationing; the Board of Trade set up the Utility scheme which limited the types of furniture on sale and their cost, and a small number of simple designs were available in oak or mahogany. The ending of this scheme in December 1952, combined with the 1951 Festival of Britain, led to a pent-up demand for more modern furniture.

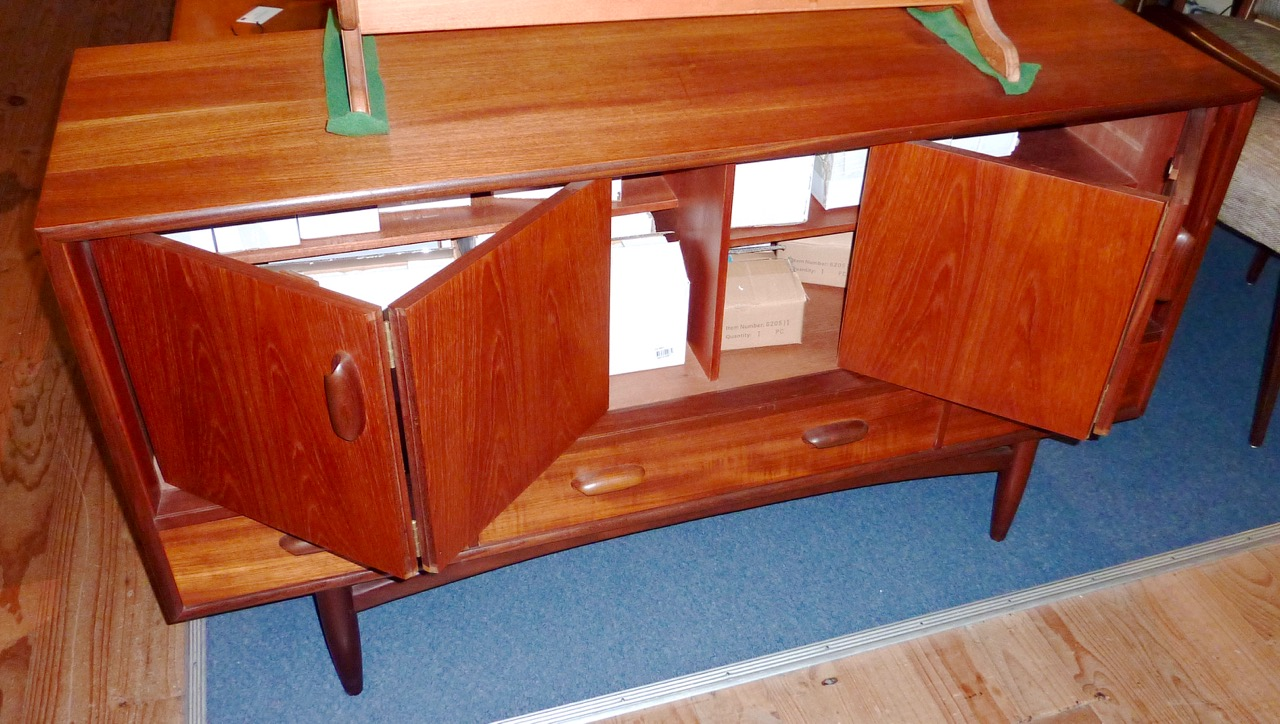
G Plan teak and afrormosia sideboard, with doors open

In 1953, Donald Gomme, the designer at E Gomme, decided to produce a range of modern furniture for the entire house which could be bought piece-by-piece according to budgets. Advertising was part of the plan from the beginning. The name was coined by Doris Gundry of the J. Walter Thompson advertising agency, and the furniture was advertised in magazines and in cinemas direct to the public. Designs were available for several years so people could collect them slowly. All furniture was marked with a distinctive brand mark.

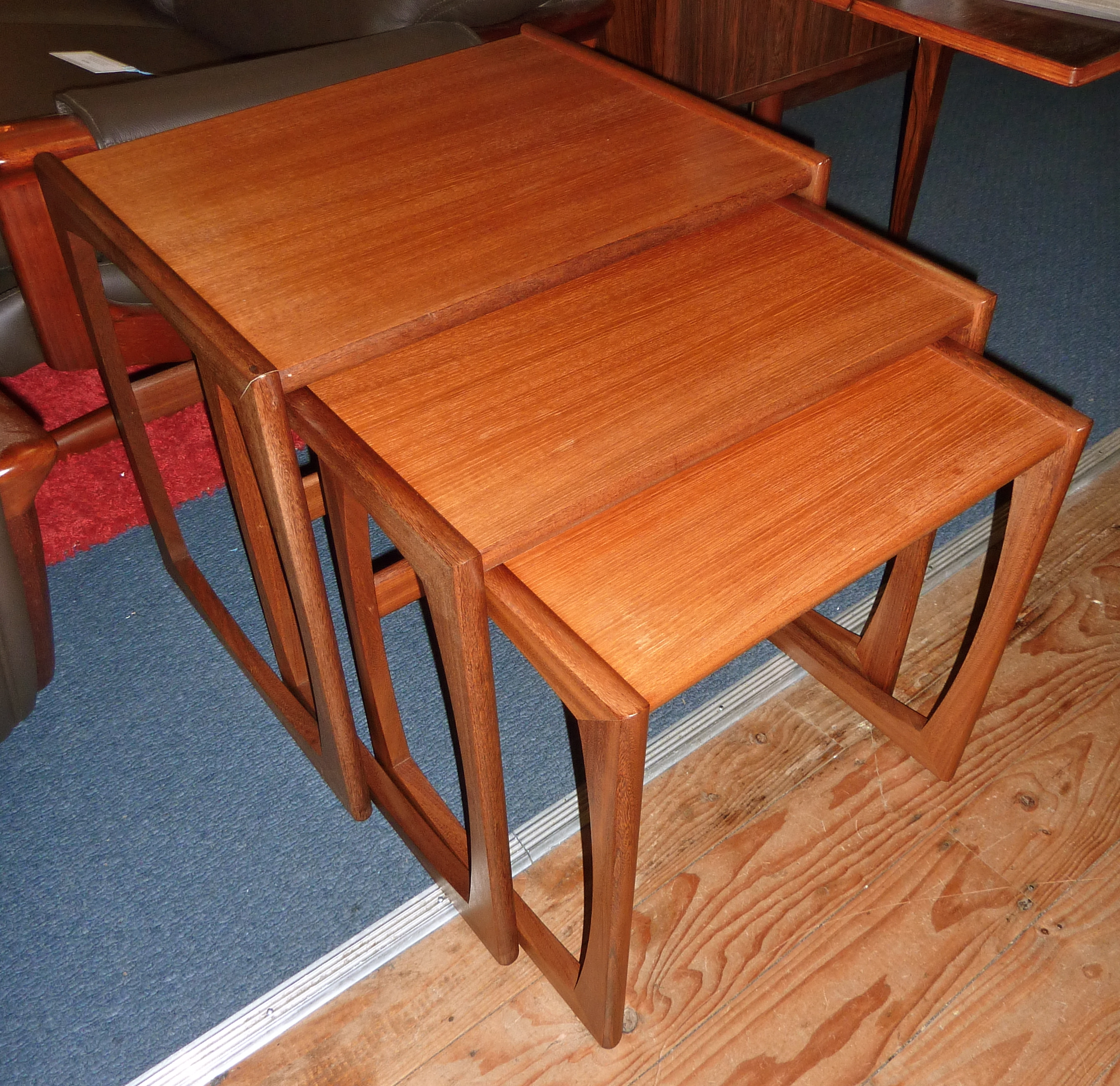
G Plan Quadrille nest of three tables, in teak and afrormosia

Another part of the direct marketing was the showrooms where the public could see the furniture. There were small centres in the country, and "The G Plan Gallery" in Vogue House, St George Street, Hanover Square in London. Donald Gomme left the company in 1958, perhaps the peak of the company's success.

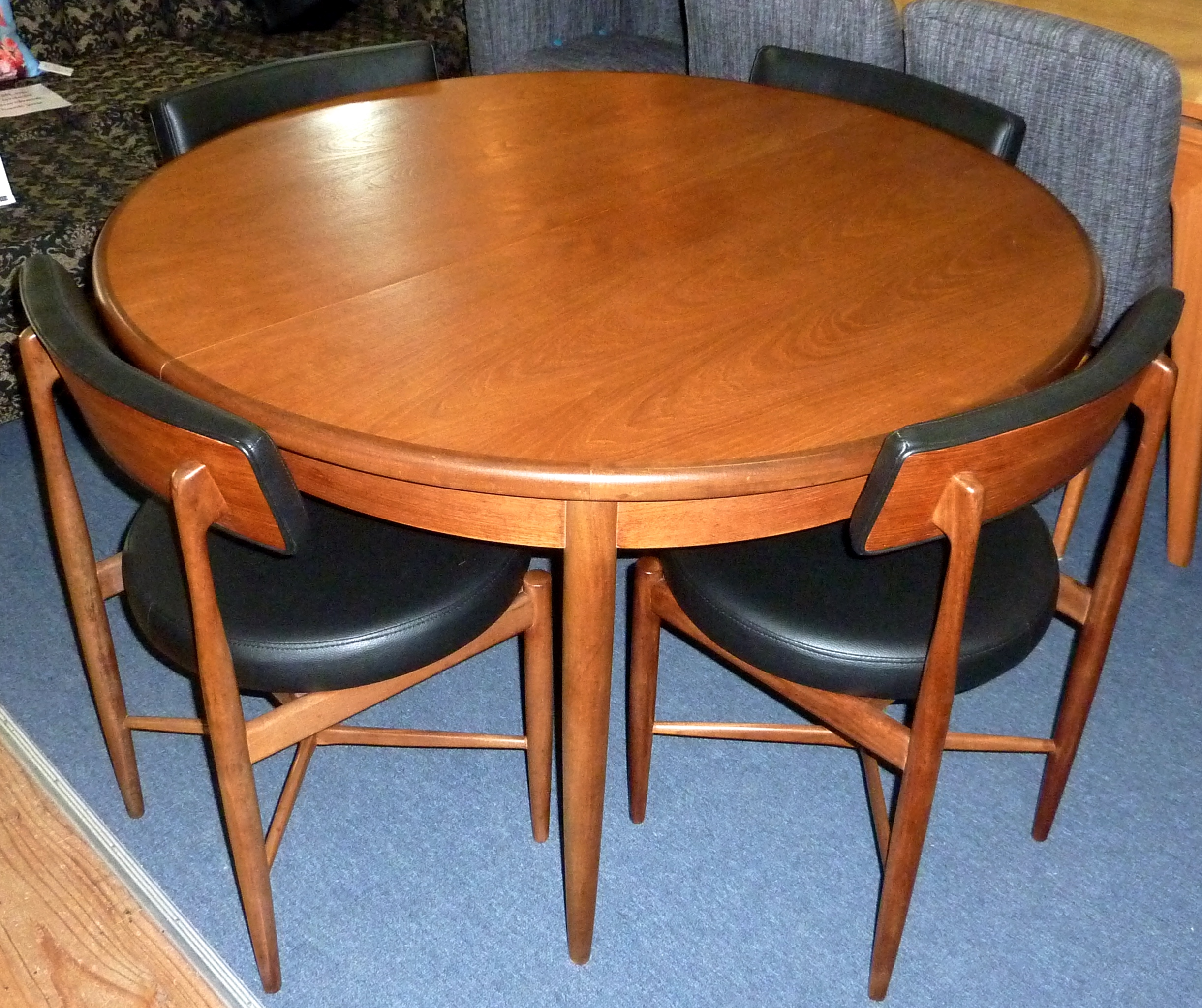
V B Wilkins-designed Fresco dining setting by G Plan, circa 1960s

In the early 1960s the government introduced restrictions on hire purchase (the most common method of purchasing furniture), and in response to competition from Danish furniture the company introduced a Danish Modern range (designed by Ib Kofod-Larsen), which made the rest of the range seem dated. Gomme lost their market-leading position, though they continued to be a major manufacturer making innovative designs with a very well known brand name.

In 1987 the Gomme family – major shareholders in the company – decided to retire. They sold the business to the then directors, who, three years later, sold it to the Christie Tyler group of companies. In 1996 the Morris Furniture Group acquired the licence to make and market G Plan Cabinet furniture in Glasgow, operating separately to the upholstery business. G Plan Upholstery Ltd, now based at a modern factory and offices near Melksham, Wiltshire, continues to manufacture most of its sofa and armchair products in the UK.

== Acquisition by Sofa Brands ==
Following the 2005 collapse of Christie Tyler, G Plan was acquired by Sofa Brands International, a holding company, alongside the Parker Knoll and Duresta upholstery brands. G Plan Cabinets was sold by Morris to Sofa Brands in 2015, and cabinet manufacturing ceased.

Sofa Brands was acquired in 2015 by its management team and Promethean Investments, a private equity firm. In the same year the company moved its registered office to G Plan's Melksham address. As of 2017, G Plan was a wholly owned subsidiary of Sofa Brands International.

== Sources ==
- Basil Hyman; Steven Braggs. The G-Plan Revolution: A Celebration of British Popular Furniture of the 1950s and 1960s. ISBN 1-86154-310-7.
