= Parker Knoll =

British furniture manufacturer

Parker Knoll is a British furniture manufacturing company, formed in 1931 by British furniture manufacturer Frederick Parker and Willi Knoll, a German inventor of a new form of sprung furniture. With roots in the manufacture of high-quality furniture, the brand concentrated on mass-market products from the 1930s to the 1990s. The company was listed on the London Stock Exchange in 1950, but taken private and delisted in 2004. After financial difficulties, it was acquired out of administration by Sofa Brands International.

== Frederick Parker ==
Frederick Parker was born in Shoreditch, East London in 1845. He started in business as a chair maker in 1869, after an apprenticeship at his father's furniture factory. He decided to concentrate on making high quality furniture by hand. After working initially in London, Parker moved to High Wycombe – a historic centre of the furniture trade in England – in 1898. Part of the business was to make furniture for ocean liners, including the Palladian Lounge of Cunard's RMS Aquitania. The company also supplied the P&O liner SS Ophir, which was commissioned as a royal yacht, HMS Ophir, in 1901 to carry the Duke and Duchess of Cornwall and York (the future King George V and Queen Mary) to Australia. Parker also made furniture for the Viceroy's House in New Delhi, and a carved throne for Emperor of Ethiopia Haile Selassie. The business was incorporated as a limited company, Frederick Parker and Sons Limited, in 1904. Frederick's son, Tom Parker, later took over the business.

== Willi Knoll ==
Willi Knoll was born in Germany and served as a fighter pilot in World War I. His experience of uncomfortable seating in his fighter plane was the inspiration for his invention of a new form of sprung furniture, with a coiled steel wire string system across the seat and back, which he manufactured in Stuttgart. Knoll came to Britain in 1929 to find a manufacturer for his chairs using his patent.

== Parker Knoll ==
After Frederick Parker's son, Tom, saw a sample of Knoll's chairs at Heal & Son, the two businesses quickly formed a new company, Parker Knoll, which was launched at the British Industries Fair in February 1931.

The new venture was soon successful, with advertisements in The Daily Mail and The Daily Telegraph selling low-price tension-sprung furniture in a variety of basic designs. They also provided furniture for the BBC's Broadcasting House in Portland Place, and Cunard's RMS Queen Mary. Increasing demand led to the construction of a new factory in High Wycombe to a design commissioned from Wallis, Gilbert & Partners in 1935; it was destroyed in a fire in 1970.

During the Second World War, the company manufactured A-frames, wooden boxes, and wings for the de Havilland Mosquito, and also repaired gliders, returning to furniture manufacturing after the war. The company was listed on the London Stock Exchange in 1950. The company's reclining chairs became a signature item during the 1960s. The parent company became Cornwell Parker plc in 1988, and acquired many other furniture manufacturers.

== 21st century ==
The group was acquired by Silentnight Holdings Plc in 2000, and taken private by a company controlled by the Clarke family (the founders of Silentnight) in 2004. It was bought from Silentnight by Christie-Tyler in March 2005, but Christie-Tyler collapsed into administration within months due to unpaid debts resulting from the financial problems of Courts in November 2004 and Allders in January 2005. It was acquired out of the administration of Christie-Tyler in July 2005 by Sofa Brands International, established by Christie-Tyler's former chief executive Scott Malvenan. Sofa Brands International also acquired other brands including G Plan, Derwent Upholstery, Duresta, Collins & Hayes and Leabrooks Upholstery.

The company had opened a factory in Chipping Norton in the 1960s, which was closed in 2003. Other factories in Andover and Bridgend were also closed in that year. Since 2016, the company has been based in Sutton-in-Ashfield, Nottinghamshire.

== Frederick Parker Foundation ==
When Parker Knoll decided to sell its archive in 1997, a charity – the Frederick Parker Foundation – was established to acquire 170 chairs, 150 carvings and the Frederick Parker Company archive, to maintain as an archive of furniture design and manufacture. The collection is on long-term loan to a dedicated gallery at the London Metropolitan University's resource centre, Metropolitan Works.
