= Enemies of Promise =

1938 book by Cyril Connolly

- First edition (UK)
- Author: Cyril Connolly
- Language: English
- Genre: Literary criticism Autobiography
- Publisher: George Routledge & Sons
- Publication date: 1938
- Publication place: United Kingdom

Enemies of Promise is a critical and autobiographical work by English writer Cyril Connolly published in 1938, later enlarged when it was first reprinted in 1948. Together with The Unquiet Grave (1944), it is one of the two books for which the author is mainly remembered.

It comprises three parts, the first dedicated to Connolly's observations about English literature and the English literary world of his time, the second a list of adverse elements that affect the ability to be a good writer and the last an account of Connolly's early life. The overarching theme of the book is the search for understanding why Connolly, though he was widely recognised as a leading man of letters and a highly distinguished critic, failed to produce a major work of literature.

== Part 1 "Predicament" ==
This part consists of an erudite discussion of literary styles, with Connolly posing the question of what the following ten years would bring in the world of literature and what sort of writing would last. He summarises the two main styles as follows:

We have seen that there are two styles which it is convenient to describe as the realist, or vernacular, the style of rebels, journalists, common-sense addicts, and unromantic observers of human destiny – and the Mandarin, the artificial style of men of letters or of those in authority who make letters their spare time occupation.

His examples of exponents of the Mandarin style include Lytton Strachey, Virginia Woolf, Marcel Proust, Aldous Huxley and James Joyce, the dominant literary character of the 1920s. Examples of vernacular or realist exponents include Ernest Hemingway, Somerset Maugham, Christopher Isherwood and George Orwell, the dominant force in the 1930s.

== Part 2 "The Charlock's Shade" ==
Connolly quotes a few lines of The Village by George Crabbe, poet and naturalist, which describe the weeds which choke the rye. He uses this as an analogy for the factors that can stifle a writer's creativity. The blue bugloss represents journalism, particularly when pursued out of economic necessity. Thistles represent politics, particularly relevant in the left-wing literary atmosphere of the 1930s. Poppies are used to cover all forms of escapism, and it is in this chapter that Connolly dwells on the tyranny of "promise" as the burden of expectation. Charlock is a representation of sex, with the most problematic aspects being, on the one hand, homosexuality and, on the other, the tares of domesticity. Finally, the Slimy Mallows represent success, the most insidious enemy of literature.

Connolly then explores what positive advice can be given on how to produce a work of literature that lasts ten years. Working through all the forms, he identifies those for which there is a future.

== Part 3 "A Georgian Boyhood" ==
The last part is an autobiographical outline of his life until he left Eton at 18. Most of the material relates to his life at Eton, with two preceding chapters. He comments:

Somewhere in the facts I have recorded lurk the causes of that sloth by which I have been disabled, somewhere lies the sin whose guilt is at my door, increased by compound interest faster than promise, and through them run those romantic ideas and fallacies, those errors of judgement against which the validity of my criticism must be measured.

In "The Branching Ogham", Connolly describes his early life as a single child living variously with his army father in South Africa, his aunt at Clontarf Castle in Ireland and with his grandmother in England. His grandmother spoilt him and at his early school he notes he was popular "for I had embarked on the career which was to occupy me for the next ten years of trying to be funny". As a child in Ireland he had a sympathy for the romantic vision of Irish nationalism but was unable to live the part.

"White Samite" is his recollection of his schooldays at St Wulfric's, where the ethos of "character" (integrity and a sense of duty) went hand in hand with romanticism in literature. He absorbed the "purple patch" approach to literature but rejected "character" inspired in different ways by Cecil Beaton and George Orwell. He wrote "year by year, the air, the discipline, the teaching, the association with other boys and the driving will of Flip took effect on me": he became a popular wit and achieved a scholarship to Eton.

Connolly's first two years at Eton he recalls as the "Dark Ages", where he was subjected to arbitrary beatings and bullying, which affected his nerves, and he got a bad report. He eventually established a friendship with one of his tormentors Godfrey Meynell, a boy of an identical background but who instead followed a military career and won a posthumous Victoria Cross on the North West Frontier. Another senior with whom he established rapport was Roger Mynors. "I was now fifteen, dirty, inky, miserable, untidy, a bad fag, a coward at games, lazy at work, unpopular with my masters and superiors, anxious to curry favour and yet to bully whom I dared."

"Renaissance" marks a settled period for Connolly at the end of his second year establishing his popularity and friendship with others with a shared interest in literature, Dadie Rylands among others. It includes the start of a semi-romantic brother substitute friendship with "Nigel". The chapter digresses into extensive details of school personalities, politics and intrigues, an insight into the world of Eton. "The art of getting on at school depends on a mixture of enthusiasm with moral cowardice and social sense". The chapter concludes with Connolly's "first trip abroad" to Paris and a mortifying experience when he was lured into a brothel.

The "Background of the Lilies" refers to the pre-Raphaelite culture in vogue at Eton and discusses the contributions to Connolly's development of five key teachers, including Hugh Macnaughten, "an ogre for the purple patch", who personified the romantic pre-Raphaelite tradition and the ruling philosophy of Platonism, and headmaster Cyril Alington, a worldly teacher with the cult of light verse such as Winthrop Mackworth Praed and Eton's own J. K. Stephen. Connolly's criticism is expressed: "For the culture of the lilies, rooted in the past, divorced from reality, and dependent on a dead foreign tongue, was by nature sterile.... The arts at Eton were under a blight". Headlam, the history teacher "whose sober intellectual background... offered a gleam of mental health" impressed him and encouraged his concentration on history. The chapter ends, "By the time I left Eton I knew by heart something of the literature of five civilizations", and Connolly gives review of each.

"Glittering Prizes" describes how Connolly wins the Rosebery History Prize, which enhances his reputation and brings him closer to Oppidans (Eton students who live in the town rather than on the school grounds) and aristocratic members of the prestigious club Pop, like Alec Dunglass, a future Prime Minister, and Antony Knebworth, a viscount. He spends a Christmas holiday with mother at Mürren. Indulging in intense study, reading late by candlelight, he goes for a history scholarship to Balliol. He wins the scholarship and by careful politics manages to have himself elected to Pop "because he was amusing". The chapter concludes with a holiday in France with a friend, after a brief visit to St Wulfrics. After an embarrassing incident at the Folies Bergère, the couple head to the south of France and the Spanish border, to return so penniless that Connolly spends a night in the kip at St Martin-in-the-Fields.

"Vale" describes Connolly's comfortable last term with the scholarship in the bag and all the privileges of Pop, but demonstrates a feeling of ennui: "all my own attempts to write were doomed to failure. I didn't see how one could write well in English and my Greek and Latin were still not good enough.... College politics were now less exciting, for we were not in opposition but in office.... I hated history by now, it stank of success, and buried myself in the classics". He made a friendship with Brian Howard, but moral cowardice and academic outlook debarred him from making friends with Harold Acton, Oliver Messel, Robert Byron, Henry Green and Anthony Powell. He rounds up with conclusions on his education noting that as he was unable to write in any living language when he left Eton, he was already on the way to becoming a critic. His ambition was to be a poet, but he could not succeed. He complains that he was left with a fear of hubris: the revenge of a Jealous God which would counter the satisfaction of achievement, and a distrust of competition. "Never compete.... only in that way could the sin of Worldliness be combated, the Splendid Failure be prepared which was the ultimate 'gesture.... I could not imagine a moment when I should not be receiving marks for something.... Early laurels weigh like lead and of many of the boys whom I knew at Eton, I can say that their lives are over.... Once again romanticism with its death wish is to blame, for it lays an emphasis on childhood, on a fall from grace which is not compensated for by any doctrine of future redemption".

== Quotes ==
- "There is no more sombre enemy of good art than the pram in the hall."
- "All charming people have something to conceal, usually their total dependence on the appreciation of others."
- "Literature is the art of writing something that will be read twice; journalism what will be read at once."
- "Whom the gods wish to destroy they first call promising.
- "I was a stage rebel, Orwell a true one."
- "Were I to deduce any system from my feelings on leaving Eton, it might be called The Theory of Permanent Adolescence. It is the theory that the experiences undergone by boys at the great public schools, their glories and disappointments, are so intense as to dominate their lives and to arrest their development. From these it results that the greater part of the ruling class remains adolescent, school-minded, self-conscious, cowardly, sentimental, and in the last analysis homosexual." (In Inside the Whale, Orwell turned this quotation against contemporary writers, while omitting to mention that the two of them had been schoolmates: Orwell describes Enemies of Promise as "an account ...of life at a preparatory school and Eton in the years 1910-20", and said that Connolly was "merely speaking the truth, in an inverted fashion ... No wonder that the huge tribe known as ‘the right left people’ found it so easy to condone the purge-and-Ogpu side of the Russian régime and the horrors of the first Five-Year Plan. They were so gloriously incapable of understanding what it all meant.")
- "A votary of the esoteric Eton religion, the kind of graceful, tolerant, sleepy boy who is showered with favours and crowned with all the laurels, who is liked by the masters and admired by the boys without any apparent exertion on his part, without experiencing the ill-effects of success himself or arousing the pangs of envy in others. In the 18th century he would have become Prime Minister before he was 30 as it was, he appeared honourably ineligible for the struggle of life." (on Alec Douglas-Home, then Lord Dunglass)
