= George Orwell =

English author and journalist (1903–1950)

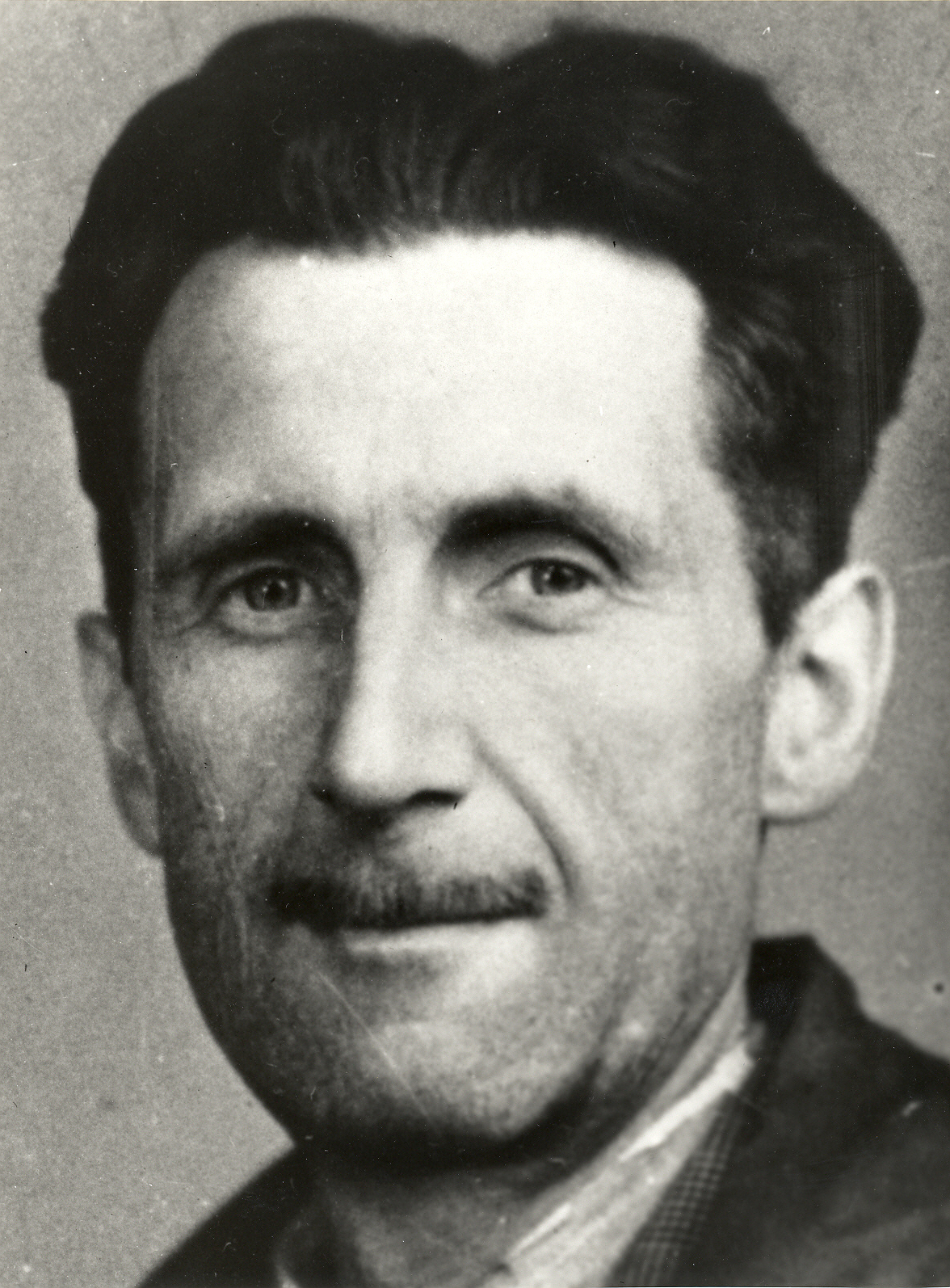
- Orwell in 1943
- Born: Eric Arthur Blair; 25 June 1903; Motihari, Bengal Presidency, India (modern-day Bihar)
- Died: 21 January 1950 (aged 46); London, England
- Burial place: All Saints' Church, Sutton Courtenay, Oxfordshire, England
- Education: Eton College
- Occupations: Novelist; essayist; journalist; literary critic
- Political party: Independent Labour (from 1938)
- Spouses: Eileen O'Shaughnessy (m. 1936; died 1945); Sonia Brownell (m. 1949)
- Children: Richard Blair (adopted)
- Writing career
- Pen name: George Orwell
- Language: English
- Years active: 1928–1949
- Genres: Dystopia; roman à clef; satire; literary criticism; polemic; opinion journalism
- Subjects: Anti-fascism; anti-Stalinism; anarchism; democratic socialism
- Notable works: Down and Out in Paris and London (1933); Burmese Days (1934); The Road to Wigan Pier (1937); Homage to Catalonia (1938); Animal Farm (1945); Nineteen Eighty-Four (1949)

Eric Arthur Blair (25 June 1903 – 21 January 1950) was an English novelist, poet, essayist, journalist, and critic who wrote under the pen name of George Orwell. His work is characterised by lucid prose, social criticism, opposition to all totalitarianism (both authoritarian communism and fascism), and support of democratic socialism.

Orwell is best known for his allegorical novella Animal Farm (1945) and the dystopian novel Nineteen Eighty-Four (1949), although his works also encompass literary criticism, poetry, fiction and polemical journalism. His non-fiction works, including The Road to Wigan Pier (1937), documenting his experience of working-class life in industrial Northern England, and Homage to Catalonia (1938), an account of his experiences soldiering for the Republican faction of the Spanish Civil War (1936–1939), are as critically respected as his essays on politics, literature, language and culture.

Orwell's work remains influential in both popular and political culture, with the adjective "Orwellian"—describing totalitarian and authoritarian social practices—becoming part of the English language, as are many of his neologisms, such as "Big Brother", "Thought Police", "Room 101", "Newspeak", "memory hole", "doublethink", and "thoughtcrime". In 2008, The Times named Orwell the second-greatest British writer since 1945.

== Biography ==
=== Early years ===
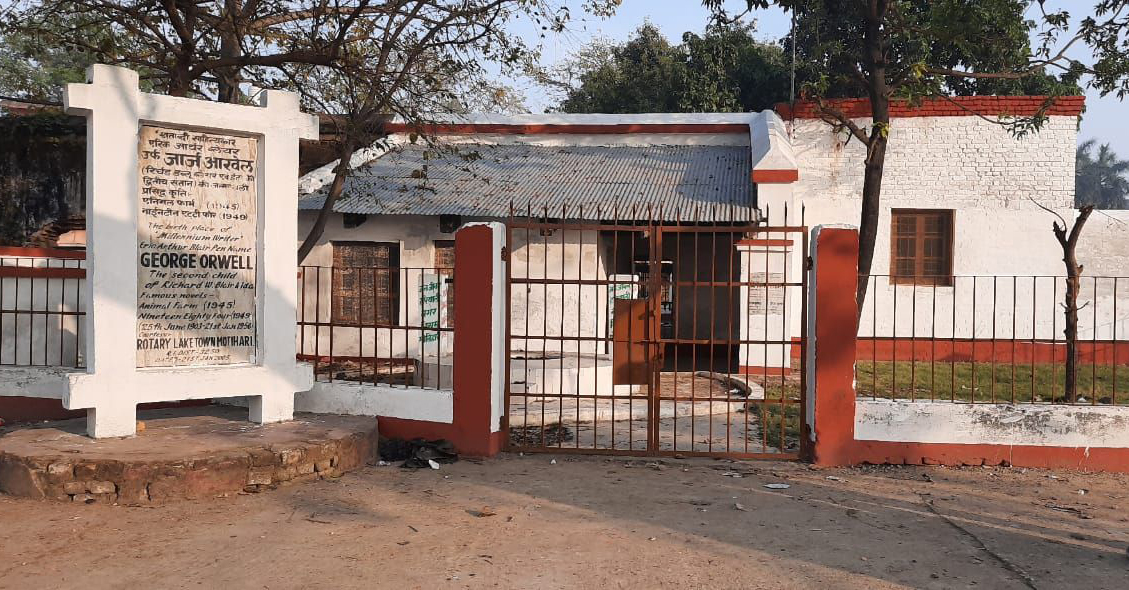
Orwell's birthplace in Motihari, Bihar, India

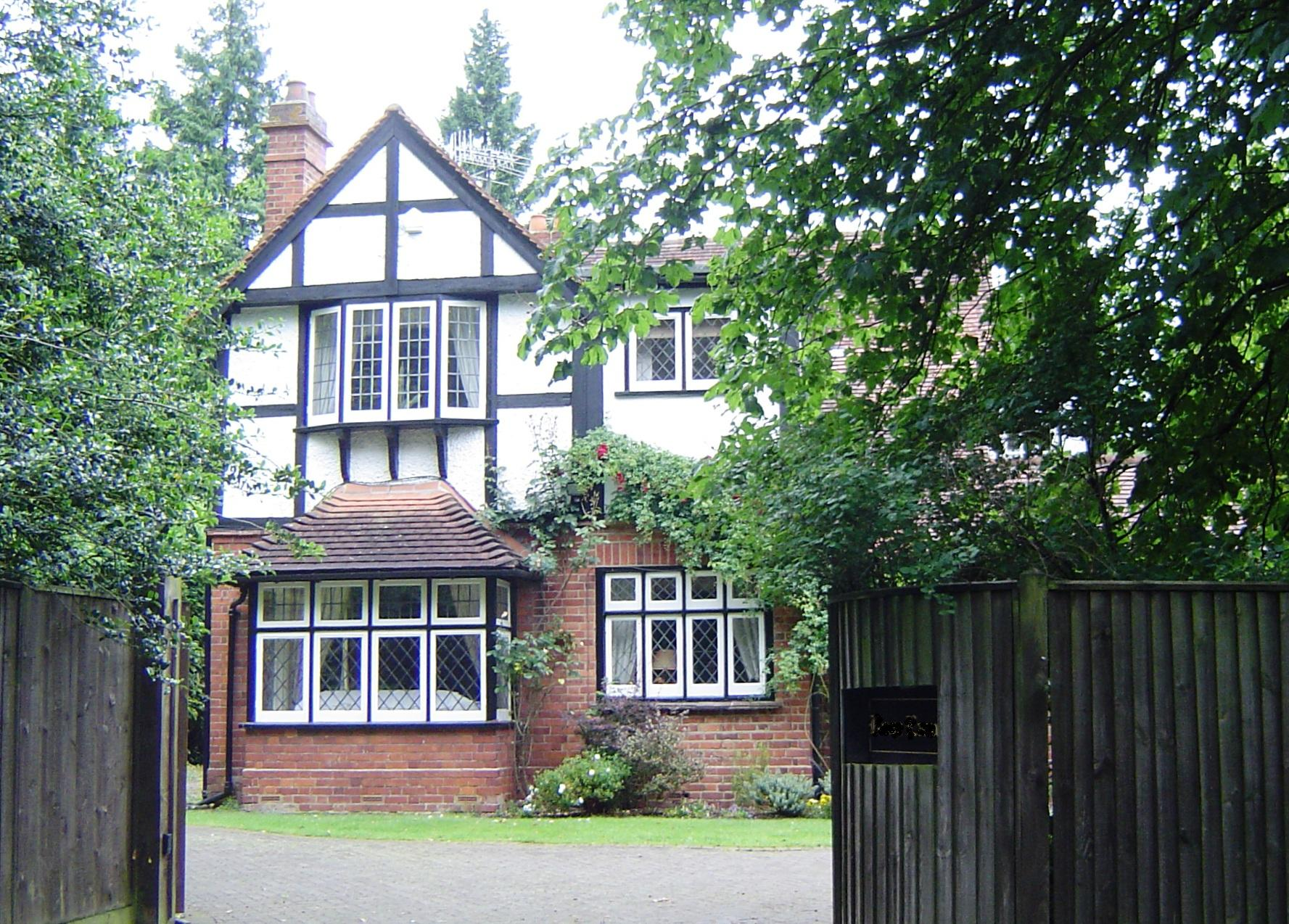
The Blair family home at Shiplake, Oxfordshire

Eric Arthur Blair was born on 25 June 1903 in Motihari, Bengal Presidency (now Bihar), British India, into what he described as a "lower-upper-middle class" family. His paternal great-great-grandfather, Charles Blair, was a wealthy slave-owning country gentleman and an absentee owner of two Jamaican plantations; hailing from Dorset, he married Lady Mary Fane, daughter of Thomas Fane, 8th Earl of Westmorland. His grandfather, Thomas Richard Arthur Blair, was an Anglican clergyman.

Orwell's father was Richard Walmesley Blair, who worked as a sub-deputy opium agent in the Opium Department of the Indian Civil Service, overseeing the production and storage of opium for sale to China. Orwell's mother, Ida Mabel Blair (née Limouzin), grew up in Moulmein, Burma, where her French father, Francis "Frank" Limouzin was involved in speculative ventures. Frank Limouzin's wife, Theresa Catherine Halliley, came from an English family with a tradition of Imperial service in the Subcontinent. Eric had two sisters: Marjorie, five years older; and Avril, five years younger. When Eric was one year old, his mother took him and Marjorie to England. (Note: Stansky and Abrahams suggested that Ida Blair moved to England in 1907, based on information given by her daughter Avril, talking about a time before she was born. This is contrasted by Ida Blair's 1905, as well as a photograph of Eric, aged three, in an English suburban garden. The earlier date coincides with a difficult posting for Blair senior, and the need to start their daughter Marjorie (then six years old) in an English education.) Restoration work for Orwell's Motihari ancestral house began in 2014.

In 1904, Ida settled with her children at Henley-on-Thames in Oxfordshire. Eric was brought up in the company of his mother and sisters and, apart from a brief visit in mid-1907, he did not see his father until 1912. Aged five, Eric was sent as a day student to a convent school in Henley-on-Thames. It was a Catholic convent run by French Ursuline nuns. His mother wanted him to have a public school education, and although his family could not afford it he succeeded in winning a scholarship to Eton. Through the social connections of Ida's brother Charles Limouzin, Blair gained a scholarship to St Cyprian's School in Eastbourne, East Sussex.

Arriving in September 1911, he boarded for the next five years, returning home only for holidays. Although he knew nothing of the reduced fees, he "soon recognised that he was from a poorer home". Blair hated the school and many years later wrote an essay "Such, Such Were the Joys", published posthumously, based on his time there. At St Cyprian's, Blair first met Cyril Connolly, who became a writer and who, as the editor of Horizon, published several of Orwell's essays.

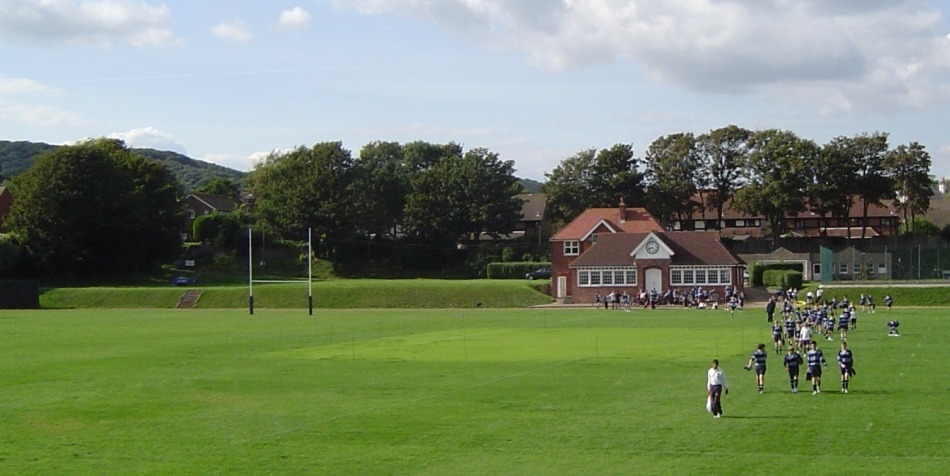
Blair's time at St Cyprian's School inspired his essay "Such, Such Were the Joys".

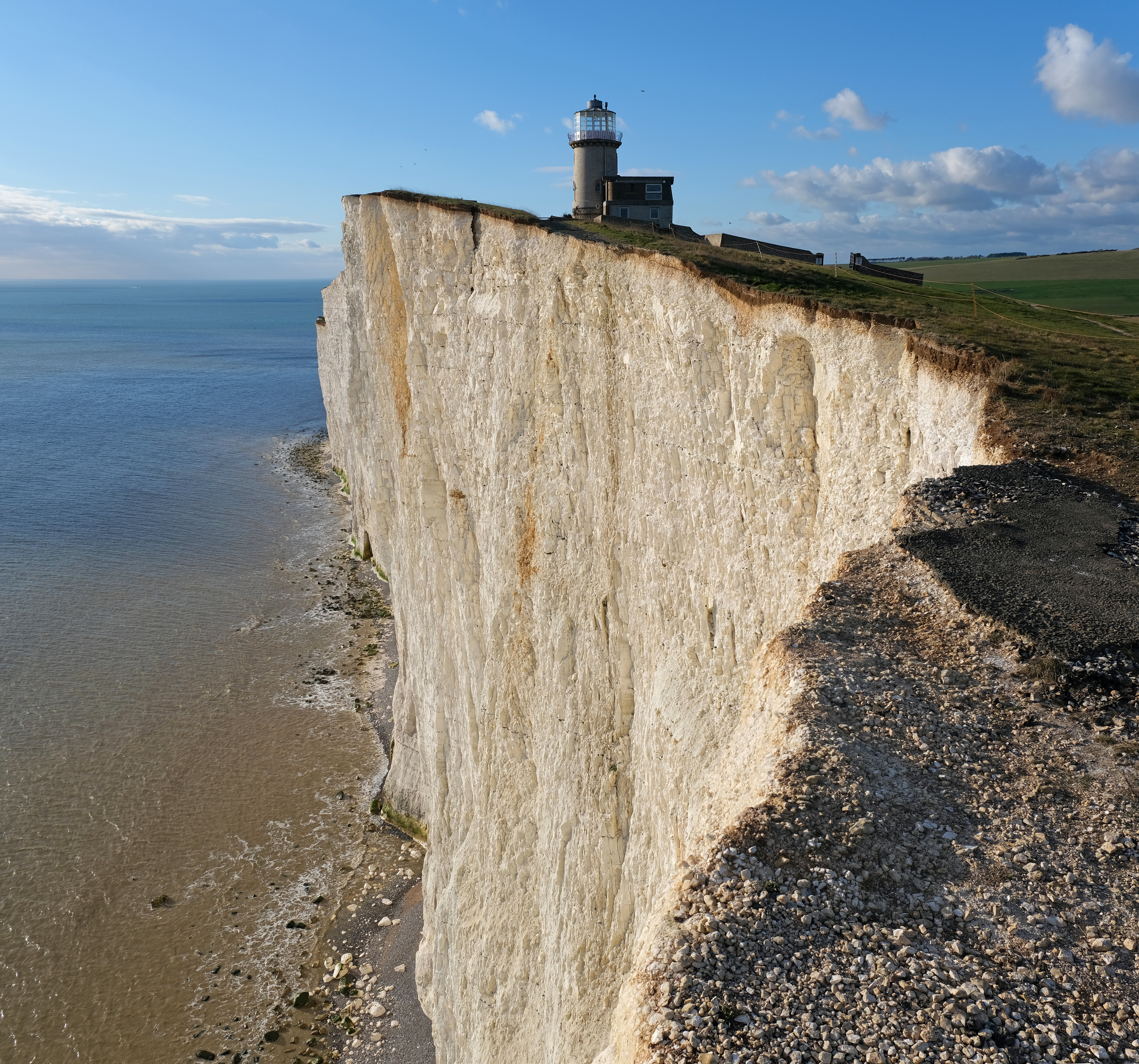
The essay recounts Blair hiking across the South Downs and bathing among the boulders at Beachy Head on the south coast of England.

Before the First World War, the family moved two miles (three kilometres) south to Shiplake, Oxfordshire, where Eric became friendly with the Buddicom family, especially their daughter Jacintha. When they first met, he was standing on his head in a field. Asked why, he said, "You are noticed more if you stand on your head than if you are right way up." Growing up together, Buddicom and Blair became idealistic adolescent sweethearts, reading and writing poetry together, and dreaming of becoming famous writers. Blair also enjoyed shooting, fishing and birdwatching with Jacintha's brother and sister.

While at St Cyprian's, Blair wrote two poems that were published in the Henley and South Oxfordshire Standard. He came second to Connolly in the Harrow History Prize, had his work praised by the school's external examiner, and earned scholarships to Wellington and Eton. But inclusion on the Eton scholarship roll did not guarantee a place, and none were immediately available. He chose to stay at St Cyprian's until December 1916, in case a place at Eton became available.

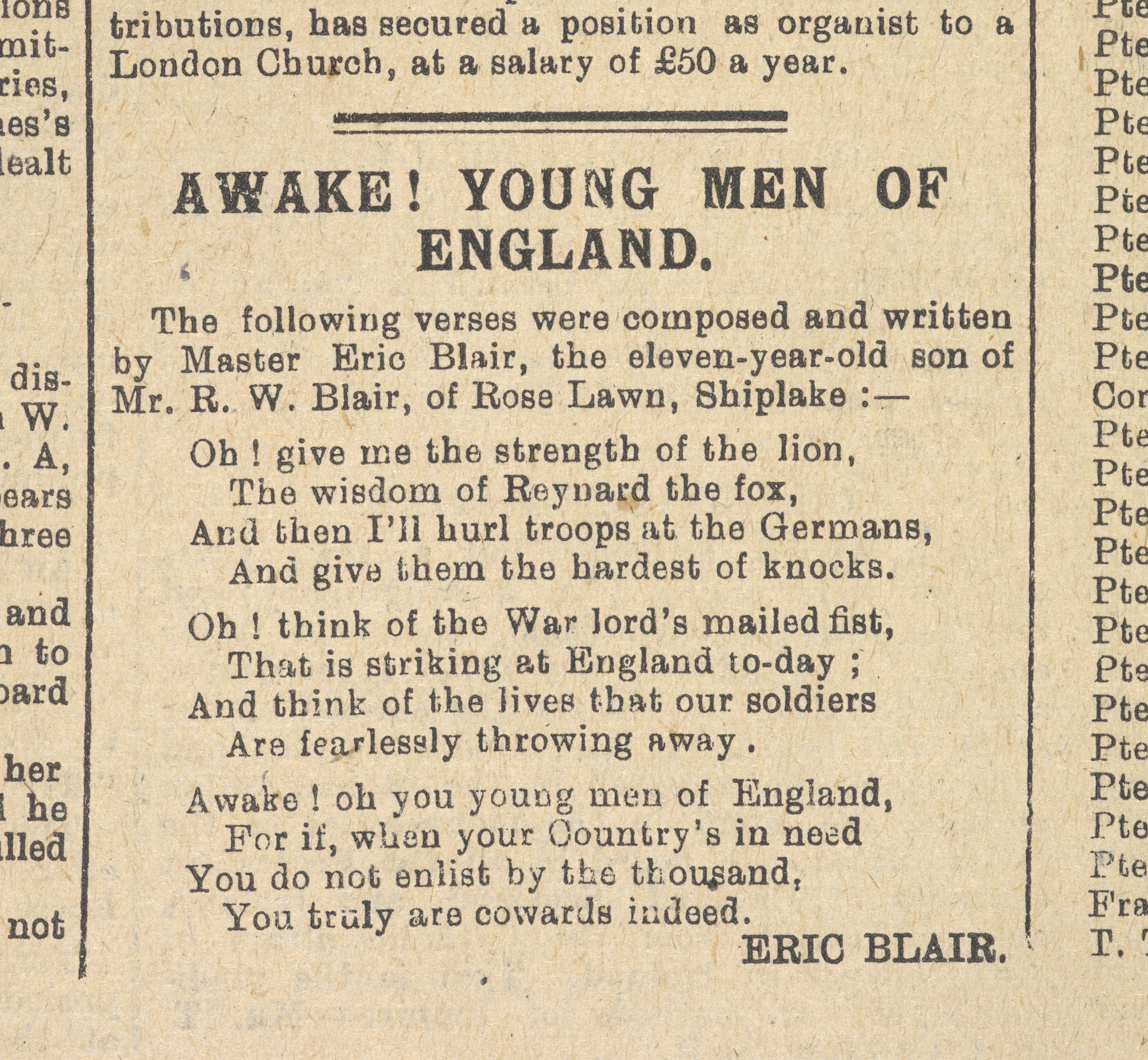
First World War poem by 11-year-old Blair, "Awake! Young Men of England", published in 1914 in the Henley and South Oxfordshire Standard

In January, Blair took up the place at Wellington, where he spent the Spring term. In May 1917 a place became available as a King's Scholar at Eton. At this time the family lived at Mall Chambers, Notting Hill Gate. Blair remained at Eton until December 1921, when he left midway between his 18th and 19th birthdays. Wellington was "beastly", Blair told Jacintha, but he said he was "interested and happy" at Eton. His principal tutor was A. S. F. Gow, Fellow of Trinity College, Cambridge, who gave him advice later in his career. Blair was taught French by Aldous Huxley. Steven Runciman, who was at Eton with Blair, noted that he and his contemporaries appreciated Huxley's linguistic flair.

Blair's performance reports suggest he neglected his studies, but he worked with Roger Mynors to produce a college magazine, The Election Times, joined in the production of other publications—College Days and Bubble and Squeak—and participated in the Eton Wall Game. His parents could not afford to send him to university without another scholarship, and they concluded from his poor results he would not be able to win one. Runciman noted he had a romantic idea about the East, and the family decided Blair should join the Imperial Police, the precursor of the Indian Police Service. For this he had to pass an entrance examination. In December 1921, he left Eton and travelled to join his retired father, mother, and younger sister Avril, who that month had moved to 40 Stradbroke Road, Southwold, Suffolk, the first of their four homes in the town. Blair was enrolled at a crammer there called Craighurst, and brushed up on his Classics, English, and History. He passed the exam, coming seventh out of the 26 who passed.

=== Policing in Burma ===
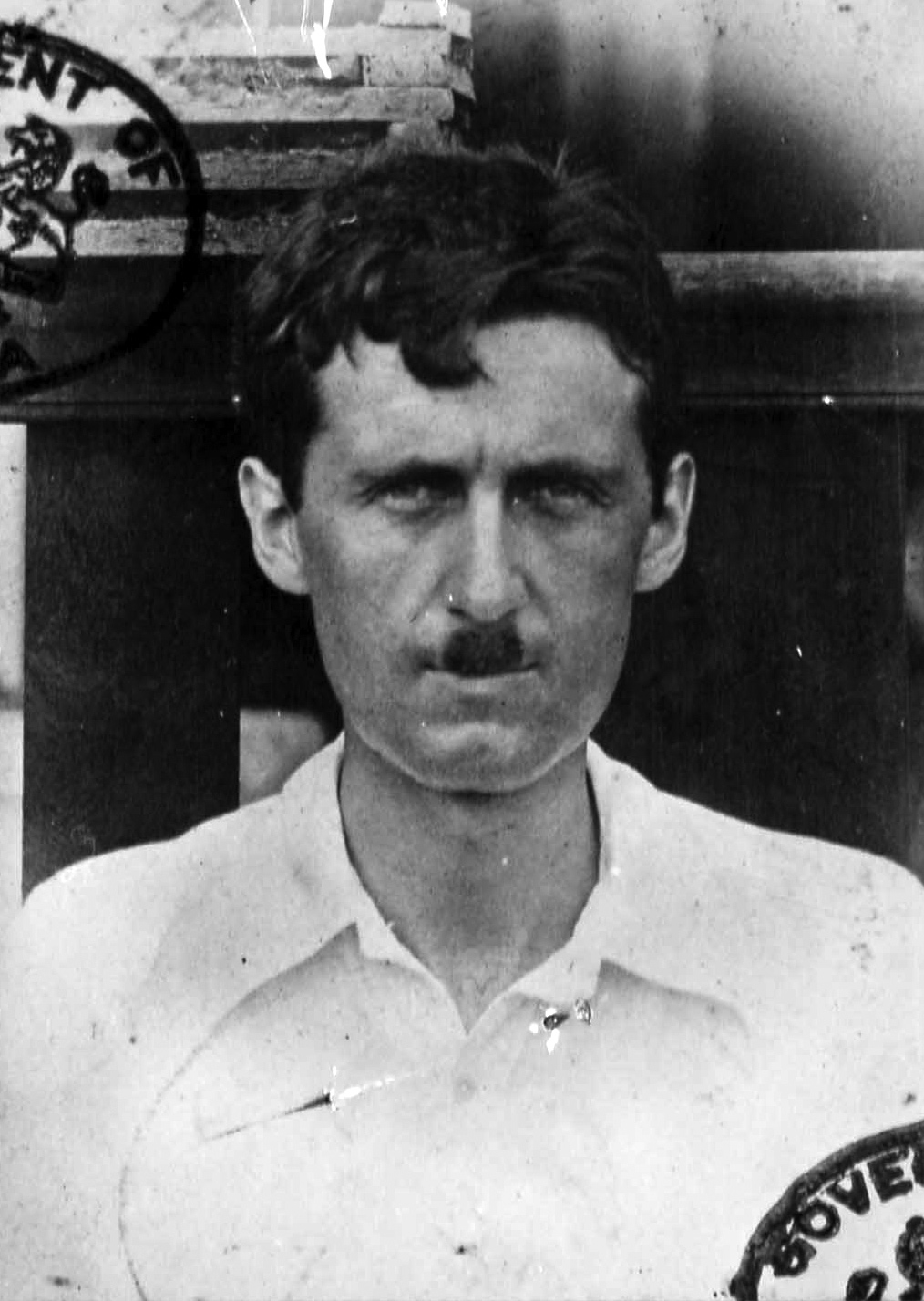
Passport photograph of Blair in Burma. This was the last time he had a toothbrush moustache; he would later acquire a pencil moustache similar to other British officers stationed in Burma.

Blair's maternal grandmother lived at Moulmein, so he chose a posting in Burma, then still a province of British India. In October 1922 he sailed on board SS Herefordshire to join the Indian Imperial Police in Burma. A month later, he arrived at Rangoon and travelled to the police training school in Mandalay. He was appointed an Assistant District Superintendent (on probation) on 29 November 1922, at the pay of Rs. 525 per month. After a short posting at Maymyo, Burma's principal hill station, he was posted to the frontier outpost of Myaungmya in the Irrawaddy Delta at the beginning of 1924.

Working as an imperial police officer gave him considerable responsibility while most of his contemporaries were still at university in England. When he was posted farther east in the Delta to Twante as a sub-divisional police officer, he was responsible for the security of some 200,000 people. At the end of 1924, he was posted to Syriam, closer to Rangoon. Syriam had the refinery of the Burmah Oil Company, "the surrounding land a barren waste, all vegetation killed off by the fumes of sulphur dioxide pouring out day and night from the stacks of the refinery". But the town was near Rangoon, a cosmopolitan seaport, and Blair went into the city as often as he could, "to browse in a bookshop; to eat well-cooked food; to get away from the boring routine of police life". In September 1925 he went to Insein, the home of Insein Prison. By this time, Blair had completed his training and was receiving a monthly salary of Rs. 740, including allowances.

Blair recalled he faced hostility from the Burmese, "in the end the sneering yellow faces of young men that met me everywhere, the insults hooted after me when I was at a safe distance, got badly on my nerves". He recalled that "I was stuck between my hatred of the empire I served and my rage against the evil-spirited little beasts who tried to make my job impossible".

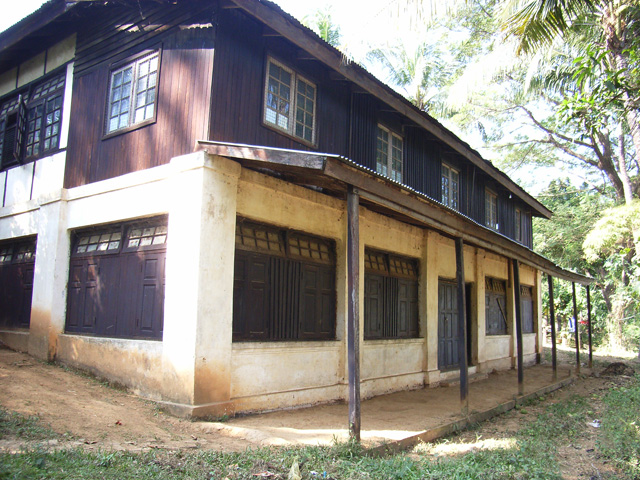
British Club in Katha, Myanmar

In Burma, Blair acquired a reputation as an outsider. He spent much of his time alone, reading or pursuing non-pukka activities, such as attending the churches of the Karen ethnic group. A colleague, Roger Beadon, recalled that Blair was fast to learn the language and that before he left Burma, "was able to speak fluently with Burmese priests in 'very high-flown Burmese'". Blair made changes to his appearance in Burma that remained for the rest of his life, including adopting a pencil moustache. Emma Larkin writes in the introduction to Burmese Days:

While in Burma, he acquired a moustache similar to those worn by officers of the British regiments stationed there. [He] also acquired some tattoos; on each knuckle he had a small untidy blue circle. Many Burmese living in rural areas still sport tattoos like this—they are believed to protect against bullets and snake bites.

In April 1926, he moved to Moulmein, where his maternal grandmother lived. At the end of that year, he was assigned to Katha in Upper Burma, where he contracted dengue fever in 1927. Entitled to a leave in England that year, he was allowed to return in July due to his illness. While on holiday with his family in Cornwall in September 1927, he reappraised his life. Deciding against returning to Burma, he resigned from the Indian Imperial Police to become a writer, with effect from 12 March 1928. He drew on his experiences in the Burma police for the novel Burmese Days (1934) and the essays "A Hanging" (1931) and "Shooting an Elephant" (1936).

=== London and Paris ===
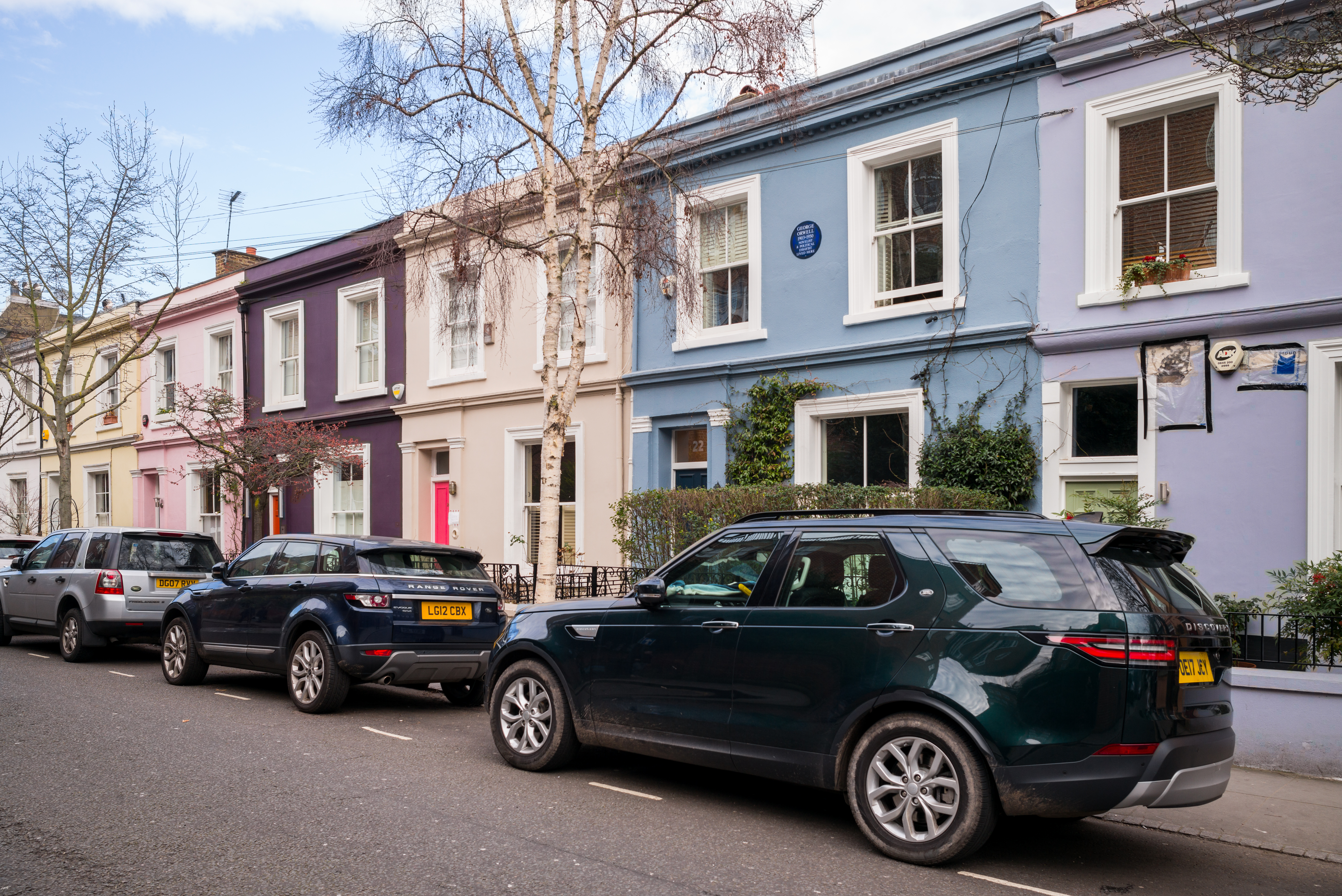
The blue house on the right was Blair's 1927 lodgings in Portobello Road, London.

In England, he settled back in the family home at Southwold, renewing acquaintance with local friends and attending an Old Etonian dinner. He visited his old tutor Gow at Cambridge for advice on becoming a writer. In 1927, he moved to London. Ruth Pitter, a family acquaintance, helped him find lodgings, and by the end of 1927 he had moved into rooms in Portobello Road; a blue plaque commemorates his residence there. Pitter's involvement in the move "would have lent it a reassuring respectability in Mrs. Blair's eyes". Pitter had a sympathetic interest in Blair's writing, pointed out weaknesses in his poetry, and advised him to write about what he knew. In fact he decided to write of "certain aspects of the present that he set out to know" and ventured into the East End of London—the first of the occasional sorties he would make intermittently over a period of five years to discover the world of poverty and the down-and-outers who inhabit it.

In imitation of Jack London, whose writing he admired (particularly The People of the Abyss), Blair started to explore the poorer parts of London. On his first outing he set out to Limehouse Causeway, spending his first night in a common lodging house, possibly George Levy's "kip". For a while he "went native" in his own country, dressing like a tramp, adopting the name P.S. Burton; he recorded his experiences of the low life for use in "The Spike", his first published essay in English, and in the second half of his first book, Down and Out in Paris and London (1933).

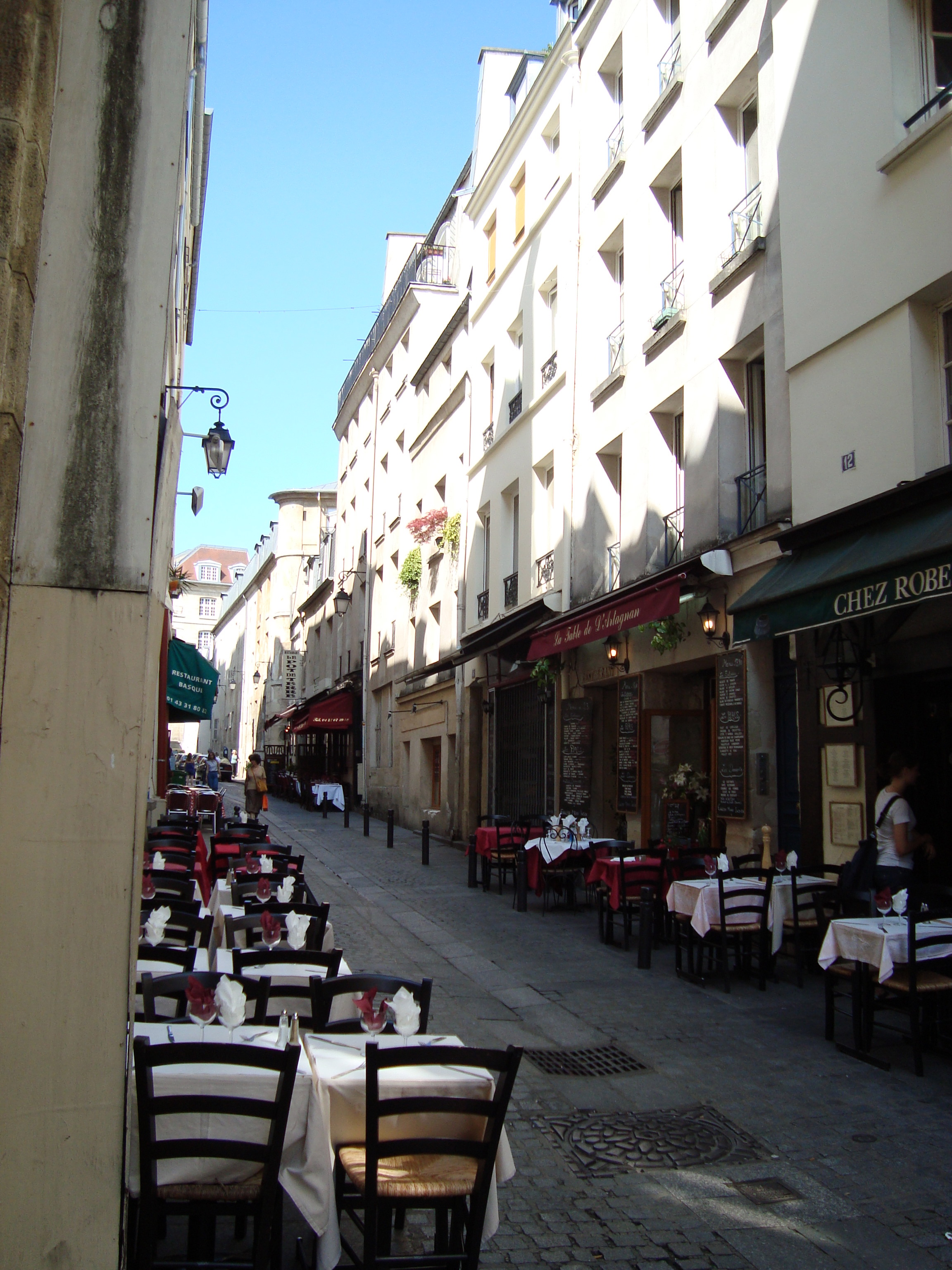
Rue du Pot-de-Fer on the Left Bank in the 5th arrondissement, where Blair lived in Paris

In early 1928 he moved to Paris. He lived in the rue du Pot de Fer, a working class district in the 5th arrondissement. His aunt Ellen (Nellie) Kate Limouzin also lived in Paris (with the Esperantist Eugène Lanti) and gave him social and, when necessary, financial support. He began to write novels, including an early version of Burmese Days, but nothing else survives from that period. He was more successful as a journalist and published articles in Monde, a political/literary journal edited by Henri Barbusse (his first article as a professional writer, "La Censure en Angleterre", appeared in that journal on 6 October 1928); G. K.'s Weekly, where his first article to appear in England, "A Farthing Newspaper", was printed on 29 December 1928; and Le Progrès Civique (founded by the left-wing coalition Le Cartel des Gauches). Three pieces appeared in successive weeks in Le Progrès Civique: discussing unemployment, a day in the life of a tramp, and the beggars of London, respectively. "In one or another of its destructive forms, poverty was to become his obsessive subject—at the heart of almost everything he wrote until Homage to Catalonia."

He fell seriously ill in February 1929 and was taken to the Hôpital Cochin, a free hospital where medical students were trained. His experiences there were the basis of his essay "How the Poor Die", published in 1946 (though he chose not to identify the hospital). Shortly afterwards, he had all his money stolen from his lodging house. Whether through necessity or to collect material, he undertook menial jobs such as dishwashing in a fashionable hotel on the rue de Rivoli, which he later described in Down and Out in Paris and London. In August 1929, he sent a copy of "The Spike" to John Middleton Murry's New Adelphi magazine in London. The magazine was edited by Max Plowman and Sir Richard Rees, and Plowman accepted the work for publication.

=== Southwold ===
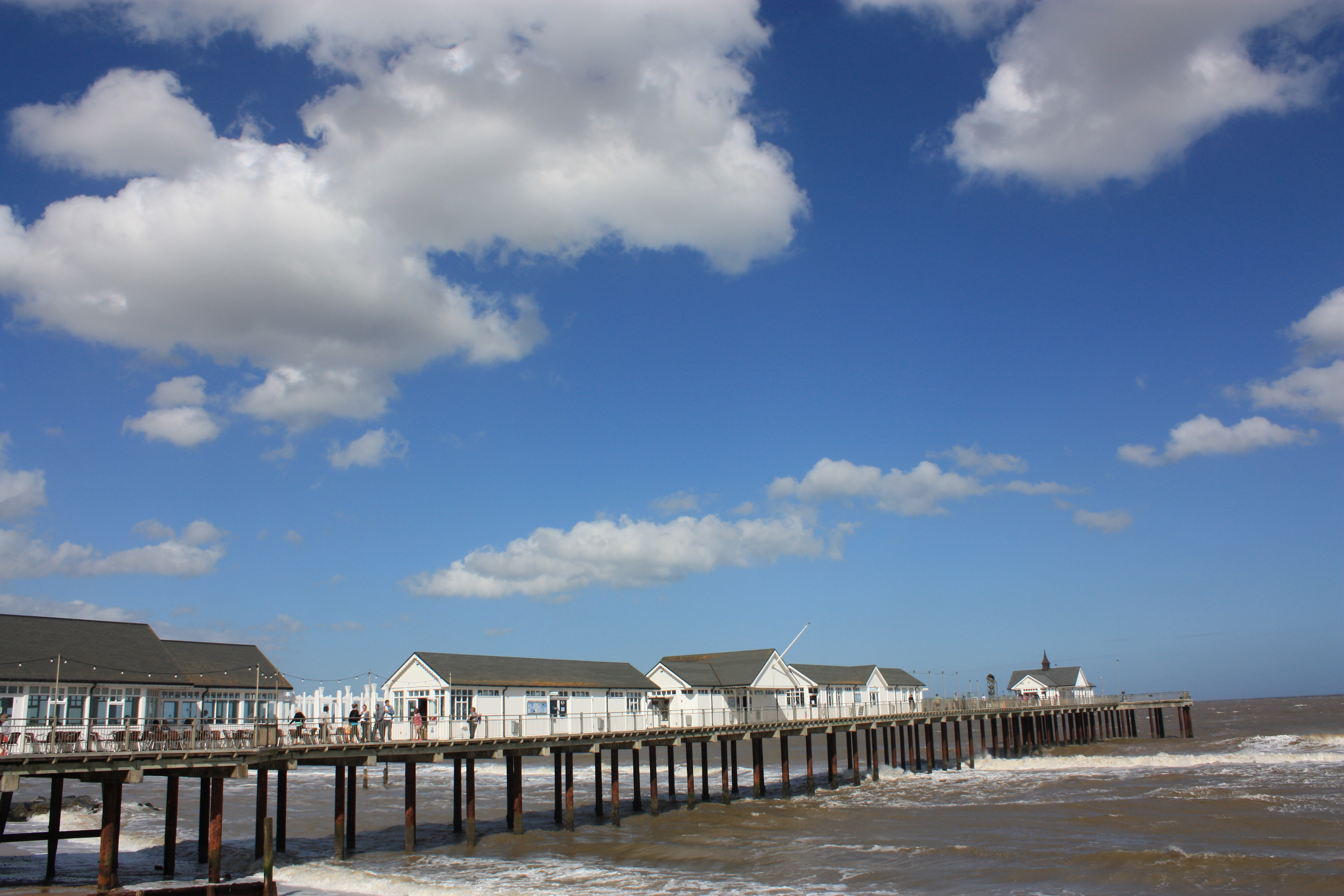
Southwold Pier in Southwold. Orwell wrote A Clergyman's Daughter (1935) in the town, basing the fictional town of Knype Hill partly on Southwold.

In December 1929, after nearly two years in Paris, Blair returned to England and went directly to his parents' house in Southwold, a coastal town in Suffolk, which remained his base for the next five years. The family was well established in the town, where his sister Avril ran a tea-house. He became acquainted with many local people, including Brenda Salkeld, the clergyman's daughter who worked as a gym-teacher at St Felix Girls' School. Although Salkeld rejected his offer of marriage, she remained a friend and regular correspondent for many years. He also renewed friendships with older friends, such as Dennis Collings, whose girlfriend Eleanor Jacques was also to play a part in his life.

In early 1930 he stayed briefly in Bramley, Leeds, with his sister Marjorie and her husband Humphrey Dakin. Blair was writing reviews for Adelphi and acting as a private tutor to a disabled child at Southwold. He then served as a private tutor to three brothers, including the future distinguished academic Richard Peters.

His history in these years is marked by dualities and contrasts. There is Blair leading a respectable, outwardly eventless life at his parents' house in Southwold, writing; then in contrast, there is Blair as Burton (the name he used in his down-and-out episodes) in search of experience in the kips and spikes, in the East End, on the road, and in the hop fields of Kent.

He went painting and bathing on the beach, and there he met Mabel and Francis Fierz, who later influenced his career. Over the next year he visited them in London, often meeting their friend Max Plowman. He also often stayed at the homes of Ruth Pitter and Richard Rees, where he could "change" for his sporadic tramping expeditions. One of his jobs was domestic work at a lodgings for half a crown (two shillings and sixpence, or one-eighth of a pound) a day.

Blair now contributed regularly to Adelphi, with "A Hanging" appearing in August 1931. From August to September 1931 his explorations of poverty continued, and, like the protagonist of A Clergyman's Daughter, he followed the East End tradition of working in the Kent hop fields. He kept a diary about his experiences there. Afterwards, he lodged in the Tooley Street kip, but could not stand it for long, and with financial help from his parents moved to Windsor Street, where he stayed until Christmas. "Hop Picking", by Eric Blair, appeared in the October 1931 issue of New Statesman, whose editorial staff included his old friend Cyril Connolly. Mabel Fierz put him in contact with Leonard Moore, who became his literary agent in April 1932.

At this time Jonathan Cape rejected A Scullion's Diary, the first version of Down and Out. On the advice of Richard Rees, he offered it to Faber & Faber, but their editorial director, T. S. Eliot, also rejected it. Blair ended the year by deliberately getting himself arrested, so that he could experience Christmas in prison, but after he was picked up and taken to Bethnal Green police station in the East End of London the authorities did not regard his "drunk and disorderly" behaviour as imprisonable, and after two days in a cell he returned home to Southwold.

=== Teaching career ===
In April 1932 Blair became a teacher at The Hawthorns High School, a school for boys, in Hayes, west London. This was a small private school, and had only 14 or 16 boys aged between ten and sixteen, and one other master. While at the school he became friendly with the curate of the local parish church and became involved with activities there. Mabel Fierz had pursued matters with Moore, and at the end of June 1932, Moore told Blair that Victor Gollancz was prepared to publish A Scullion's Diary for a £40 advance, through his recently founded publishing house, Victor Gollancz Ltd, which was an outlet for radical and socialist works.

At the end of the summer term in 1932, Blair returned to Southwold, where his parents had used a legacy to buy their own home. Blair and his sister Avril spent the holidays making the house habitable while he also worked on Burmese Days. He was also spending time with Eleanor Jacques, but her attachment to Dennis Collings remained an obstacle to his hopes of a more serious relationship.

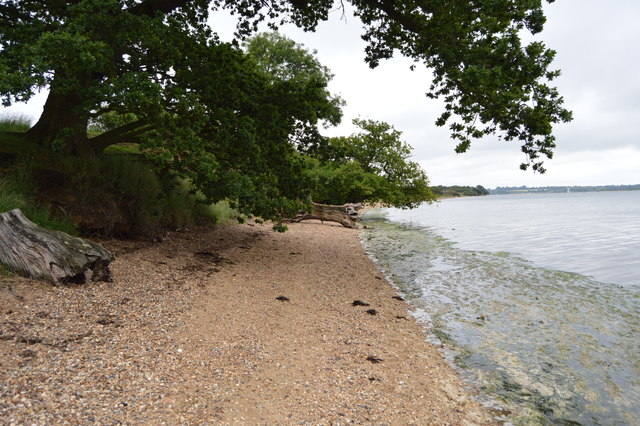
The pen name George Orwell was inspired by the River Orwell in the English county of Suffolk.

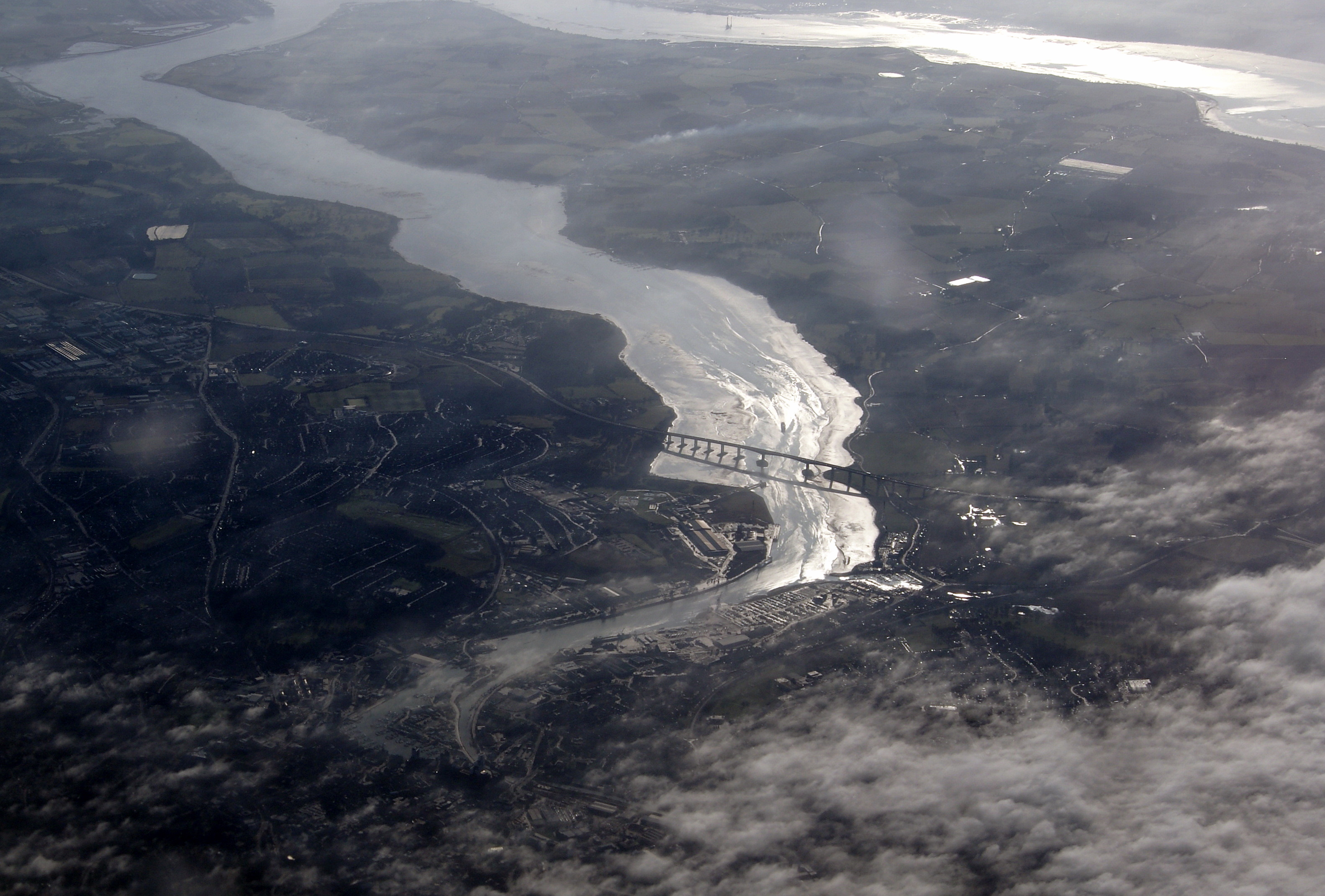
Aerial view of the River Orwell

"Clink", an essay describing his failed attempt to get sent to prison, appeared in the August 1932 number of Adelphi. He returned to teaching at Hayes and prepared for the publication of his book, now known as Down and Out in Paris and London. He wished to publish under a different name to avoid any embarrassment to his family over his time as a "tramp". In a letter to Moore (dated 15 November 1932), he left the choice of pseudonym to Moore and to Gollancz. Four days later, he wrote to Moore, suggesting the pseudonyms P.S. Burton (a name he used when tramping), Kenneth Miles, George Orwell, and H. Lewis Allways. He finally adopted the pen name George Orwell because "It is a good round English name." The name George was inspired by the patron saint of England, and Orwell after the River Orwell in Suffolk which was one of Orwell's favourite locations.

Down and Out in Paris and London was published by Victor Gollancz in London on 9 January 1933 and received favourable reviews, with Cecil Day-Lewis complimenting Orwell's "clarity and good sense", and The Times Literary Supplement comparing Orwell's eccentric characters to the characters of Dickens. Down and Out was modestly successful and was next published by Harper & Brothers in New York.

In mid-1933 Blair left Hawthorns to become a teacher at Frays College, in Uxbridge, west London. This was a much larger establishment with 200 pupils and a full complement of staff. He acquired a motorcycle and took trips through the surrounding countryside. On one of these expeditions he became soaked and caught a chill that developed into pneumonia. He was taken to a cottage hospital in Uxbridge, where for a time his life was believed to be in danger. When he was discharged in January 1934, he returned to Southwold to convalesce and, supported by his parents, never returned to teaching.

He was disappointed when Gollancz turned down Burmese Days, mainly on the grounds of potential suits for libel, but Harper were prepared to publish it in the United States. Meanwhile, Blair started work on the novel A Clergyman's Daughter, drawing upon his life as a teacher and on life in Southwold. Eventually in October, after sending A Clergyman's Daughter to Moore, he left for London to take a job that had been found for him by his aunt Nellie Limouzin.

=== Hampstead ===
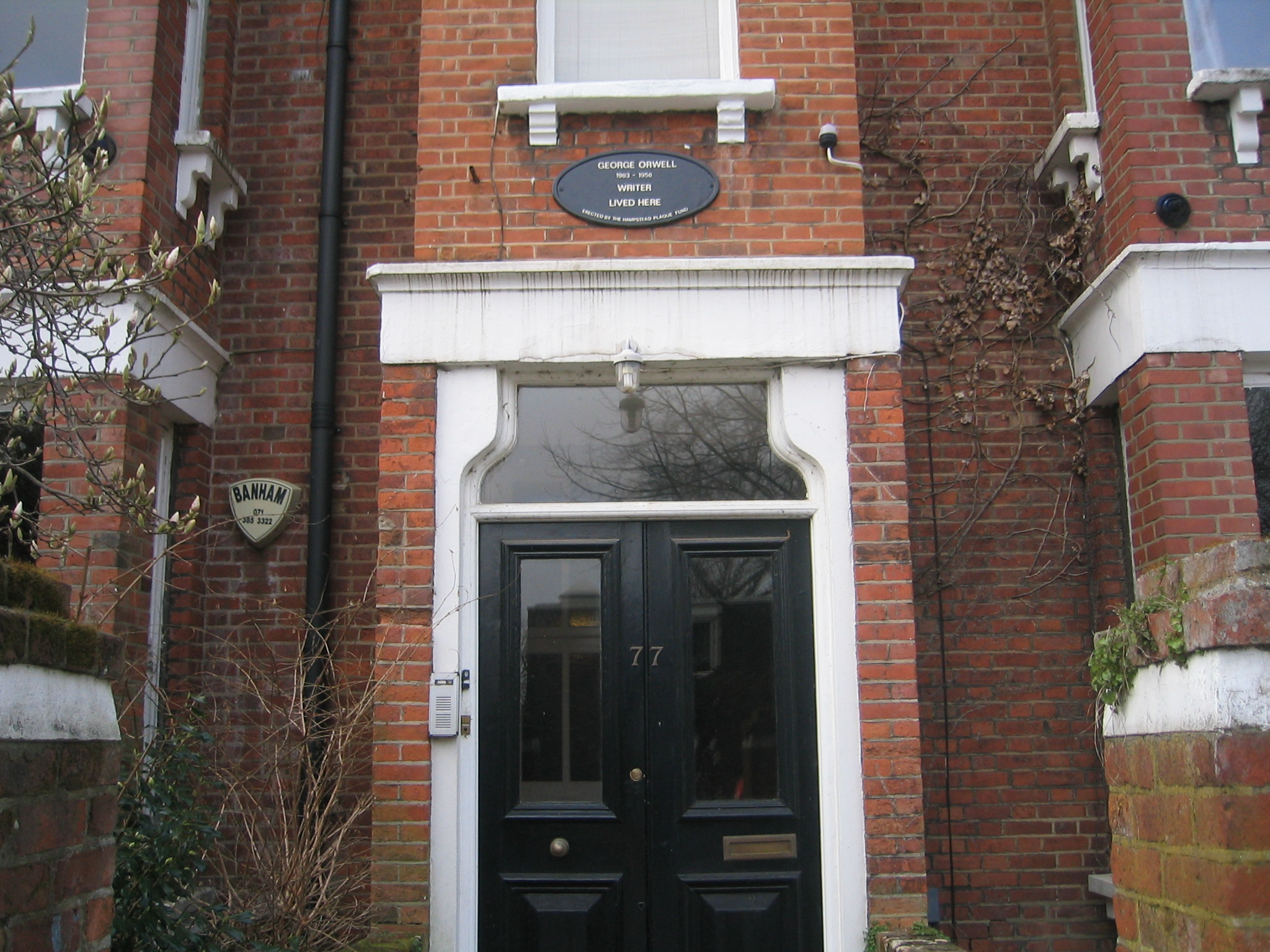
Orwell's former home at 77 Parliament Hill, Hampstead, London

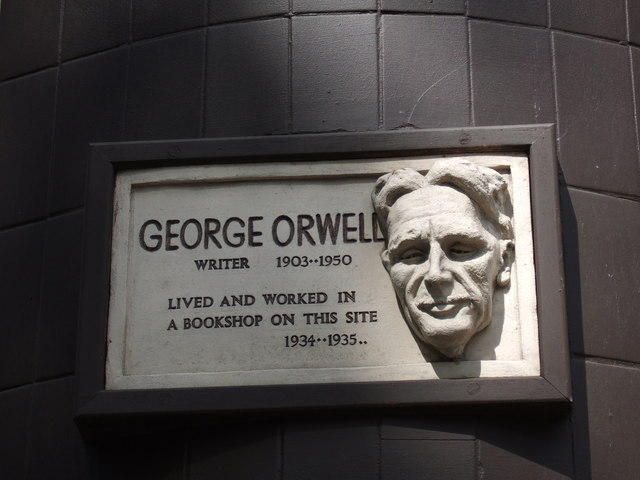
His time as a bookseller is marked with this plaque in Pond Street, Hampstead.

This job was as a part-time assistant in Booklovers' Corner, a second-hand bookshop in Hampstead run by Francis and Myfanwy Westrope, who were friends of Nellie Limouzin in the Esperanto movement. The Westropes were friendly and provided him with comfortable accommodation at Warwick Mansions, Pond Street. He was sharing the job with Jon Kimche, who also lived with the Westropes. Blair worked at the shop in the afternoons and had his mornings free to write and his evenings free to socialise. These experiences provided background for the novel Keep the Aspidistra Flying (1936). As well as the various guests of the Westropes, he was able to enjoy the company of Richard Rees and the Adelphi writers and Mabel Fierz. The Westropes and Kimche were members of the Independent Labour Party, although at this time Blair was not seriously politically active. He was writing for the Adelphi and preparing A Clergyman's Daughter and Burmese Days for publication.

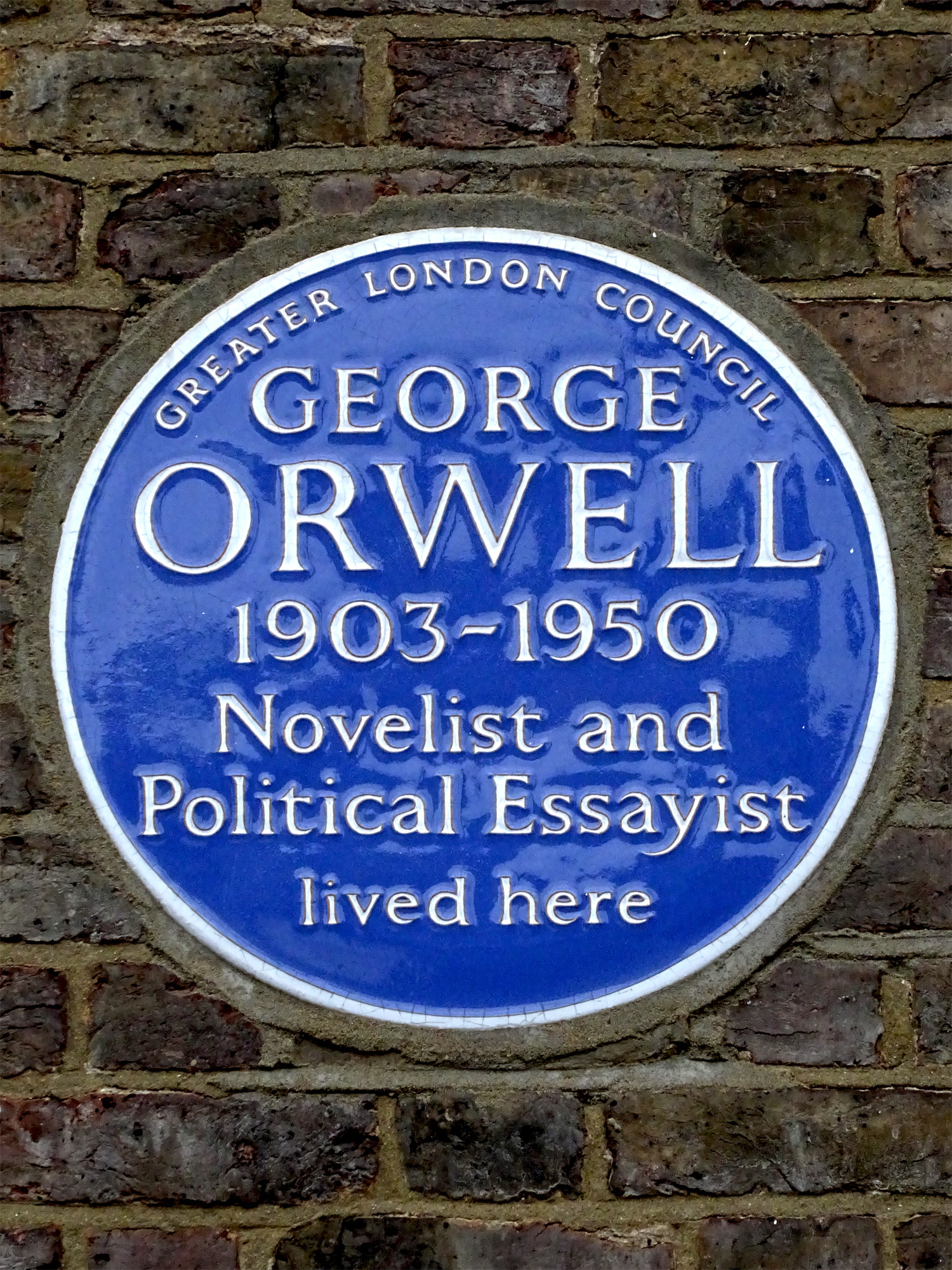
English Heritage blue plaque in Kentish Town, London, where Orwell lived from August 1935 until January 1936

At the beginning of 1935 he had to move out of Warwick Mansions, and Mabel Fierz found him a flat in Parliament Hill. A Clergyman's Daughter was published on 11 March 1935. In early 1935 Blair met his future wife Eileen O'Shaughnessy, when his landlady, Rosalind Obermeyer, who was studying for a master's degree in psychology at University College London, invited some of her fellow students to a party. One of these students, Elizaveta Fen, recalled Blair and his friend Richard Rees "draped" at the fireplace, looking, she thought, "moth-eaten and prematurely aged". Around this time, Blair had started to write reviews for The New English Weekly.

In June, Burmese Days was published and Cyril Connolly's positive review in the New Statesman prompted Blair to re-establish contact with his old friend. In August, he moved into a flat, at 50 Lawford Road, Kentish Town, which he shared with Michael Sayers and Rayner Heppenstall. The relationship was sometimes awkward and Blair and Heppenstall even came to blows, though they remained friends and later worked together on BBC broadcasts. Blair was now working on Keep the Aspidistra Flying, and also tried unsuccessfully to write a serial for the News Chronicle. By October 1935 his flatmates had moved out and he was struggling to pay the rent on his own. He remained until the end of January 1936, when he stopped working at Booklovers' Corner. In 1980, English Heritage honoured Orwell with a blue plaque at his Kentish Town residence.

=== The Road to Wigan Pier ===
At this time, Victor Gollancz suggested Orwell spend a short time investigating social conditions in economically depressed Northern England. (Note: The conventional view, based on Geoffrey Gorer's recollections, is of a specific commission with a £500 advance. Taylor argues that Orwell's subsequent life does not suggest he received such a large advance, Gollancz was not known to pay large sums to relatively unknown authors, and Gollancz took little proprietorial interest in progress.) The Depression had introduced a number of working-class writers from the North of England to the reading public. It was one of these working-class authors, Jack Hilton, whom Orwell sought for advice. Orwell had written to Hilton seeking lodging and asking for recommendations on his route. Hilton was unable to provide him lodging, but suggested that he travel to Wigan rather than Rochdale, "for there are the colliers and they're good stuff".

On 31 January 1936, Orwell set out by public transport and on foot. Arriving in Manchester after the banks had closed, he had to stay in a common lodging-house. The next day he picked up a list of contacts sent by Richard Rees. One of these, the trade union official Frank Meade, suggested Wigan, where Orwell spent February staying in dirty lodgings over a tripe shop. In Wigan, he visited many homes to see how people lived, went down Bryn Hall coal mine, and used the local public library to consult public health records and reports on working conditions in mines.

During this time, he was distracted by concerns about style and possible libel in Keep the Aspidistra Flying. He made a quick visit to Liverpool and during March, stayed in south Yorkshire, spending time in Sheffield and Barnsley. As well as visiting mines, including Grimethorpe, and observing social conditions, he attended meetings of the Communist Party and of Oswald Mosley ("his speech the usual claptrap—The blame for everything was put upon mysterious international gangs of Jews") where he saw the tactics of the Blackshirts. He also made visits to his sister at Headingley, during which he visited the Brontë Parsonage at Haworth.

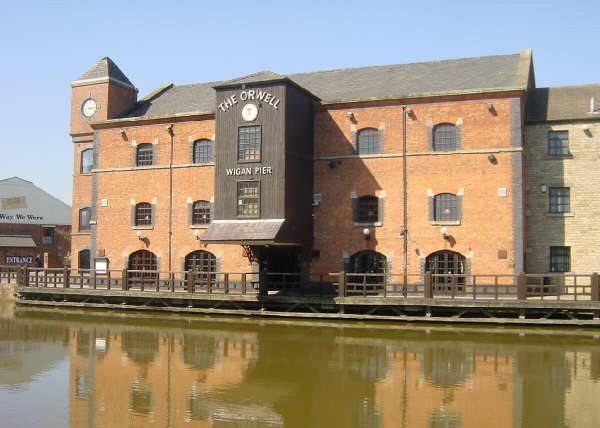
A former warehouse at Wigan Pier is named after Orwell.

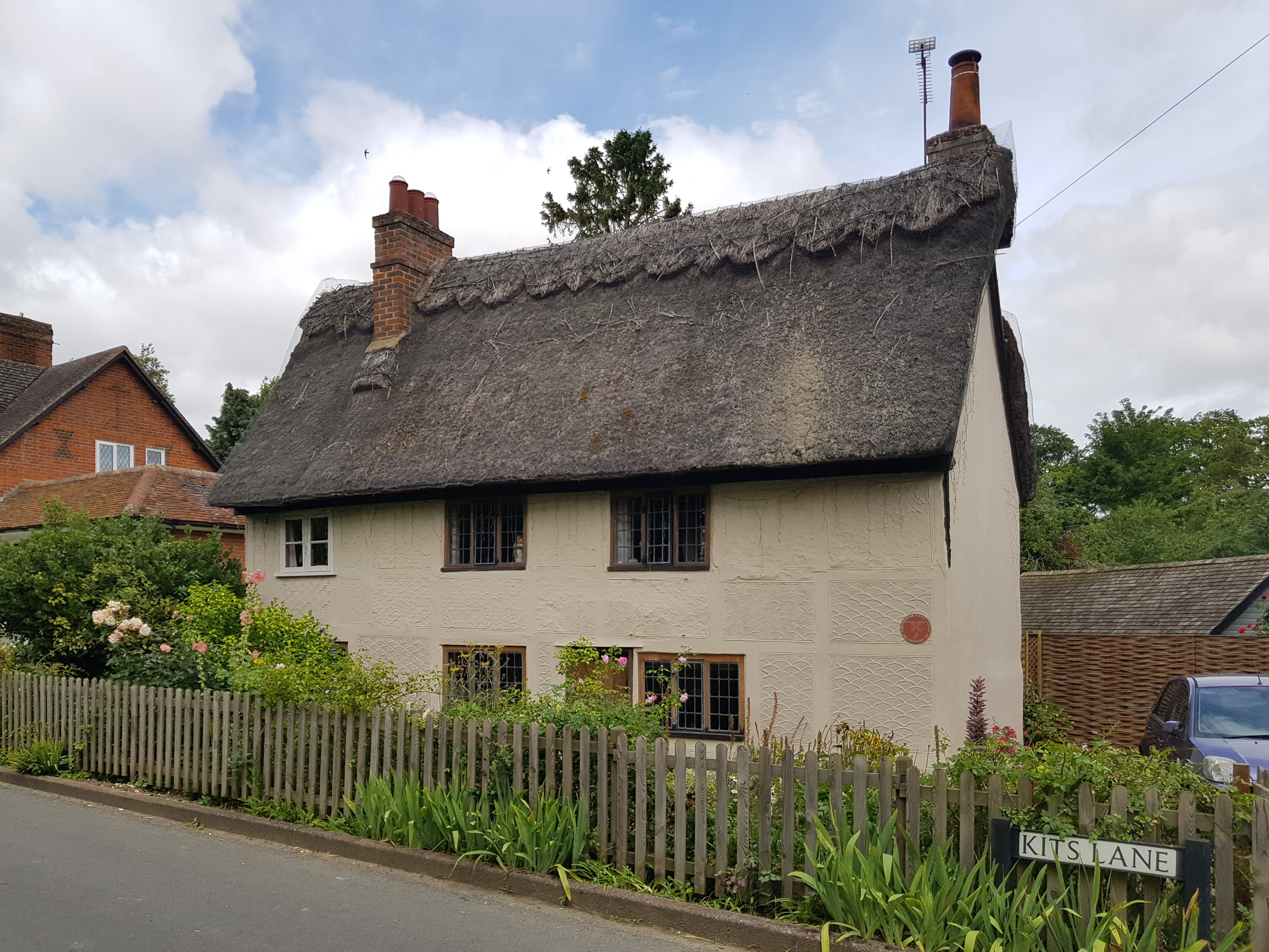
No 2 Kits Lane, Wallington, Hertfordshire, Orwell's residence c. 1936–1940

Orwell needed somewhere he could concentrate on writing his book, and once again help was provided by Aunt Nellie, who was living at Wallington, Hertfordshire, in a very small 16th-century cottage called the "Stores". Orwell took over the tenancy and moved in on 2 April 1936. He started work on The Road to Wigan Pier by the end of April, but also spent hours working on the garden, planting a rose garden which is still extant, and revealing four years later that "outside my work the thing I care most about is gardening, especially vegetable gardening". He also tested the possibility of reopening the Stores as a village shop. Keep the Aspidistra Flying was published by Gollancz on 20 April 1936. On 4 August, Orwell gave a talk at the Adelphi Summer School held at Langham, entitled An Outsider Sees the Distressed Areas; others who spoke at the school included John Strachey, Max Plowman, Karl Polanyi and Reinhold Niebuhr.

The result of his journeys through the north was The Road to Wigan Pier, published by Gollancz for the Left Book Club in 1937. The first half of the book documents his social investigations of Lancashire and Yorkshire, including an evocative description of working life in the coal mines. The second half is a long essay on his upbringing and the development of his political conscience, which includes an argument for socialism. Gollancz feared the second half would offend readers and added a disculpatory preface to the book while Orwell was in Spain. Orwell's research for The Road to Wigan Pier led to him being placed under surveillance by the Special Branch from 1936.

Orwell married O'Shaughnessy on 9 June 1936. Shortly afterwards, the political crisis began in Spain and Orwell followed developments there closely. At the end of the year, concerned by Francisco Franco's military uprising, Orwell decided to go to Spain to take part in the Spanish Civil War on the Republican side. Under the erroneous impression that he needed papers from some left-wing organisation to cross the frontier, on John Strachey's recommendation he applied unsuccessfully to Harry Pollitt, leader of the British Communist Party. Pollitt was suspicious of Orwell's political reliability; he asked him whether he would undertake to join the International Brigades and advised him to get a safe-conduct from the Spanish Embassy in Paris. Not wishing to commit himself until he had seen the situation in situ, Orwell instead used his Independent Labour Party contacts to get a letter of introduction to John McNair in Barcelona.

=== Spanish Civil War ===
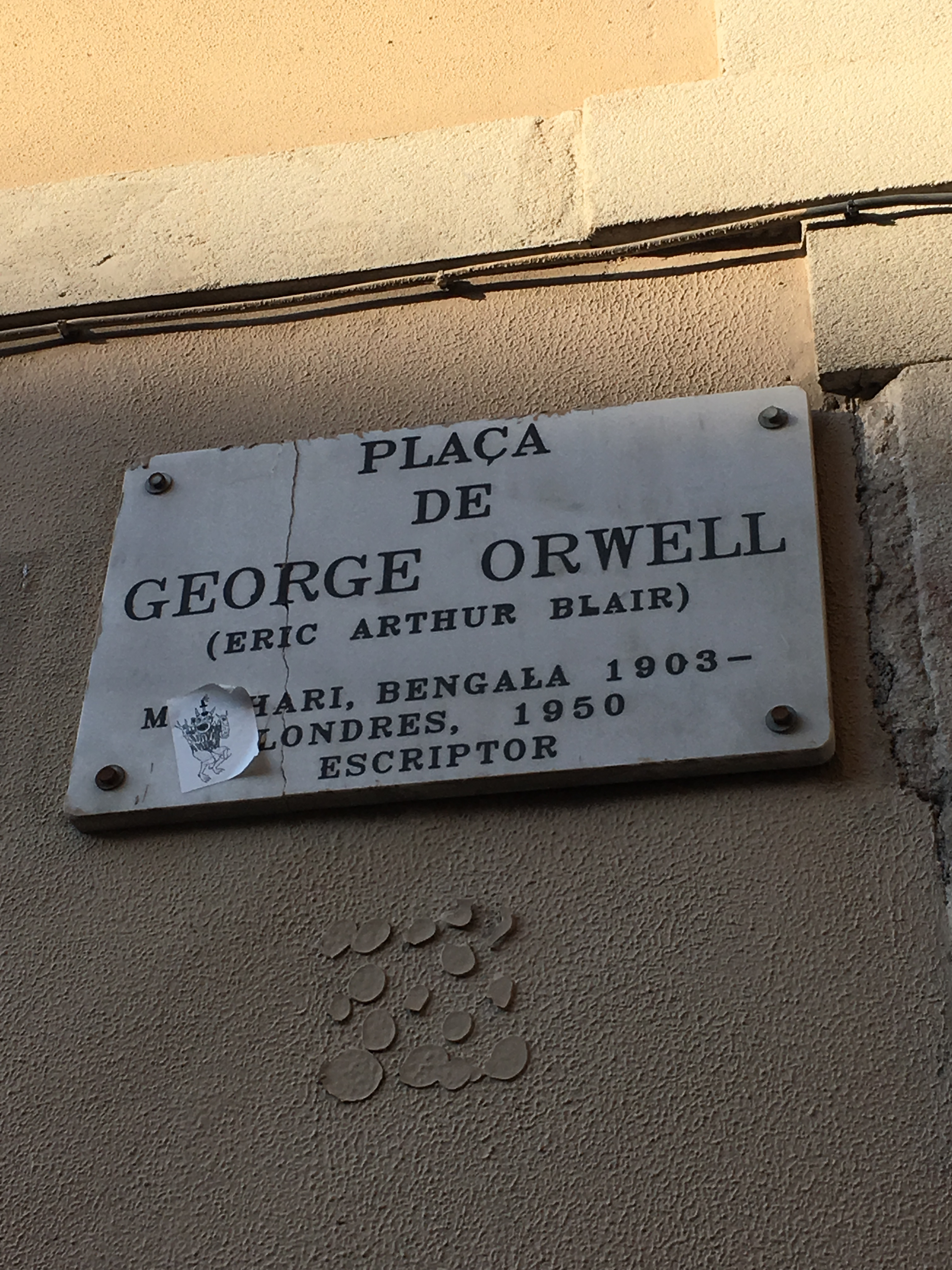
The square in Barcelona renamed in Orwell's honour

Orwell set out for Spain on about 23 December 1936, dining with Henry Miller in Paris on the way. Miller told Orwell that going to fight in the Civil War out of some sense of obligation or guilt was "sheer stupidity" and that the Englishman's ideas "about combating Fascism, defending democracy, etc., etc., were all baloney". A few days later in Barcelona, Orwell met John McNair of the Independent Labour Party (ILP) Office. The Republican government was supported by a number of factions with conflicting aims, including the Workers' Party of Marxist Unification (POUM), the anarcho-syndicalist Confederación Nacional del Trabajo (CNT) and the Unified Socialist Party of Catalonia (a wing of the Spanish Communist Party). Orwell was at first exasperated by this "kaleidoscope" of political parties and trade unions. The ILP was linked to the POUM so Orwell joined the POUM.

After a time at the Lenin Barracks in Barcelona he was sent to the relatively quiet Aragon Front under Georges Kopp. By January 1937 he was at Alcubierre 1,500 feet (460 m) above sea level, in the depth of winter. There was very little military action and Orwell was shocked by the lack of munitions, food and firewood as well as other extreme deprivations. With his Cadet Corps and police training, Orwell was quickly made a corporal. On the arrival of a British ILP Contingent about three weeks later, Orwell and the other English militiaman, Williams, were sent with them to Monte Oscuro and on to Huesca.

Meanwhile, back in England, Eileen had been handling the issues relating to the publication of The Road to Wigan Pier before setting out for Spain herself, leaving Nellie Limouzin to look after The Stores. Eileen volunteered for a post in John McNair's office and with the help of Georges Kopp paid visits to her husband, bringing him English tea, chocolate and cigars. Orwell had to spend some days in hospital with a poisoned hand and had most of his possessions stolen by the staff. He returned to the front and saw some action in a night attack on the Nationalist trenches where he chased an enemy soldier with a bayonet and bombed an enemy rifle position.

In April, Orwell returned to Barcelona. Wanting to be sent to the Madrid front, which meant he "must join the International Column", he approached a Communist friend attached to the Spanish Medical Aid and explained his case. "Although he did not think much of the Communists, Orwell was still ready to treat them as friends and allies. That would soon change." During the Barcelona May Days Orwell was caught up in the factional fighting. He spent much of the time on a roof, with a stack of novels, but encountered Jon Kimche from his Hampstead days during the stay. The subsequent campaign of lies and distortion carried out by the Communist press, in which the POUM was accused of collaborating with the fascists, had a dramatic effect on Orwell. Instead of joining the International Brigades as he had intended, he decided to return to the Aragon Front. Once the May fighting was over, he was approached by a Communist friend who asked if he still intended transferring to the International Brigades. Orwell expressed surprise that they should still want him, because according to the Communist press he was a fascist.

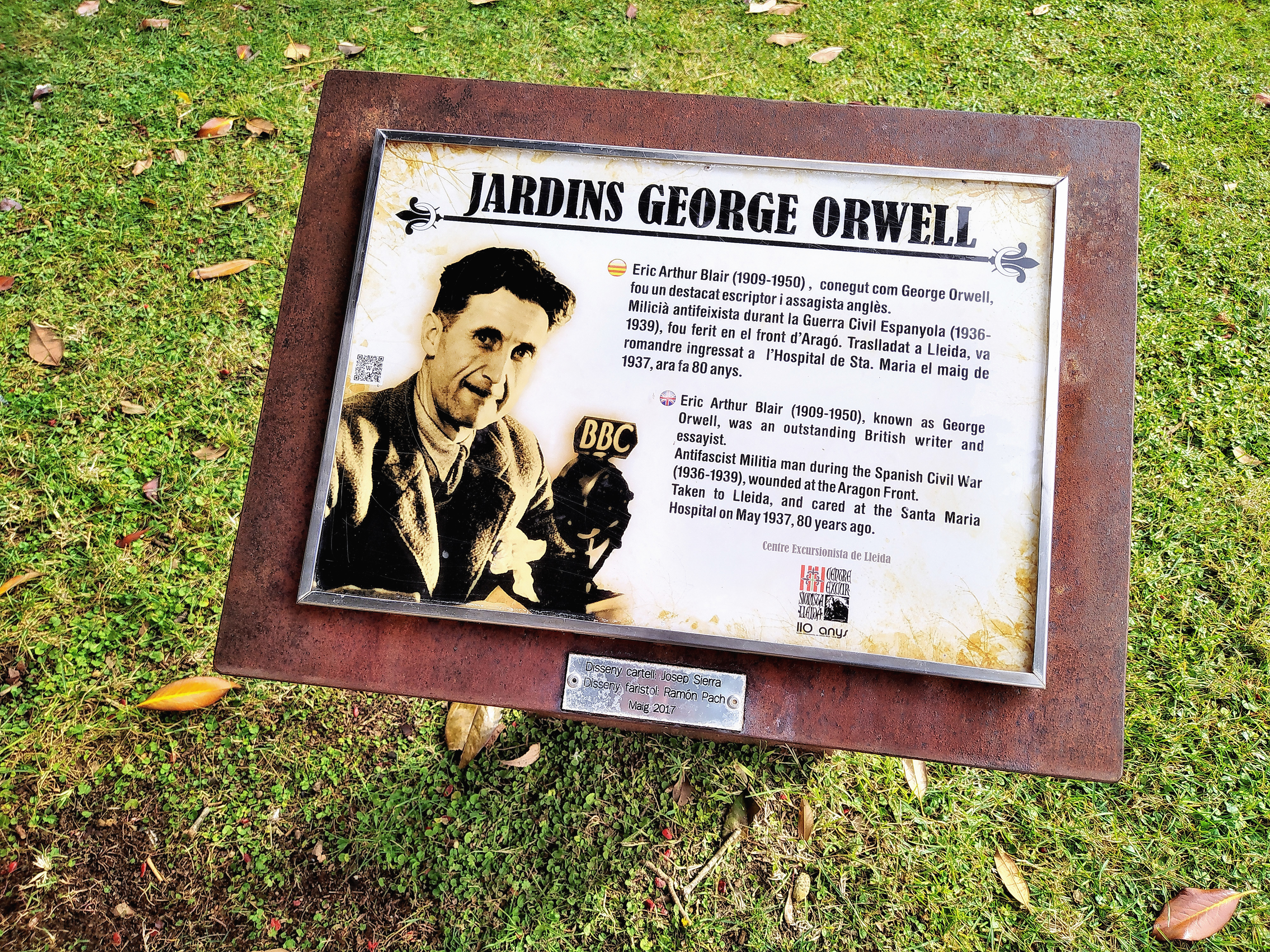
Memorial plaque in Lleida marking where Orwell received treatment at the Hospital Santa Maria de Lleida for his bullet wound to the neck

After his return to the front, he was wounded in the throat by a sniper's bullet. At 6 ft 2 in (1.88 m), Orwell was considerably taller than the Spanish fighters and had been warned against standing against the trench parapet. Unable to speak, and with blood pouring from his mouth, Orwell was carried on a stretcher to Siétamo, loaded on an ambulance and sent to hospital in Lleida. He recovered sufficiently to get up and on 27 May 1937 was sent on to Tarragona and two days later to a POUM sanatorium in the suburbs of Barcelona. The bullet had missed his main artery by the barest margin and his voice was barely audible. It had been such a clean shot that the wound immediately went through the process of cauterisation. He received electrotherapy treatment and was declared medically unfit for service.

By the middle of June, the political situation in Barcelona had deteriorated and the POUM—painted by the pro-Soviet Communists as a Trotskyist organisation—was outlawed and under attack. Members, including Kopp, were arrested and others were in hiding. Orwell and his wife were under threat and had to lie low, (Note: The author states that evidence discovered at the National Historical Archives in Madrid in 1989 of a security police report to the Tribunal for Espionage and High Treason described Eric Blair and his wife Eileen Blair, as "known Trotskyists" and as "linking agents of the ILP and the POUM". Newsinger goes on to state that given Orwell's precarious health, "there can be little doubt that if he had been arrested he would have died in prison".) although they broke cover to try to help Kopp. They finally escaped from Spain by train. In the first week of July 1937 Orwell arrived back at Wallington; on 13 July 1937 a deposition was presented to the Tribunal for Espionage and High Treason in Valencia, charging the Orwells with "rabid Trotskyism", and being agents of the POUM. The trial of the leaders of the POUM and of Orwell (in his absence) took place in Barcelona in October and November 1938. Observing events from French Morocco, Orwell wrote that they were "only a by-product of the Russian Trotskyist trials and from the start every kind of lie, including flagrant absurdities, has been circulated in the Communist press". Orwell's experiences in the Spanish Civil War gave rise to Homage to Catalonia (1938).

In his book, The International Brigades: Fascism, Freedom and the Spanish Civil War, Giles Tremlett writes that according to Soviet files, Orwell and his wife Eileen were spied on in Barcelona in May 1937.

=== Rest and recuperation ===
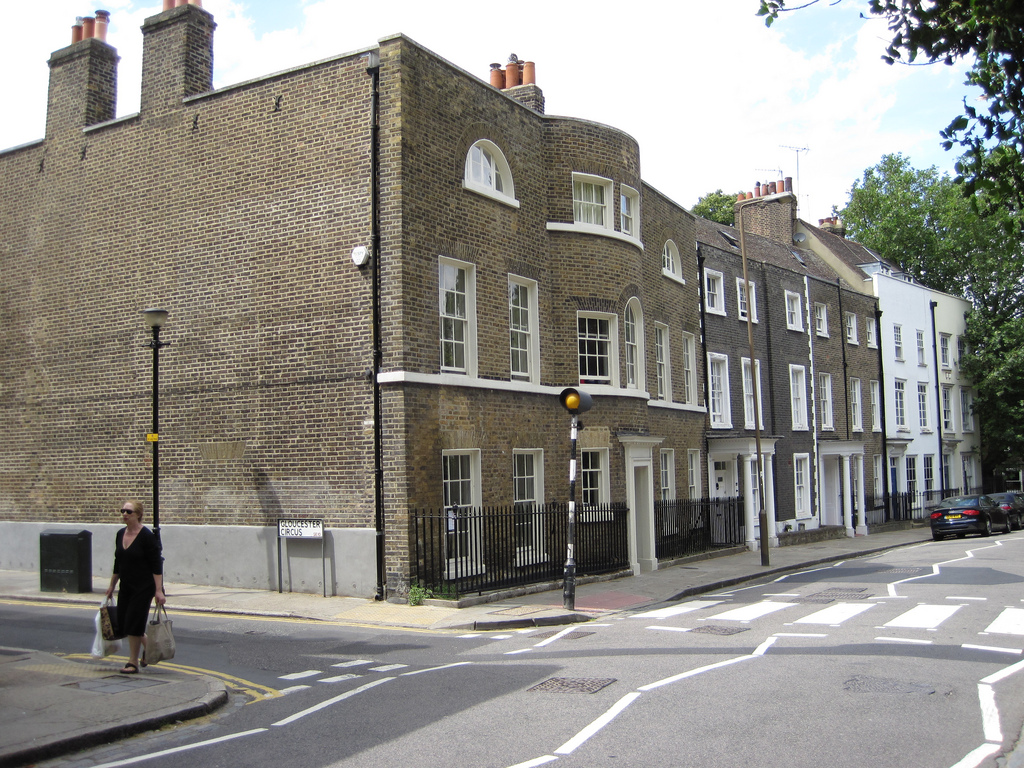
Laurence O'Shaughnessy's former home, the large house on the corner, 24 Crooms Hill, Greenwich, London

Orwell returned to England in June 1937, and stayed at the O'Shaughnessy home at Greenwich. He found his views on the Spanish Civil War out of favour, but praised the book Red Spanish Notebook: the first six months of revolution and the civil war by Juan Ramón Breá and Mary Stanley Low in a review for Time and Tide magazine. Kingsley Martin rejected two of Orwell's works and Gollancz was equally cautious. At the same time, the communist Daily Worker was running an attack on The Road to Wigan Pier, taking out of context Orwell writing that "the working classes smell"; a letter to Gollancz from Orwell threatening libel action brought a stop to this. Orwell was also able to find a more sympathetic publisher for his views in Fredric Warburg of Secker & Warburg. Orwell returned to Wallington, which he found in disarray after his absence. He acquired goats, a cockerel (rooster) he called Henry Ford and a poodle puppy he called Marx; and settled down to animal husbandry and writing Homage to Catalonia.

There were thoughts of going to India to work on The Pioneer, a newspaper in Lucknow, but by March 1938 Orwell's health had deteriorated. He was admitted to Preston Hall Sanatorium at Aylesford, Kent, a Royal British Legion Industries hospital for ex-servicemen to which his brother-in-law Laurence O'Shaughnessy was attached. He was thought initially to be suffering from tuberculosis and stayed in the sanatorium until September. Homage to Catalonia was published in London by Secker & Warburg and was a commercial flop; it re-emerged in the 1950s, following on the success of Orwell's later books.

The novelist L.H. Myers secretly funded a trip to French Morocco for half a year for Orwell to avoid the English winter and recover his health. The Orwells set out in September 1938 via Gibraltar and Tangier to avoid Spanish Morocco and arrived at Marrakesh. They rented a villa on the road to Casablanca and during that time Orwell wrote Coming Up for Air. They arrived back in England on 30 March 1939 and Coming Up for Air was published in June. Orwell spent time in Wallington and Southwold working on an essay about Charles Dickens. In June 1939, Orwell's father died.

=== Second World War and Animal Farm ===
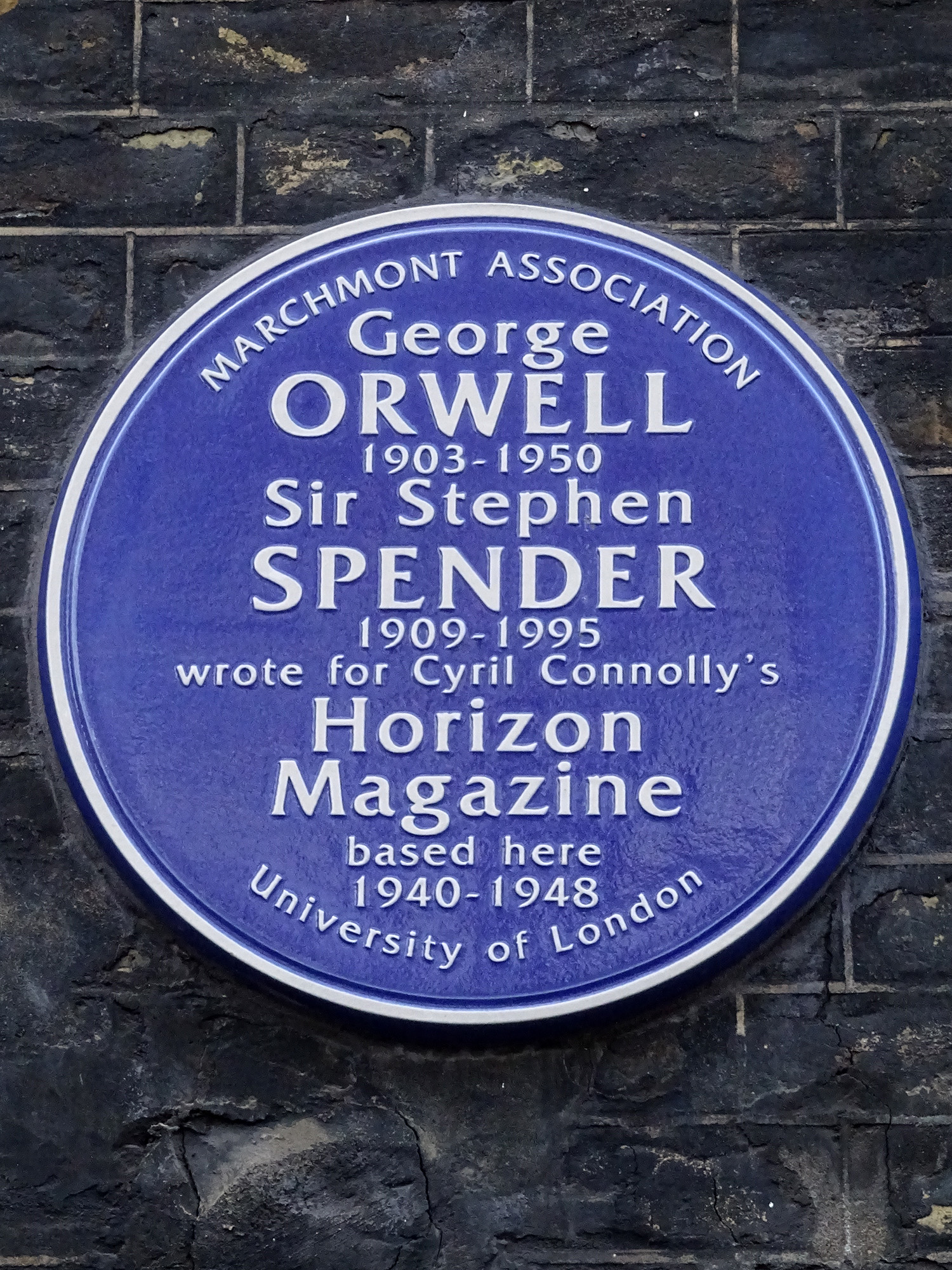
Based in Lansdowne Terrace, Bloomsbury, London, Orwell wrote for Horizon magazine (co-founded by Stephen Spender) from 1940

At the outbreak of the Second World War, Orwell's wife Eileen started working in the Censorship Department of the Ministry of Information in central London, staying during the week with her family in Greenwich. Orwell submitted his name to the Central Register for war work, but nothing transpired. He returned to Wallington, and in late 1939, he wrote material for his first collection of essays, Inside the Whale. For the next year, he was occupied writing reviews for plays, films and books for The Listener, Time and Tide and New Adelphi. On 29 March 1940 his long association with Tribune began with a review of a sergeant's account of Napoleon's retreat from Moscow. At the beginning of 1940, the first edition of Connolly's Horizon appeared, and this provided a new outlet for Orwell's work and new literary contacts. In May the Orwells took lease of a flat in London at Dorset Chambers, Chagford Street, Marylebone. It was the time of the Dunkirk evacuation, and the death in Flanders of Eileen's brother Laurence O'Shaughnessy caused her considerable grief and long-term depression.

Orwell was declared "unfit for any kind of military service" by the Medical Board in June, but soon joined the Home Guard. He shared Tom Wintringham's socialist vision for the Home Guard as a revolutionary People's Militia. His lecture notes for instructing platoon members include advice on street fighting, field fortifications, and the use of mortars. Sergeant Orwell recruited Fredric Warburg to his unit. During the Battle of Britain he spent weekends with Warburg and his new Zionist friend, Tosco Fyvel, at Warburg's house at Twyford, Berkshire. At Wallington, he worked on "England Your England" and in London wrote reviews for periodicals. Visiting Eileen's family in Greenwich brought him face-to-face with the effects of the German Blitz bombings. In 1940, he first worked for the BBC as a producer on their Indian Section, while the broadcaster and writer Venu Chitale was his secretary. In mid-1940, Warburg, Fyvel and Orwell planned Searchlight Books. Eleven volumes eventually appeared, of which Orwell's The Lion and the Unicorn: Socialism and the English Genius, published in February 1941, was the first.

Early in 1941, he began to write for the American Partisan Review which linked Orwell with the New York Intellectuals who were also anti-Stalinist, and contributed to the Gollancz anthology The Betrayal of the Left, written in the light of the Molotov–Ribbentrop Pact. He applied unsuccessfully for a job at the Air Ministry. Meanwhile, he was still writing reviews of books and plays and met the novelist Anthony Powell. He took part in radio broadcasts for the Eastern Service of the BBC. In March the Orwells moved to a seventh-floor flat at Langford Court, St John's Wood, while at Wallington Orwell was "digging for victory" by planting potatoes.

One could not have a better example of the moral and emotional shallowness of our time, than the fact that we are now all more or less pro Stalin. This disgusting murderer is temporarily on our side, and so the purges, etc., are suddenly forgotten.

— George Orwell, in his war-time diary, 3 July 1941

In August 1941, Orwell finally obtained "war work" when he was taken on full-time by the BBC's Eastern Service. He supervised cultural broadcasts to India, to counter propaganda from Nazi Germany designed to undermine imperial links.

At the end of August he had a dinner with H. G. Wells which degenerated into a row because Wells had taken offence at observations Orwell made about him in a Horizon article. This meeting was dramatised in the BBC2 series Encounters in 1992. In October Orwell had a bout of bronchitis; the illness recurred frequently. David Astor was looking for a provocative contributor for The Observer Sunday newspaper, and invited Orwell to write for him; the first article appeared in March 1942. In early 1942 Eileen changed jobs to work at the Ministry of Food, and in mid-1942 the Orwells moved to a larger flat, 10a Mortimer Crescent in Maida Vale/Kilburn.

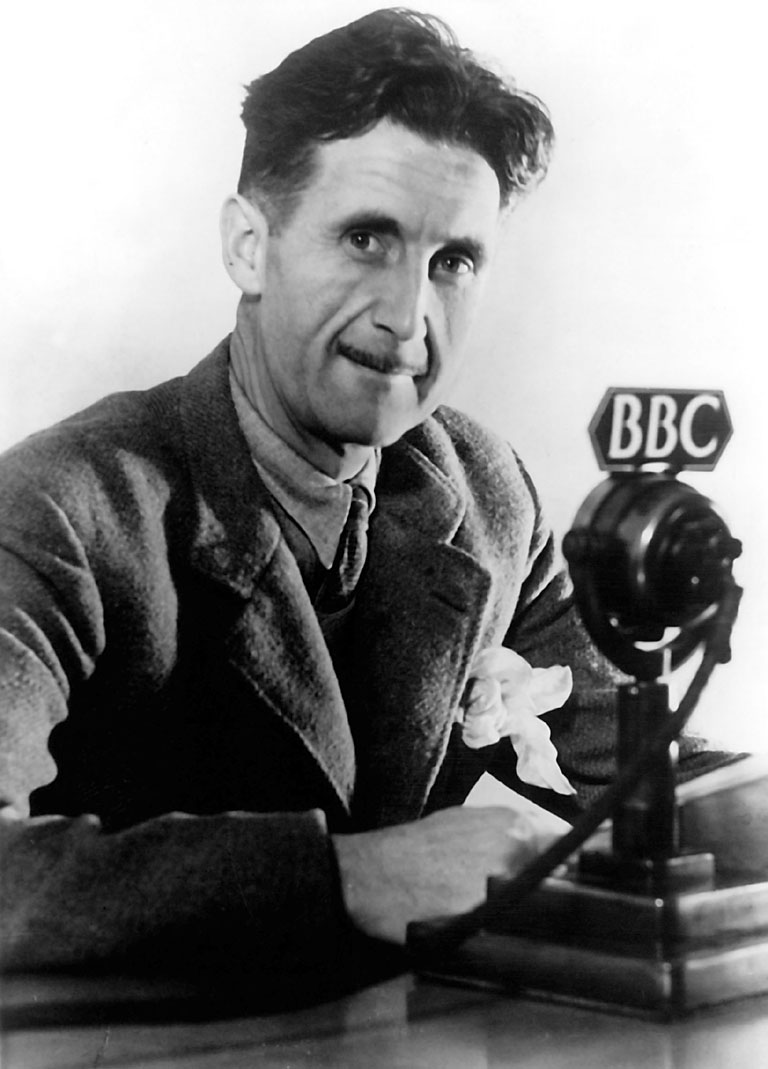
Orwell spoke on many BBC and other broadcasts, but no recordings are known to survive.

At the BBC, Orwell introduced Voice, a literary programme for his Indian broadcasts, and by now was leading an active social life with literary friends, particularly on the political left. Late in 1942 he started writing regularly for the left-wing weekly Tribune directed by Labour MPs Aneurin Bevan and George Strauss. In March 1943, Orwell's mother died, and around this time he told Moore he was starting work on a book, which turned out to be Animal Farm.

In September 1943, Orwell resigned from the BBC following a report confirming his fears that few Indians listened to the broadcasts, but he was also keen to concentrate on writing Animal Farm. On 24 November 1943, six days before his last day of service, his adaptation of the fairy tale, Hans Christian Andersen's The Emperor's New Clothes was broadcast. It was a genre in which he was greatly interested and which appeared on Animal Farm's title page. He resigned from the Home Guard on medical grounds.

In November 1943, Orwell was appointed literary editor at Tribune, where his assistant was his friend Jon Kimche. Orwell was on the staff until early 1945, writing over 80 book reviews, and on 3 December 1943 started his regular personal column "As I Please". He was still writing reviews for other magazines, including Partisan Review, Horizon, and the New York Nation. By April 1944 Animal Farm was ready for publication. Gollancz refused to publish it, considering it an attack on the regime of the Soviet Union, a crucial ally in the war. A similar fate was met from other publishers, including T. S. Eliot at Faber & Faber, until Jonathan Cape agreed to take it.

Orwell and Eileen wanted children, but he was sterile and she may also have been infertile due to uterine cancer. In May the Orwells had the opportunity to adopt a child, thanks to the contacts of Eileen's sister-in-law Gwen O'Shaughnessy, then a doctor in Newcastle upon Tyne. In June a V-1 flying bomb struck Mortimer Crescent and the Orwells had to find somewhere else to live. Orwell had to scrabble around in the rubble for his books, which he had finally managed to transfer from Wallington, carting them away in a wheelbarrow. Another blow was Cape's reversal of his plan to publish Animal Farm. The decision followed his visit to Peter Smollett, an official at the Ministry of Information, who was later identified as a Soviet agent. The Orwells spent time in the North East, near Carlton, County Durham, dealing with the adoption of a boy whom they named Richard Horatio Blair. By September 1944 they had set up home in Islington, at 27b Canonbury Square. Baby Richard joined them there, and Eileen gave up her work at the Ministry of Food to look after her family. Secker & Warburg had agreed to publish Animal Farm, planned for the following March, although it did not appear in print until August 1945. By February 1945 David Astor had invited Orwell to become a war correspondent for The Observer. He went to liberated Paris, then to Germany and Austria, to cities including Cologne and Stuttgart. He was never in the front line, under fire, but followed the troops closely, "sometimes entering a captured town within a day of its fall while dead bodies lay in the streets". Some of his reports were published in the Manchester Evening News.

While he was there, Eileen went into hospital for a hysterectomy. She had not given Orwell much notice about the operation because of worries about the cost, and because she expected to make a speedy recovery; however she died on 29 March 1945 of an allergic reaction to the anaesthetic she was given. It was expected that he would give up his nine-month-old adopted son, but he did not. Orwell returned home and then went back to Europe. He returned to London to cover the 1945 general election at the beginning of July. Animal Farm: A Fairy Story was published in Britain on 17 August 1945, and in America on 26 August 1946.

=== Jura and Nineteen Eighty-Four ===
Animal Farm had particular resonance in the post-war climate and its worldwide success made Orwell a sought-after figure. For the next four years, Orwell mixed journalistic work—mainly for Tribune, The Observer and the Manchester Evening News, though he also contributed to many small-circulation political and literary magazines—with writing his best-known work, Nineteen Eighty-Four, which was published in 1949. He was a leading figure in the so-called Shanghai Club (named after a restaurant in Soho) of left-leaning and émigré journalists, among them E. H. Carr, Sebastian Haffner, Isaac Deutscher, Barbara Ward and Jon Kimche.

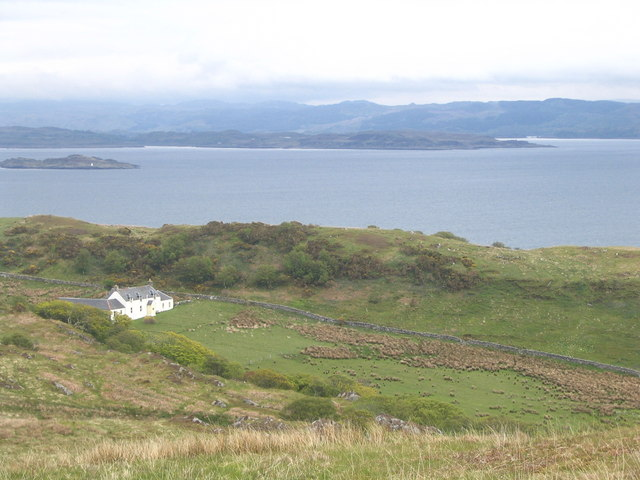
Barnhill farmhouse on the Isle of Jura, Scotland. Orwell completed Nineteen Eighty-Four while living here.

In the year following Eileen's death, he published around 130 articles and a selection of his Critical Essays, while remaining active in various political lobbying campaigns. He employed a housekeeper, Susan Watson, to look after his adopted son at the Islington flat, which visitors now described as "bleak". In September he spent a fortnight on the island of Jura in the Inner Hebrides and saw it as a place to escape from the hassle of London literary life. David Astor was instrumental in arranging a place for Orwell on Jura. Astor's family owned Scottish estates in the area and a fellow Old Etonian, Robin Fletcher, had a property on the island. In late 1945 and early 1946 Orwell made several hopeless and unwelcome marriage proposals to younger women, including Celia Kirwan; Ann Popham, who happened to live in the same block of flats; and Sonia Brownell, one of Connolly's coterie at the Horizon office. Orwell suffered a tubercular haemorrhage in February 1946 but disguised his illness. In 1945 or early 1946, while still living at Canonbury Square, Orwell wrote an article on "British Cookery", complete with recipes, commissioned by the British Council. Given the post-war shortages, both parties agreed not to publish it. His sister Marjorie died in May.

On 22 May 1946, Orwell set off with his two-year-old son, who he is said to have treated as a "mini-adult", to live on Jura in Barnhill, an abandoned farmhouse without outbuildings. Conditions at the farmhouse were primitive but the natural history and the challenge of improving the place appealed to Orwell. His son later learned that Orwell was afraid of passing tuberculosis on to him through hugging or kissing, and worried that this might interfere with their ability to bond. Orwell returned to London in late 1946 and picked up his literary journalism again. Now a well-known writer, he was swamped with work. Apart from a visit to Jura in the new year he stayed in London for one of the coldest British winters on record; with such a national shortage of fuel that he burnt his furniture and his child's toys. The heavy smog in the days before the Clean Air Act 1956 did little to help his health, about which he was reticent, keeping clear of medical attention. Meanwhile, he had to cope with rival claims of publishers Gollancz and Warburg for publishing rights. About this time he co-edited a collection titled British Pamphleteers with Reginald Reynolds.

As a result of the success of Animal Farm, Orwell was expecting a large bill from the Inland Revenue and he contacted a firm of accountants. The firm advised Orwell to establish a company to own his copyright and to receive his royalties and set up a "service agreement" so that he could draw a salary; "George Orwell Productions Ltd" (GOP Ltd) was set up on 12 September 1947. Orwell left London for Jura on 10 April 1947. In July he ended the lease on the Wallington cottage. Back on Jura he worked on Nineteen Eighty-Four. During that time his sister's family visited, and Orwell led a disastrous boating expedition, on 19 August, which nearly led to loss of life whilst trying to cross the notorious Gulf of Corryvreckan and gave him a soaking which was not good for his health. In December a chest specialist was summoned from Glasgow who pronounced Orwell seriously ill, and a week before Christmas 1947 he was in Hairmyres Hospital. Tuberculosis was diagnosed and the request for permission to import the new medicine streptomycin to treat Orwell went as far as Aneurin Bevan, then Minister of Health. David Astor helped with supply and payment and Orwell began his course of streptomycin on 19 or 20 February 1948. By the end of July 1948 Orwell was able to return to Jura and by December he had finished the manuscript of Nineteen Eighty-Four. In January 1949, in a very weak condition, he set off for a sanatorium at Cranham, Gloucestershire. However, streptomycin could not be continued, as he developed toxic epidermal necrolysis, a rare side effect.

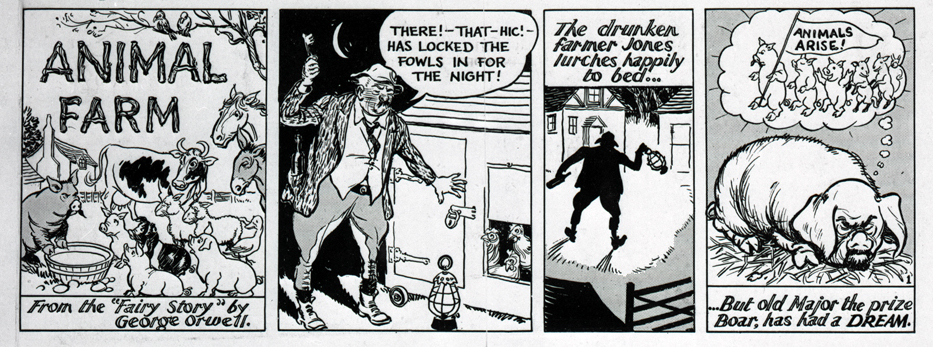
One of the Animal Farm cartoon strips produced for the Cold War anti-communist department of the British Foreign Office, the Information Research Department (IRD)

The sanatorium at Cranham consisted of a series of small wooden chalets or huts in a remote part of the Cotswolds near Stroud. Visitors were shocked by Orwell's appearance and concerned by the shortcomings and ineffectiveness of the treatment. Friends were worried about his finances, but by now he was comparatively well off. He was writing to many of his friends, including Jacintha Buddicom, who had "rediscovered" him. In March 1949 he was visited by Celia Kirwan, who had just started working for a Foreign Office unit, the Information Research Department (IRD), set up by the Labour government to publish anti-communist propaganda; Orwell gave her a list of people he considered to be unsuitable as IRD authors because of their pro-communist leanings. Orwell's list, not published until 2003, consisted mainly of writers, and some actors and Labour MPs. To further promote Animal Farm, the IRD commissioned cartoon strips, drawn by Norman Pett, to be placed in newspapers across the globe. Orwell received more streptomycin treatment and improved slightly. This repeat dose of streptomycin, especially after the side effect had been noticed, has been called "ill-advised". He then received penicillin, presumably to treat his bronchiectasis; doctors knew it was ineffective against tuberculosis. In June 1949, Nineteen Eighty-Four was published to critical acclaim.

=== Final months and death ===
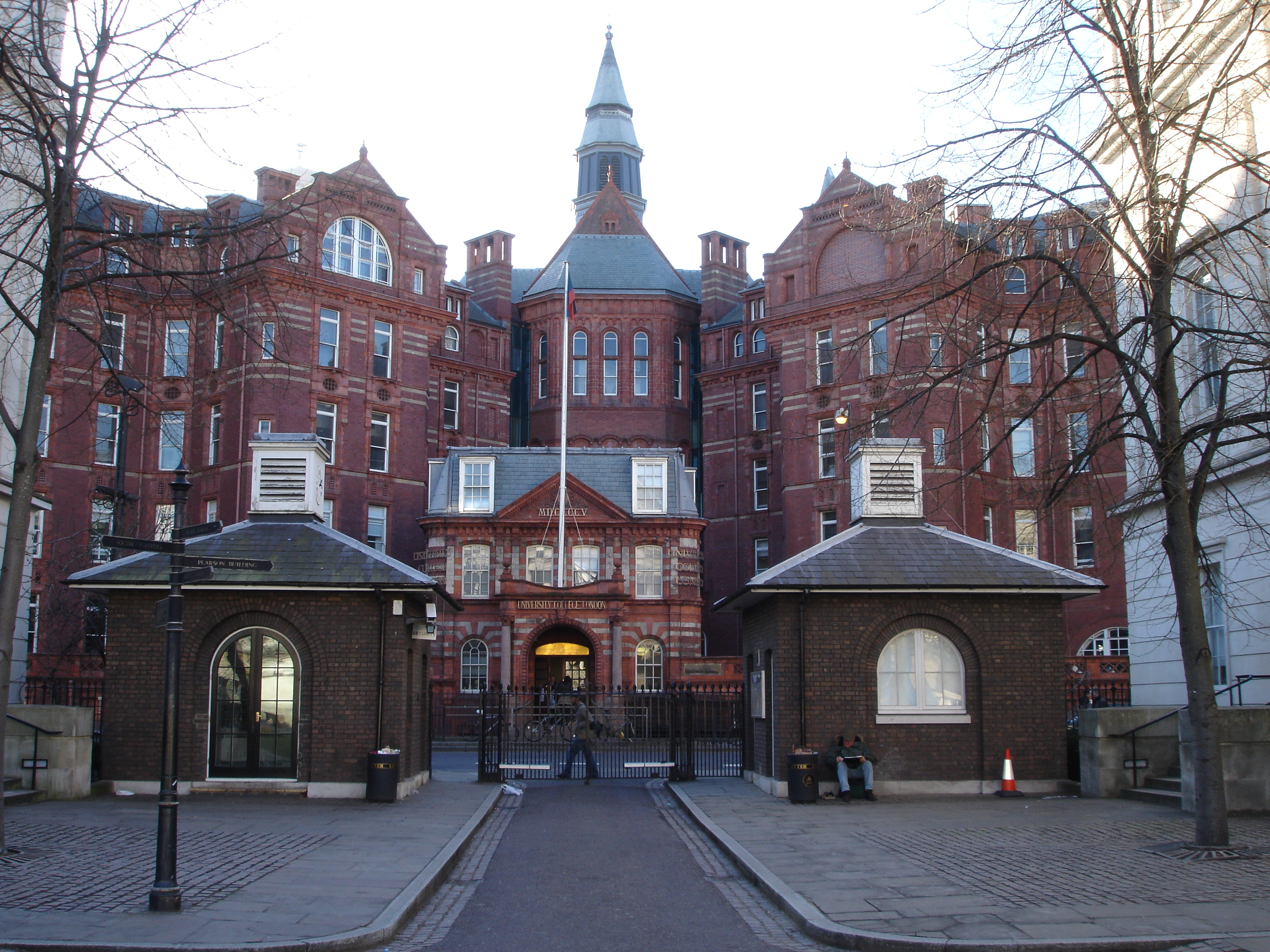
University College Hospital in London, where Orwell died

Orwell's health continued to decline. In mid-1949, he courted Sonia Brownell, believed to be the model for Julia, the heroine of Nineteen Eighty-Four, and they announced their engagement in September. Shortly afterwards he was removed to University College Hospital in London. Brownell took charge of Orwell's affairs and attended him diligently in the hospital. Friends of Orwell stated that Brownell helped him through the painful last months of his life and, according to Anthony Powell, cheered Orwell up greatly. However, others have argued that she may have been attracted to him primarily because of his fame.

In September 1949, Orwell invited his accountant Jack Harrison to visit him at the hospital, and Harrison claimed that Orwell then asked him to become director of GOP Ltd and to manage the company, but there was no independent witness. Orwell's wedding took place in the hospital room on 13 October 1949, with David Astor as best man. Further meetings were held with his accountant, at which Harrison and the Blairs were confirmed as directors of the company. Orwell's health was in decline again by Christmas. Harrison visited later and claimed that Orwell had given him 25% of the company. At the age of 46, Orwell suffered a pulmonary artery rupture due to complications of tuberculosis, and died in the early morning of 21 January 1950.

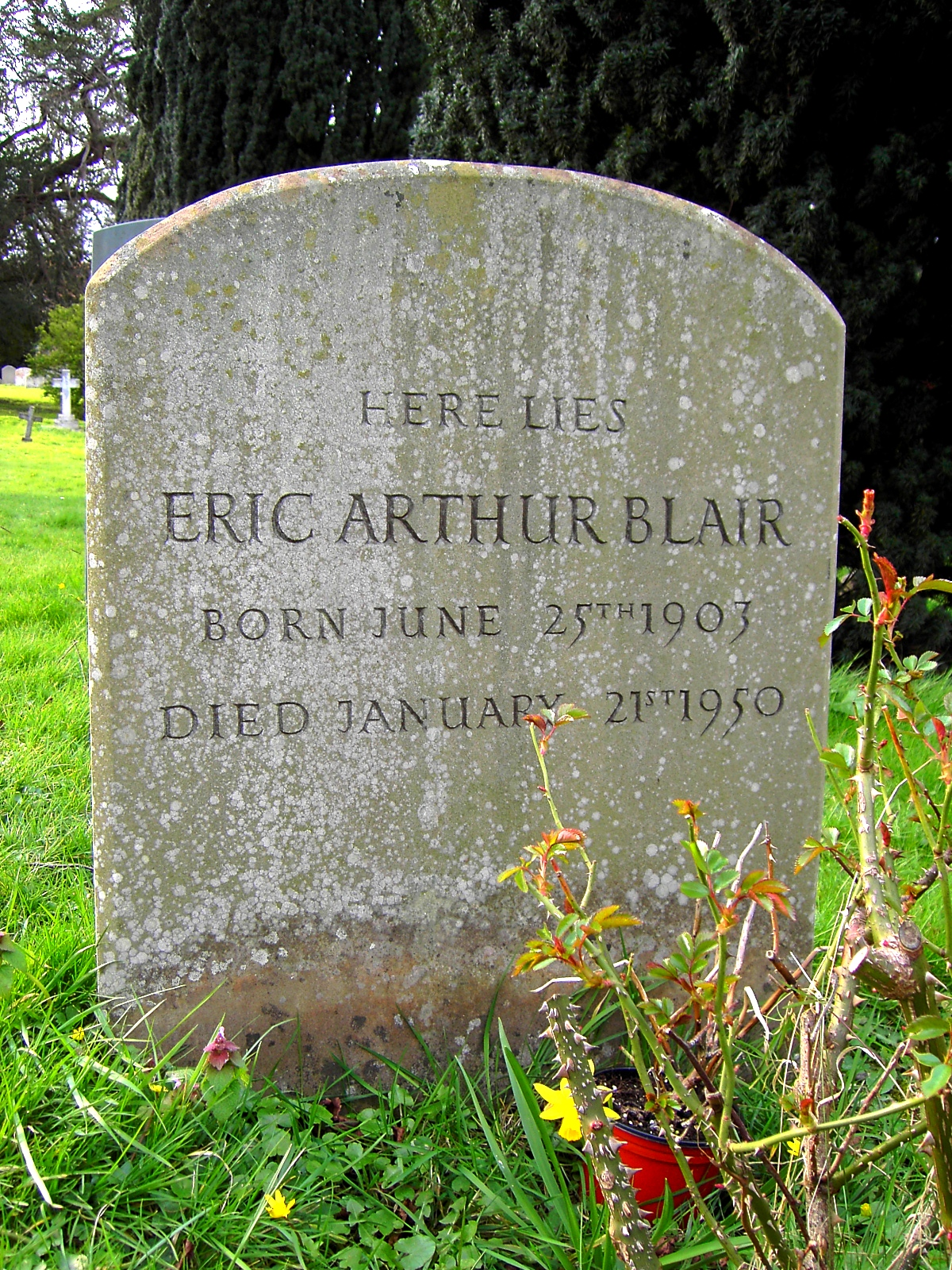
Orwell's grave in All Saints' churchyard, Sutton Courtenay, Oxfordshire

Orwell had requested to be buried "according to the rites of the Church of England, in the nearest convenient cemetery". The graveyards in central London had no space, and so in an effort to ensure his last wishes could be fulfilled, his widow appealed to his friends to see whether any of them knew of a church with space in its graveyard. David Astor arranged for Orwell to be interred in the churchyard of All Saints' Church, Sutton Courtenay, on 26 January 1950. The funeral was organised by Anthony Powell and Malcolm Muggeridge. Powell chose the hymns: "All people that on earth do dwell", "Guide me, O thou great Redeemer" and "Ten thousand times ten thousand".

Orwell's adopted son, Richard Horatio Blair, was brought up by Orwell's sister Avril, his legal guardian, and her husband, Bill Dunn. In 1979, Sonia Brownell brought a High Court action against Harrison when he declared an intention to subdivide his 25 per cent share of the company between his three children. For Sonia, the consequence of this manoeuvre would have made getting overall control of the company three times more difficult. She was considered to have a strong case, but was becoming increasingly ill and eventually was persuaded to settle out of court on 2 November 1980. She died on 11 December 1980, aged 62.

== Writing ==
During most of his career, Orwell was best known for his journalism, in essays, reviews, columns in newspapers and magazines and in his books of reportage: Down and Out in Paris and London (describing a period of poverty in these cities), The Road to Wigan Pier (describing the living conditions of the poor in northern England, and class division generally) and Homage to Catalonia. According to Irving Howe, Orwell was "the best English essayist since Hazlitt, perhaps since Dr Johnson".

Modern readers are more often introduced to Orwell as a novelist, particularly through his enormously successful Animal Farm and Nineteen Eighty-Four. The former is often thought to reflect degeneration in the Soviet Union after the Russian Revolution and the rise of Stalinism; the latter, life under totalitarian rule. In 1984, Nineteen Eighty-Four and Ray Bradbury's Fahrenheit 451 were honoured with the Prometheus Award for their contributions to dystopian literature. In 2011 he received it again for Animal Farm. In 2003, Nineteen Eighty-Four was listed at number 8 and Animal Farm at number 46 on the BBC's The Big Read poll. In 2021, readers of the New York Times Book Review rated Nineteen Eighty-Four third in a list of "The best books of the past 125 years".

=== Literary influences ===
In an autobiographical piece that Orwell sent to the editors of Twentieth Century Authors in 1940, he wrote:

The writers I care about most and never grow tired of are: Shakespeare, Swift, Fielding, Dickens, Charles Reade, Flaubert and, among modern writers, James Joyce, T. S. Eliot and D. H. Lawrence. But I believe the modern writer who has influenced me most is W. Somerset Maugham, whom I admire immensely for his power of telling a story straightforwardly and without frills.

Elsewhere, Orwell praised the works of Jack London, especially his book The Road. Orwell's investigation of poverty in The Road to Wigan Pier strongly resembles that of Jack London's The People of the Abyss, in which the American journalist disguises himself as an out-of-work sailor to investigate the lives of the poor in London. In his essay "Politics vs. Literature: An Examination of Gulliver's Travels" (1946) Orwell wrote: "If I had to make a list of six books which were to be preserved when all others were destroyed, I would certainly put Gulliver's Travels among them." On H. G. Wells he wrote: "The minds of all of us, and therefore the physical world, would be perceptibly different if Wells had never existed."

Orwell was an admirer of Arthur Koestler and became a close friend during the three years that Koestler and his wife Mamain spent at the cottage of Bwlch Ocyn in the Vale of Ffestiniog. Orwell reviewed Koestler's Darkness at Noon for the New Statesman in 1941, saying:

Brilliant as this book is as a novel, and a piece of brilliant literature, it is probably most valuable as an interpretation of the Moscow "confessions" by someone with an inner knowledge of totalitarian methods. What was frightening about these trials was not the fact that they happened—for obviously such things are necessary in a totalitarian society—but the eagerness of Western intellectuals to justify them.

Other writers Orwell admired included Ralph Waldo Emerson, George Gissing, Graham Greene, Herman Melville, Henry Miller, Tobias Smollett, Mark Twain, Joseph Conrad, and Yevgeny Zamyatin. He was both an admirer and a critic of Rudyard Kipling, praising Kipling as a gifted writer and a "good bad poet" whose work is "spurious" and "morally insensitive and aesthetically disgusting", but undeniably seductive and able to speak to certain aspects of reality more effectively than more enlightened authors. He had a similarly ambivalent attitude to G. K. Chesterton, whom he regarded as a writer of considerable talent who had chosen to devote himself to "Roman Catholic propaganda", and to Evelyn Waugh, who was, he wrote, "about as good a novelist as one can be (i.e. as novelists go today) while holding untenable opinions".

=== Literary critic ===
Throughout his life Orwell continually supported himself as a book-reviewer. His reviews are well known and have had an influence on literary criticism. He wrote in the conclusion to his 1940 essay on Charles Dickens:

When one reads any strongly individual piece of writing, one has the impression of seeing a face somewhere behind the page. It is not necessarily the actual face of the writer. I feel this very strongly with Swift, with Defoe, with Fielding, Stendhal, Thackeray, Flaubert, though in several cases I do not know what these people looked like and do not want to know. What one sees is the face that the writer ought to have. Well, in the case of Dickens I see a face that is not quite the face of Dickens's photographs, though it resembles it. It is the face of a man of about forty, with a small beard and a high colour. He is laughing, with a touch of anger in his laughter, but no triumph, no malignity. It is the face of a man who is always fighting against something, but who fights in the open and is not frightened, the face of a man who is generously angry—in other words, of a nineteenth-century liberal, a free intelligence, a type hated with equal hatred by all the smelly little orthodoxies which are now contending for our souls.

George Woodcock suggested that the last two sentences also describe Orwell.

Orwell wrote a critique of George Bernard Shaw's play Arms and the Man. He considered this Shaw's best play and the most likely to remain socially relevant. His 1945 essay In Defence of P. G. Wodehouse argues that his broadcasts from Germany during the war did not really make him a traitor. He accused the Ministry of Information of exaggerating Wodehouse's actions for propaganda purposes.

=== Food writing ===
In 1946, the British Council commissioned Orwell to write an essay on British food as part of a drive to promote British relations abroad. In his essay titled "British Cookery", Orwell described the British diet as "a simple, rather heavy, perhaps slightly barbarous diet" and where "hot drinks are acceptable at most hours of the day". He wrote that high tea in the United Kingdom consisted of a variety of savoury and sweet dishes, but "no tea would be considered a good one if it did not include at least one kind of cake", before adding "as well as cakes, biscuits are much eaten at tea-time". Orwell included his own recipe for marmalade, a popular British spread on toast. However, the British Council declined to publish the essay on the grounds that it was too problematic to write about food at the time of strict rationing in the UK following the war. In 2019, the essay was discovered in the British Council's archives along with the rejection letter. The British Council issued an official apology to Orwell over the rejection of the commissioned essay, publishing the original essay along with the rejection letter.

== Personal life ==
=== Childhood ===
Jacintha Buddicom's account, Eric & Us, provides an insight into Blair's childhood. She quoted his sister Avril that "he was essentially an aloof, undemonstrative person" and said herself of his friendship with the Buddicoms: "I do not think he needed any other friends beyond the schoolfriend he occasionally and appreciatively referred to as 'CC'". She could not recall him having schoolfriends to stay and exchange visits as her brother Prosper often did in holidays. Cyril Connolly provides an account of Blair as a child in Enemies of Promise. Years later, Blair mordantly recalled his prep school in the essay "Such, Such Were the Joys", claiming among other things that he "was made to study like a dog" to earn a scholarship. Jacintha Buddicom repudiated Orwell's schoolboy misery described in the essay, stating that "he was a specially happy child". She noted that he did not like his name because it reminded him of a book he greatly disliked—Eric, or, Little by Little, a Victorian boys' school story.

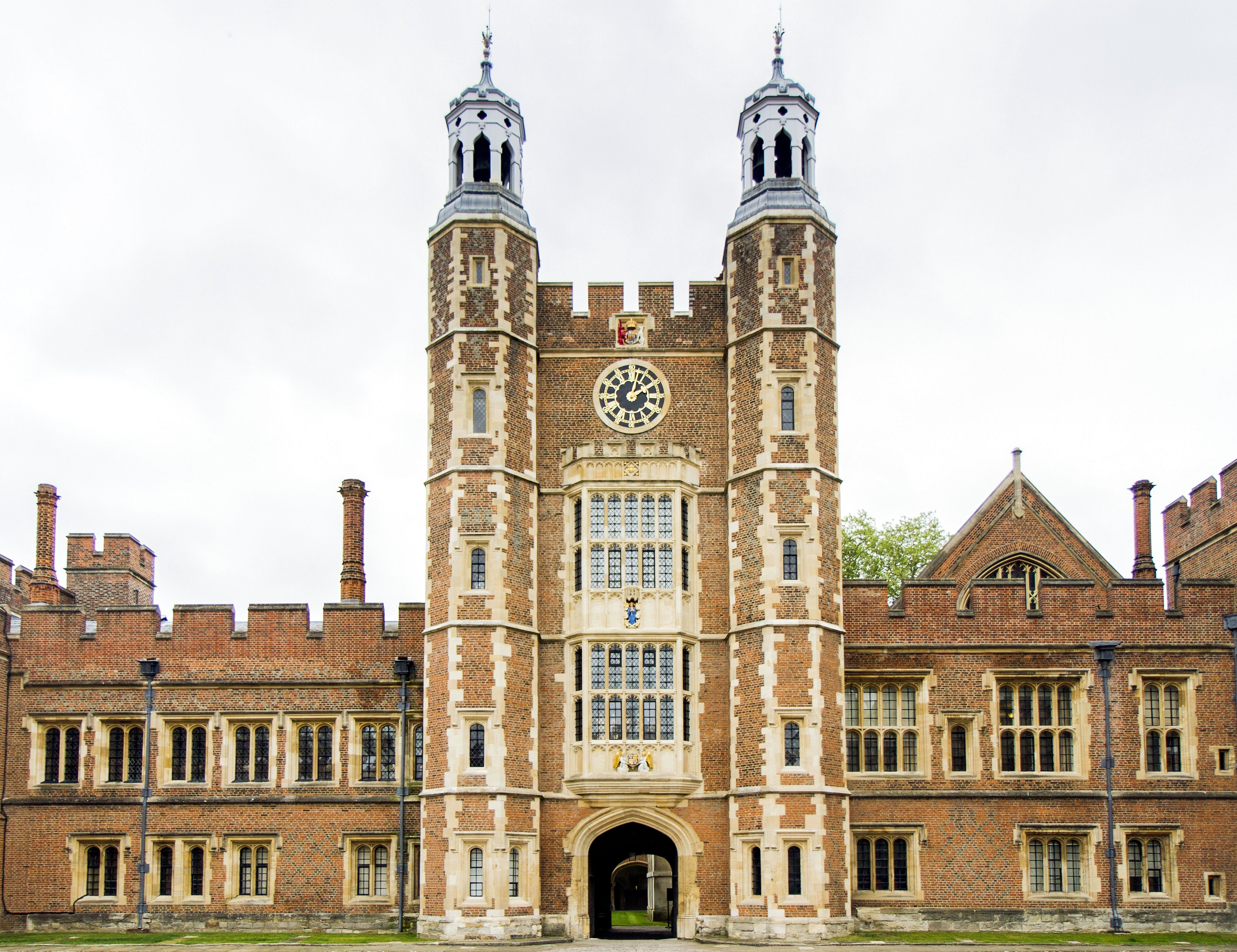
Orwell's time at Eton College was formative in his attitude and his later career as a writer.

Connolly remarked of him as a schoolboy, "The remarkable thing about Orwell was that alone among the boys he was an intellectual and not a parrot for he thought for himself". At Eton, John Vaughan Wilkes, his former headmaster's son at St Cyprians, recalled that "he was extremely argumentative—about anything—and criticising the masters and criticising the other boys [...] We enjoyed arguing with him. He would generally win the arguments—or think he had anyhow."

Blair liked to carry out practical jokes. Buddicom recalls him swinging from the luggage rack in a railway carriage like an orangutan to frighten a woman passenger out of the compartment. At Eton, he played tricks on John Crace, his housemaster, among which was to enter a spoof advertisement in a college magazine implying pederasty. Gow, his tutor, said he "made himself as big a nuisance as he could" and "was a very unattractive boy". Later Blair was expelled from the crammer at Southwold for sending a dead rat as a birthday present to the town surveyor.

Blair had an interest in natural history which stemmed from his childhood. In letters from school he wrote about caterpillars and butterflies, and Buddicom recalls his keen interest in ornithology. He also enjoyed fishing and shooting rabbits, and conducting experiments as in cooking a hedgehog or shooting down a jackdaw from the Eton roof to dissect it. His zeal for scientific experiments extended to explosives—again Buddicom recalls a cook giving notice because of the noise. Later in Southwold, his sister Avril recalled him blowing up the garden. When teaching he enthused his students with his nature-rambles both at Southwold and at Hayes. His adult diaries are permeated with his observations on nature.

=== Relationships and marriage ===
Blair's adolescent idyll with Buddicom was shattered in the summer of 1921, when he attempted to take their relationship further than Buddicom was ready for, in what was characterised as a botched seduction. When Blair left for Burma the following year, he wrote to Buddicom but she soon stopped replying to his letters. Returning from Burma in 1927, Blair went in search of Buddicom at her family home to ask her to marry him but could not find her. What had been a very serious business indeed for Blair had apparently been dismissed by Buddicom, leaving Blair potentially emotionally vulnerable. Buddicom and Blair revisited those memories briefly in 1949 in three letters and three telephone calls but without closure.

Mabel Fierz, who later became Blair's confidante, said: "He used to say the one thing he wished in this world was that he'd been attractive to women. He liked women and had many girlfriends I think in Burma. He had a girl in Southwold and another girl in London. He was rather a womaniser, yet he was afraid he wasn't attractive."

Brenda Salkield (Southwold) preferred friendship to any deeper relationship and maintained a correspondence with Blair for many years, particularly as a sounding board for his ideas. She wrote: "He was a great letter writer. Endless letters, and I mean when he wrote you a letter he wrote pages." His correspondence with Eleanor Jacques (London) was more prosaic, dwelling on a closer relationship and referring to past rendezvous or planning future ones in London and Burnham Beeches.

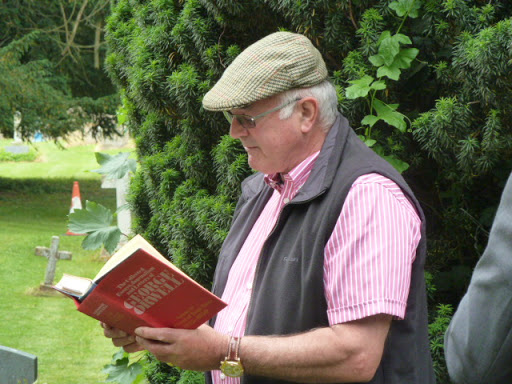
Orwell's adopted son Richard in 2018 reciting his father's work at his graveside during an annual visit to All Saints' churchyard, Sutton Courtenay

When Orwell was in the sanatorium in Kent, his wife Eileen's friend Lydia Jackson visited. He invited her for a walk and out of sight "an awkward situation arose." Jackson was to be the most critical of Orwell's marriage to Eileen, but their later correspondence hints at a complicity. At the time Eileen was more concerned about Orwell's closeness to Brenda Salkield. Orwell had an affair with his secretary at Tribune which caused Eileen much distress, and others have been mooted. In a letter to Ann Popham he wrote: "I was sometimes unfaithful to Eileen, and I also treated her badly, and I think she treated me badly, too, at times, but it was a real marriage, in the sense that we had been through awful struggles together and she understood all about my work, etc." Similarly he suggested to Celia Kirwan that they had both been unfaithful. There are several testaments that it was a well-matched and happy marriage.

In June 1944, Orwell and Eileen adopted a three-week-old boy they named Richard Horatio. According to Richard, Orwell was a wonderful father who gave him devoted, if rather rugged, attention and a great degree of freedom.

Orwell was very lonely after Eileen's death in 1945 and was desperate for a wife, both as companion for himself and as mother for Richard. He proposed marriage to four women, including Celia Kirwan, and eventually Sonia Brownell accepted. Orwell had met her when she was assistant to Cyril Connolly, at Horizon literary magazine. They were married on 13 October 1949, only three months before Orwell's death. Some maintain that Sonia was the model for Julia in Nineteen Eighty-Four.

=== Social interactions ===
Orwell was noted for very close and enduring friendships with a few friends, but these were generally people with a similar background or with a similar level of literary ability. Ungregarious, he was out of place in a crowd and his discomfort was exacerbated when he was outside his own class. Though representing himself as a spokesman for the common man, he often appeared out of place with real working people. His brother-in-law Humphrey Dakin, a "Hail fellow, well met" type, who took him to a local pub in Leeds, said that he was told by the landlord: "Don't bring that bugger in here again."

Adrian Fierz commented "He wasn't interested in racing or greyhounds or pub crawling or shove ha'penny. He just did not have much in common with people who did not share his intellectual interests." Awkwardness attended many of his encounters with working-class representatives, as with Pollitt and McNair, but his courtesy and good manners were often commented on. Jack Common observed on meeting him for the first time, "Right away manners, and more than manners—breeding—showed through."

In his tramping days, he did domestic work for a time. His extreme politeness was recalled by a member of the family he worked for; she declared that the family referred to him as "Laurel" after the film comedian. With his gangling figure and awkwardness, Orwell's friends often saw him as a figure of fun. Geoffrey Gorer commented "He was awfully likely to knock things off tables, trip over things. I mean, he was a gangling, physically badly co-ordinated young man. I think his feeling [was] that even the inanimate world was against him." At the BBC in the 1940s, "everybody would pull his leg" and Spender described him as having real entertainment value "like, as I say, watching a Charlie Chaplin movie". A friend of Eileen's reminisced about her tolerance and humour, often at Orwell's expense.

One biography of Orwell accused him of having had an authoritarian streak. One of his former pupils recalled being beaten so hard he could not sit down for a week. When sharing a flat with Orwell, Heppenstall came home late one night in an advanced stage of loud inebriation. The upshot was that Heppenstall ended up with a bloody nose and was locked in a room. When he complained, Orwell hit him across the legs with a shooting stick and Heppenstall then had to defend himself with a chair. Years later, after Orwell's death, Heppenstall wrote a dramatic account of the incident called "The Shooting Stick".

Orwell got on well with young people. The pupil he beat considered him the best of teachers and the young recruits in Barcelona tried to drink him under the table without success.

In the wake of his most famous works, he attracted many uncritical hangers-on, but many others who sought him found him aloof and even dull. With his soft voice, he was sometimes shouted down or excluded from discussions. At this time, he was severely ill; it was wartime or the austerity period after it; during the war his wife suffered from depression; and after her death he was lonely and unhappy. In addition to that, he always lived frugally and seemed unable to care for himself properly. As a result of all this, people found his circumstances bleak. Some, like Michael Ayrton, called him "Gloomy George", but others developed the idea that he was an "English secular saint".

=== Lifestyle ===
Orwell was a heavy smoker, who rolled his own cigarettes from strong shag tobacco, despite his bronchial condition. His penchant for the rugged life often took him to cold and damp situations. Described by The Economist as "perhaps the 20th century's best chronicler of English culture", Orwell considered fish and chips, football, the pub, strong tea, cut-price chocolate, the movies, and radio among the chief comforts for the working class. He advocated a patriotic defence of a British way of life that could not be trusted to intellectuals or, by implication, the state:

We are a nation of flower-lovers, but also a nation of stamp-collectors, pigeon-fanciers, amateur carpenters, coupon-snippers, darts-players, crossword-puzzle fans. All the culture that is most truly native centres round things which even when they are communal are not official—the pub, the football match, the back garden, the fireside and the "nice cup of tea". The liberty of the individual is still believed in, almost as in the nineteenth century. But this has nothing to do with economic liberty, the right to exploit others for profit. It is the liberty to have a home of your own, to do what you like in your spare time, to choose your own amusements instead of having them chosen for you from above.

By putting the tea in first and stirring as one pours, one can exactly regulate the amount of milk, whereas one is likely to put in too much milk if one does it the other way round.

— One of Orwell's eleven rules for making tea from his essay "A Nice Cup of Tea", which appeared in the London Evening Standard, 12 January 1946

Orwell enjoyed strong tea—he had Fortnum & Mason's tea brought to him in Catalonia. His 1946 essay "A Nice Cup of Tea", appeared in the London Evening Standard article on how to make tea. He appreciated English beer, taken regularly and moderately, despised drinkers of lager, and wrote about an imagined, ideal British pub in his 1946 Evening Standard article "The Moon Under Water". Not as particular about food, he enjoyed the wartime "Victory Pie" and extolled canteen food at the BBC. He preferred traditional English dishes, such as roast beef, and kippers.

His dress sense was unpredictable and usually casual. In Southwold, he had the best cloth from the local tailor, but was equally happy in his tramping outfit. His attire in the Spanish Civil War, along with his size-12 boots, was a source of amusement. David Astor described him as looking like a prep school master, while according to the Special Branch dossier, Orwell's tendency to dress "in Bohemian fashion" revealed that the author was "a Communist".

Orwell's confusing approach to matters of social decorum—on the one hand expecting a working-class guest to dress for dinner and, on the other, slurping tea out of a saucer at the BBC canteen—helped stoke his reputation as an English eccentric.

== Views ==
=== Religion ===
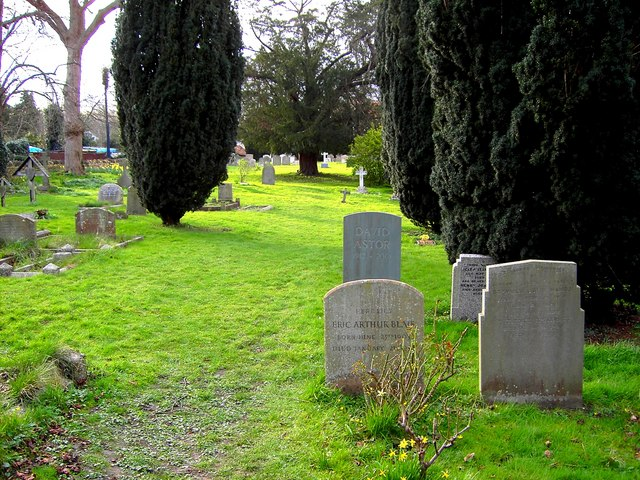
Orwell was an atheist and a robust critic of Christianity. Nevertheless, he was sentimentally attached to church services, and was buried in All Saints' parish churchyard in Sutton Courtenay, Oxfordshire.

Orwell was an atheist who identified himself with the humanist outlook on life. Despite this, and despite his criticisms of both religious doctrine and religious organisations, he nevertheless regularly participated in the social and civic life of the church, including by attending Church of England Holy Communion. Acknowledging this contradiction, he once said: "It seems rather mean to go to HC [Holy Communion] when one doesn't believe, but I have passed myself off for pious & there is nothing for it but to keep up with the deception." He had two Anglican marriages and left instructions for an Anglican funeral. Orwell was also well-read in Biblical literature and could quote lengthy passages from the Book of Common Prayer from memory.

His extensive knowledge of the Bible came coupled with unsparing criticism of its philosophy, and as an adult he could not bring himself to believe in its tenets. He said in part V of his essay, "Such, Such Were the Joys", that "Till about the age of fourteen I believed in God, and believed that the accounts given of him were true. But I was well aware that I did not love him." Orwell directly contrasted Christianity with secular humanism in his essay "Lear, Tolstoy and the Fool", finding the latter philosophy more palatable and less "self-interested". The literary critic James Wood wrote that in the struggle, as he saw it, between Christianity and humanism, "Orwell was on the humanist side, of course".

Orwell's writing was often explicitly critical of religion, and Christianity in particular. He found the church to be a "selfish [...] church of the landed gentry" with its establishment "out of touch" with the majority of its communicants and altogether a pernicious influence on public life. His contradictory and sometimes ambiguous views about the social benefits of religious affiliation mirrored the dichotomies between his public and private lives: Stephen Ingle wrote that it was as if the writer George Orwell "vaunted" his unbelief while Eric Blair the individual retained "a deeply ingrained religiosity".

=== Politics ===
Orwell liked to provoke arguments by challenging the status quo, but he was also a traditionalist with a love of old English values. He criticised and satirised, from the inside, the various social milieux in which he found himself. In his Adelphi days, he described himself as a "Tory-anarchist". Of colonialism in Burmese Days, he portrays the English colonists as a "dull, decent people, cherishing and fortifying their dullness behind a quarter of a million bayonets". Writing for Le Progrès Civique, Orwell described the British colonial government in Burma and India:

The government of all the Indian provinces under the control of the British Empire is of necessity despotic, because only the threat of force can subdue a population of several million subjects. But this despotism is latent. It hides behind a mask of democracy... Care is taken to avoid technical and industrial training. This rule, observed throughout India, aims to stop India from becoming an industrial country capable of competing with England ... Foreign competition is prevented by an insuperable barrier of prohibitive customs tariffs. And so the English factory-owners, with nothing to fear, control the markets absolutely and reap exorbitant profits.

Orwell joined the British Independent Labour Party during his time in the Spanish Civil War and became a defender of democratic socialism and a critic of totalitarianism for the rest of his life.

The Spanish Civil War played the most important part in defining Orwell's socialism. He wrote to Cyril Connolly from Barcelona on 8 June 1937: "I have seen wonderful things and at last really believe in Socialism, which I never did before." Having witnessed anarcho-syndicalist communities and the subsequent brutal suppression of the anarcho-syndicalists, anti-Stalin communist parties and revolutionaries by the Soviet Union-backed Communists, Orwell returned from Catalonia a staunch anti-Stalinist and joined the British Independent Labour Party.

In Part 2 of The Road to Wigan Pier, published by the Left Book Club, Orwell stated that "a real Socialist is one who wishes—not merely conceives it as desirable, but actively wishes—to see tyranny overthrown." Orwell stated in "Why I Write" (1946): "Every line of serious work that I have written since 1936 has been written, directly or indirectly, against totalitarianism and for democratic socialism, as I understand it." Orwell's conception of socialism was of a planned economy alongside democracy. Orwell was a proponent of a federal socialist Europe, a position outlined in his 1947 essay "Toward European Unity", which first appeared in Partisan Review. According to biographer John Newsinger:

The other crucial dimension to Orwell's socialism was his recognition that the Soviet Union was not socialist. Unlike many on the left, instead of abandoning socialism once he discovered the full horror of Stalinist rule in the Soviet Union, Orwell abandoned the Soviet Union and instead remained a socialist—indeed he became more committed to the socialist cause than ever.

Orwell was opposed to rearmament against Nazi Germany and at the time of the Munich Agreement signed a manifesto entitled "If War Comes We Shall Resist,"—but he changed his view after the Molotov–Ribbentrop Pact and the outbreak of the war. He left the ILP because of its opposition to the war and adopted a political position of "revolutionary patriotism." On 21 March 1940 Orwell wrote a review of Adolf Hitler's Mein Kampf for The New English Weekly, in which he analysed the dictator's psychology. Asking "how was it that he was able to put [his] monstrous vision across?," Orwell tried to understand why Hitler was worshipped by the German people:

The situation in Germany, with its seven million unemployed, was obviously favourable for demagogues. But Hitler could not have succeeded against his many rivals if it had not been for the attraction of his own personality, which one can feel even in the clumsy writing of Mein Kampf, and which is no doubt overwhelming when one hears his speeches ... The fact is that there is something deeply appealing about him. The initial, personal cause of his grievance against the universe can only be guessed at; but at any rate the grievance is here. He is the martyr, the victim, Prometheus chained to the rock, the self-sacrificing hero who fights single-handed against impossible odds. If he were killing a mouse he would know how to make it seem like a dragon.

In December 1940 he wrote in Tribune, the Labour left's weekly: "We are in a strange period of history in which a revolutionary has to be a patriot and a patriot has to be a revolutionary." During the war, Orwell was highly critical of the popular idea that an Anglo-Soviet alliance would be the basis of a post-war world of peace and prosperity. In his reply, dated 15 November 1945, to an invitation from the Duchess of Atholl to speak for the British League for European Freedom, he stated that he could not "associate himself with an essentially Conservative body" that claimed to "defend democracy in Europe" but had "nothing to say about British imperialism". His closing paragraph stated: "I belong to the Left and must work inside it, much as I hate Russian totalitarianism and its poisonous influence in this country."

Orwell joined the staff of Tribune magazine as literary editor, and from then until his death, was a left-wing (though hardly orthodox) Labour-supporting democratic socialist. On 1 September 1944, writing about the Warsaw Uprising, Orwell expressed in Tribune his hostility against the influence of the alliance with the USSR over the allies: "Do remember that dishonesty and cowardice always have to be paid for. Do not imagine that for years on end you can make yourself the boot-licking propagandist of the sovietic regime, or any other regime, and then suddenly return to honesty and reason. Once a whore, always a whore." According to Newsinger, although Orwell "was always critical of the 1945–51 Labour government's moderation, his support for it began to pull him to the right politically. This did not lead him to embrace conservatism, imperialism or reaction, but to defend, albeit critically, Labour reformism."

Special Branch, the intelligence division of the Metropolitan Police, maintained a file on Orwell for more than 20 years of his life. The dossier, published by The National Archives, states that, according to one investigator, Orwell had "advanced Communist views and several of his Indian friends say that they have often seen him at Communist meetings". MI5, the intelligence department of the Home Office, noted: "It is evident from his recent writings—'The Lion and the Unicorn'—and his contribution to Gollancz's symposium The Betrayal of the Left that he does not hold with the Communist Party nor they with him."

=== Sexuality ===
Sexual politics plays an important role in Nineteen Eighty-Four. In the novel, people's intimate relationships are strictly governed by the party's Junior Anti-Sex League, by opposing sexual relations and instead encouraging artificial insemination. Personally, Orwell disliked what he thought as misguided middle-class revolutionary emancipatory views, expressing disdain for "every fruit-juice drinker, nudist, sandal-wearer, sex-maniacs".

Orwell was also openly against homosexuality. Daphne Patai said: "Of course he was homophobic. That has nothing to do with his relations with his homosexual friends. Certainly, he had a negative attitude and a certain kind of anxiety, a denigrating attitude towards homosexuality. That is definitely the case. I think his writing reflects that quite fully."

Orwell used the homophobic epithets "nancy" and "pansy", for example, in expressions of contempt for what he called the "pansy Left". The protagonist of Keep the Aspidistra Flying, Gordon Comstock, conducts an internal critique of his customers when working in a bookshop, and there is an extended passage of several pages in which he concentrates on a gay male customer, sneering at him for his "nancy" characteristics, including rhotacism. Stephen Spender "thought Orwell's occasional homophobic outbursts were part of his rebellion against the public school".

== Legacy ==
=== Reception and evaluations of Orwell's works ===
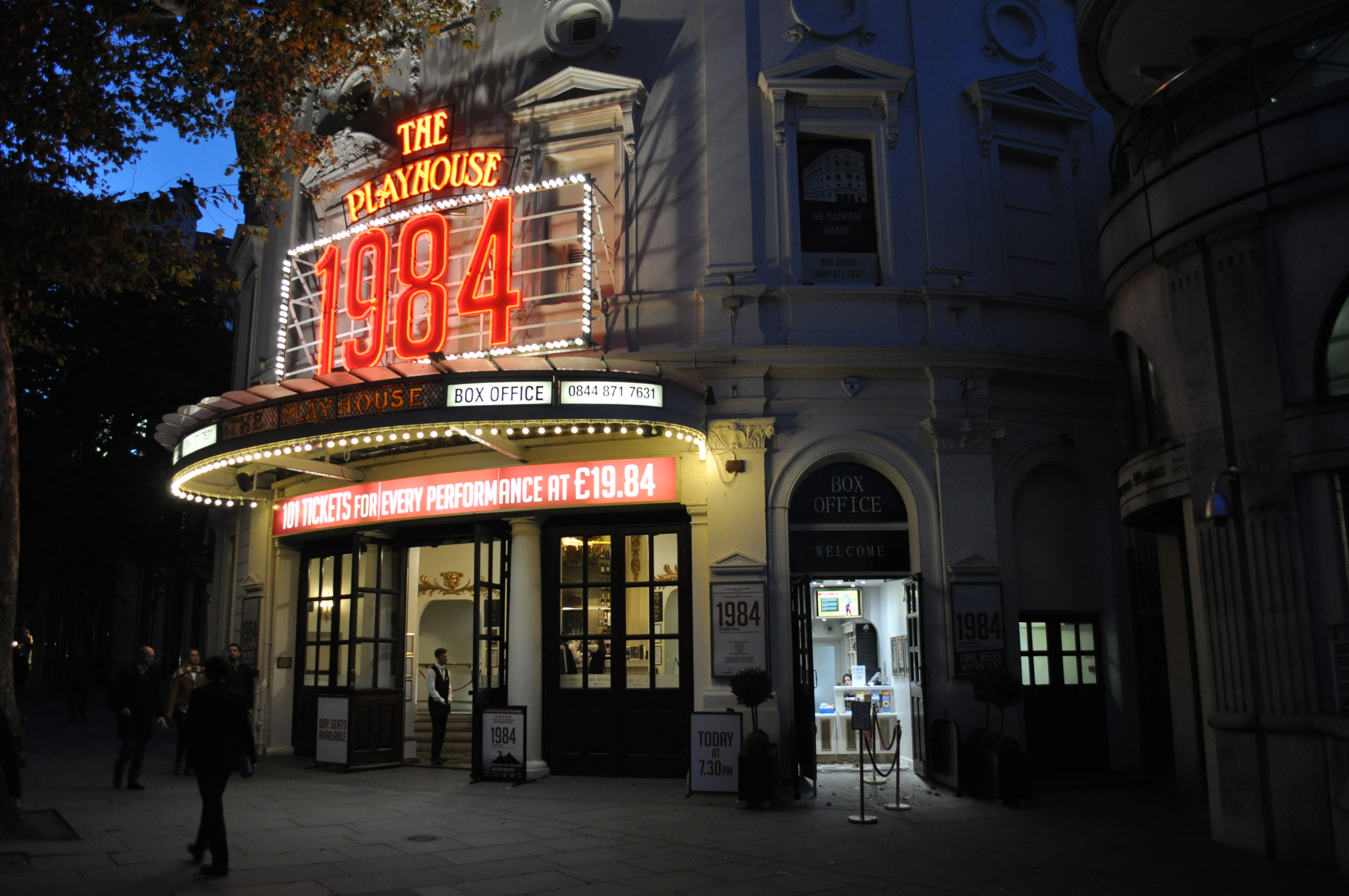
A production of the play 1984 at the Playhouse Theatre in the West End. Orwell's works have been adapted for stage, screen and television. They have also inspired commercials and songs, and he is often quoted. Historian John Rodden called him a "cultural icon".

Arthur Koestler said that Orwell's "uncompromising intellectual honesty made him appear almost inhuman at times". Ben Wattenberg stated: "Orwell's writing pierced intellectual hypocrisy wherever he found it." According to historian Piers Brendon, "Orwell was the saint of common decency who would in earlier days, said his BBC boss Rushbrook Williams, 'have been either canonised—or burnt at the stake'". Raymond Williams in Politics and Letters: Interviews with New Left Review describes Orwell as a "successful impersonation of a plain man who bumps into experience in an unmediated way and tells the truth about it".

Christopher Norris declared that Orwell's "homespun empiricist outlook—his assumption that the truth was just there to be told in a straightforward common-sense way—now seems not merely naïve but culpably self-deluding". The American scholar Scott Lucas has described Orwell as an enemy of the Left. John Newsinger has argued that Lucas could only do this by portraying "all of Orwell's attacks on Stalinism [–] as if they were attacks on socialism, despite Orwell's continued insistence that they were not".

Orwell's work has taken a prominent place in the school literature curriculum in England, with Animal Farm a regular examination topic at the end of secondary education (GCSE), and Nineteen Eighty-Four a topic for subsequent examinations below university level (A Levels). A 2016 UK poll saw Animal Farm ranked the nation's favourite book from school.

The historian John Rodden stated: "John Podhoretz did claim that if Orwell were alive today, he'd be standing with the neo-conservatives and against the Left. And the question arises, to what extent can you even begin to predict the political positions of somebody who's been dead three decades and more by that time?"

Rodden notes the "undeniable conservative features in the Orwell physiognomy" and remarks on how "to some extent Orwell facilitated the kinds of uses and abuses by the Right that his name has been put to. In other ways there has been the politics of selective quotation." Rodden refers to the essay "Why I Write", in which Orwell refers to the Spanish Civil War as being his "watershed political experience", saying: "The Spanish War and other events in 1936–37, turned the scale. Thereafter I knew where I stood. Every line of serious work that I have written since 1936 has been written directly or indirectly against totalitarianism and for democratic socialism as I understand it." (emphasis in original) Rodden goes on to explain how, during the McCarthy era, the introduction to the Signet edition of Animal Farm makes use of selective quotation:

[Introduction]: If the book itself, Animal Farm, had left any doubt of the matter, Orwell dispelled it in his essay Why I Write: "Every line of serious work that I've written since 1936 has been written directly or indirectly against Totalitarianism ...."

[Rodden]: dot, dot, dot, dot, the politics of ellipsis. "For Democratic Socialism" is vaporized, just like Winston Smith did it at the Ministry of Truth, and that's very much what happened at the beginning of the McCarthy era and just continued, Orwell being selectively quoted.

Fyvel wrote about Orwell:

His crucial experience [...] was his struggle to turn himself into a writer, one which led through long periods of poverty, failure and humiliation, and about which he has written almost nothing directly. The sweat and agony was less in the slum-life than in the effort to turn the experience into literature.

Conversely, the historian Isaac Deutscher was far more critical of Orwell from a Marxist perspective and characterised him as a "simple minded anarchist". Deutscher argued that Orwell had struggled to comprehend the dialectical philosophy of Marxism, demonstrated personal ambivalence towards other strands of socialism and his works such as Nineteen Eighty-Four had been appropriated for the purpose of anti-communist Cold War propaganda.

=== Influence on language and writing ===
In his essay "Politics and the English Language" (1946), Orwell wrote about the importance of precise and clear language, arguing that vague writing can be used as a powerful tool of political manipulation. In that essay, Orwell provides six rules for writers:

1. Never use a metaphor, simile or other figure of speech which you are used to seeing in print.
2. Never use a long word where a short one will do.
3. If it is possible to cut a word out, always cut it out.
4. Never use the passive where you can use the active.
5. Never use a foreign phrase, a scientific word or a jargon word if you can think of an everyday English equivalent.
6. Break any of these rules sooner than say anything outright barbarous.

Orwell worked as a journalist at The Observer for seven years, and its editor David Astor gave a copy of this celebrated essay to every new recruit. In 2003, the literary editor at the newspaper Robert McCrum wrote: "Even now, it is quoted in our style book." The journalist Jonathan Heawood noted: "Orwell's criticism of slovenly language is still taken very seriously."

Andrew N. Rubin argues that "Orwell claimed that we should be attentive to how the use of language has limited our capacity for critical thought just as we should be equally concerned with the ways in which dominant modes of thinking have reshaped the very language that we use."

The adjective "Orwellian" connotes an attitude and a policy of control by propaganda, surveillance, misinformation, denial of truth and manipulation of the past. In Nineteen Eighty-Four, Orwell described a totalitarian government that controlled thought by controlling language, making certain ideas literally unthinkable. Several words and phrases from Nineteen Eighty-Four have entered popular language. "Newspeak" is a simplified and obfuscatory language designed to make independent thought impossible.

"Doublethink" means holding two contradictory beliefs simultaneously. The "Thought Police" are those who suppress all dissenting opinion. "Prolefeed" is homogenised, manufactured superficial literature, film and music used to control and indoctrinate the populace through docility. "Big Brother" is a supreme dictator who watches everyone. Other neologisms from the novel include, "Two Minutes Hate", "Room 101", "memory hole", "unperson", and "thoughtcrime", as well as providing direct inspiration for the neologism "groupthink".

Orwell may have been the first to use the term "cold war" in his essay, "You and the Atom Bomb", published in Tribune on 19 October 1945. He wrote:

We may be heading not for general breakdown but for an epoch as horribly stable as the slave empires of antiquity. James Burnham's theory has been much discussed, but few people have yet considered its ideological implications—this is, the kind of world-view, the kind of beliefs, and the social structure that would probably prevail in a State which was at once unconquerable and in a permanent state of "cold war" with its neighbours.

In 1965 the Marxist cultural studies critic Raymond Williams (the author of Keywords) considered Orwell's concept of freedom and his writings in a review of books by Christopher Caudwell, who unlike Orwell (the better known writer) did not survive the Spanish Civil War. Williams cautions the reader "not to rest in Orwell" for "he engages too easily with our intellectual and emotional habits... can reinforce a prejudice, delay recognition of a muddle, betray us emotionally at a point of new growth..."

=== Modern culture ===
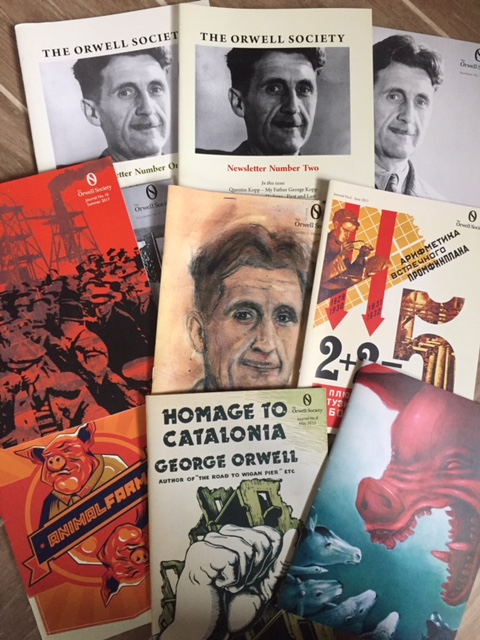
A selection of publications by the Orwell Society

In 2011, The Orwell Society was formed to promote understanding of the life and work of Orwell. Orwell's birthplace, a bungalow in Motihari, Bihar, India, was opened as a museum in May 2015.

Apart from theatre adaptations of his books, several works were written with Orwell as one of the main characters.

- In 2012 a musical play, One Georgie Orwell, by Peter Cordwell and Carl Picton was performed at the Greenwich Theatre, London. It explored Orwell's life, his concerns for the world that he lived in, and for the Britain that he loved.
- In 2014 a play by the playwright Joe Sutton titled Orwell in America was first performed by the Northern Stage theatre company in White River Junction, Vermont. It is a fictitious account of Orwell doing a book tour in the United States (something he never did in his lifetime). It moved to off-Broadway in 2016.
- In 2017 Mrs Orwell by the British playwright Tony Cox opened at the Old Red Lion Theatre in London before transferring to the Southwark Playhouse. The play centres on Orwell's second wife Sonia Brownell (played by Cressida Bonas), her reasons for marrying Orwell and her relationship with Lucian Freud.
- In 2019, Tasmanian theatre company Blue Cow presented the play 101 by Cameron Hindrum, in which Orwell is seen working on Nineteen Eighty-Four "while keeping his severe illness at bay and balancing the demands of fatherhood, art, family and success".
- Orwell is the main character in a 2017 novel The Last Man in Europe by the Australian author Dennis Glover.
- The young Eric Blair is the main character in Paul Theroux's 2024 novel Burma Sahib, a fictional narrative of Blair's five years in the country.

=== Archive ===
In 1960 Orwell's widow Sonia deposited his papers on permanent loan to University College London. The collection contains Orwell's literary notebooks, manuscripts and typescripts of his work, personal and political diaries, correspondence and family material. Since the initial donation the papers – now known as the George Orwell Archive – have been supplemented by further donations from family, friends and business associates. Orwell's son Richard Blair has purchased additional material for the collection since its inception; in 2023 Blair was awarded an Honorary Fellowship from University College London for his contributions.

University College London also holds an extensive collection of Orwell's books, including rare and early editions of his works, translations into other languages and titles from his own library.

=== Statue ===
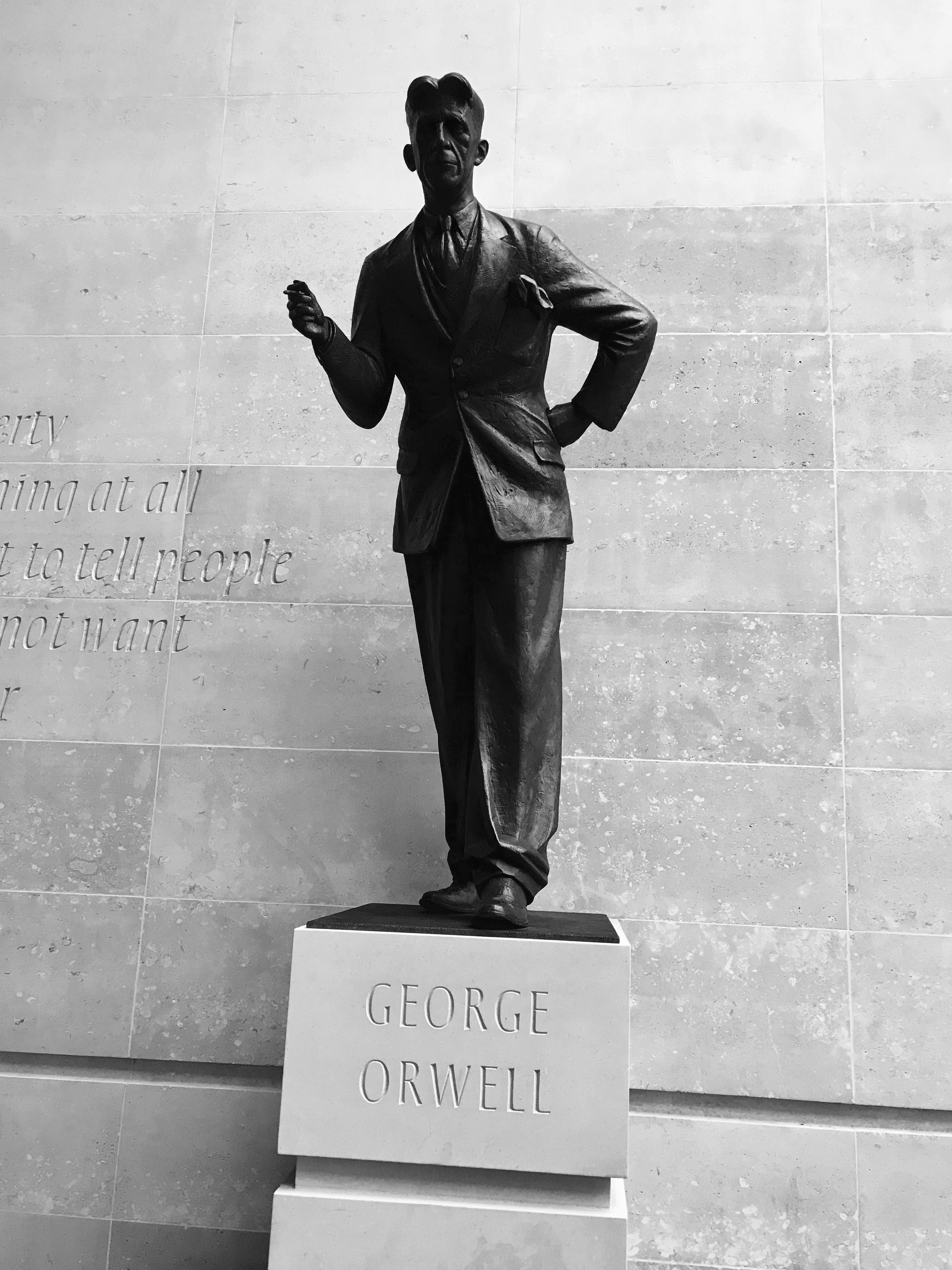
A statue of George Orwell outside Broadcasting House, headquarters of the BBC

A statue of George Orwell, sculpted by the British sculptor Martin Jennings, was unveiled on 7 November 2017 outside Broadcasting House, the headquarters of the BBC. (Note: The statue is owned by The Orwell Society under the patronage of Richard Blair, Orwell's adopted son.) The wall behind the statue is inscribed with the following phrase: "If liberty means anything at all, it means the right to tell people what they do not want to hear". These are words from his proposed preface to Animal Farm and a rallying cry for the idea of free speech in an open society.

=== Other honours ===
In January 2025 the Royal Mint issued a new £2 coin to mark the 75th anniversary of Orwell's death. The design, by Henry Gray, is an allusion to Nineteen Eighty-Four, showing an eye with a camera lens at its centre, and including two quotations from the book.

The Orwell Prize, a British award for political writing, was founded in his honour in 1993 with the aim to "make political writing into an art".

=== Biographies ===
Orwell's will requested that no biography of him be written, and his widow, Sonia Brownell, repelled every attempt by those who tried to persuade her to let them write about him. Various recollections and interpretations were published in the 1950s and 1960s, but Sonia saw the 1968 Collected Works as the record of his life. She did appoint Malcolm Muggeridge as official biographer, but later biographers have seen this as deliberate spoiling as Muggeridge eventually gave up the work. In 1972, two American authors, Peter Stansky and William Abrahams, produced The Unknown Orwell, an unauthorised account of his early years that lacked any support or contribution from Sonia Brownell.

Sonia Brownell then commissioned Bernard Crick to complete a biography and asked Orwell's friends to co-operate. Crick collated a considerable amount of material in his work, which was published in 1980, but his questioning of the factual accuracy of Orwell's first-person writings led to conflict with Brownell, and she tried to suppress the book. Crick concentrated on the facts of Orwell's life rather than his character, and presented primarily a political perspective.

After Sonia Brownell's death, other works on Orwell were published in the 1980s, particularly in 1984. These included collections of reminiscences by Audrey Coppard and Crick and Stephen Wadhams. In 1991, Michael Shelden published a biography. More concerned with the literary nature of Orwell's work, he sought explanations for Orwell's character and treated his first-person writings as autobiographical. Shelden introduced new information that sought to build on Crick's work.

Peter Davison's publication of the Complete Works of George Orwell, completed in 2000, made most of the Orwell Archive accessible to the public. Jeffrey Meyers, a prolific American biographer, was first to take advantage of this and published a book in 2001 that investigated the darker side of Orwell and questioned his saintly image. Why Orwell Matters (released in the UK as Orwell's Victory) was published by Christopher Hitchens in 2002.

In 2003, the centenary of Orwell's birth resulted in biographies by Gordon Bowker and D.J. Taylor. Taylor notes the stage management which surrounds much of Orwell's behaviour and Bowker highlights the essential sense of decency which he considers to have been Orwell's main motivation. An updated edition of Taylor's biography was released in 2023 as Orwell: The New Life, published by Constable.

In 2018, Ronald Binns published the first detailed study of Orwell's years in Suffolk, Orwell in Southwold. In 2020, Richard Bradford wrote a new biography, Orwell: A Man of Our Time, while in 2021 Rebecca Solnit reflected on Orwell's interest in gardening in her book Orwell's Roses.

Two books about Orwell's relationship with his first wife, Eileen O'Shaughnessy, and her role in his life and career, have been published: Eileen: The Making of George Orwell by Sylvia Topp (2020) and Wifedom: Mrs Orwell's Invisible Life by Anna Funder (2023). Funder represents Orwell as misogynistic and sadistic in her book, which sparked a strong controversy among Orwell's biographers, particularly with Topp. Celia Kirwan's family also intervened in the discussion, believing that the attribution to Celia of a relationship with Orwell, was false. Funder agreed to references to Celia being a lover of Orwell and visiting him on Jura, but maintains accounts of "almost innumerable infidelities" during their marriage. Funder later said that she had published facts that had been deliberately hidden, including "his repressed homosexuality, his sadism, his paranoia, his infidelities, his complexity out of which the work comes", and The Orwell Society, which including the couple's adopted son Richard Blair and his friend Quentin Kopp, had objected to this.

== Bibliography ==
=== Novels ===
- 1934 – Burmese Days
- 1935 – A Clergyman's Daughter
- 1936 – Keep the Aspidistra Flying
- 1939 – Coming Up for Air
- 1945 – Animal Farm
- 1949 – Nineteen Eighty-Four

=== Non-fiction ===
- 1933 – Down and Out in Paris and London
- 1937 – The Road to Wigan Pier
- 1938 – Homage to Catalonia

== Sources ==
- Anderson, Paul (ed.). Orwell in Tribune: 'As I Please' and Other Writings. Methuen/Politico's 2006. ISBN 1842751557
- Azurmendi, Joxe (1984). "George Orwell. 1984: Reality exists in the human mind". Jakin, 32: 87–103.
- Bounds, Philip. Orwell and Marxism: The Political and Cultural Thinking of George Orwell. I.B. Tauris. 2009. ISBN 1845118073
- Bowker, Gordon. George Orwell. Little Brown. 2003. ISBN 0316861154
- Buddicom, Jacintha. Eric & Us. Finlay Publisher. 2006. ISBN 0955370809
- Caute, David. Dr. Orwell and Mr. Blair, Weidenfeld & Nicolson. ISBN 0297814389
- Colls, Robert (2013). George Orwell: English Rebel. London: Oxford University Press. p. 217. ISBN 978-0199680801.
- Crick, Bernard. George Orwell: A Life. Penguin. 1982. ISBN 0140058567
- Davison, Peter; Angus, Ian; Davison, Sheila (eds.). 2000 A Kind of Compulsion. London: Random House ISBN 978-0436205422
- Flynn, Nigel. George Orwell. The Rourke Corporation, Inc. 1990. ISBN 086593018X
- Haycock, David Boyd. I Am Spain: The Spanish Civil War and the Men and Women who went to Fight Fascism. Old Street Publishing. 2013. ISBN 978-1908699107
- Hitchens, Christopher. Why Orwell Matters. Basic Books. 2003. ISBN 0465030491
- Hollis, Christopher. A Study of George Orwell: The Man and His Works. Chicago: Henry Regnery Co. 1956.
- Larkin, Emma. Secret Histories: Finding George Orwell in a Burmese Teashop. Penguin. 2005. ISBN 1594200521
- Lee, Robert A. Orwell's Fiction. University of Notre Dame Press, 1969. LCCN 74--75151
- Leif, Ruth Ann. Homage to Oceania. The Prophetic Vision of George Orwell. Ohio State U.P. [1969]
- Meyers, Jeffery. Orwell: Wintry Conscience of a Generation. W.W. Norton. 2000. ISBN 0393322637
- Newsinger, John. Orwell's Politics. Macmillan. 1999. ISBN 0333682874
- Orwell, George, The Collected Essays, Journalism and Letters, vol. 1 – An Age Like This 1945–1950, Penguin.
- Rodden, John (1989). George Orwell: The Politics of Literary Reputation (2002 revised ed.). New York: Oxford University Press. ISBN 978-0765808967.
- Rodden, John (ed.). The Cambridge Companion to George Orwell. Cambridge. 2007. ISBN 978-0521675079
- Shelden, Michael. Orwell: The Authorized Biography. HarperCollins. 1991. ISBN 0060167092
- Smith, D. & Mosher, M. Orwell for Beginners. 1984. London: Writers and Readers Publishing Cooperative.
- Taylor, D.J. Orwell: The Life. Henry Holt and Company. 2003. ISBN 0805074732
- West, W.J. The Larger Evils. Edinburgh: Canongate Press. 1992. ISBN 0862413826 (Nineteen Eighty-Four – The truth behind the satire.)
- West, W.J. (ed.). George Orwell: The Lost Writings. New York: Arbor House. 1984. ISBN 0877957452
- Williams, Raymond. Orwell, Fontana/Collins, 1971
- Wood, James. "A Fine Rage." The New Yorker. 2009. 85(9):54.
- Woodcock, George. The Crystal Spirit: A Study of George Orwell. Little Brown. 1966. ISBN 1551642689
