= Wakeford =

Wakeford is an English surname. Notable people with the surname include:

- Bryan Wakeford (1929–2006), South African cricketer
- Christian Wakeford (born 1984), British MP for Bury South
- Dan Wakeford (born 1975), English-born American Journalist
- Edward Wakeford (1894–1916), English geometer
- Hannah Wakeford, British astrophysicist
- Jim Wakeford (born 1944), well-known medical marijuana advocate based in Toronto, Canada
- John Wakeford (died 1930), Church of England clergyman convicted of adultery and deprived of his post in 1921
- John Wakeford (rugby union) (born 1966), Welsh former rugby union international
- Kent L. Wakeford (1928–2020), American cinematographer, co-founder of two commercial production companies
- Michael Wakeford (born 1937), retired English barrister
- Richard Gordon Wakeford KCB OBE LVO AFC (1922–2007), officer in the Royal Air Force for 36 years, from 1941 to 1977
- Richard Wakeford VC (1921–1972), English recipient of the Victoria Cross during World War II
- Tony Wakeford (born 1959), English folk and neoclassical musician who primarily records under the name Sol Invictus

== See also ==
- Wakeford Nunatak, small nunatak 6 km east of the Central Masson Range in the Framnes Mountains, Mac. Robertson Land
- Jake Ford
- Wake Forest (disambiguation)
- Wesford
- Wexford
