= Borden Grammar School =

Location
- Avenue of Remembrance; Sittingbourne, Kent, ME10 4DB; England; 51.3374°N 0.7348°E

Information
- Type: Grammar school; Academy
- Motto: Nitere Porro (Strive forward)
- Established: 1878; 148 years ago
- Local authority: Kent
- Department for Education URN: 137800 Tables
- Ofsted: Reports
- Headmaster: Ashley Tomlin
- Staff: c.104
- Gender: Boys
- Age: 11 to 18
- Enrolment: 941
- Houses: Twickenham, Wembley, Wimbledon and Lord's
- Colours: Navy blue and gold
- Publication: The Bordenian
- Alumni: Old Bordenians
- Website: https://www.bordengrammar.kent.sch.uk/

Borden Grammar School is a grammar school with academy status in Sittingbourne, Kent, England, which educates boys aged 11–18. A small number of girls have also been admitted to the Sixth Form. The school holds specialist status in sports.

== History ==
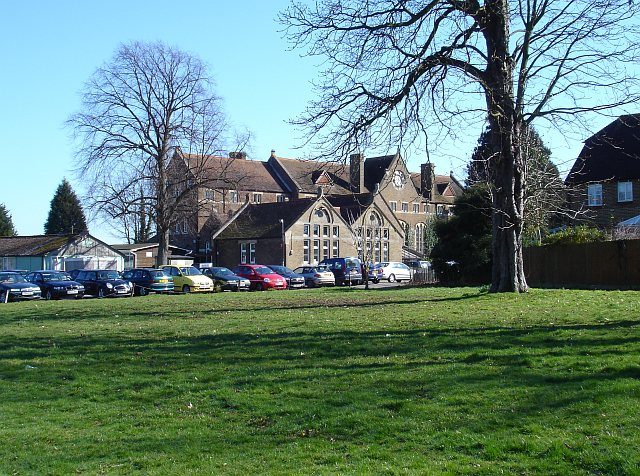
The old Borden Grammar School now Sittingbourne Adult Education College

Plans for a boys' school in Borden began in 1875, as a new way of using some of the accumulated funds from the Barrow Trust, established from the estate of William Barrow (d. 1707), a local farmer, for the benefit of the poorer inhabitants of the village. The trustees of the Barrow Trust became the new school's governors, and they began organising a suitable sum of money to allow the project to go ahead. Within a few years, they had amassed £9,500 and the building of the school began on a seven-acre site in Riddles Road, which belonged to the trust. The Barrow Boys' School, Borden, was to be an independent day and boarding school, designed to have some fifty boarders and some 150 day pupils. The school formally opened in October 1878, with just twenty-three pupils (nine of them from the village of Borden) and one full-time member of staff (the headmaster, Rev. William Henry Bond). A full-time assistant master was recruited in 1880, followed by a second full-time assistant master in 1883.

In 1893, Rev. Bond left to become headmaster of Churcher's College, and was replaced by James Williamson Thurnham, who was keen to increase the number of boarders at the school, which by now was known as Barrow School, Borden. Boarders came from all parts of the country and, indeed, the world, with some hailing from France, Spain, India and Jamaica. Thurnham left to establish New College, Herne Bay in 1906, and took most of the 120 boarders and the majority of the school's staff with him, leaving the next headmaster, William Murdock, with the difficult task of building up numbers once more. Soon after Murdock's appointment, the school began to be referred to as Borden Barrow's Boys' School and was taken into the state education system in 1906. The school now became known as Borden School, a name that had appeared as part of the school badge since at least 1885, but, by 1910, there were six annual scholarships to 'Borden Grammar School', the name by which the school has been known ever since. Up until the 1914, there had still been a few boarders at the school but, after the First World War, it became a day grammar school.

In the early summer of 1929, the school moved to its present site on the Avenue of Remembrance, Sittingbourne, not only because of the rising maintenance costs of the original premises and the fact that it was no longer possible to attract suitable numbers of boys with the school being so far from the centre of Sittingbourne. The new building was formally opened by George, Lord Harris in October 1929, but the school retained its original name despite no longer being located in Borden. The old school building was used for a time as an agricultural college, and is now an Adult Education Centre.

In January 1931, work began on the construction of a cricket pavilion as a memorial to all those Old Bordenians who were killed in the First World War, most of the money being provided by the Old Bordenian Association. The original pavilion was replaced by a modern structure in 2004, which continues to serve as a memorial to all those old boys who were killed in the First World War.

In May 1940, the Government announced that a number of towns on the Southeast Coast were to have their children evacuated: Sheerness was one such town, and some sixty-five pupils from Borden, accompanied by three masters, were evacuated to Pengam, South Wales, where the boys were to attend the Lewis School. Meanwhile, air raid shelters were built on the east side of the school site in Sittingbourne and, later, to the north of the cricket pavilion. In May 1949, a clock tower was unveiled by the Bishop of Dover as a memorial to all those Old Bordenians who lost their lives in the Second World War, the funds once again being provided by the Old Bordenian Association.

The word 'Grammar' was removed from the school's name in 1972, in accordance with a change in the local education system, and there were fears that Borden might be turned into a Sixth Form college. These fears were, however, not realised, and Borden remained a selective school, admitting pupils at thirteen rather than after the 11+ Examination. In 1982, the word 'Grammar' was restored to the school's name, and entry at eleven resumed in 1994.

In 1979, a new teaching block, the Hardy Block (named for the school's fifth headmaster, George Hardy), was opened by Commander John Bostock, DSC, RN, chairman of governors. The first phase of another new teaching block, the Short Block (named for the school's sixth headmaster, Bryan Short), was opened in 1995 and completed in 1998; the finished building was formally opened by Robin, Lord Kingsdown, the great-grandson of the school's first chairman of governors, Sir Edward Leigh Pemberton. One of the science laboratories, the Hooker Advanced Physics Laboratory, was named for and opened by Sir Stanley Hooker, an Old Bordenian and aeronautical engineer. A further substantial teaching, sports and sixth-form block was opened in 2024 and dedicated as the Harold Vafeas Sports and Learning Block in honour of the school's eighth headmaster Harold Vafeas who, despite being taken ill in service, remained as headmaster until months before his passing in January 2014.

The School looks forward to the 150th anniversary of its foundation, and the centenary of relocating to its present site, both in 2028.

== Modern School ==
On 1 September 2006 the school was awarded Specialist status for Sports and Modern Foreign Languages. With this status and an associated increase in funding, the school has built many new facilities, including a multi use games area (MUGA) and the William Barrow Library. In 2011 the school also received a sports bursary, with which it used to construct a climbing wall in the gym.

In 2011, three updated war memorials were installed in the school vestibule, commemorating all those Old Bordenians known to have given their lives in the conflicts of the twentieth century (forty casualties in the First World War, sixty casualties in the Second World War, and single casualties in the Boer War, Korean War and Northern Ireland).

Borden became an academy in 2012, which changed the flexibility of the curriculum able to be taught at the school as well as increased funding.

The school, along with other Sittingbourne-based secondary schools, Fulston Manor School and Highsted Grammar School for Girls, maintain a close community and share teaching responsibilities of specialised subjects at A-Level, with Borden teaching Economics and Psychology.

== School badge, motto and song ==
The school's badge, which in heraldic terms is blazoned as 'azure, a chevron or between three crescents of the last', is believed to have been derived from the coat of arms of William Barrow; however, no proof of this connection has been uncovered, despite extensive efforts in the 1930s. Some sources fancifully state that the three crescents represent successive generations of pupils at the school, but the badge was in use as early as 1885, when the school was still in its infancy. The gold border that surrounds the shield is believed to have been added when a navy blazer became part of the school uniform, so that the blue field of the shield would stand out.

The school has a Latin motto, 'Nitere Porro', which translates as 'Strive Forward'. Adopted during the headmastership of William Claydon, it was taken from a speech by Julius Caesar quoted in Horace's Epistles.

'Forty Years On' was also adopted as the school song under William Claydon. This replaced an earlier school song, which began with the words 'Borden, you merit all our praise, Our home through countless happy days.'

== Houses ==
In common with many secondary schools in England, Borden has long had a house system. At the time of the First World War, the houses were 'Blue', 'Buff' and 'Red'. These were later replaced with 'Barrow', 'Borden' and 'School', to which 'Swale' was added in the 1930s. Aside from the references to the school's location and benefactor, the etymology of 'Swale' can be explained by reference to the local stretch of water, The Swale, which runs between Sittingbourne and the Isle of Sheppey and also lends its name to the local Borough Council.

This house system was brought to an end by headmaster Stephen Wright in 2002.

The house system was reinstated at the start of the school year beginning September 2007, under Harold Vafeas. The new house names are Lord's, Wimbledon, Wembley and Twickenham, named after the homes of cricket, tennis, football and rugby in England; ironically, the school predates the namesakes of two of its houses, Wembley and Twickenham.

With the loss of Barrow House, there is no longer any reference to the school's founding benefactor, William Barrow.

== Old Bordenian Association ==
The Old Bordenian Association (OBA) is a charitable association, open to all former pupils and staff of Borden Grammar School.

The OBA was established in 1912 and re-established in 1925, following a period of abeyance during the First World War. The Association's badge is similar to the School badge, but with three crescents on a maroon rather than blue background.

The Association supports the School financially by funding extra-curricular enrichment, and practically with the skillset of its membership. In recent years, the OBA has provided a minibus for the School, and contributed toward the costs of refurbishing the school's Barrow Library and the foundation of a well-being garden, in addition to offering career mentoring to current pupils and recent leavers.

The OBA has long honoured the memory of the School's military casualties. In 1931, a brick-and-timber sports pavilion was constructed and dedicated to the fallen Old Bordenians of the First World War; this was replaced by a modern brick building, which was rededicated in 2004. The School's clock tower was unveiled in 1949, and commemorates the fallen Old Bordenians of the Second World War. In 2011, the OBA funded two war memorials that record the names of all those Old Bordenians who fell in armed conflict in the Twentieth Century. Since then, wooden plaques have been placed over the entrances to individual classrooms within the School and commemorate the names of the Old Bordenians killed in the First World War. The OBA formerly held a Remembrance Service on the Saturday closest to Remembrance Sunday, honouring all those Old Bordenians who have lost their lives in the armed conflicts of the Twentieth Century. Since 2020, the OBA has joined with the school to hold a combined Remembrance Service on the school day closest to Armistice Day.

The Association's annual journal, The Maroon, was first published in 1937 and replaced by a website, the eMaroon in 2009. The origin of the name ‘Maroon’ is unclear: the first edition of the magazine suggests that it might have been derived from a signal rocket of that name, used to summon crew or assistance, or simply from the colour that was already in use by the Association.

The OBA holds an annual reunion dinner each spring, held inside the Old Hall. The OBA maintains the Old Bordenian Football Club and retains a strong association with the Sittingbourne Hockey Club (formerly the Old Bordenian Hockey Club), which has a clubhouse and pitch onsite.

== Cadet Corps ==
The school's first cadet corps was formed in 1903, affiliated to 4th Volunteer Battalion, The Queen's Own (Royal West Kent Regiment) and commanded by one of the masters. The Cadet Corps was removed from the Army List in 1906, following the transfer of the headmaster, James Thurnham, and most of the school's staff and boarders, to New College, Herne Bay. It was then revived in 1917, this time affiliated to 4th The Buffs (East Kent Regiment) and commanded by the then headmaster, William Murdock. It appears to have been finally wound up by the time the school moved to the Avenue of Remembrance in 1928.

== Headmasters ==
- 1878-1893: (15 years service) Rev. William Henry Bond, MA (Cantab.) – Left to become headmaster of Churcher's College.
- 1893-1906: (13 years service) James Williamson Thurnham, MA (Cantab.) – Left to become headmaster of New College, Herne Bay.
- 1906-1936: (30 years service) William Murdock, MA (Oxon.), BSc (London) – retired.
- 1936-1941: (5 years service) William Arthur Claydon, MA (Oxon.) – Left to become headmaster of Maidstone Grammar School. Appointed CBE, 1956.
- 1941-1968: (27 years service) George Ernest Hardy, BSc (Hons.) (Birmingham) – retired. Appointed OBE, 1969.
- 1968-1998: (30 years service) Bryan Richard Short, MA (Oxon.) – retired.
- 1998-2004: (6 years service) Stephen Neill Wright, MA (Cantab.) – Left to become headmaster of Merchant Taylors' School, Northwood.
- 2004-2013: (9 years service) Harold Sofronios Vafeas, MA (Cantab.) – retired.
- 2013-2019: (6 years service) Jonathan R[?]. Hopkins, BA (Hons.) (unknown university), NPQH – Left to become headmaster of Barton Court Grammar School, Canterbury.
- 2020–present: Ashley Tomlin, BSc (Hons.) (Kent), NPQH

== Notable former pupils ==
- Lloyd Amsdon, Matthew Bowling and Stuart Hennell, founders of Watchfinder
- Francis Baker, CBE, Governor of St. Helena, 1984–88; chief secretary to the Government of the Falkland Islands, 1979–84 (including the Argentine invasion of 1982)
- Pedro Barrié de la Maza, 1 Conde de Fenosa, Gran Cruz del Mérito Naval con Distintivo Blanco, Gran Cruz de la Orden del Mérito Civil, Gran Cruz de la Orden de Isabel la Católica, Gran Cruz de la Orden Civil de Beneficencia, Medalla de Oro al Mérito en el Trabajo, Spanish banker, businessman and founder of the Fundación Barrié
- Geoff Beynon, trade union leader
- James Bostock, RE, ARCA, painter and engraver
- Steve Brown, Paralympian
- Peter Butler, FRS, FInstP, physicist
- Frank Cassell, CB, UK Executive Director of the IMF and World Bank, 1988-90
- Roger Chapman, professional golfer
- Brigadier John Clemow, late Royal Artillery, director of guided weapons projects, Ministry of Supply
- Trevor Dadson, FBA, Encomienda del Orden de Isabel la Católica, Emeritus Professor of Hispanic Studies, Queen Mary University of London
- Admiral Sir Kenneth Eaton, GBE, KCB, Rear-Admiral of the United Kingdom, 2001–07, and Third Sea Lord, 1989–94
- Roy Finlay, founder of Phyllis Court
- Brigadier Ernest Goode, CBE, late Royal Army Service Corps, attached Sudan Defence Force, 1935–43; ADC to The Queen, 1959-62
- John Hale, Oscar-nominated and Golden Globe-winning screenwriter, whose work includes Anne of the Thousand Days and Mary, Queen of Scots
- Major William Hayward, farmer and political figure in British Columbia
- Simon Honey, known as Ben Dover, pornographic actor and director
- Sir Stanley Hooker, CBE, FRS, FRAeS, aeronautical engineer who designed the early jet engines, culminating with the Rolls-Royce Pegasus
- Adrian Howells, performance artist
- Kevin Keohane, CBE, Professor of Science, Chelsea College of Science and Technology 1967-76; rector, Roehampton Institute of Higher Education, 1976-88
- Sir Alexander King, 6th Baronet of Charlestown, Co. Roscommon
- Sir Peter Kitcatt, CB, intelligence officer and secretary to the Speaker of the House of Commons, 1986-93
- Air Vice-Marshal Ronald Knott, CB, DSO, DFC, AFC and Bar, RAF, Station Commander of RAF Gütersloh, 1959–61
- Jason Lee, field hockey coach and former international player
- Commodore Douglas Littlejohns, CBE, RN, submarine commander, adviser to Tom Clancy's Red Storm Rising and former CEO of Red Storm Entertainment
- Colonel Brian Luck, CMG, DSO, late Royal Artillery, Commander Royal Artillery Gibraltar, 1925-26
- Hon. Brigadier-General Cyril Montagu Luck, CMG, DSO, late Royal Engineers, director-general of Inland Water Transport, France, 1917-19
- Sean McGinty, professional footballer
- Peter Millican, philosopher
- Brigadier Noel Muddiman, CBE, late Royal Corps of Transport, Commander Transport and Movements, First Gulf War; former director of Motability
- Alan Odle, illustrator
- José Domingo de Osma y Cortés, VII Conde de Vistaflorida, Spanish aristocrat
- Sir Alfred Road, CBE, Chief Inspector of Taxes, Inland Revenue, 1952-56
- Nicholas Sims-Williams, FBA, Emeritus Professor of Iranian and Central Asian Studies, SOAS
- Patrick Sims-Williams, FBA, Emeritus Professor of Celtic Studies, Aberystwyth University
- Michael Smith, author
- Air Vice-Marshal Tony Stables, CBE, FRAeS, RAF, Commandant, RAF Cranwell (1994–1997); Chief Executive, Training Group Defence Agency; Commander, KFOR Rear
- Squadron Leader Ray Thilthorpe, RAF, manager of the Red Arrows, 1978–1982;
- Nicholas Vincent, FBA, FRHistS, FSA, professor of Medieval History, University of East Anglia
- Edward Wakeford, geometer
- Sir Cecil Wakeley, 1st Baronet of Liss, KBE, CB, FRCS, president of the Royal College of Surgeons of England, 1949–54; Surgeon Rear-Admiral, Royal Navy
- Erasmus Willson, first-class cricketer
- George Zucco, character actor

== Notable former staff ==
- Robert Ladds (ex-Chemistry staff), Bishop of Whitby, 1999-2008

== Notable people associated with Borden Grammar School ==
- Sir Edward Leigh Pemberton, KCB, JP, DL, first chair of governors
