= Dione Venables =

English female novelist and publisher (1930–2023)

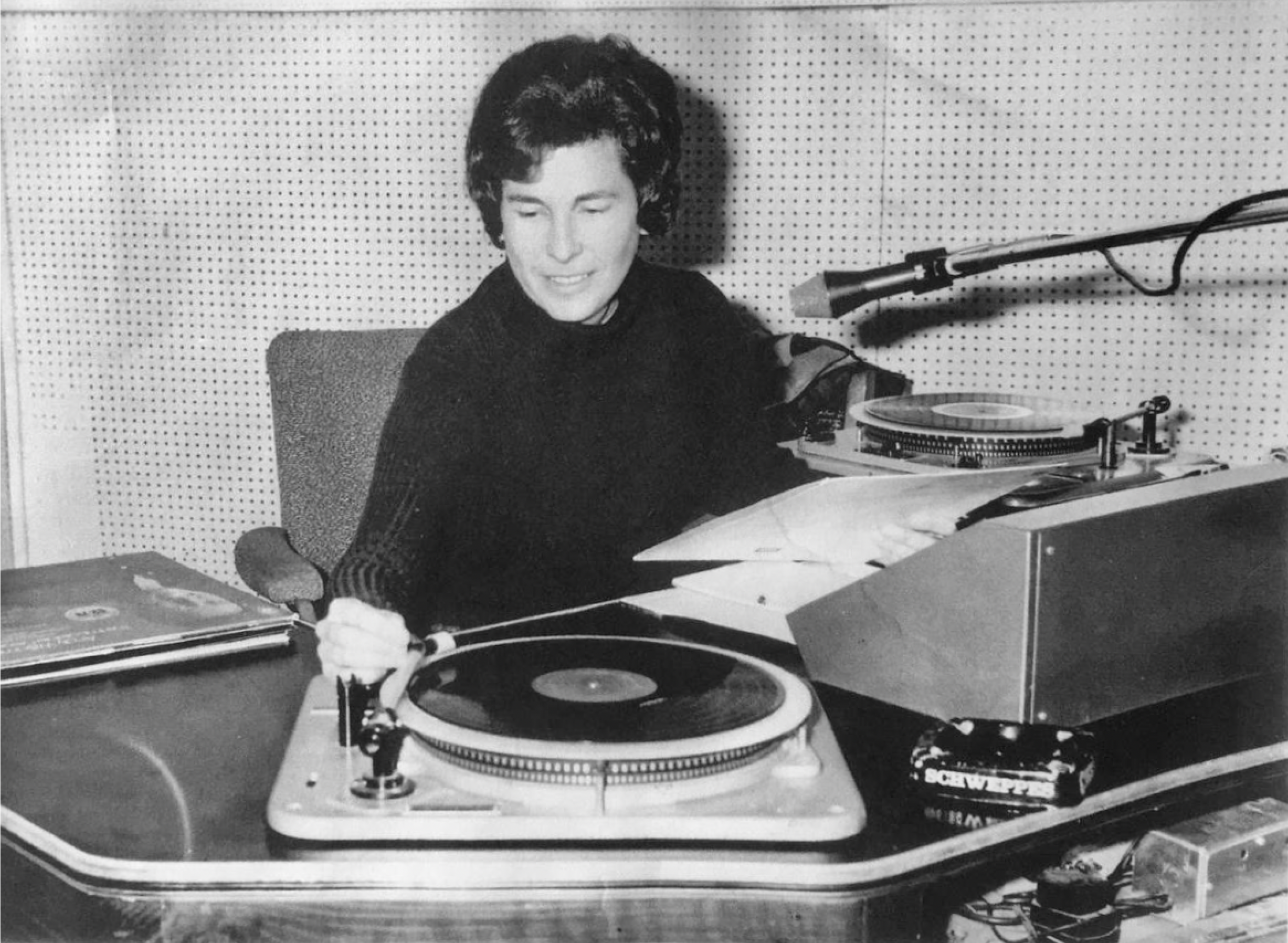
- Dione Venables, BFBS Malta, circa 1972
- Born: Dione Patricia Mary Gordon-Finlay; 20 October 1930; Great Missenden, Buckinghamshire, England
- Died: 12 September 2023 (aged 92)
- Occupations: Novelist, publisher
- Spouse: Geoffrey FD Loftus (m. 1949; div. 1964) John R Venables (m. 1964; died 1996)
- Children: 4
- Parent(s): Alan Gordon Finlay; Florence Gallagher
- Writing career
- Pen name: DG Finlay

Dione Patricia Mary Venables (née Gordon-Finlay; 20 October 1930 – 12 September 2023), pen name D.G. Finlay, was an English novelist and publisher, remembered as the founder of The Orwell Society.

== Early life ==
Dione Patricia Mary Gordon-Finlay was born prematurely in the Prestwood Hotel at Great Missenden, England on 20 October 1930 as the second daughter of Florence (née Gallagher) and engineer-inventor Alan Gordon-Finlay. The family had just returned from living in Switzerland, where her father had co-created the Filene-Finlay simultaneous interpretation system at the League of Nations in Geneva.

Venables' childhood was dominated by life at St. Leonards-Mayfield School where she boarded from the age of three until the outbreak of World War II at ten years old. The Blitz forced many urban families to re-evaluate where their children lived, and prompted various mass evacuations of children. Venables and her sister June were hastily booked on a passage to Montreal aboard the SS City of Benares to live with their aunt in Canada. Days before they were due to leave, their father had a change of heart, resolving instead to keep the family together at their home in Kensington.

A few days later, the Benares was torpedoed and sank, taking with it their luggage and the lives of seventy-seven children. A few weeks after that, their Kensington home was destroyed in a bombing raid while the family sheltered in nearby South Kensington tube station. With nowhere to live and all of her belongings destroyed, Venables was sent away from the bombing to live with another aunt, Laura Buddicom (née Finlay), in Shiplake, where she was to remain for eighteen months with her older cousins Jacintha Buddicom and Guinever.

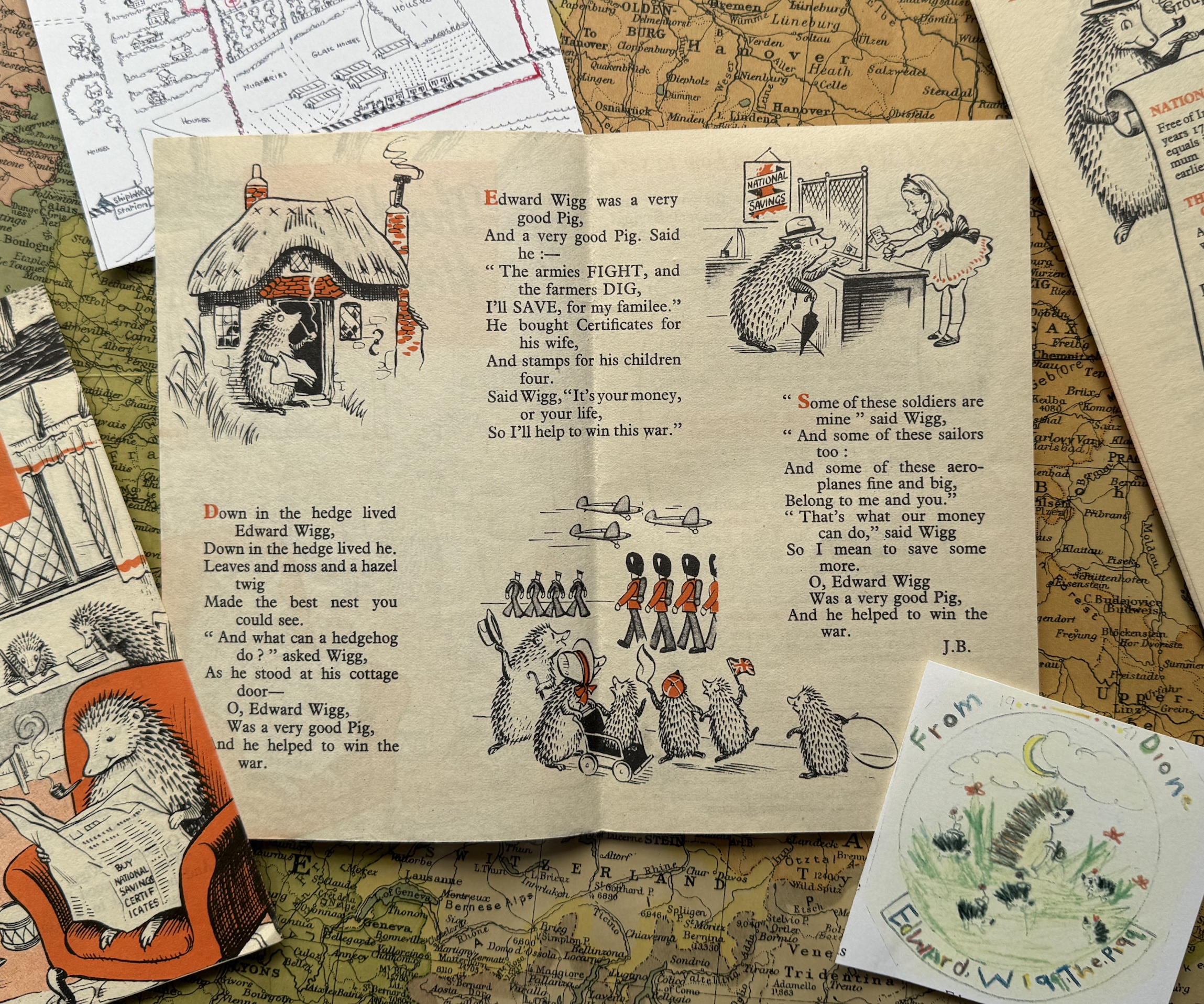
Poem about Edward Wigg based on drawings and story created by the young Dione Venables in 1941

While living with the Buddicoms, Venables developed a friendship with Arthur Ransome, who encouraged her to write. Her first attempt at writing, aged 11, featured a hedgehog called Edward Wigg, who was adapted by Jacintha in support of the War Effort as part of the National Savings Movement.

By 1944, Venables had relocated to Beckenham, as the streets filled with assorted military vehicles preparing for D-Day. On 15 June, the three-storey house where she and her mother were living collapsed on top of them after a V-1 flying bomb exploded in their garden. Venables remained buried under rubble with her mother for several hours until they were discovered by rescuers and slowly released using a collapsed Morrison shelter as an escape tunnel.

Following a number of weeks in Beckenham General Hospital, mother and daughter were transferred to a flat in Thornton Hall to convalesce within a few miles of Bletchley Park where her father and sister were working. (Note: reportedly, Bletchley staff had been billeted at Thornton Hall) Still recovering from her injuries, Venables attended school at the nearby Thornton College, where she met Heather Loftus, the sister of her future husband.

== Postwar ==
After war had ended in 1945, Alan and Florence Gordon-Finlay returned to their pre-war home in Switzerland, leaving Venables a semi-permanent guest at Tingewick Hall, the family home of her schoolfriend Heather. It was at Tingewick that Venables became a young adult, learning to ride horses, drive, fly a Gypsy Moth, (Note: Ferrars Loftus owned a recreational Gypsy Moth, in which Dione logged over 500 pilot hours after the War) and to enjoy music. (Note: Dione had wanted to have a singing career and attended the Royal Central School of Speech and Drama but her mother (a devout Catholic) pulled her out when she discovered that the girls shared changing rooms with the boys) Venables and Geoffrey Loftus became inseparable over this period and in 1949, they married.

Between 1951 and 1956, Venables raised two daughters and a son. Within a decade, her marriage was failing and in 1959, she joined Overseas Aviation as an air hostess participating in sometimes dangerous humanitarian aid flights operating out of London Southend Airport. (Note: Entrepreneurial post-war charter aviation companies often used war surplus short range propeller driven aircraft, some of which were borderline airworthy) On one such flight to Entebbe, Venables was reportedly captured by rebel soldiers under the command of Colonel Mobutu, when their aircraft stopped in Léopoldville for refuelling.

In 1960, Venables followed Freddie Laker by transferring to British United Airways for the next four years. In addition to scheduled routes to Southeast Asia, the airline was chartered by the British Government for troop flights to East Africa during the unrest that flared up as Kenya, Tanganyika and Uganda transitioned to independence from Britain. She later began to work other scheduled flights, flying to the USA and Southeast Asia.

It was on regular flights to Singapore that she met and, in 1964, married Lt Cdr John Venables (RN).

== Writing career ==
Venables wrote short articles for newspapers and magazines, giving eye-witness accounts of her experiences across Africa and around the world. She started married life with John Venables by publishing more memories of her experiences in the Middle East and Pakistan, while providing relief flights for refugees in wartorn states. Being a naval officer's wife did not come easily to Venables at first, and it was not long before the couple got an assignment back to Singapore, where their adopted daughter was born in 1968.

Venables returned to writing in 1970, preparing scripts for radio documentary programming as a trainee presenter and interviewer, whilst living in Malta. Returning to England, her emerging broadcasting career of four years was cut short abruptly by a car accident in 1975, leading her to use a wheelchair for less than a year. (Note: Dione was in training with the BBC at Radio Solent but was unable to continue after the accident. That ended her radio ambitions until 2014, when she began hosting a nostalgia programme on Angel Radio called "Heart & Soul") During this time, Venables took to researching the history of her neighbourhood at her local library in Gosport, (Note: Some of Venables' research at this time was filed with the Gosport library) which led to her writing her first historical novel Once Around the Sun in 1976, with the sequel forthcoming in 1978. After a number of years living between Malta and England, Venables finally settled near to Chichester, where she researched her next series of novels.

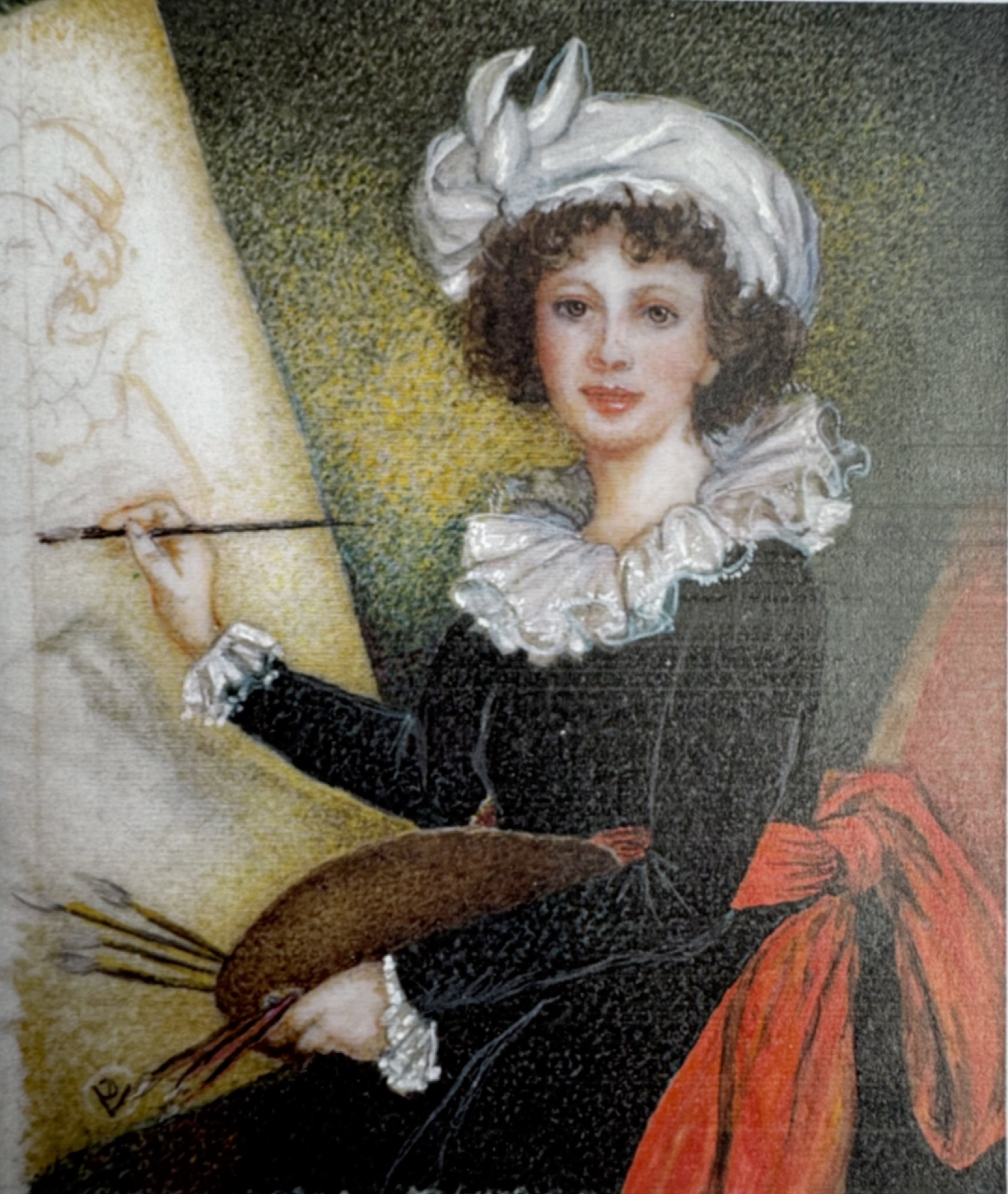
Self-portrait after Elisabeth Vigée Lebrun painted as a miniature by Dione Venables 2003 (Note: Exhibited and sold for an undisclosed sum at the Smithsonian in 2004)

A few years later, John Venables retired and the couple took on a pub in Oxfordshire while Venables' next novel Watchman was published. By 1986, they once again moved to Chiswick, where the sequel to Watchman was released.

In the same year, Venables turned to publishing, creating an independent audiobook company called Sound Beam at a time of expansion in the industry, which rapidly squeezed her out of the market the following year. At the same time, her two last novels in the Watchman series were published. Following three difficult years as publican, publisher and author, Venables returned with her husband John to the Chichester District in 1988. When John died in 1996, Venables turned to painting as a miniaturist and was quickly involved in local and national limner organizations, (Note: The Society of Limners and the Hiliard Society) exhibiting and selling paintings from Chichester to New York.

== George Orwell ==
Venables' two cousins, sisters Guinever and Jacintha Buddicom, had moved to Bournemouth, close to where Venables lived, and were elderly when she returned in 1988. She visited them twice a week to do shopping and help them out in the house and garden, discussing their childhood memories of George Orwell. Jacintha had withdrawn from public discourse about George Orwell not long after publication of her memoir Eric & Us in 1974. Venables solicited information from the two sisters between 1982 and 2002, which she noted in her diaries. (Note: Jacintha Buddicom's account of the young George Orwell was the only primary source outside of his school days in existence. Dione believed it was important to preserve the authenticity and integrity of Jacintha's memories, so she had excerpts from her diary notarised and properly archived for future reference) When Jacintha and Guinever died in 1993 and 2003 respectively, the Buddicom sisters left their photographs and the copyright of Eric & Us to Venables in the expectation that as a writer, she would rejuvenate the memoir in some way.

In 2006, Venables created Finlay Publisher as a vehicle to publish and distribute online successive print runs of a newly indexed version of Eric & Us. She was encouraged by Gordon Bowker to include a postscript in the autumn, based on a series of previously unpublished diaries, letters and documented interviews. At the same time, Venables developed Orwell Direct online to encourage and to moderate discussion between academics and enthusiasts interested in promoting the life and works of George Orwell. In 2008, the site began publishing a series of twenty articles submitted by scholars who had written at length about Orwell. Contributors included Sir Bernard Crick, Gordon Bowker, John Rodden, Liam Hunt, DJ Taylor, Douglas Kerr, Peter Davison, and Orwell's son, Richard Blair.

A number of regulars active on Orwell Direct encouraged Venables to institute a more formal collective of Orwell enthusiasts. The proposal was severely contested and became controversial due to the fact that Venables, who was selling the idea, had no literary or academic background. Despite some resistance, in December 2010, Venables proposed The Orwell Society at an informal meeting at Phyllis Court, (Note: Orwell had been an occasional guest of the Buddicoms at Phyllis Court, which was owned at the time by Dione's uncle, Roy Finlay) which became formally inaugurated in April 2011. In 2015, she compiled and published a collection of Orwell's poetry, which she donated to The Orwell Society.

Having taken on the role of Membership Secretary to The Orwell Society in 2011, Venables stepped down from any formal role in 2016 at the age of eighty-six. She continued working to preserve the memory of George Orwell through guest appearances on television and radio, as well as through The Orwell Society Annual General Meetings.

== Legacy ==
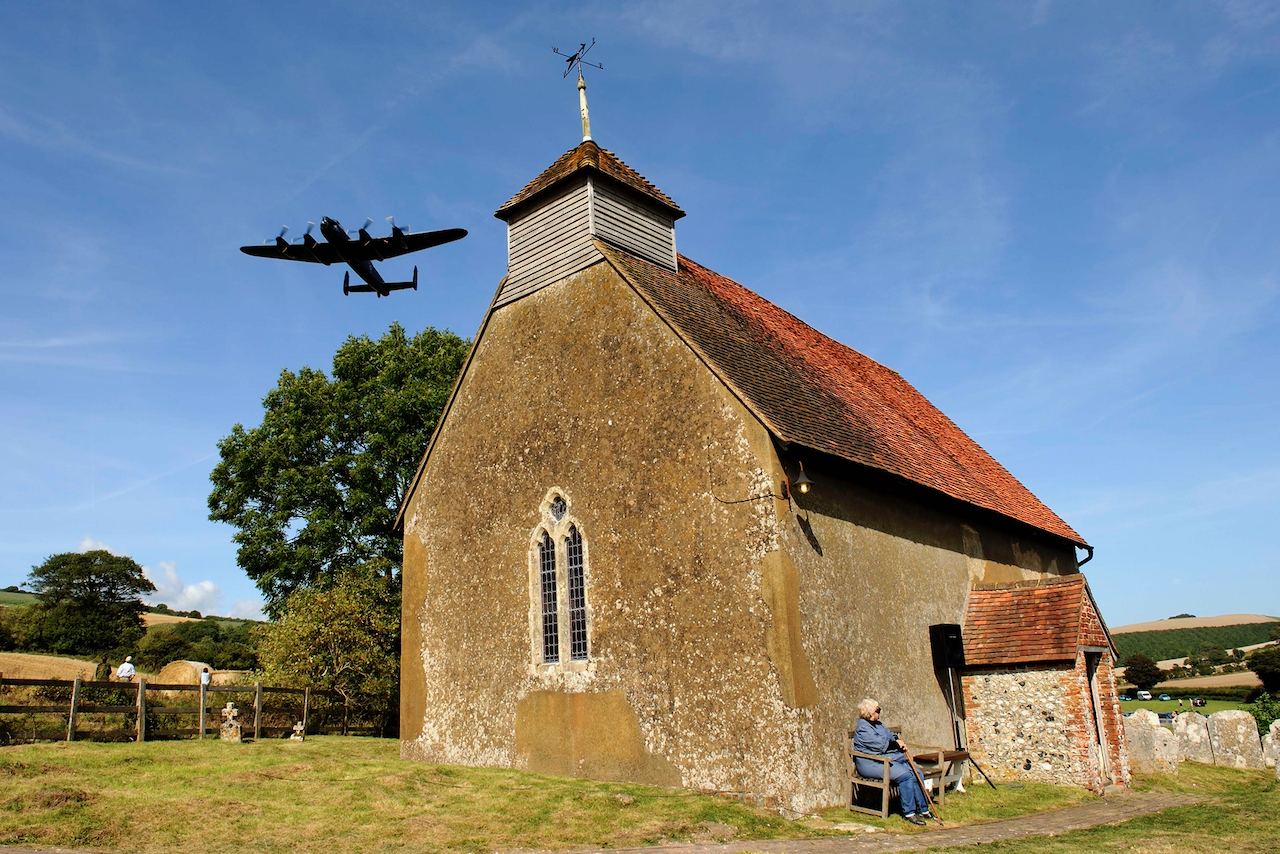
Upwaltham memorial, 2009

In 2003, Venables started work on creating a memorial to commemorate the loss of fifteen airmen from Australia, America, Britain and Canada who crashed in two separate incidents in the South Downs overlooking Upwaltham. The memorial was unveiled in 2009 by dignitaries and family members, and included a rare flypast of a World War Two Lancaster Bomber in honour of the airmen.

Venables died on 12 September 2023, at the age of 92. She leaves a legacy of ten books, dozens of articles and scores of paintings, as well as her role in preserving the life and works of George Orwell.

== Selected works ==
=== Fiction ===
- 1978 – Once Around the Sun
- 1979 – The Edge of Tomorrow
- 1984 – Watchman
- 1986 – The Grey Regard
- 1987 – Deadly Relations
- 1987 – Graven Image
- 1989 – The Killing Glance

=== Non-fiction ===
- 2006 – Postscript to Eric & Us
- 2015 – Anthology George Orwell - The Complete Poetry
- 2016 - Author and co-narrator George Orwell - The Complete Poetry Audible podcast, featuring Dione Venables and Greg Wise.
- 2017 – Author Dione's War
- 2025 - Author War Child
