= Roy Finlay =

Founder and creator of the exclusive Phyllis Court Club

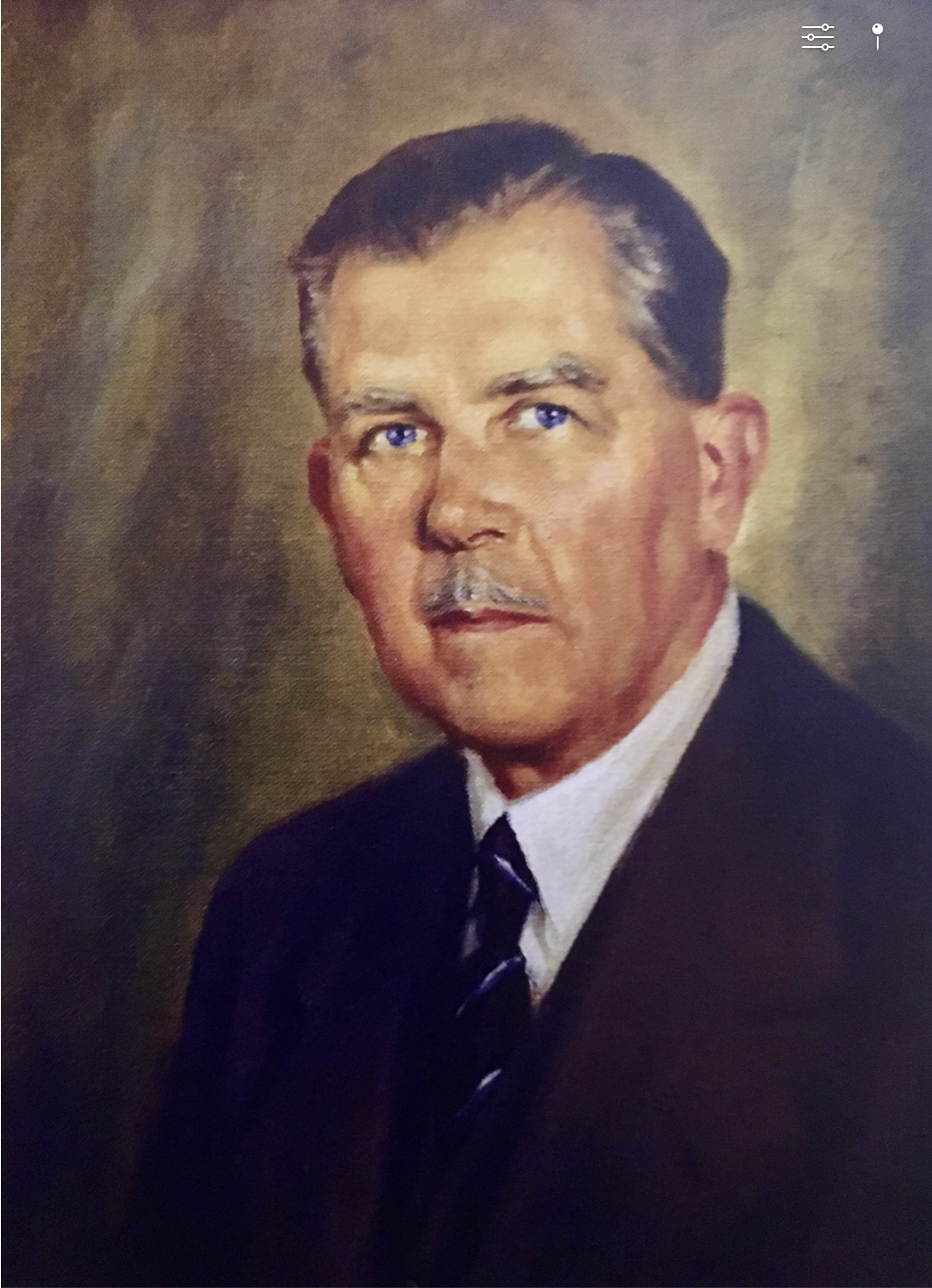
- Roy Finlay, circa 1947 on Display at the Phyllis Court Club
- Born: Reginald Gedye Finlay; 19 November 1881; Woollahra, New South Wales, Australia
- Died: 20 February 1952 (aged 70); Shiplake, Henley
- Occupations: Founder, Phyllis Court Club
- Children: One (adopted) son

Roy Finlay (19 November 1881 – 20 February 1952) was born in Australia of Scottish descent and is best known for dedicating his life towards creating and sustaining the Phyllis Court Club and its emerging role in the Henley Royal Regatta from 1906 to 1937.

== Life and works ==
Reginald Gedye Finlay was born in Woollahra in 1881, the elder son of Reginald Edmund Alexander Finlay and Laura Mary Gedye. At the age of 14, Finlay emigrated with the rest of the family to live with their grandfather in London. The following year, Finlay was sent to Borden Grammar School in Kent to complete his education, where he remained for two years until 1898. In 1901, the Finlays purchased a portion of the Bolney Estate in Shiplake, where they constructed five residential houses, laying part of the estate over to fruit farming with orchards and glass-houses. Finlay moved into one of the houses (Trevone) but the life of a fruit farmer was not to be for him.

=== Phyllis Court Club ===
In 1905, Finlay noticed a "To Let" hoarding on the river bank at Phyllis Court, a substantial mansion that enclosed a significant length of the shore of the River Thames adjacent to the finish line of the Henley Royal Regatta. He persuaded his father to underwrite the purchase of a lease on the property and to establish the creation of a sporting club, which Finlay would manage in his father's name. The family agreed to the plan and on 7 June 1905 a celebration was held and the club was born. Over the next few years, Finlay devoted his life to refurbishing the house to make Phyllis Court stand out as a venue for the week of the Henley Regatta and to establish it as part of the London Season. Landowners, society courtiers, military officers and racing-men flocked to the club, with applications greatly exceeding the allocation of places, which said as much about the personal charm and charisma of Finlay as it did about his business sense and attention to detail. The promise of strong returns encouraged Finlay to offer debentures for members to underwrite enlarging the business whilst taking much of the running of the Club upon himself, aged just 23. A Founder's Committee was installed to improve governance by giving some control back to members, and in 1907, a full-time secretary was appointed.

The robustness of the new governance structure was put to the test in 1910 when Finlay became gravely ill from typhoid, putting him out of action for the entire summer season. With Finlay absent, the committee made key changes to the club's revenue stream reducing the club to the brink of bankruptcy. Finlay slowly recovered his health in October and took immediate corrective action, sacking the secretary and inviting the entire committee to resign before dissolving it. He spent the next three years successfully tackling the huge debt, managing creditors, recovering the damaged reputation of the Club and, reclaiming his own health as well as restoring the Club back to profit.

=== First World War ===
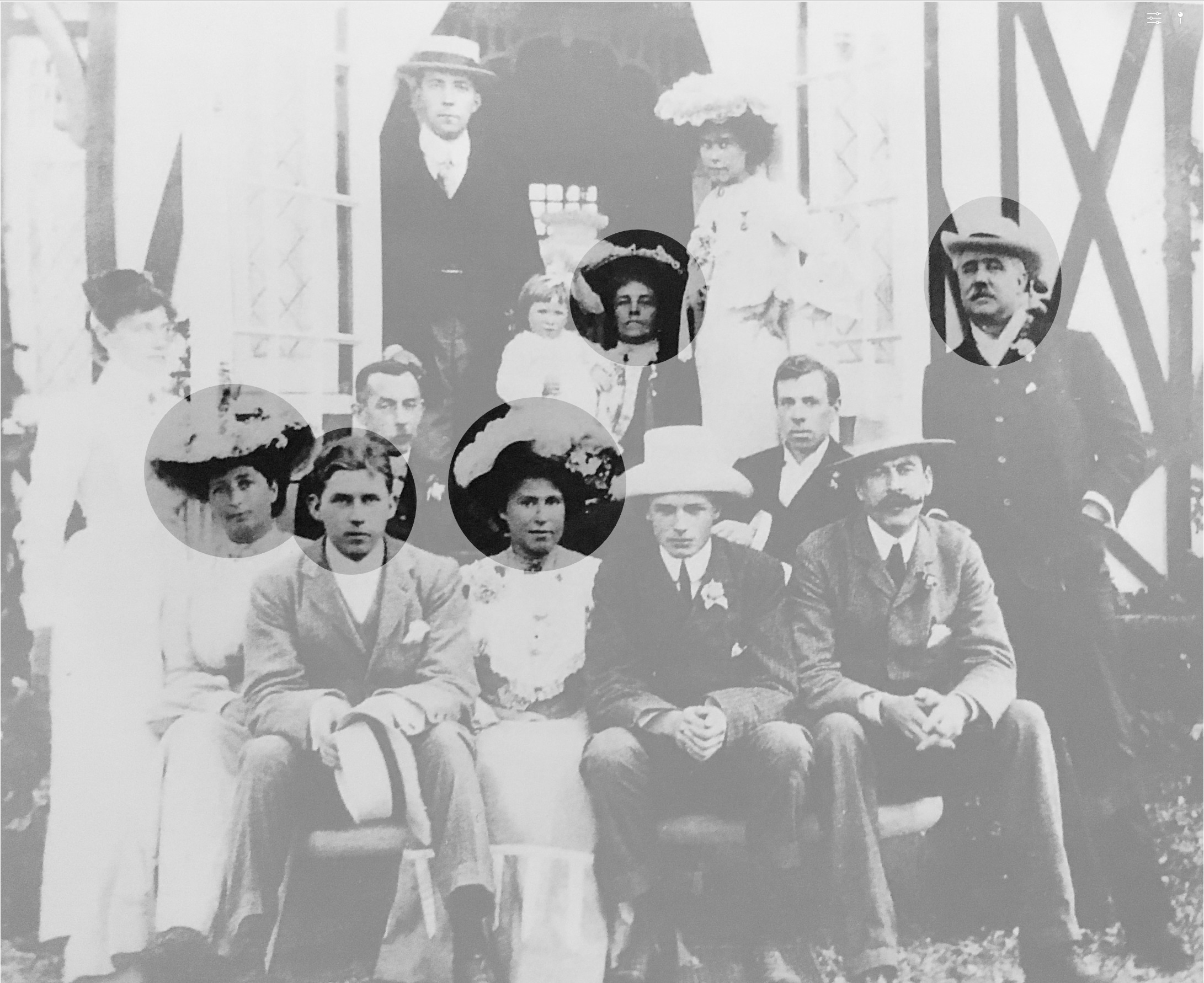
Courtesy of Dione Venables showing Roy Finlay bottom left flanked by sisters (left) Mimi and (right) Laura, with father Reginald standing right and mother (Laura) sitting top centre at Trevone, 1903

Finlay had been attending Army camp for two weeks every year as a reservist for the King's Colonials since 1903. In 1911, the regiment became King Edward's Horse and in 1913, Finlay was placed on the reserve's list and received orders to hold himself in readiness in August 1914. The Phyllis Court Club was only eight years old when Finlay was compelled to wind down activities, handing over the day-to-day running of the Club in 1914 to the care of his sister Mimi Burke in Shiplake (photograph right) and a skeleton administrative staff at Henley composed mostly of women. In November, Finlay was assigned to the Western Front and, ill-prepared as he was for action, he adapted fast. By January 1915, he was held back behind the lines as a cavalry officer, training for a long-awaited big assault. There was talk of the Regiment being transferred to Egypt, which Finlay favoured over a promotion in Kitchener's Army in the trenches, but it wasn't long before he joined his brother Alan back in the trenches at Ypres.

Such was Finlay's devotion to Phyllis Court that he managed the Club remotely throughout the war. In 1916, he returned to England ferrying fresh troops across the channel to France in a series of "torpedo runs" and in 1917, when the Regiment disbanded, transferred to the General Staff in Norfolk as a temporary captain in the 1st Mounted Division of the Norfolk home guard, making it much easier for him to direct affairs at Henley. In 1918, however, he returned to the Front working with intelligence in support of Edmund Ironside attached to Kitchener's Army as part of the 11th Battalion of the Essex Regiment. Finlay's concerns about joining Kitchener's Army were realised when on 14 September during the Hundred Days Offensive on the Hindenberg Line, burnt from a gas shell explosion and suffering from chlorine inhalation as well as temporary blindness, he was transferred back to England to see out the rest of the War recovering from his injuries. He continued to conduct meetings for the administration of Phyllis Court from his hospital bed until he was released from hospital and the Armistice was signed. Finlay was able to return to Henley the following month.

=== Between the Wars ===
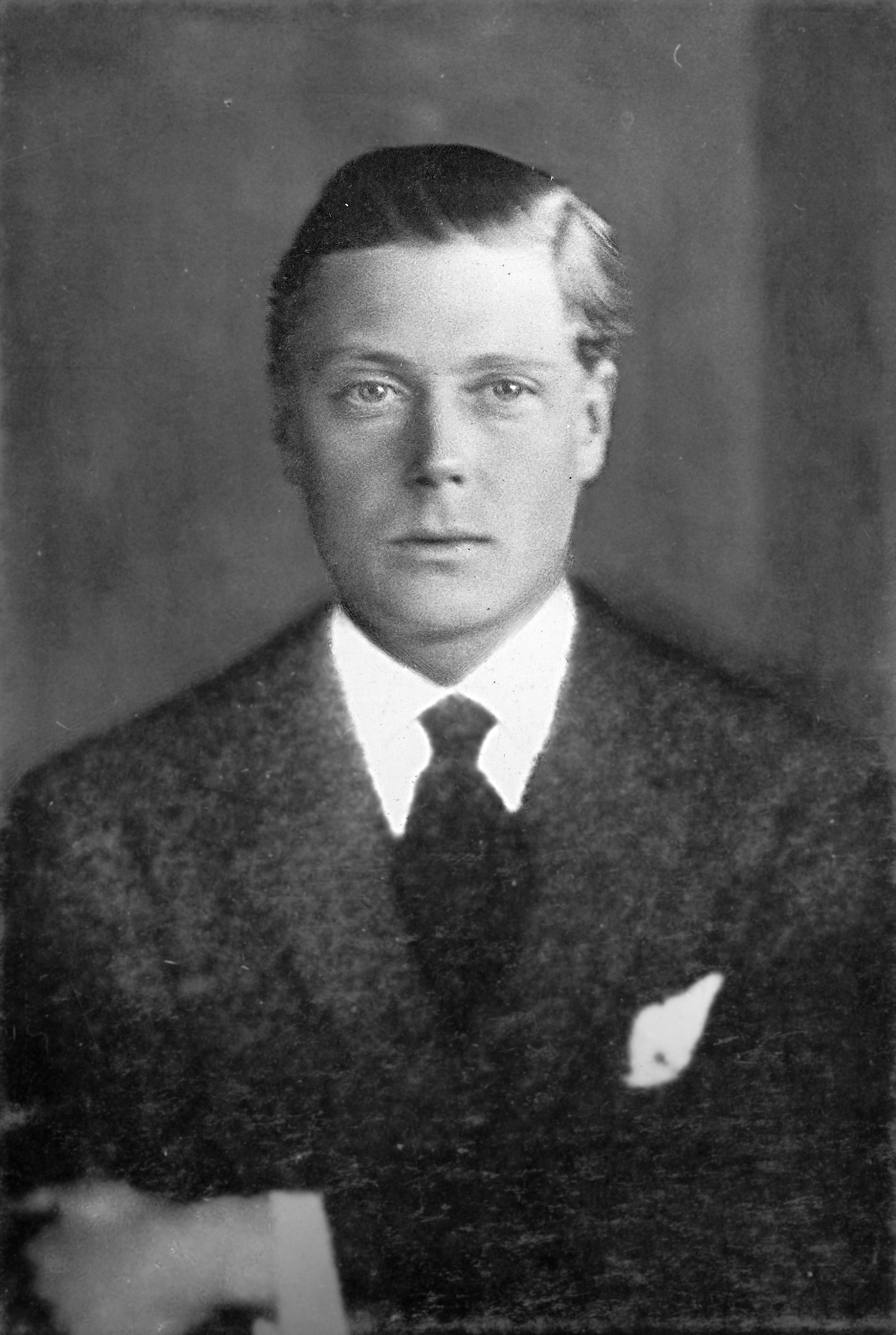
HRH the Prince of Wales, circa 1924

By January 1919, Finlay reconstituted a General Committee at Phyllis Court replacing the former Founder's Committee, installing himself as managing director and secretary of the club. Mindful of the horrors of the previous four years, Finlay tentatively launched the new season in May 1919. To his surprise, the austerity of war had been replaced by a wave of pre-war nostalgia: for the Henley Royal Regatta, with Phyllis Court once again centre-stage. By July, 400 new members had signed up creating excellent cash-flow over the summer, which convinced Finlay to renew the leases for a further twenty-one years. Finlay launched Phyllis Court in the 1920s as a sports club, with a busy sporting calendar of International Tennis tournaments as well as restoring the Henley Royal Regatta to an athletic rowing event. But the club is best remembered for exemplifying the social context of the Roaring Twenties, the Jazz Age with parties, balls, music, dining but above all – dancing.

"There will be dances at Phyllis Court after lunch, dances between races, dances after tea, dances after dinner, and a great Gala ball on Saturday night".

Phyllis Court catered for the elitist hedonism of an age, ceding the athletic integrity of the Regatta to the stewards, who had been banished to an enclosure on the opposite bank to Phyllis Court. This inevitably led to a rivalry between sporting and social activities around Henley Week, which permeates the Regatta today. Finlay had captured the mood of the age by placing the emphasis on social entertainment to the point of irreverence but he always maintained its elitist exclusivity, drawing on the London Season to ensure that the Club didn't only depend on Henley Week for revenue. In 1924, the socially popular Prince of Wales accepted the role of patron to the club, which guaranteed continued society membership, as "the most exclusive river-side club in the world". But Finlay did not exclude those like himself who had served their country at the front as well as service clubs around the colonies, placing his own rank as the minimum entry qualification.

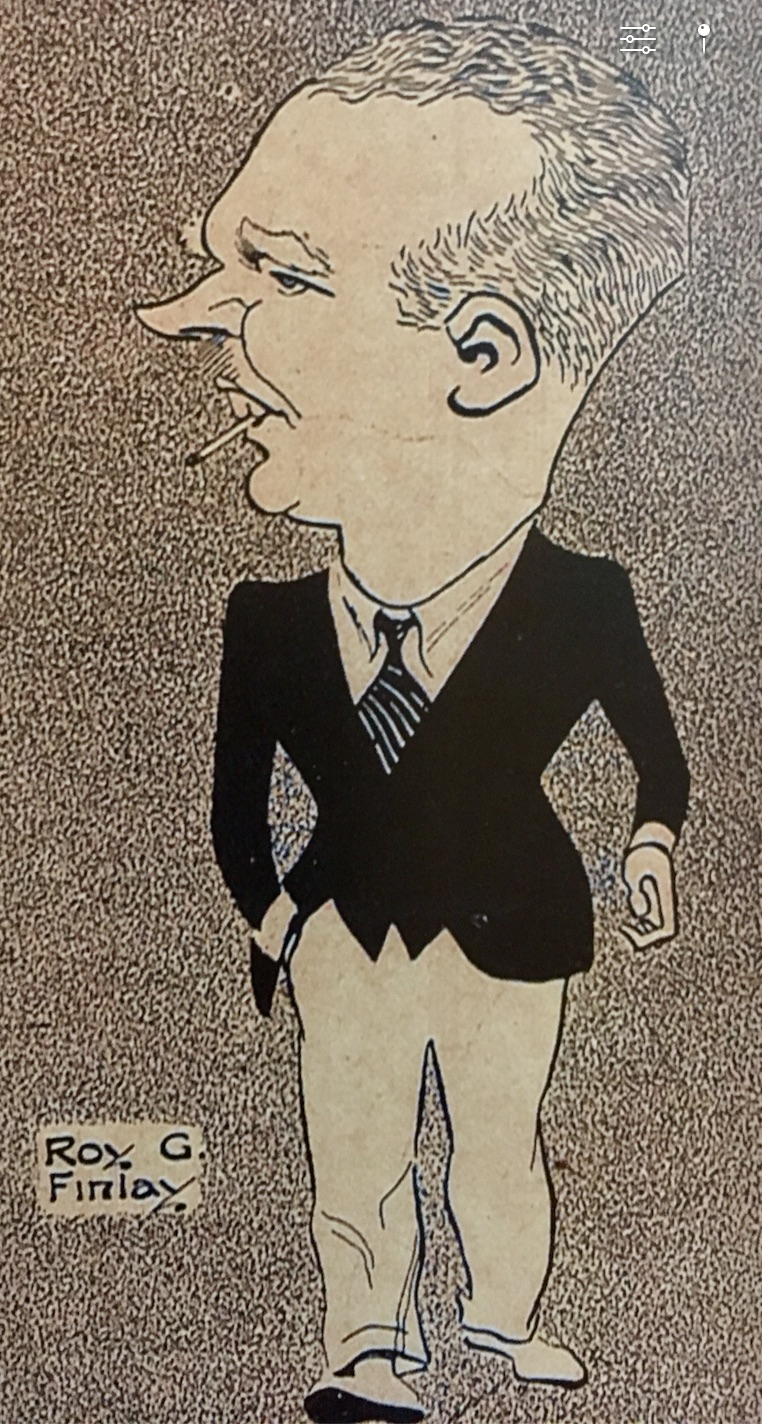
Roy Finlay Caricature 1920s

The Club had become so successful that Finlay was able to buy the freehold to Phyllis Court in 1929, which he celebrated by granting, with typical generosity, a 50-year lease of the property to the members. Shortly afterwards, the Wall Street crash halted any further development to buildings but the club's activities did not slow down, as "Phyllis" had become as much of a national institution as any of the Royal fixtures.

== Legacy ==
Finlay took steps to ensure the financial security of the club during the depression. In 1933, he stepped down as managing director and honorary secretary of the Club in favour of his adopted son, Jack Rendle-Mervill and three years later, Finlay proposed selling Phyllis Court to its members, prompting the Henley Standard to write "To people of this neighbourhood who have known Phyllis Court under the suzerainty of Captain Roy Finlay ever since they can remember anything at all, the change will come rather as the passing of a milestone." The Phyllis Court Club transitioned from a proprietary club to a member's club in 1937.

Finlay moved out of Phyllis Court for the last time in 1937, returning to his former home, Trevone, in Shiplake, which he had significantly expanded and renamed Bolney Trevor, where he remained through the Second World War. Finlay's last substantial offering to the club was to underwrite the cost of transfer to a members club, which gave him lingering voting rights. Finlay's devotion to the Club showed in every detail of his involvement in creating the club and fronting its development. The Club bought out all of Finlay's voting rights in 1946 removing any control he had on its further development. Captain Roy Finlay died aged 70 at his home on 20 February 1952. In his last will and testament, Roy asked that his "ashes be strewn over the lawns of Phyllis Court".

== Bibliography ==
Jason Tomes – 2012, "Phyllis Court – Club and Manor", published by Phyllis Court Members Club Ltd, 2012, ISBN 978-0-9573229-0-5
