= 2nd Regiment of Horse =

2nd Regiment of Horse or 2nd Horse may refer to:

- 1st King's Dragoon Guards, ranked as 2nd Horse from 1685 to 1746
- 5th Dragoon Guards, ranked as 2nd (Irish) Horse from 1746 to 1788
- 2nd King Edward's Horse, active 1914 to 1917
