= Canadian Cavalry Brigade =

Brigade of the Canadian Army

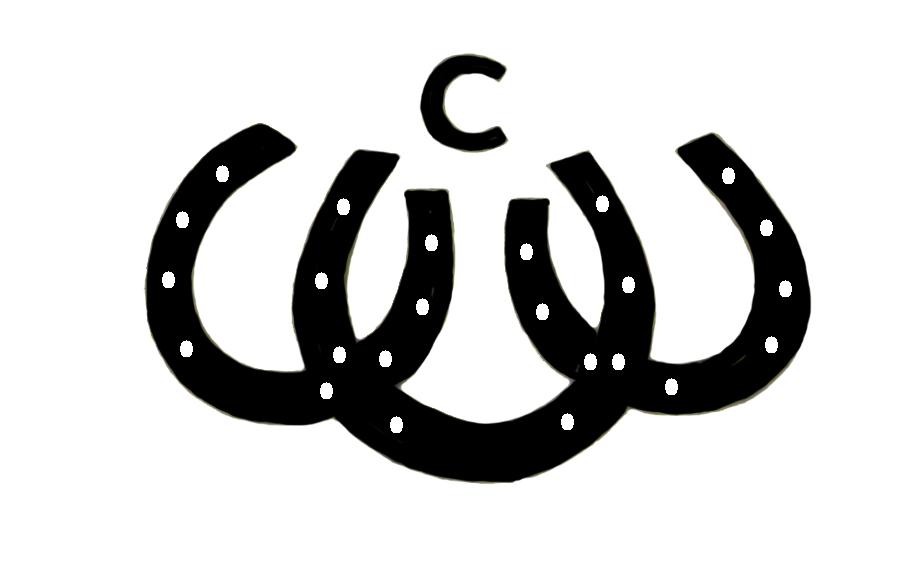
- Logo of the Canadian Cavalry Brigade as painted in Currie Hall, Royal Military College, Kingston, Ontario, Canada
- Active: 1914–1918
- Country: Canada
- Branch: Canadian Expeditionary Force
- Type: Cavalry
- Size: 1 artillery and 3 cavalry regiments
- Part of: 5th Cavalry Division
- Engagements: Battle of Festubert; Battle of the Somme; Battle of Cambrai (1917), Battle of Amiens; Second Battle of the Somme (1918); Battle of Cambrai (1918); Hundred Days Offensive

Commanders
- Notable commanders: J.E.B. Seely

The Canadian Cavalry Brigade was raised in December 1914, under its first commanding officer Brigadier-General J.E.B. Seely. It was originally composed of two Canadian and one British regiments and an attached artillery battery. The Canadian units were the Royal Canadian Dragoons, Lord Strathcona's Horse (Royal Canadians) and the Royal Canadian Horse Artillery battery. The British regiment was the 2nd King Edward's Horse (The King's Overseas Dominions Regiment). 2KEH was replaced by The Fort Garry Horse in February 1916.

== History ==
The brigade's units arrived in England in 1914, then left as a dismounted formation for France in April 1915. The brigade arrived in France during the Battle of Festubert and then served in the trenches during the Battle of Givenchy. The brigade remained serving as infantry until the end of January 1916, when it was re-formed as a cavalry force. It became part of the 2nd Indian Cavalry Division (later 5th Cavalry Division) in the British Cavalry Corps.

It was held in reserve during the Battle of the Somme, its first mounted operation being during the German retreat to the Hindenberg Line. In the final days of the war the brigade, finally able to get into open ground, cleared nine French villages, captured around 400 enemy, with several artillery pieces and about 100 machine guns.

The painter Alfred Munnings was assigned as a war artist to the brigade and produced numerous paintings of the unit's men and horses.

== Formation ==
Commanders
Brigadier-General J.E.B Seely: December 1914 – May 1918
Brigadier-General R.W. Paterson: from May 1918
Units
Royal Canadian Dragoons
Lord Strathcona's Horse (Royal Canadians)
2nd King Edward's Horse (The King's Overseas Dominions Regiment) later replaced by
The Fort Garry Horse
Royal Canadian Horse Artillery

== Notable members ==
- Lieutenant Harcus Strachan, VC, MC
- Lieutenant Frederick Maurice Watson Harvey, VC, CBE, MC
- Lieutenant Gordon Flowerdew, VC
