= Alan Gordon-Finlay =

British engineer (1890–1959)

Alan Gordon-Finlay MC
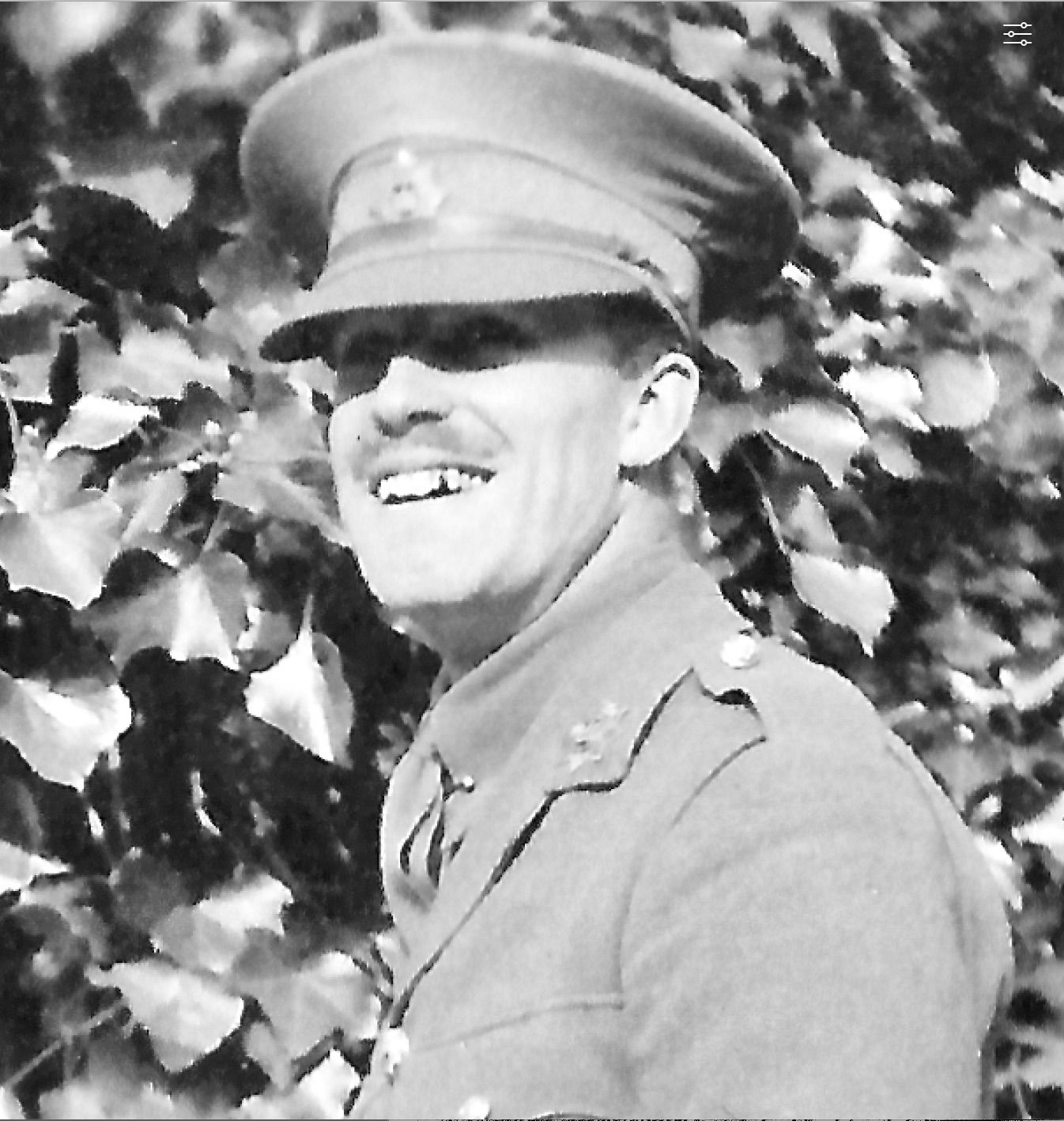
- Finlay in the uniform of King Edward's Horse, circa 1914
- Born: Alan Gordon-Finlay; 8 June 1890; Turramurra, Australia
- Died: 6 June 1959 (aged 68); Uckfield, England
- Resting place: St. Dunstan's Church, Mayfield
- Citizenship: British
- Education: Lausanne University
- Known for: Simultaneous Interpretation System
- Spouse: Florence Mary Gallagher
- Children: June and Dione
- Scientific career
- Fields: Electrical engineering, Simultaneous Interpretation

Alan Gordon-Finlay (8 June 1890 – 6 June 1959) was a British engineer and inventor of Scottish descent born in Australia. He is best known for having co-created the Filene-Finlay (incorrectly spelled Findlay) simultaneous interpretation system at the League of Nations in Geneva after the First World War, the first of its kind and the fore-runner to modern interpretation systems in use throughout the world today. A patent was purchased by IBM in 1930, taking it to global production.

== Early life ==
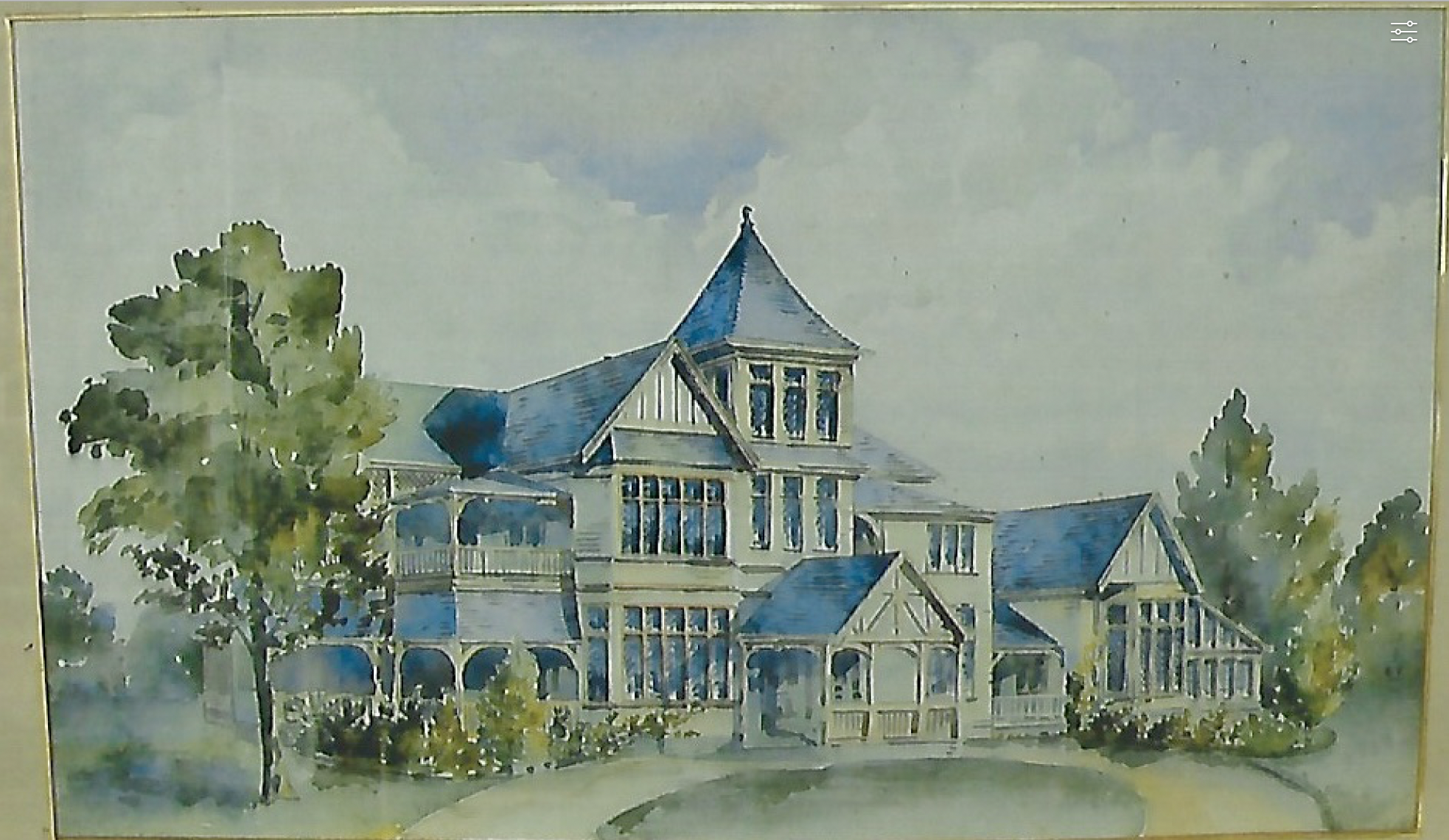
Blytheswood, Turramurra. The old house has been replaced by residential streets named after members of the family

Alan Gordon-Finlay was born on 8 June 1890 at Blytheswood in Turramurra in Sydney, Australia. In 1896, the family moved to London, where Finlay attended a number of private schools to nurture a young prodigious talent. In 1898, at the age of 8, Finlay announced that he would like to be an inventor and to earn money by publishing patents. He then proved his point by presenting his first patent: an electrical device for lighting a gas flame. Two years later, Finlay contracted meningitis and stayed with his Aunt (Adeline Finlay) in Geneva, to take advantage of its healthier air. He remained in his aunt's care in Switzerland for the rest of his formative years, learning both French and German fluently and attending Lausanne University in 1906/07, before attending an English boarding school in Montreux from January 1908 – 1911.

With his formal education over, Finlay wanted to fly aeroplanes, no doubt encouraged by his life-long friend Philip Joubert. After his father had died in 1906, Finlay's future was set by his mother, who determined that he would never fly. A reticent Finlay entered the Royal Military College at Sandhurst in England in 1910. Though exemplary in conduct, he never responded well to authority and was distracted, narrowly graduating in 1911. Finlay was awarded a commission with the Gordon Highlanders and was transferred to Delhi initially, serving as a second lieutenant along the Northwest Frontier with Afghanistan. By 1913, he is missing from the Army Lists and may have returned to England having decided to change his career by entering the Diplomatic Service.

== First World War ==
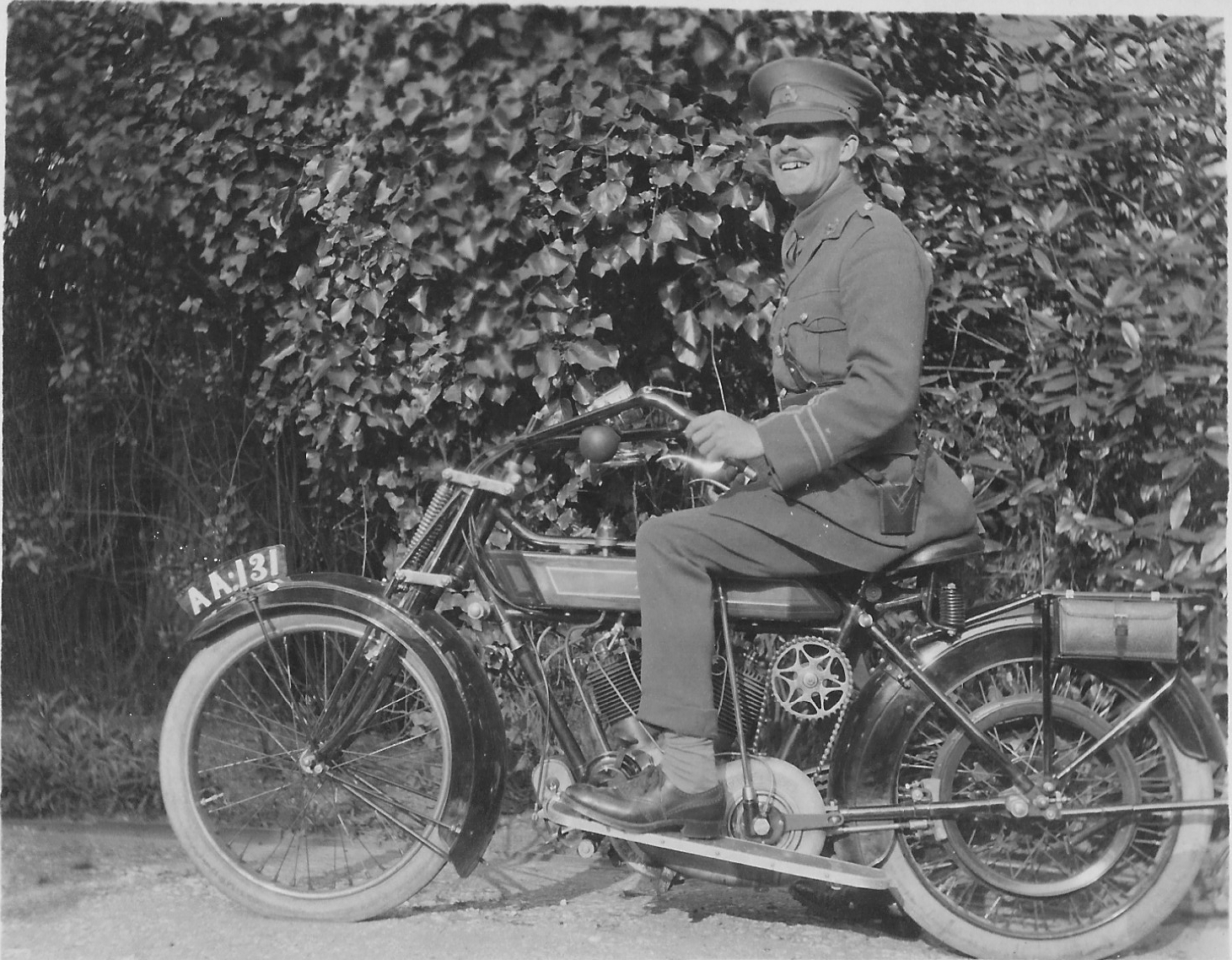
Alan Gordon-Finlay circa 1914, back from the front astride his Royal Enfield motorcycle

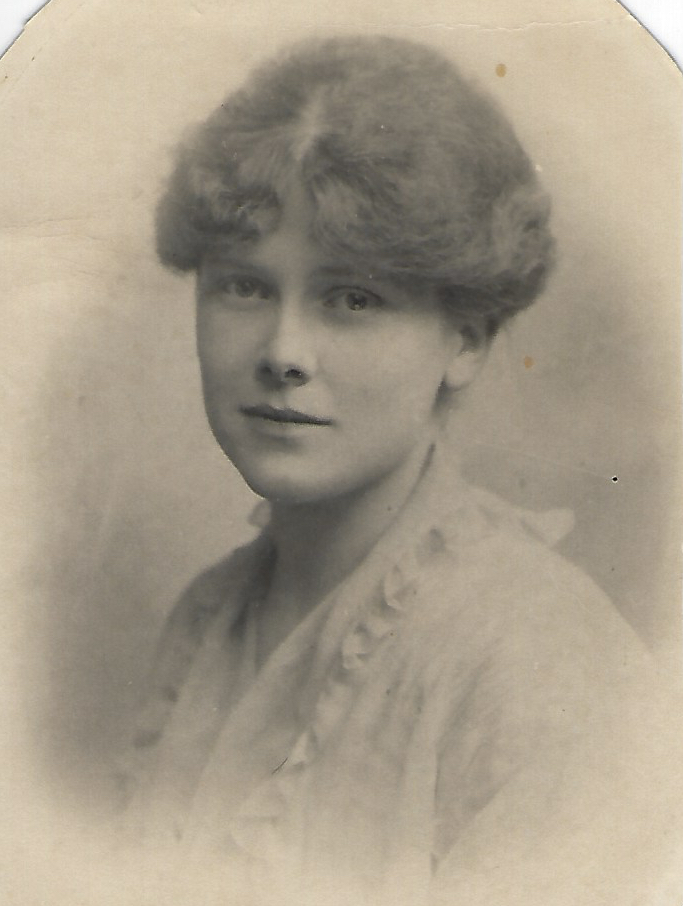
Florence Gallagher, weeks before she married Finlay

The outbreak of War in Europe in 1914 interrupted Finlay's diplomatic service training and in April, we see him restored to the Army lists as a second lieutenant in the 2nd King Edward's Horse "on probation", promoted to full lieutenant by November of the same year. By the end of 1914, Finlay had been promoted to Captain and in 1915 having been badly gassed at the Second Battle of Ypres, he was returned to England to recover from chlorine inhalation. In the same year, we find Finlay assigned to work on the development of Tanks with William Foster & Co. out of Lincoln before reporting to Battalion and Brigade staff. Finlay was twice recommended for promotion to Major in November and December in France "in connection with Trench Warfare inventions".

On 26 June 1916, Finlay married Florence Mary Gallagher in London. The couple were immediately transferred to Paris to work with the French on continued tank development, making frequent trips to Foster's at Lincoln in an effort to coordinate between parallel English and French initiatives. In 1917, Finlay was "invalided out" of the Army and was appointed "Chief of Service" to Inter-Allied and Anglo-American Commissions in Paris from 1918 to 1919.

== League of Nations ==
After the war was over, Finlay was assigned to work in Geneva with the language interpretation unit for the League of Nations in 1919 as a bilingual précis-writer at the newly formed International Labour Organization (ILO). Not content with translation alone, he left the commission in the same year and spent the next five years travelling around Europe, giving lectures on physics and doing consultancy work designing scientific instruments for manufacture. In March 1926, Finlay returned to the League of Nations in Geneva with high hopes of an appointment as General Registrar. His wife was six months pregnant, which encouraged Finlay to think about settling down to a career that combined his passion for science with his language skills as a communicator and a leader. Initially, he was only able to get his old job back at the ILO as a précis-writer on successive short-term contracts. Finlay's opportunity for advancement came in April 1927 when he identified critical weaknesses in an experimental telephonic translation system being trialled at the ILO. He diagnosed the problems with the system, suggested some key alterations with cost estimates and concluded with a plan for doing the work.

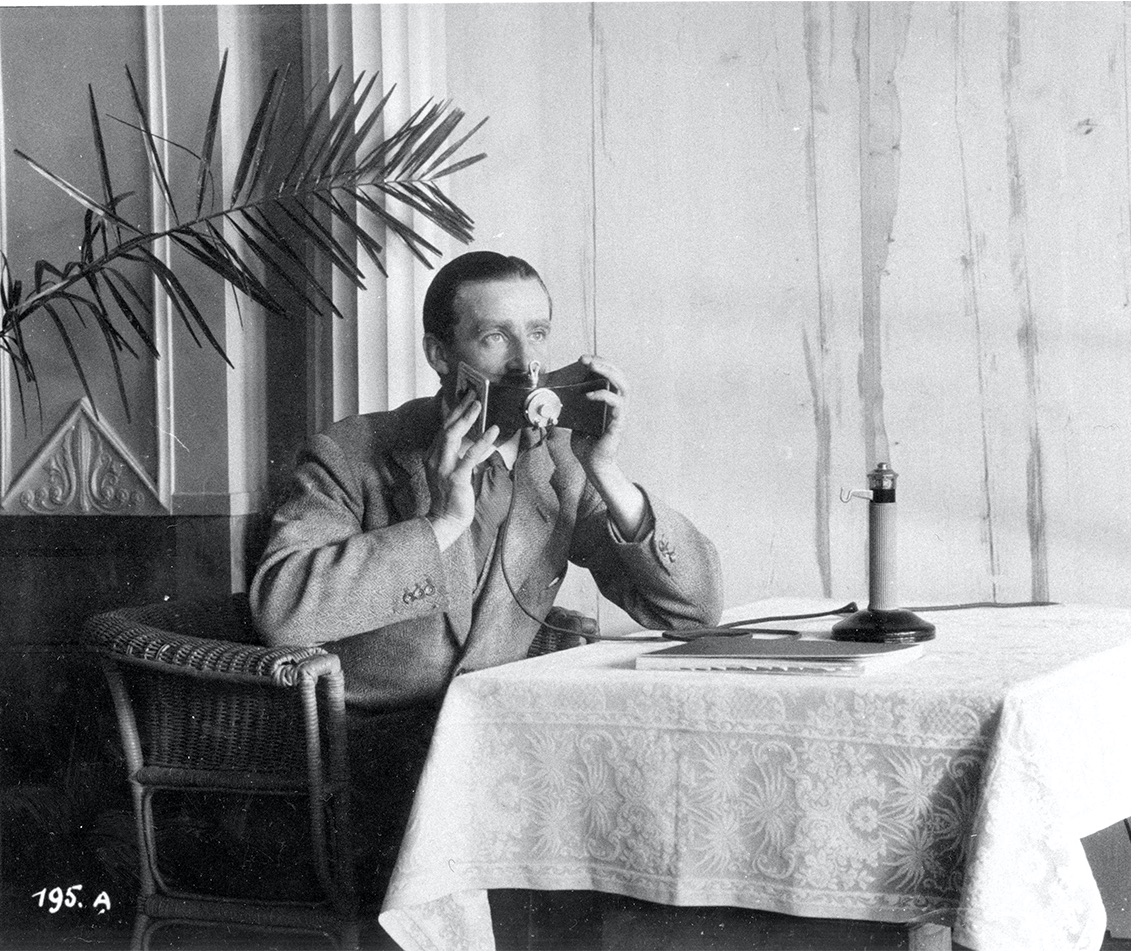
Alan Gordon-Finlay modelling the Hush-a-Phone, a "screened" microphone designed to eliminate acoustic interference with simultaneous translation, circa 1927 – ILO Historical Archives

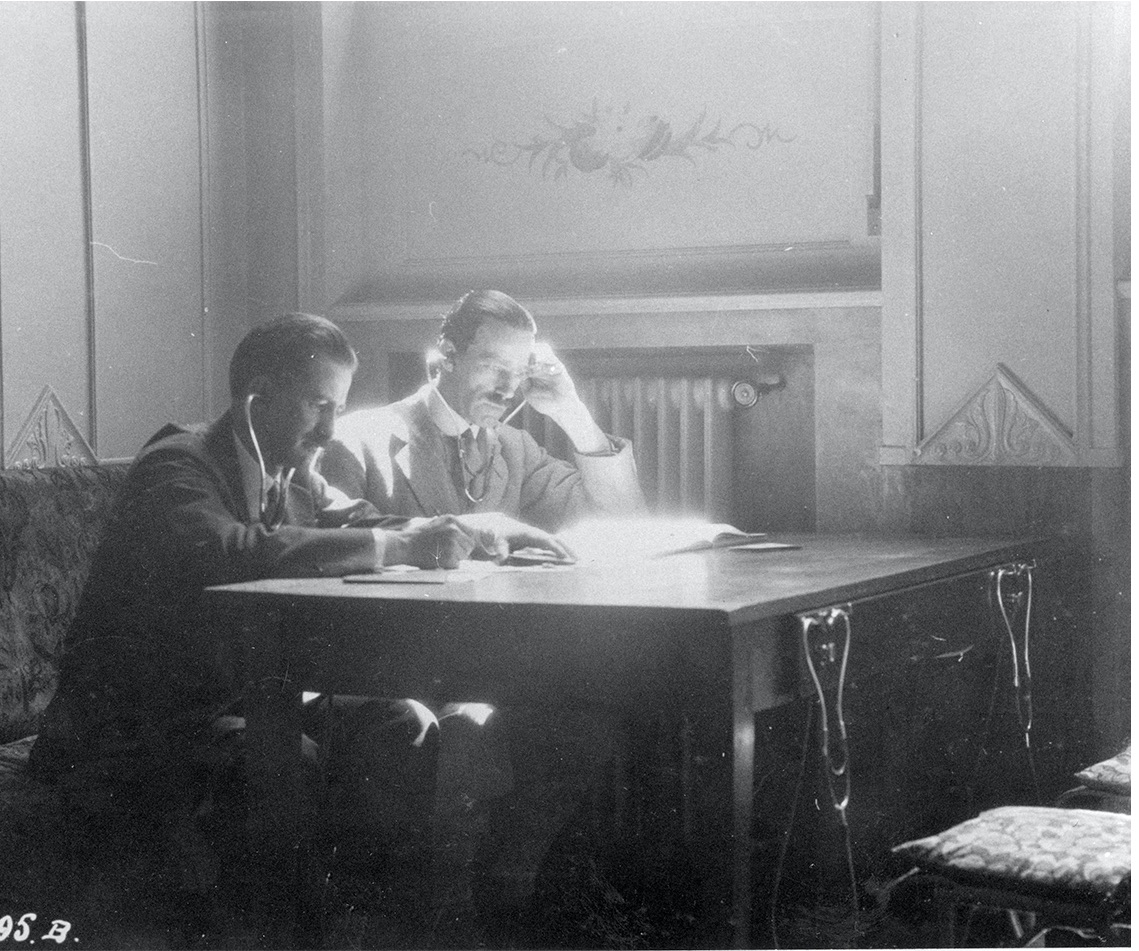
Alan Gordon-Finlay modelling his Stethophone, a kind of early earbud fitted with "pneumatic ear pads", circa 1927 – ILO Historical Archives

By June, Finlay was appointed to take responsibility for the technical delivery of the system. His plans were submitted to Edward Filene, a wealthy, well-connected, philanthropic, American entrepreneur who had devised the original telephonic concept and had been underwriting the costs of development. Tests went well and by September 1927, Filene approved a budget of $10,000 to train interpreters and install Finlay's new designs. Finlay collaborated with the Bell Telephone Company to manufacture component parts, including his own innovations like the Stethophone and for the first time, automatic voice recording. By the spring of 1928, press releases announced ground-breaking new developments evolved by an "English Scientist attached to the International Labour Office" (ILO), referred to as Professor Gordon-Finlay, who was addressing a number of technical issues which needed resolving. The number of "receiver" delegates had increased from one hundred to five hundred, with the number of languages from two to six and was tested in June 1928 at the 11th International Labour Conference under Finlay's direction. Despite doubts going in, the conference proved a success and crucially, demonstrating significant cost savings by shortening proceedings. That proof-of-concept was picked up at the Nuremberg Trials almost twenty years later and arguably lead to the interpretation systems in use today.

Finlay had worked tirelessly to develop and deploy solutions, which was recognised and by 1929, the system had proved both successful and popular, particularly amongst delegates unfamiliar with the two official languages, and began featuring at multiple conferences. ILO historical records indicate that Finlay never had permanent employment with the League of Nations, constantly working under short-term contracts. From 1926 to 1929, his pay was underwritten by Filene, which dried up with the Wall Street crash of 1929. Finlay left the ILO at the end of September 1929. He was, without question, the technical engine behind the new system (Filene had no technical background) but in May 1930, Filene filed a patent for his original concept including Finlay's innovations, but with himself as sole "inventor", excluding Finlay from the application, which IBM subsequently purchased. Finlay was an intensely charismatic man who lead from the front, successfully delivering, and more, on all his extravagant promises made in 1927. Focused as he was on technical delivery, he was naive in the ways of business and had nothing material to show for his efforts at the League of Nations. The world had already moved on, however.

== Second World War ==
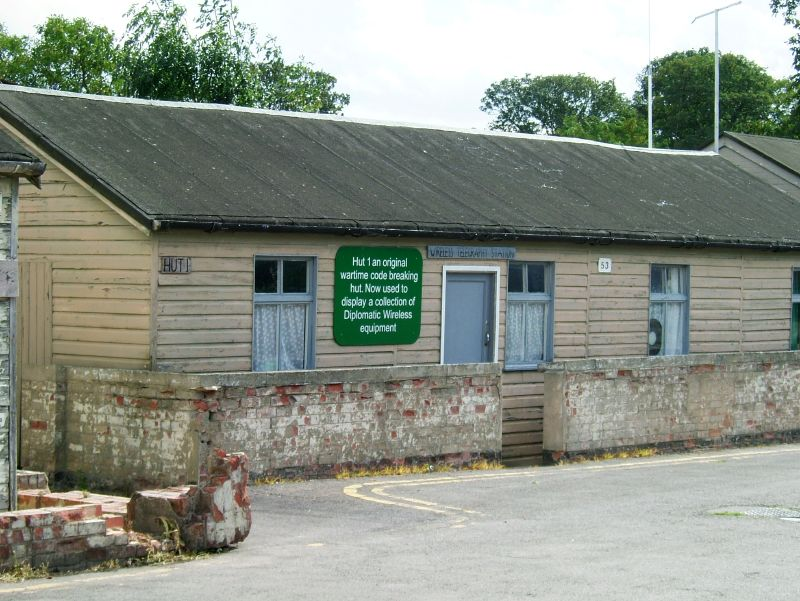
The first hut at Bletchley Park, built in 1939 allegedly used to house the Wireless Station for a short time

In the 1930s, Finlay commuted between his house just outside of Lausanne and his London apartment in Kensington Court. He had managed to secure a more permanent contract with English Electric working with the Marconi teams with a good annual salary. By the end of the decade with war looming again, and with a proven track record of innovation in times of war, Finlay was working with Naval scientists to develop a degaussing system to protect shipping against magnetic naval mines. As conflict in Europe deepened, he would be away from home for long periods but in 1939, his Army commission was reinstated the day after war was declared by the United Kingdom and he was assigned a "unit car and driver". Not long after, Finlay joined Maurice Buckmaster from a secret address at Fountain Court in Belgravia. Finlay does not appear in the published lists as an SOE operative but his "War Substantive" skills with radio and languages were well known to those with whom he worked. At the same time, Reginald Victor Jones started making regular calls to Finlay's Kensington Court apartment, becoming a close family friend. In October 1940, the apartment was destroyed by a bomb, causing the family to scatter, staying with relatives or on assignment.

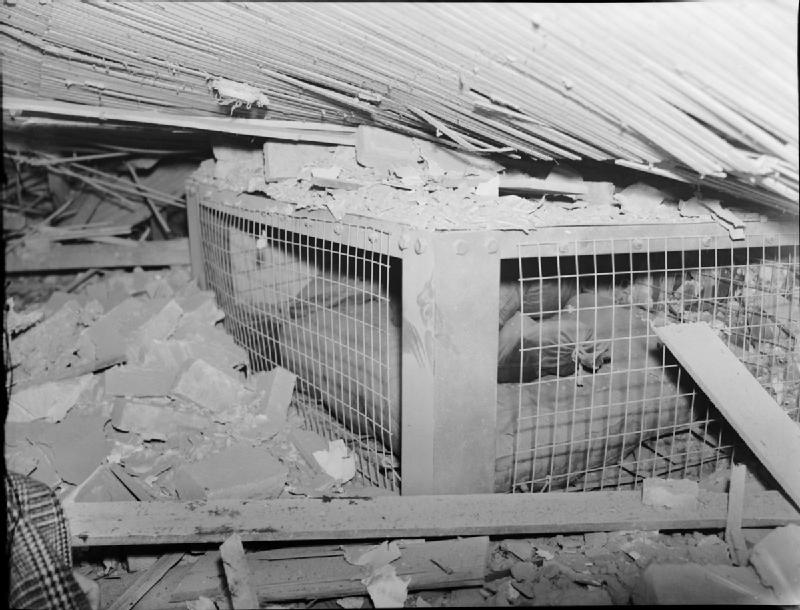
Florence and Dione buried by a "doodle bug" and were rescued through Morrison Shelter like the one photographed

By October 1943, Finlay was sent to Bletchley Park, possible as early as the spring of the same year, apparently brought in by, and in collaboration with, Jones. He is thought to have made at least three parachute drops behind enemy lines at this time but it is unlikely that these were run out of Bletchley. Early in 1944, his first daughter June, who had joined the WRNS, transferred to Bletchley to work on Enigma. Father and daughter were working in the same location under completely different commands. In June of that year, his wife Florence and his second daughter, Dione, were catastrophically buried in the remains of the house they were living in at Beckenham after it was hit by a V-1 flying bomb. Hours later, the only survivors of the explosion, Florence and Dione were dug out, having fallen from the kitchen in to the cellar under the rubble of a three-storey house and spent the next few weeks recovering in hospital. In 1944 the family were able to live together for the first time since 1940 in an apartment in Thornton Hall, one of two apartments, which had been made available to Bletchley Park staff. Finlay's last known operation was to disrupt the V-2 rocket programme at Peenemünde but the mission was cancelled the day before the intended drop. Finlay finally left Bletchley in 1946.

== Legacy ==
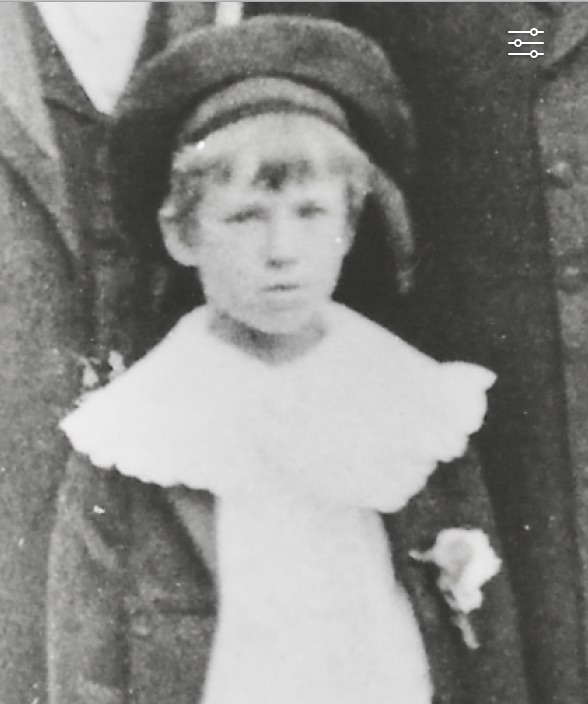
Alan Gordon-Finlay, circa 1898, the year of his first patent

In the 1950s, Finlay launched VIVALUX, a company manufacturing display screens for projected images intended for shop-window displays as well as home entertainment, managed by his daughter June. The company never really took off and by 1957, had ceased trading. Finlay died after a series of heart attacks in January 1959 in Uckfield, Sussex, England.

== Bibliography ==
Professor Jesús Baigorri Jalón – 2014, "From Paris to Nuremberg: The birth of conference interpreting (Benjamins Translation Library)", published John Benjamins Publishing Company; Translation edition (19 June 2014).
