= Peter A. Butler =

British physicist (born 1949)

Peter Butler FRS FInstP
- Born: Peter A. Butler; 22 November 1949 (age 76)
- Awards: Institute of Physics Ernest Rutherford Medal and Prize (2012)
- Scientific career
- Fields: Physics
- Workplaces: University of Liverpool; CERN
- Website: www.liverpool.ac.uk/physics/staff/peter-butler

Peter Anthony Butler FRS FInstP (born 22 November 1949) is a Professor of Physics at the University of Liverpool. He was elected a Fellow of the Royal Society (FRS) in 2019 for "substantial contributions to the improvement of natural knowledge".

He was educated at Borden Grammar School, King's College London (BSc) and the University of Liverpool (PhD, 1974).

His research area is experimental nuclear physics, especially structure of heavy nuclei. He led a group at ISOLDE at CERN who confirmed static octupole form (pear shape) of ^{224}Ra nuclei.
