= Upwaltham =

Village and parish in West Sussex, England

Coordinates: 50.91526°N 0.66016°W

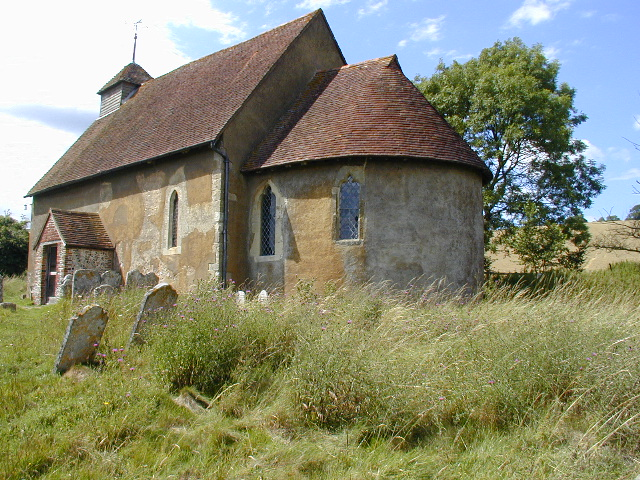
- St Mary the Virgin parish church

- Location within West Sussex
- Area: 4.94 km^{2} (1.91 sq mi)
- Population: 25 (2001 Census)
  - Density: 5/km^{2} (13/sq mi)
- OS grid reference: SU942137
  - London: 47 miles (76 km) NNE
- Civil parish: Upwaltham
- District: Chichester
- Shire county: West Sussex
- Region: South East
- Country: England
- Sovereign state: United Kingdom
- Post town: Petworth
- Postcode district: GU28
- Dialling code: 01798
- Police: Sussex
- Fire: West Sussex
- Ambulance: South East Coast
- UK Parliament: Chichester

Upwaltham is a scattered settlement and civil parish in the South Downs, in the District of Chichester of West Sussex, England. It surrounds a parish church, which is about 5 miles (8 km) south-southwest of Petworth on the A285 road.

The parish is about 2 3/4 miles (4.4 km) long north – south, up to 1 1/4 miles (2 km) wide east – west and has an area of 494 hectares (1,220 acres). The northern part of the parish includes part of North Down, a hill 830 feet (253 m) high.

The 2001 Census recorded a parish population of 25 people, living in 10 households. The scattered settlement is in a dry valley. Around the parish church are two farmsteads and two cottages. The barns of one of the farmsteads, Upwaltham House Farm, are now a conference and wedding venue.

About 1 mile (1.6 km) south of the church are a few houses at Benges, where the A285 to Chichester leaves the valley. From Benges the parish extends south as far as Jackdine Farm.

== Public transport ==
Compass Bus route 99 between Petworth and Chichester serves Upwaltham six days a week, from Monday to Saturday. There is no service in the evening, or on Sunday or public holidays.

== History ==
Prehistoric remains in the parish include a set of Bronze Age round barrows on Waltham Down in the north of the parish. Also Middle Bronze Age are the cross dykes on Upwaltham Hill.

"Waltham" is a common English place-name, derived from the Old English weald, meaning wood, and hām, meaning meadow or enclosure. The prefix "Up" indicates that it is higher than a neighbouring settlement.

From the Middle Ages onward, Upwaltham was in the hundred of Boxgrove in the Rape of Chichester. The Domesday Book of 1086 records it as having 11 households including one slave; resources included woodland, and land for ploughing and for pigs. There were two manors: one of six hides and the other of four.

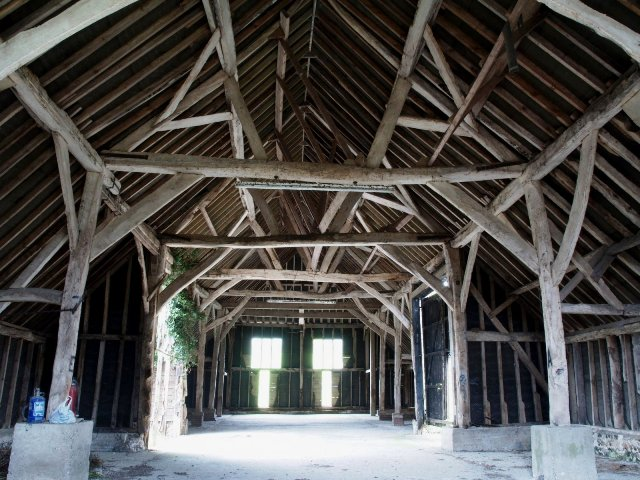
17th-century timber frame inside Church Farm barn

At Church Farm, just west of the parish church, is a 17th-century barn. It has a timber queen post frame, weatherboarded walls and tiled roof. It is a Grade II* listed building.

== Parish church ==
The Church of England parish church of St Mary the Virgin is now part of a combined Benefice with All Hallows, Tillington.

The church building is 12th-century Norman. It is built of stone and flint, with walls 3 feet (0.9 m) thick. The font and piscina are Norman. The font is plain, but the piscina seems to be made from a reused Norman column capital. The chancel is an apse, linked to the nave by a 13th-century pointed arch. Some of the windows and the arch for the south door are 14th-century. The porch and floor tiles are 19th-century. The church is a Grade I listed building.

Parish records of births and deaths from 1592 are held by the West Sussex Record Office.

== Air crashes ==
There have been at least two notable air crashes in the parish. In 1944 an RAF Avro Lancaster crashed on Waltham Down. In 1945 a USAAF Douglas C-47 Skytrain crashed into Upwaltham Hill. In 1949 two RAF Gloster Meteors crashed in the area, one of them possibly in Upwaltham parish.

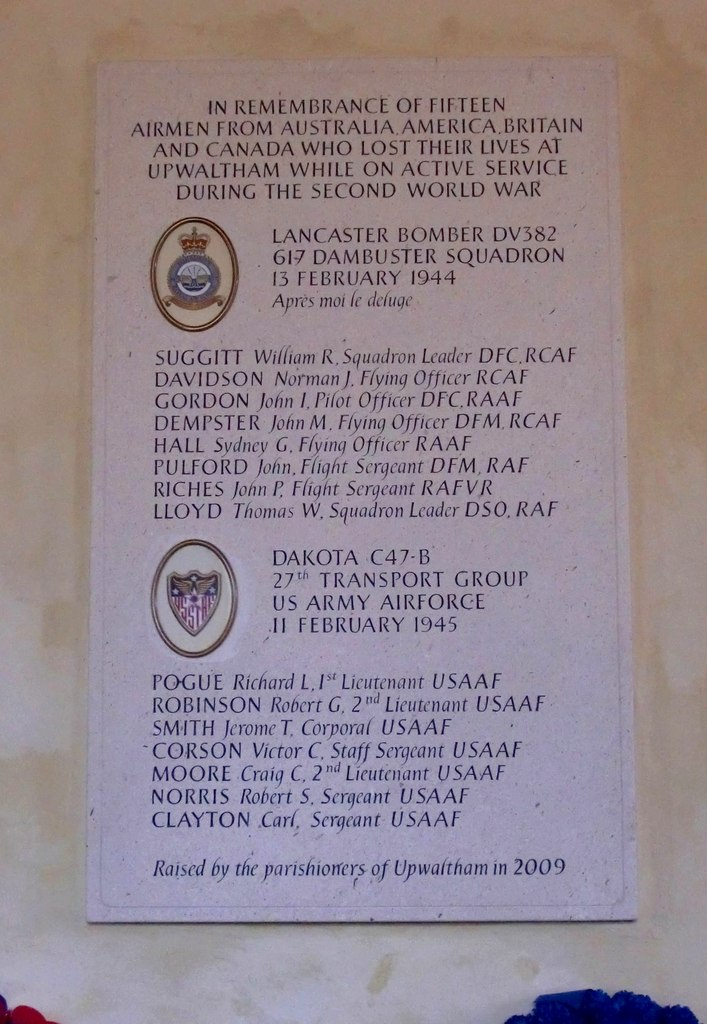
Memorial plaque in St Mary the Virgin parish church

The Lancaster was from 617 Squadron at RAF Woodhall Spa in Lincolnshire. On 12 February 1944 it had landed at RNAS Ford on the way back from a mission, and on the morning of 13 February it took off to return to Woodhall Spa. There was low cloud and visibility was poor. The Lancaster hit trees on Waltham Down, broke up and caught fire.

Of the eight airmen aboard, seven were killed on impact. Local farmworkers rescued the pilot from the cockpit, but he was badly burned and died two days later in St Richard's Hospital in Chichester. The pilot and two other crewmen were from the Royal Canadian Air Force. Two other members of the crew were from the Royal Australian Air Force.

The Skytrain was from the 27th Transport Group. On 11 February 1945 it was on a flight from Paris–Le Bourget Airport to RAF Grove in Berkshire. It crossed the Sussex coast about 1125 hrs at an altitude of only 300 to 400 feet (91 to 122 m). The weather was worsening, visibility had decreased to 25 yards (23 m), and the crew may not have realised they were no longer over the sea. The aircraft's port wing hit trees on Upwaltham Hill and was torn off. The aircraft seems to have cartwheeled before breaking up. All seven men aboard were killed.

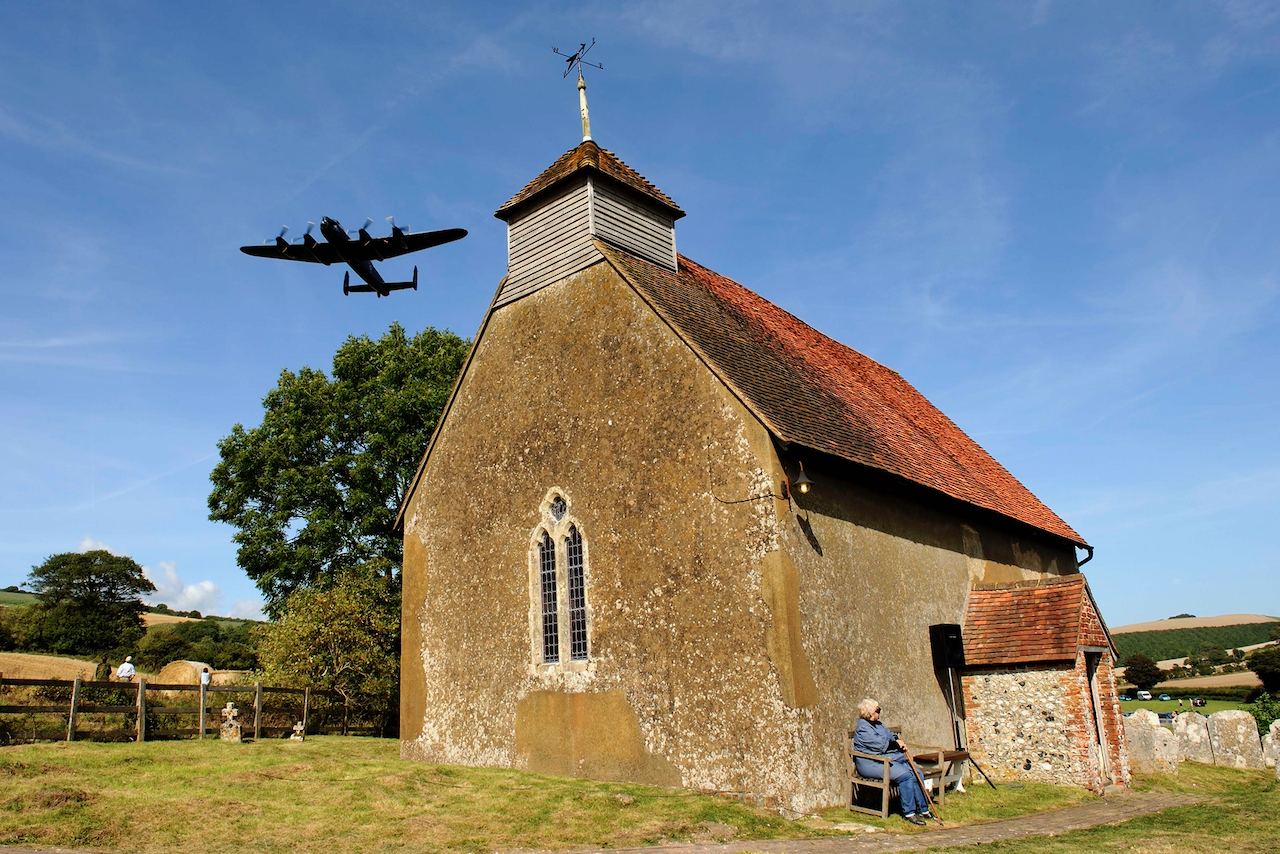
Upwaltham memorial, 2009

On 25 November 1949 two Gloster Meteor Mk IV aircraft of 43 Squadron at RAF Tangmere crashed on the South Downs, killing their pilots. Some reports suggest that one of the aircraft crashed in Upwaltham parish.

In 2003, a local resident, Dione Venables, started work on creating a permanent memorial to commemorate the 15 airmen killed in the Lancaster and Skytrain crashes, and in 2009 an engraved stone plaque was unveiled in St Mary the Virgin parish church including a rare flypast of a World War Two Lancaster Bomber.

== Bibliography ==
- Ekwall, Eilert (1960) [1936]. Concise Oxford Dictionary of English Place-Names (4th ed.). Oxford: Oxford University Press. Duncton. ISBN 0198691033.
- Godwin, Jeremy (1991). The Church in the Field, A Guide to the Church. (Available at the church)
- Nairn, Ian; Pevsner, Nikolaus (1965). Sussex. The Buildings of England. Harmondsworth: Penguin Books. pp. 213–214. ISBN 0-14-071028-0.
- Salzman, LF, ed. (1953). "Up Waltham". A History of the County of Sussex. Victoria County History. Vol. 4: The Rape of Chichester. Oxford University Press for the Institute of Historical Research. ISBN 978-0712905886.
