= Erasmus Willson =

English cricketer

Personal information
- Full name: Erasmus Albert Willson
- Born: 13 October 1878; Sittingbourne, Kent
- Died: 17 April 1948 (aged 69); Sittingbourne, Kent
- Batting: Right-handed
- Bowling: Right-arm fast
- Role: Bowler

Domestic team information
- Years: Team
- 1898: Kent
- Only FC: 27 June 1898 Kent v Notts
- Source: CricInfo, 13 October 2023

Erasmus Albert Willson (13 October 1878 – 17 April 1948) was an English first-class cricketer who played in a single first-class match for Kent County Cricket Club during the 1898 season.

Willson was born at Sittingbourne in Kent in 1878, the son of dentist James Willson and his wife Catherine (née Twort). He was educated at Borden Grammar School in the town where he played in the cricket XI and was considered a strong enough bowler to be offered a trial at Kent's Tonbridge Nursery after leaving school in 1897. He impressed in a trial Second XI match at the end of the season and was brought on to the county's professional staff during the winter.

Playing as an amateur, Willson played his only first-class match during the following season. He took a single wicket and scored a total of nine runs during the match, a County Championship fixture against Nottinghamshire at Trent Bridge in June. He played club cricket for Gore Court Cricket Club in Sittingbourne, and took seven wickets in two further Second XI matches later in the 1898 season, but opted to pursue a career as a bank clerk, and did not play for the county again after the end of the season.

Willson married Nora Champion at Wandsworth in 1903. The couple had one son and lived at Mitcham and Streatham. During World War I he enlisted in the British Army in December 1915, but was not called for a medical until May 1917, when he joined 2 battalion, Artists Rifles. He was posted to Hare Hall Camp at Romford in Essex in August where he served as a private, helping to train officer cadets. He remained at Hare Hall for the rest of the war and was demobilised at Crystal Palace in February 1919.

Later in life Willson returned to Sittingbourne. He died in the town in 1948 aged 69.

== Bibliography ==
- Carlaw, Derek (2020). Kent County Cricketers, A to Z: Part One (1806–1914) (PDF). Cardiff: ACS.
