= Wakeford Nunatak =

Wakeford Nunatak (67°49′S 63°2′E) is a small nunatak 3 nautical miles (6 km) east of the Central Masson Range in the Framnes Mountains, Mac. Robertson Land, Antarctica. Plotted from photos taken from ANARE (Australian National Antarctic Research Expeditions) aircraft in 1960 and seen by an ANARE party in 1962. Named by Antarctic Names Committee of Australia (ANCA) for R. Wakeford, cook at Mawson Station in 1962.
