= Wesford Graduate Business School =

- École Supérieure de Commerce Wesford
- Type: Private
- Established: 1987
- Dean: Alex Lienard
- Academic staff: 100
- Students: 1,000
- Location: Geneva, Grenoble and Lyon, France, Switzerland
- Website: www.wesford.fr

Wesford Graduate Business School was established in 1987 in Grenoble, Lyon and Geneva, France. The dean and president of the school is Alex Lienar. Originally located close to the University of Grenoble, it later moved to the city centre.
