= Wake Forest =

Wake Forest may refer to:

- Wake Forest, North Carolina, a town near Raleigh, North Carolina
- Wake Forest University, a university founded in the above town and now located in Winston-Salem, North Carolina
  - Wake Forest School of Medicine, the university's medical school
  - Wake Forest Baptist Medical Center, a hospital affiliated with the university
- Wake Forest, name of the plantation owned by Calvin Jones (physician) that became the first home of Wake Forest University
- Wake Forest Demon Deacons, athletic teams from Wake Forest University

== See also ==
- Lake Forest College, a college located in Lake Forest, Illinois
