= Trevor Dadson =

Trevor John Dadson, FBA (7 October 1947 – 28 January 2020) was a British Hispanic scholar.
