= Edward Wakeford =

English geometer

Edward Kingsley Wakeford (E. K. Wakeford; 15 June 1894 – 26 July 1916) was an English geometer.

Born at Plymouth, England, the son of Edward W. Wakeford of Gibraltar, E. K. was educated at Borden Grammar School and Clifton College then entered Trinity College, Cambridge with a mathematics scholarship in 1912. As a scholar of mathematics, he extended the work of the English mathematician James Joseph Sylvester (1814–1897) on canonical binary forms for odd degrees, solving the forms for even degrees. At the time, he was recognized by some mathematicians as a future leader in the field of geometry. In September 1914 he was commissioned in the Leicestershire Regiment of the British Army and served during World War I. On 26 July 1916 he was killed in action on the Western Front.

== Bibliography ==
- Miquel's theorem and the double six, Proceedings of the London Mathematical Society, 1918.
- Apolarity and canonical forms, Proceedings of the London Mathematical Society, 1918.
- On canonical forms, Proceedings of the London Mathematical Society, 1920.
- Chords of twisted cubics, Proceedings of the London Mathematical Society, 1923.
