= Simultaneous interpretation =

Real-time translation from a source language to a target language

Simultaneous interpretation (SI) is one form of language voice translation where an interpreter translates the message from the source language to a target language in real-time, without pausing to listen to the source first. Unlike in consecutive interpreting, this way the natural flow of the speaker is not disturbed and allows for a fairly smooth output for the listeners.

== History ==
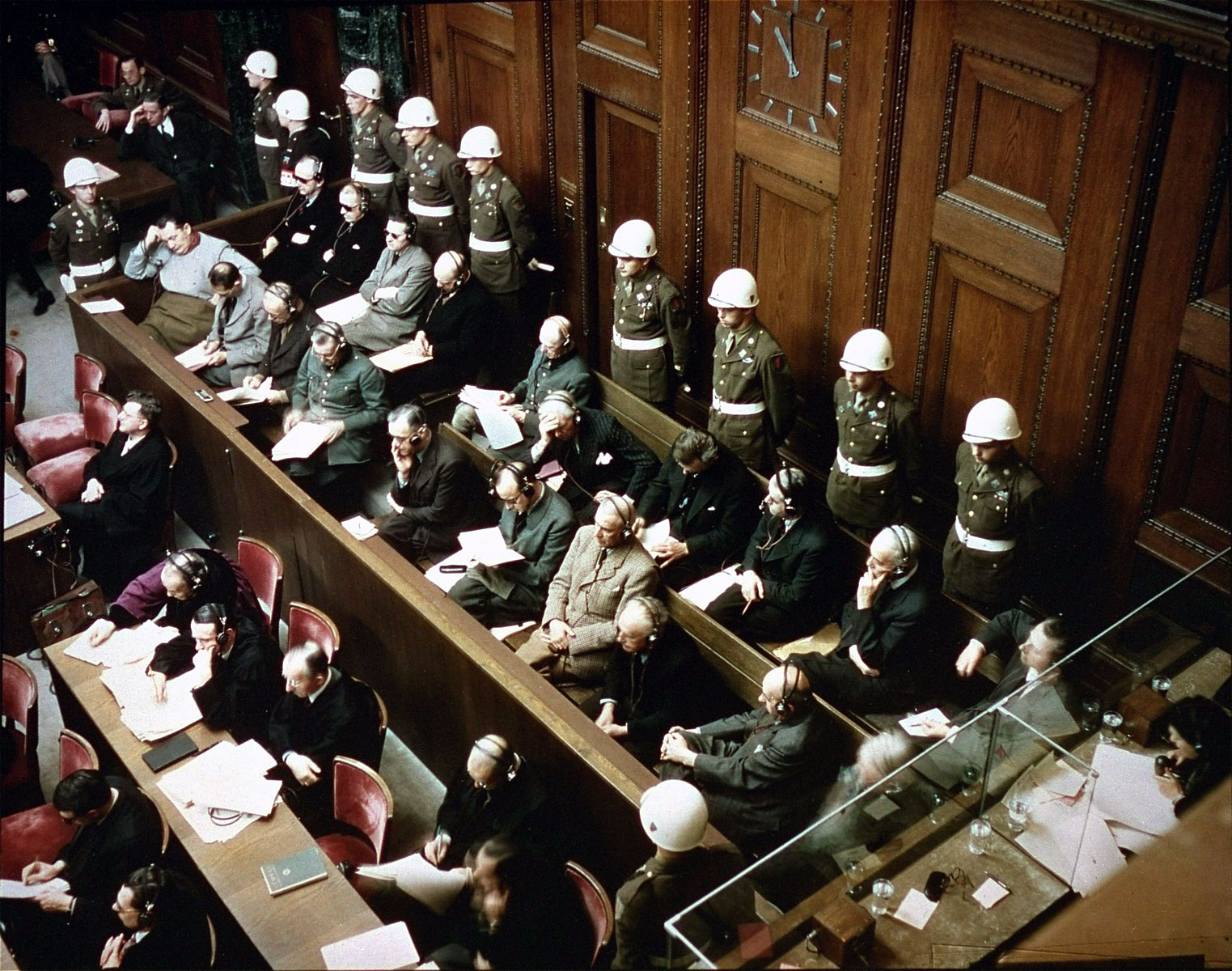
Nuremberg defendants at dock listening to simultaneous interpretation

The Nuremberg trials (1945–1946) are considered to be the official birthdate of simultaneous interpretation; however, simultaneous interpretation was invented as early as in 1926. A patent was received by an IBM employee Alan Gordon Finlay and was used sporadically before the Second World War. Finlay played an essential role in the design and development of SI equipment together with Edward Filene, the American businessman and philanthropist.

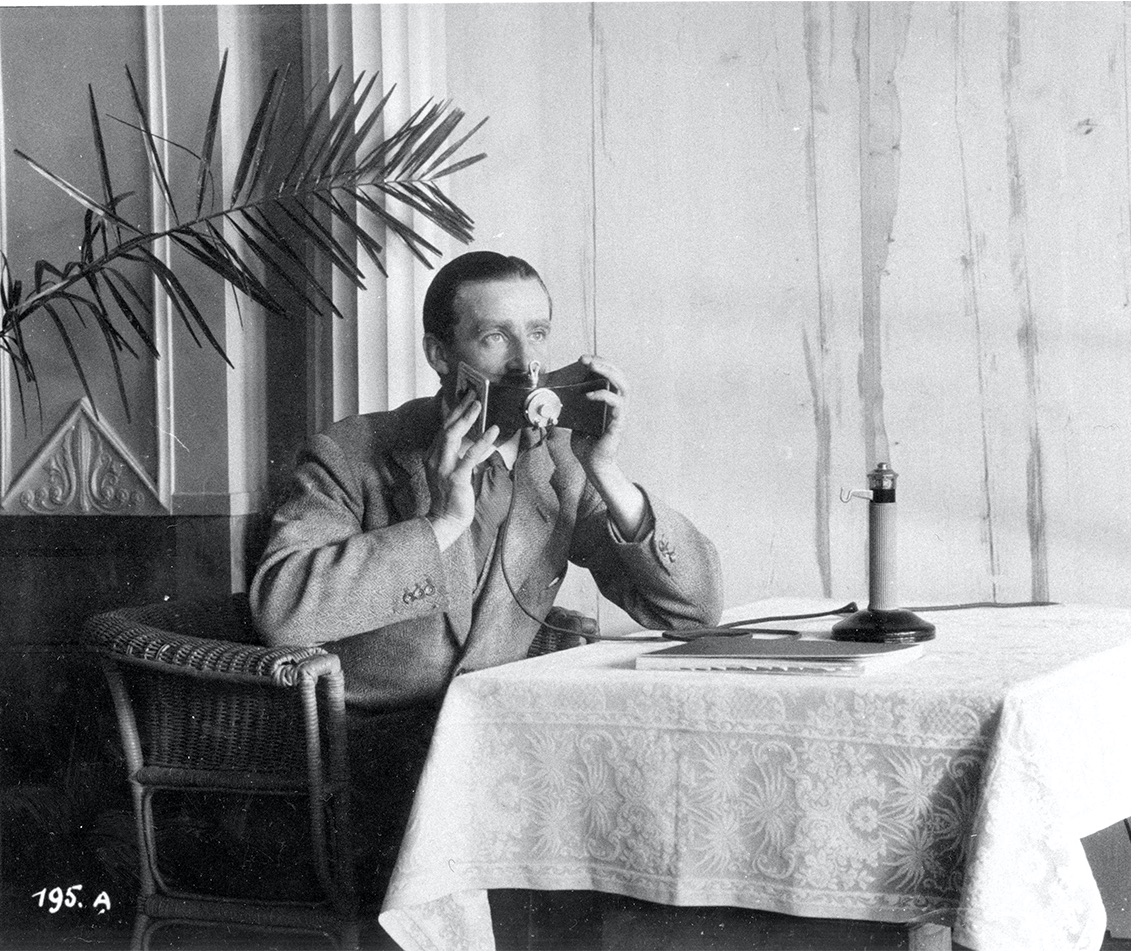
Alan Gordon-Finlay trialling the Hush-A-Phone at the League of Nations, c. 1927 – ILO Historical Archives

In 1925, E. Filene wrote a letter to Sir. E. Drummond in which the concept simultaneous interpretation is used for the first time in written history. In this letter, E. Filene talked about his idea to use simultaneous interpretation in the League of Nations as early as April 2, 1925. Filene wrote to Sir. E. Drummond on that day:

"One high-quality microphone will be placed on a pedestal or stand at the speaker's location to pick up his words. This microphone will be connected through an amplifier to a number of headsets which will be installed in an adjoining quiet room. Each headset will terminate at an interpreter's booth or position in the room. The interpreter's booth will be provided with an ordinary telephone desk stand on which is mounted a high-quality close-talking microphone which will be connected through another amplifier to a number of headsets located at a designated section of the auditorium or meeting hall. The translated speech of each interpreter would follow simultaneously with the delivery of the original speech, the only delay being that of recording the speech and the ability of the interpreter to translate directly and rapidly from the stenographic notes received from the recorder."

The Nuremberg trials employed four official languages: English, French, German and Russian. It was feared that consecutive interpretation would slow down the proceedings significantly. This led to the introduction of an entirely new technique, extempore simultaneous interpretation. This technique of interpretation requires the interpreter to listen to a speaker in a source (or passive) language and orally translate that speech into another language in real-time, that is, simultaneously, through headsets and microphones. Interpreters were split into four sections, one for each official language, with three interpreters per section working from the other three languages into the fourth (their mother tongue). For instance, the English booth consisted of three interpreters, one working from German into English, one working from French, and one from Russian, etc. Witnesses who did not speak any of the four official languages were provided with consecutive court interpreters. Some of the languages heard over the course of the proceedings included Yiddish, Hungarian, Czech, Ukrainian, and Polish.

Interpreters were recruited and examined by the respective countries in which the official languages were spoken: the United States, United Kingdom, France, the Soviet Union, Germany, Switzerland, and Austria, as well as in special cases Belgium and the Netherlands. Many were former translators, army personnel, and linguists, some were experienced consecutive interpreters, others were ordinary individuals and even recent secondary school-graduates who led international lives in multilingual environments. It was believed, that the qualities that made the best interpreters were a broad sense of culture, encyclopedic knowledge, inquisitiveness, as well as a naturally calm disposition.

Yet, despite the extensive trial and error, without the interpretation system the trials would not have been possible and in turn, revolutionized the way multilingual issues were addressed in tribunals and conferences. A number of the interpreters following the trials were recruited into the newly formed United Nations.

== Modes ==
- Simultaneous interpretation with electronic/electric equipment – Using this method, the information is transferred into the target language the moment interpreters understand a "unit" of meaning. The speakers and the interpreters talk into microphones, and the interpreters and the listeners use earphones.
- Whispered interpreting or chuchotage – This is simultaneous interpreting without equipment. It works just like simultaneous interpretation with equipment but in this case, no microphones or headphones are used. Simultaneous interpreters sit next to the people who do not understand the source language and whisper the interpretation in their ears.

== Equipment ==
Traditional conference interpreting equipment (hardware) helps to make sure that all listeners can understand interpretation well. The process of simultaneous interpretation with traditional hardware commonly utilizes the following steps:

1. The speaker talks into a microphone.
2. His or her speech is broadcast to the interpreter who sits in a sound-proof interpreter booth and listens through headphones.
3. As the interpreter listens to the speech, he or she translates it in real-time into a microphone.
4. The interpretation is transmitted wirelessly to the headphones of the event attendees.

== Interpreter booths ==
Interpreter booths are a must for simultaneous interpretation where traditional equipment is used. Interpreters have to be in the venue and it tends to get quite noisy. Having in mind the stress the interpreters have to endure during big conferences, it is very important to ensure they have a sound-proof working environment – that is, interpreter booths.

Interpreter booths can be either permanent or mobile. Both variants are strictly regulated by the International Organization for Standardization (ISO) standards relating to conference interpreting.

As for the shape, interpreter booths come as tabletop booths and as full-size interpreting booths. As the name suggests, the first ones are placed on the top of the table and are great because they're easy to transport and set up. On the other hand, they're open in the back, which means you can't completely ensure comfortable work conditions for the interpreters because these booths are not fully sound-proof.

Full-size interpreter booths are like little houses. They have walls, floors, ceilings, doors, and their own ventilation systems. Usually, they can fit at least two interpreters and larger booths can fit even four. Naturally, such interpreter booths are much harder to transport and assemble and require at least a couple of technicians for this task.

- Interpreters need to have a clear view of speakers, the podium and presentations.
- Interpreters also need great access to the Internet.
- They also need to have a sufficient number of power outlets for their laptops, tablets, and any other gadgets they may need to work.
- High air quality is a non-negotiable for obvious reasons, too. That's where sensors that measure CO_{2} step in.
- Optimal acoustic conditions, meaning fans should be as quiet as possible and sound insulation from other booths should be close to perfection.
