= King Edward's Horse =

British Army cavalry regiment

- Active: 1901–1924
- Country: United Kingdom
- Branch: British Army
- Type: Cavalry
- Role: Yeomanry
- Size: Regiment
- Garrison/HQ: Duke of York's Headquarters
- Motto(s): Regi adsumus Coloni (Colonials venture for the King)
- Engagements: First World War

King Edward's Horse (The King's Overseas Dominions Regiment) was a cavalry regiment of the British Army, formed in 1901, which saw service in the First World War.

== Early history ==
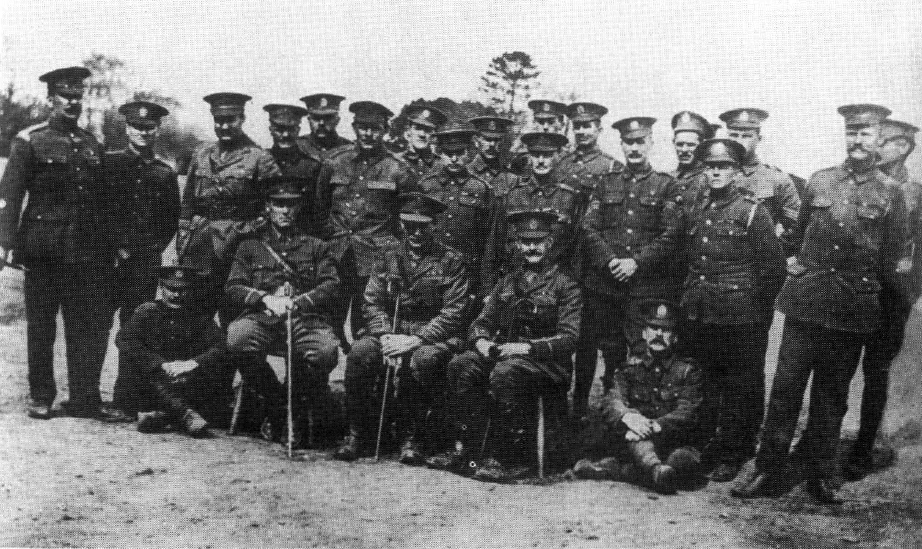
Rhodesian members of King Edward's Horse during the First World War

The regiment was originally formed as part of the Imperial Yeomanry in November 1901, as the 4th County of London Imperial Yeomanry (King's Colonials), with the Prince of Wales (later King George V) as honorary colonel. It was composed of four squadrons of colonial volunteers resident in London - one of Asians (British Asian Squadron), one of Canadians (British American Squadron), one of Australasians (Australasian Squadron), and one of South Africans and Rhodesians (British African Squadron). A New Zealand squadron was later formed, with the Australasian squadron being redesignated as Australian. It did not see service in the South African War. In 1905 it was retitled The King's Colonials, Imperial Yeomanry, and in 1908 became part of the Yeomanry in the Territorial Force. In 1909 the specific affiliations of the squadrons ended. With the death of Edward VII, after whom it had been named, it was retitled King Edward's Horse (The King's Overseas Dominions Regiment) in 1910. In 1913, it was transferred into the Special Reserve, and ceased to be considered yeomanry. After the 2nd King Edward's Horse was raised in 1914, the regiment became known as 1st King Edward's Horse.

== First World War ==
On the outbreak of war in 1914, the regiment was mobilised at the Duke of York's Headquarters in Chelsea, London, and remained in London until April 1915. At this point, the regiment was dispersed, and the four squadrons were sent to the Western Front with separate divisions. They were reunited in June 1916, the regiment serving as corps troops, and moved to Italy in December 1917. The regiment returned to France in March 1918, serving until the end of hostilities. Some reports suggest that the final British casualty of the war was a private in C squadron. During the First World War Langley Park House was used as a hospital for officers of the 2nd Regiment of King Edward's Horse.

== King's Colonials Lodge ==
The regiment was disbanded in March 1924, and both it and its comrades' association have ceased to exist. However, in 1909 the regiment officially sanctioned and formed a regimental masonic lodge, the King's Colonials Lodge No 3386, in London. As the number of surviving members of the closed regiment dwindled, they opened membership of the regimental Lodge to all interested persons, and passed all regimental traditions to the Lodge. The Worshipful Master of the Lodge has an official entitlement to wear the regimental tie. The Lodge continues to function, and to maintain regimental traditions. It continues to tend regimental graves, and to lay wreaths at the regimental memorials in London and France.

== Colonels ==
Honorary colonels were as follows:

- The Prince of Wales 29 November 1901

== Battle honours ==
The regiment's battle honours were as follows:

The Great War

- Loos
- Ypres 1917
- Pilckem
- Cambrai 1917
- Lys
- Estaires
- Hazebrouck
- Pursuit to Mons
- France and Flanders 1915-16 '18
- Italy 1917-18

== Uniforms ==
Upon its establishment in November 1901 this regiment wore a khaki serge uniform with narrow scarlet stripes on the turn-down collar, cuffs and khaki cord breeches. The headdress was a wide-brimmed hat of khaki felt with a scarlet plume and lancer style lines. Unusually three badges were worn on the hat - two regimental badges in different sizes plus one squadron badge (elephant, beaver, kangaroo, ostrich or fern-leaf according to the parts of the Empire from which the London-based colonials originated). After 1904 a number of new features were introduced, including a large drooping plume of black/green cocks feathers modelled on that of the Italian Bersaglieri. Until the outbreak of the First World War, the uniform for full dress and off-duty wear remained khaki with scarlet braiding, piping and double trouser stripes. The plain khaki field uniform of the British Army was adopted for training, active service and ordinary duty after 1907 and increasingly worn until the regiment was disbanded in 1924.

== See also ==
- County of London Yeomanry
- 2nd King Edward's Horse
