= Phyllis Court =

Private club in Henley-on-Thames, Oxfordshire, England

Phyllis Court Club
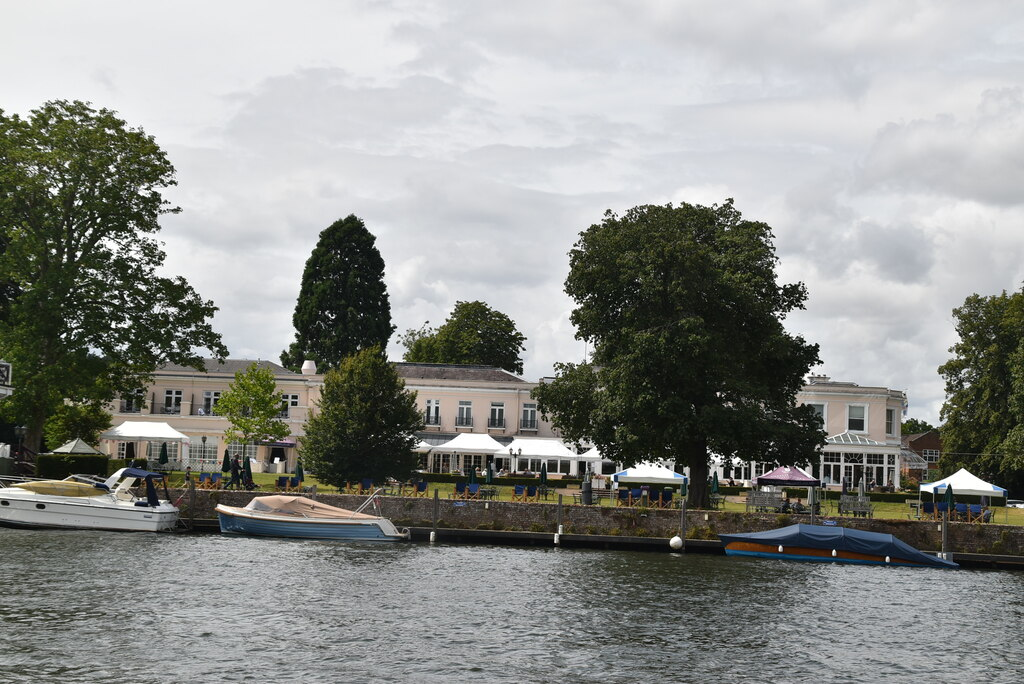
- Founded: 2 June 1906
- Founder: Roy Finlay
- Type: Private members club
- Purpose: Club and hotel on the River Thames
- Location: Henley-on-Thames, Oxfordshire, England
- Website: www.phylliscourt.co.uk

Phyllis Court is a building that currently houses a private members club, the Phyllis Court Club, and is situated by the River Thames in Henley-on-Thames, Oxfordshire, England.

The club was founded in 1906 and is located in a Georgian-style building set within its own grounds, close to the town centre. It overlooks the finish line of the Henley Royal Regatta and is also slightly downstream (and on the opposite bank) from Leander Club and upstream of Remenham Club and Upper Thames Rowing Club. There is a rowing club on the river at Phyllis Court, the Phyllis Court Rowing Club, for recreational rowing.

== History ==
The original building on this site dates from 1301. It was the manor house of Henley-on-Thames and was known as Fillets Court. Queen Anne, the consort of King James I, visited the house in 1604. In 1643, troops loyal to Oliver Cromwell built a wall which still edges the garden near the river. The wall was built with the bricks remaining from the old Manor House which was burned by Royalists.

In the mid-17th century, Phillis Court was the home of Sir Bulstrode Whitelocke (1605–1675), parliamentarian and Lord Keeper of the Great Seal, who before his death gave it up to his son William Whitelock, later Tory member of parliament for the University of Oxford. In 1689, William of Orange, on his way to London, held his first court here. Sir William Whitelock died at the house in 1717. The property later belonged to Edward Cooper, who sold Phillis Court to Sambrooke Freeman, the owner of Fawley Court nearby, in 1768.

The club was founded in 1906. In 1939, the clubhouse was requisitioned by HM Government for the duration of the Second World War. It was first used as a WAAF Officers' mess for the Central Interpretation Unit at RAF Medmenham. Later it housed a top-secret unit making important photographic mosaics and models of the future Allied landing beaches in France and planning many raids including the "Dambusters". The clubhouse ended the war on a more peaceful note being used by the American Red Cross as a rest centre for war-weary airmen.

On 6 November 1998, Queen Elizabeth II visited the club before travelling upriver by boat to open the River and Rowing Museum.

== List of chairmen of the council ==
The following have been chairmen of the council for Phyllis Court:

- 1935-1937 - Brigadier General E. S. Hoare Nairne, CB, CMG
- 1937-1938 - Sir Gilbert Eliott, Bart.
- 1938-1944 - Brigadier General E. S. Hoare Nairne, CB, CMG
- 1944-1953 - Commander Robert H. Glen, RNVR
- 1953-1955 - Captain H.J. Pullein Thompson, MC
- 1955-1958 - H.R.E. Bradshaw
- 1958-1961 - J.A. Burrell
- 1961-1964 - M.K. Watson
- 1964-1967 - G.J. Abraham, OBE
- 1967-1970 - Dr W.A. Alexander
- 1970-1973 - A.J. Claisse, JP
- 1973-1976 - H.P. Rosewarne
- 1976-1977 - Group Captain R.E.G. Brittain, MA, RAF (Rtd)
- 1977-1978 - W.A. Sivyer
- 1978 - Sir Edward Beetham, KCMG, CVO, OBE
- 1978-1983 - H. Harly-Burton, TD
- 1983-1985 - Mrs Norah Adlam
- 1985-1988 - R.R. Willgoss
- 1988-1990 - A.J. Dore
- 1990-1993 - E.V. Adams, CB
- 1993-1995 - J.A. Simmons
- 1995-1997 - N.R. Laurie
- 1997-1999 - G.R. Hattam
- 1999-2001 - S.B. Drew
- 2001-2003 - P.T. Williamson
- 2003-2004 - A.F.M. Friendship
- 2004 - A.D. Robson
- 2004-2007 - T.R.G. Johansen
- 2007-2009 - D.A.E. Melck (Deon Adrian Melck)
- 2009-2012 - F.G. Fielding
- 2012-2015 - J.B. Hardman
- 2015-2018 - Patricia Christmas
- 2018-2019 - Barry Jackson
- 2019-2022 - Stan Ainsley
- 2022-2025 - Barry Jackson
- 2025-2026 - Stephen Gill
- 2026 – present - Dave Smith
