= 2nd King Edward's Horse =

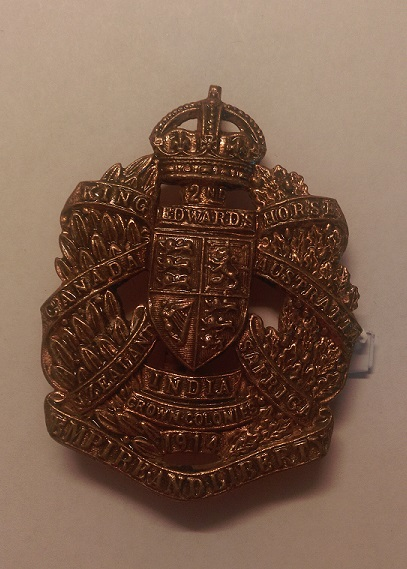
- Badge of 2nd King Edward's Horse
- Active: 1914–1917
- Country: United Kingdom
- Branch: British Army
- Type: Cavalry
- Role: Yeomanry
- Size: Regiment

The 2nd King Edward's Horse (The King's Overseas Dominions Regiment) was a cavalry regiment of the British Army, formed in 1914, which saw service in the First World War. It was formed of British colonial citizens who were in Britain at the start of the war.

== History ==
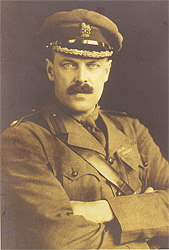
John Norton-Griffiths, who raised the 2nd King Edward's Horse

The regiment was raised in 1914 by John (later Sir John) Norton-Griffiths, at his own expense. The original regiment was subsequently known as 1st King Edward's Horse. The regiment served in France with XIV Corps and saw action during Winter operations in 1914–1915, the First Battle of Ypres in autumn 1914, the Second Battle of Ypres in spring 1915 and in the Battle of the Somme in autumn 1916 during the First World War. It was disbanded in August 1917 with many of its members being transferred to the Tank Corps.

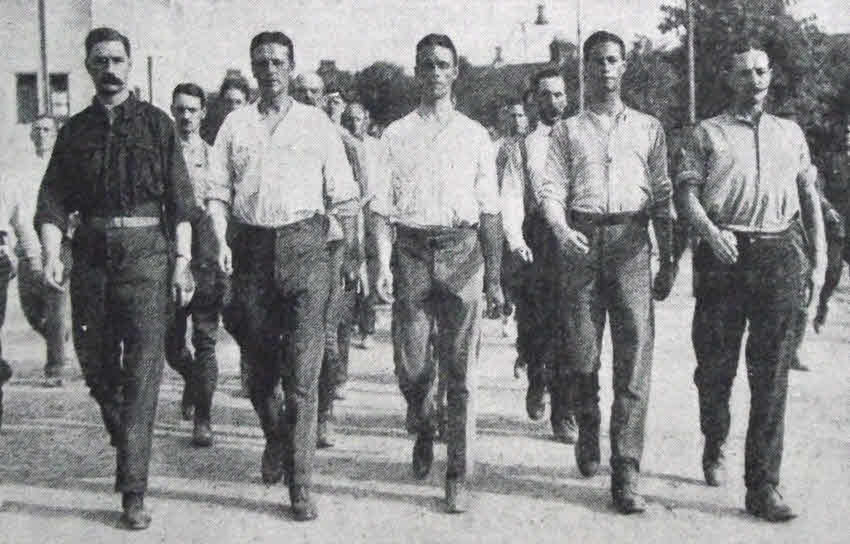
Men enlisting for the 2KEH, on parade.

A memorial to those members of the regiment who died in the war was erected on the wall in the Royal Colonial Institute at Charing Cross in 1925 but did not survive the demolition of that building in 1934.

== See also ==
- County of London Yeomanry
- King Edward's Horse
