= Homage to Catalonia =

1938 memoir by George Orwell

- Author: George Orwell
- Language: English
- Genre: Non-fiction, political
- Publisher: Secker and Warburg (London)
- Publication date: 25 April 1938
- Publication place: United Kingdom
- Media type: Print (hardback & paperback)
- Pages: 368 (paperback); 248 (hardback)
- OCLC: 2600839
- Preceded by: The Road to Wigan Pier
- Followed by: Coming Up for Air

Homage to Catalonia is a memoir and the sixth book by English writer George Orwell published in 1938, in which he accounts his personal experiences and observations while fighting in the Spanish Civil War.

Covering the period between December 1936 and June 1937, Orwell recounts Catalonia's revolutionary fervor during his training in Barcelona, his boredom on the front lines in Aragon, his involvement in the interfactional May Days conflict back in Barcelona on leave, him getting shot in the throat back on the front lines, and his escape to France after the POUM was declared an illegal organization. The war was one of the defining events of his political outlook and a significant part of what led him to write in 1946, "Every line of serious work that I have written since 1936 has been written, directly or indirectly, against totalitarianism and for democratic socialism, as I understand it."

Initial reception was mixed, often depending on whether the reviewers' analyses of events aligned with Orwell's. Praise was reserved for his vivid depiction of life on the frontlines, while criticisms were aimed at his denunciations of the Republican government and Communist Party. It received a second wave of popularity during the 1950s, after the popularity of Orwell's novels Animal Farm (1945) and Nineteen Eighty-Four (1949) attracted a reevaluation of the book, with American liberal intellectuals presenting it as a work of anti-communism. During the 1960s, figures in the New Left again recontextualised it through the lens of revolutionary socialism, opposed both to Marxism-Leninism and capitalism, which attracted another wave of criticism from figures in the Communist Party of Great Britain (CPGB). Since the Spanish transition to democracy, some historians have cautioned against reading Orwell's first-person account as a representation of the conflict as a whole.

== Background ==
=== Historical context ===
During the 19th century, a motif known as the two Spains began to emerge in Spanish literature, in which writers such as Mariano José de Larra depicted a polarised Spain, divided into progressive and conservative factions. When the Second Spanish Republic was established in 1931, it came at a time when Europe was experiencing a rise in far-right politics, including fascism and Nazism. The Spanish Civil War broke out on 18 July 1936, when the Nationalist faction of the Spanish Army, supported by Fascist Italy and Nazi Germany, launched a coup d'état against the elected government of the Spanish Republic.

General map of the Spanish Civil War (1936–39).

As the Republican government was initially paralysed by the coup, resistance to it was organised by the general population in cities throughout the country, culminating in a social revolution that saw anarchist and socialist workers bring Spain's industrial economy under social ownership. By the autumn of 1936, workers' militias had defeated the Nationalist coup in Madrid, Barcelona and Valencia, forming a frontline through Aragon and New Castile that divided Spain into Republican and Nationalist zones. The Republican faction consisted of several political parties and trade unions, of varying political positions and influence, including: the National Confederation of Labour (CNT), an anarchist trade union which controlled the Barcelona metropolitan area; the Workers' Party of Marxist Unification (POUM), a small Trotskyist party; the General Union of Workers (UGT), a socialist trade union which predominated in Bilbao and Madrid; and the Spanish Socialist Workers' Party (PSOE) and Communist Party of Spain (PCE), which had amalgamated together in Catalonia into the Unified Socialist Party of Catalonia (PSUC).

The French government of Léon Blum and the British government of Neville Chamberlain adopted a policy of non-intervention, ostensibly to prevent any escalation, but also motivated by their fear of revolutionary sentiments spreading outside of Spain. While the Nationalists were supported militarily from the Nazis and fascists, the Republicans found themselves economically and diplomatically isolated, forcing them to purchase military equipment from the Soviet Union. In order to combat the rise of fascism and defend the social revolution, thousands of volunteers went to Spain and joined the Republican militias.

=== Biographical context ===
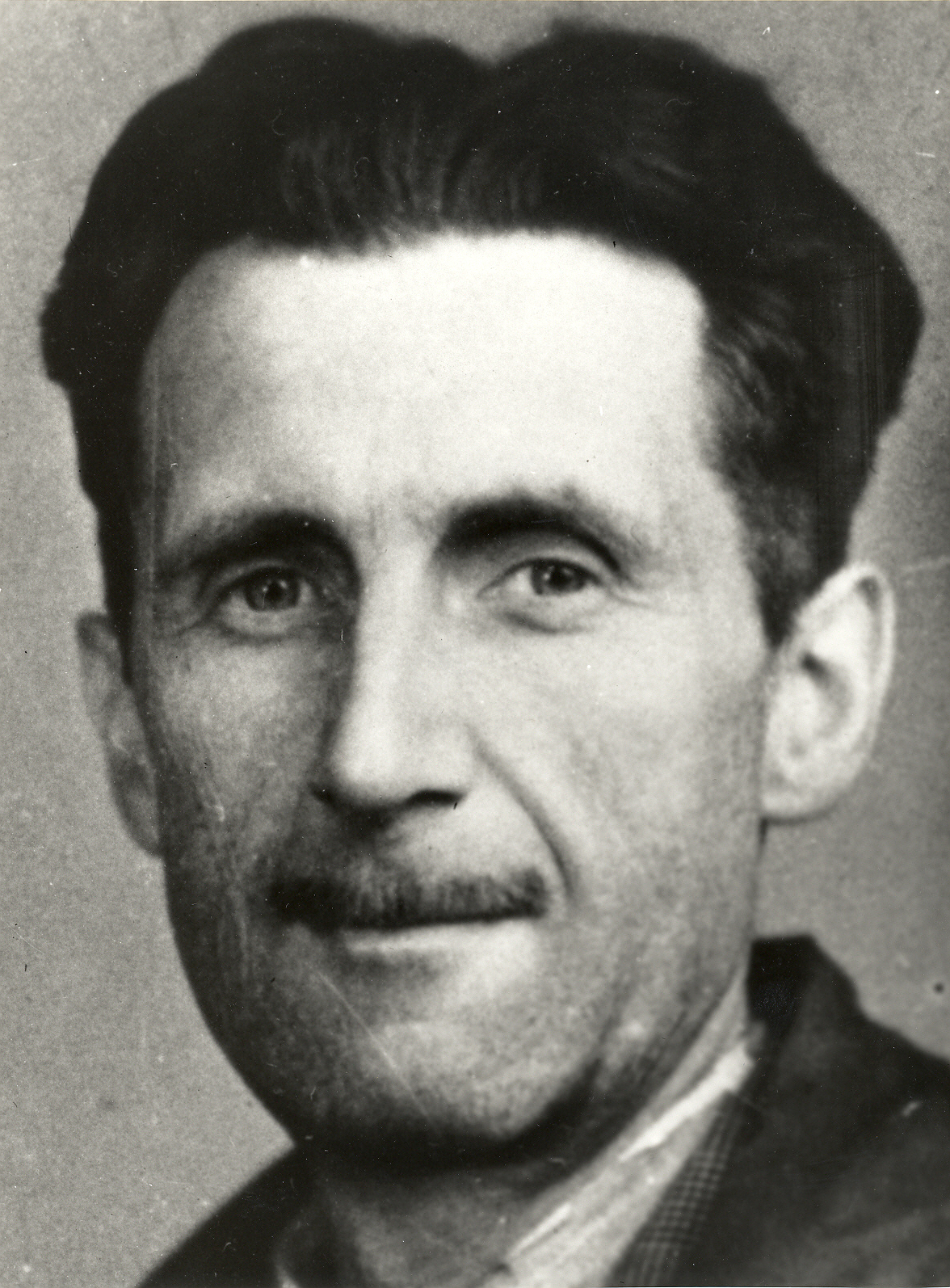
George Orwell, the author of Homage to Catalonia, who travelled to Spain to fight in the Spanish Civil War

George Orwell was born in 1903, in the Indian city of Motihari, which was at the time under the rule of the British Raj. He was raised by his mother in England and returned to Asia at the age of 19, in order to join the Imperial Police in Burma. There he was exposed first-hand to the material realities of imperialism, which became the subject of his first novel Burmese Days, published in 1934. Upon his return to Europe, he spent years living in poverty in the cities of London and Paris, an experience which formed the basis for his first full-length work Down and Out in Paris and London.

Throughout the 1930s, Orwell had become concerned about the rise of fascism in Europe and wanted to take action to oppose it. Although he did not speak or write about Spain during the first months of the conflict, so his thought process on the matter is not known, by the autumn of 1936, he had decided to go to Spain. In order to obtain a passport that would permit his entry into Spain, he initially went to the headquarters of the Communist Party of Great Britain (CPGB) in London's King Street. When the party's leader, Harry Pollitt, asked if he would join the International Brigades, Orwell replied that he wanted to see for himself what was happening first. After Pollitt refused to help, Orwell contacted the Independent Labour Party (ILP). They accredited Orwell as a correspondent for their weekly paper, the New Leader, which provided Orwell the means to go legitimately to Spain. Orwell received a letter of recommendation from the ILP's general secretary Fenner Brockway, who put him in touch with John McNair, the ILP's representative in Barcelona and an affiliate of the POUM, a Catalan party of the anti-Stalinist left.

After putting the finishing touches on his book The Road to Wigan Pier, he departed for Spain on 23 December 1936. He briefly stopped in Paris, where he met up with his friend Henry Miller, before he continued his journey south by train, finally crossing over the France–Spain border and arriving in Barcelona by the end of the year.

Upon arriving in Spain, Orwell is reported to have told McNair that he had come to Spain to join the militia to fight against Fascism. While McNair also describes Orwell as expressing a desire to write "some articles" for the New Statesman and Nation with an intention "to stir working-class opinion in Britain and France", when presented the opportunity to write, Orwell told him writing "was quite secondary and his main reason for coming was to fight against Fascism." McNair took Orwell to the POUM (Catalan: Partit Obrer d'Unificació Marxista; English: Workers' Party of Marxist Unification), an anti-Stalinist communist party.

By Orwell's own admission, it was somewhat by chance that he joined the POUM: "I knew that I was serving in something called the POUM. (I had only joined the POUM militia rather than any other because I happened to arrive in Barcelona with ILP papers), but I did not realize that there were serious differences between the political parties." He later notes, "As far as my purely personal preferences went I would have liked to join the Anarchists." He also nearly joined Communist International's International Column midway through his tour because he thought they were likeliest to send him to Madrid, where he wanted to join the action.

== Chapter summaries ==
The appendices in this summary correspond to chapters 5 and 11 in editions that do not include appendices. Orwell felt these chapters, as journalistic accounts of the political situation in Spain, were out of place in the midst of the narrative and should be moved so that readers could ignore them if they wished.

=== Chapter one ===
Orwell describes the atmosphere of Barcelona in December 1936. "The anarchists were still in virtual control of Catalonia and the revolution was still in full swing ... It was the first time that I had ever been in a town where the working class was in the saddle ... every wall was scrawled with the hammer and sickle ... every shop and café had an inscription saying that it had been collectivized." Further to this, "The Anarchists" (referring to the Spanish CNT and FAI) were "in control", tipping was prohibited by workers themselves, and servile forms of speech, such as "Señor" or "Don", were abandoned. At the Lenin Barracks (formerly the Lepanto Barracks), militiamen were given instruction in the form of "parade-ground drill of the most antiquated, stupid kind; right turn, left turn, about turn, marching at attention in column of threes and all the rest of that useless nonsense, which I had learned when I was fifteen years old".

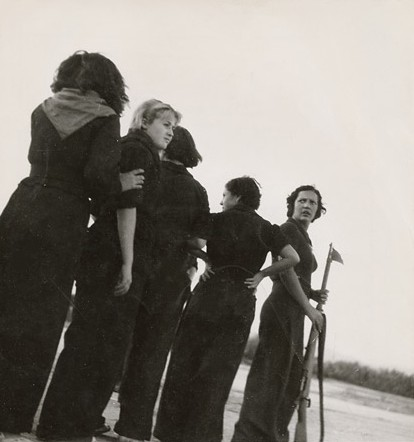
"There were still women serving in the militias, though not very many. In the early battles they had fought side by side with the men as a matter of course." (Barcelona, 1936. Militiawomen on beach near Barcelona. Photo: Gerda Taro).

He describes the deficiencies of the POUM workers' militia, the absence of weapons, the recruits mostly boys of sixteen or seventeen ignorant of the meaning of war, half-complains about the sometimes frustrating tendency of Spaniards to put things off until "mañana" (tomorrow), notes his struggles with Spanish (or more usually, the local use of Catalan). He praises the generosity of the Catalan working class. Orwell leads to the next chapter by describing the "conquering-hero stuff"—parades through the streets and cheering crowds—that the militiamen experienced at the time he was sent to the Aragón front.

=== Chapter two ===
In January 1937, Orwell's centuria arrives in Alcubierre, just behind the line fronting Zaragoza. He sketches the squalor of the region's villages and the "Fascist deserters" indistinguishable from themselves. On the third day rifles are handed out. Orwell's "was a German Mauser dated 1896 ... it was corroded and past praying for." The chapter ends on his centuria's arrival at trenches near Zaragoza and the first time a bullet nearly hit him. To his dismay, instinct made him duck.

=== Chapter three ===
In the hills around Zaragoza, Orwell experiences the "mingled boredom and discomfort of stationary warfare," the mundaneness of a situation in which "each army had dug itself in and settled down on the hill-tops it had won." He praises the Spanish militias for their relative social equality, for their holding of the front while the army was trained in the rear, and for the "democratic 'revolutionary' type of discipline ... more reliable than might be expected." "'Revolutionary' discipline depends on political consciousness—on an understanding of why orders must be obeyed; it takes time to diffuse this, but it also takes time to drill a man into an automaton on the barrack-square".

Throughout the chapter Orwell describes the various shortages and problems at the front—firewood ("We were between two and three thousand feet above sea-level, it was mid winter and the cold was unspeakable"), food, candles, tobacco, and adequate munitions—as well as the danger of accidents inherent in a badly trained and poorly armed group of soldiers.

=== Chapter four ===
After some three weeks at the front, Orwell and the other English militiaman in his unit, Williams, join a contingent of fellow Englishmen sent out by the Independent Labour Party to a position at Monte Oscuro, within sight of Zaragoza. "Perhaps the best of the bunch was Bob Smillie—the grandson of the famous miners' leader—who afterwards died such an evil and meaningless death in Valencia". In this new position he witnesses the sometimes propagandistic shouting between the Rebel and Loyalist trenches and hears of the fall of Málaga. "... every man in the militia believed that the loss of Malaga was due to treachery. It was the first talk I had heard of treachery or divided aims. It set up in my mind the first vague doubts about this war in which, hitherto, the rights and wrongs had seemed so beautifully simple." In February, he is sent with the other POUM militiamen 50 miles to make a part of the army besieging Huesca; he mentions the running joke phrase, "Tomorrow we'll have coffee in Huesca," attributed to a general commanding the Government troops who, months earlier, made one of many failed assaults on the town.

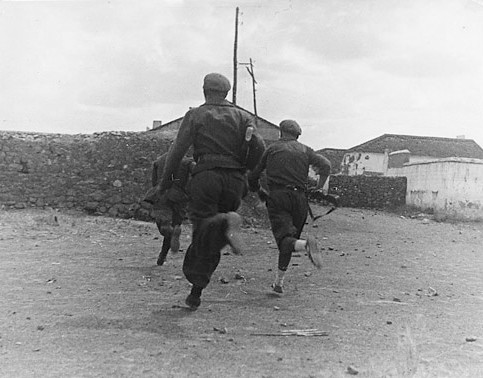
"I knew that I was serving in something called the POUM. (I had only joined the POUM militia rather than any other because I happened to arrive in Barcelona with ILP papers), but I did not realise that there were serious differences between the political parties." (Republican soldiers, June 1937. Photo: Gerda Taro).

=== Chapter five (orig. ch. 6) ===
Orwell complains that on the eastern side of Huesca, where he was stationed, nothing ever seemed to happen—except the onslaught of spring, and, with it, lice. He was in a ("so-called") hospital at Monflorite for ten days at the end of March 1937 with a poisoned hand that had to be lanced and put in a sling. He describes rats that "really were as big as cats, or nearly" (in Orwell's novel Nineteen Eighty-Four, the protagonist Winston Smith has a phobia of rats that Orwell himself shared to a lesser degree). He makes reference to the lack of "religious feeling, in the orthodox sense," and that the Catholic Church was, "to the Spanish people, at any rate in Catalonia and Aragon, a racket, pure and simple. And possibly Christian belief was replaced to some extent by Anarchism". The latter portion of the chapter briefly details various operations in which Orwell took part: silently advancing the Loyalist frontline by night, for example.

=== Chapter six (orig. ch. 7) ===
Orwell takes part in a "holding attack" on Huesca, designed to draw the Nationalist troops away from an Anarchist attack on "the Jaca road." He suspects two of the bombs he threw may have killed their targets, but he cannot be sure. They capture the position and pull back with captured rifles and ammunition, but Orwell laments that they fled too hurriedly to bring back a telescope they had discovered, which Orwell sees as more useful than any weapons.

=== Chapter seven (orig. ch. 8) ===
Orwell shares memories of the 115 days he spent on the war front, and its influence on his political ideas, "... the prevailing mental atmosphere was that of Socialism ... the ordinary class-division of society had disappeared to an extent that is almost unthinkable in the money-tainted air of England ... the effect was to make my desire to see Socialism established much more actual than it had been before." By the time he left Spain, he had become a "convinced democratic Socialist." The chapter ends with Orwell's arrival in Barcelona on the afternoon of 26 April 1937. "And after that the trouble began."

=== Chapter eight (orig. ch. 9) ===
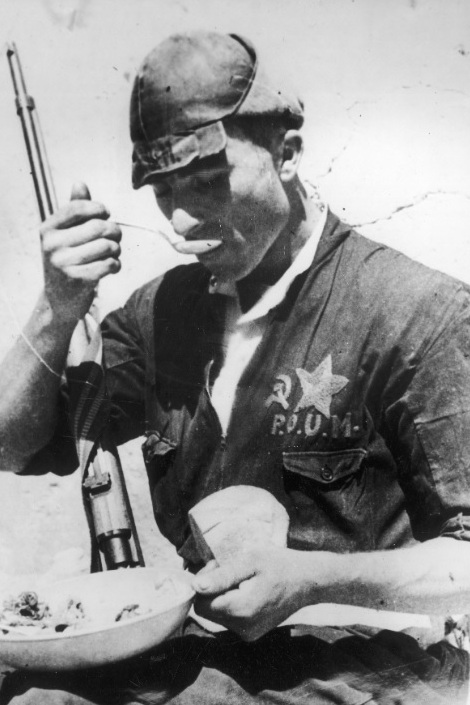
POUM militiaman

Orwell details noteworthy changes in the social and political atmosphere of Barcelona when he returns after three months at the front. He describes a lack of revolutionary atmosphere and the class division that he had thought would not reappear, i.e., with visible division between rich and poor and the return of servile language. Orwell had been determined to leave the POUM, and confesses here that he "would have liked to join the Anarchists," but instead sought a recommendation to join the International Column, so that he could go to the Madrid front. The latter half of this chapter is devoted to describing the conflict between the anarchist CNT and the socialist Unión General de Trabajadores (UGT) and the resulting cancellation of the May Day demonstration and the build-up to the street fighting of the "Barcelona May Days". "It was the antagonism between those who wished the revolution to go forward and those who wished to check or prevent it—ultimately, between Anarchists and Communists."

=== Chapter nine (orig. ch. 10) ===
Orwell relates his involvement in the "May Days"' Barcelona street fighting that began on 3 May when the Government Assault Guards tried to take the Telephone Exchange from the CNT workers who controlled it. For his part, Orwell acted as part of the POUM, guarding a POUM-controlled building. Although he realises that he is fighting on the side of the working class, Orwell describes his dismay at coming back to Barcelona on leave from the front only to get mixed up in street fighting. Assault Guards from Valencia arrive—"All of them were armed with brand-new rifles ... vastly better than the dreadful old blunderbusses we had at the front." The Stalinist-controlled Unified Socialist Party of Catalonia newspapers declare POUM to be a disguised Fascist organisation—"No one who was in Barcelona then, or for months later, will forget the horrible atmosphere produced by fear, suspicion, hatred, censored newspapers, crammed jails, enormous food queues, and prowling gangs of armed men." In his second appendix to the book, Orwell discusses the political issues at stake in the May 1937 Barcelona fighting, as he saw them at the time and later on, looking back.

=== Chapter ten (orig. ch. 12) ===
Orwell speculates on how the Spanish Civil War might turn out. Orwell predicts that the "tendency of the post-war Government ... is bound to be Fascistic."

He returns to the front, where he is shot through the throat by a sniper, an injury that takes him out of the war. After spending some time in a hospital in Lleida, he was moved to Tarragona where his wound was finally examined more than a week after he had left the front.

=== Chapter eleven (orig. ch. 13) ===
Orwell tells us of his various movements between hospitals in Siétamo, Barbastro, and Monzón while getting his discharge papers stamped, after being declared medically unfit. He returns to Barcelona only to find out from his wife that the POUM had been "suppressed": it had been declared illegal the very day he had left to obtain discharge papers and POUM members were being arrested without charge. "The attack on Huesca was beginning ... there must have been numbers of men who were killed without ever learning that the newspapers in the rear were calling them Fascists. This kind of thing is a little difficult to forgive." While his wife went back to the hotel, he sleeps that night in the ruins of a church; he cannot go back to his hotel because of the danger of arrest.

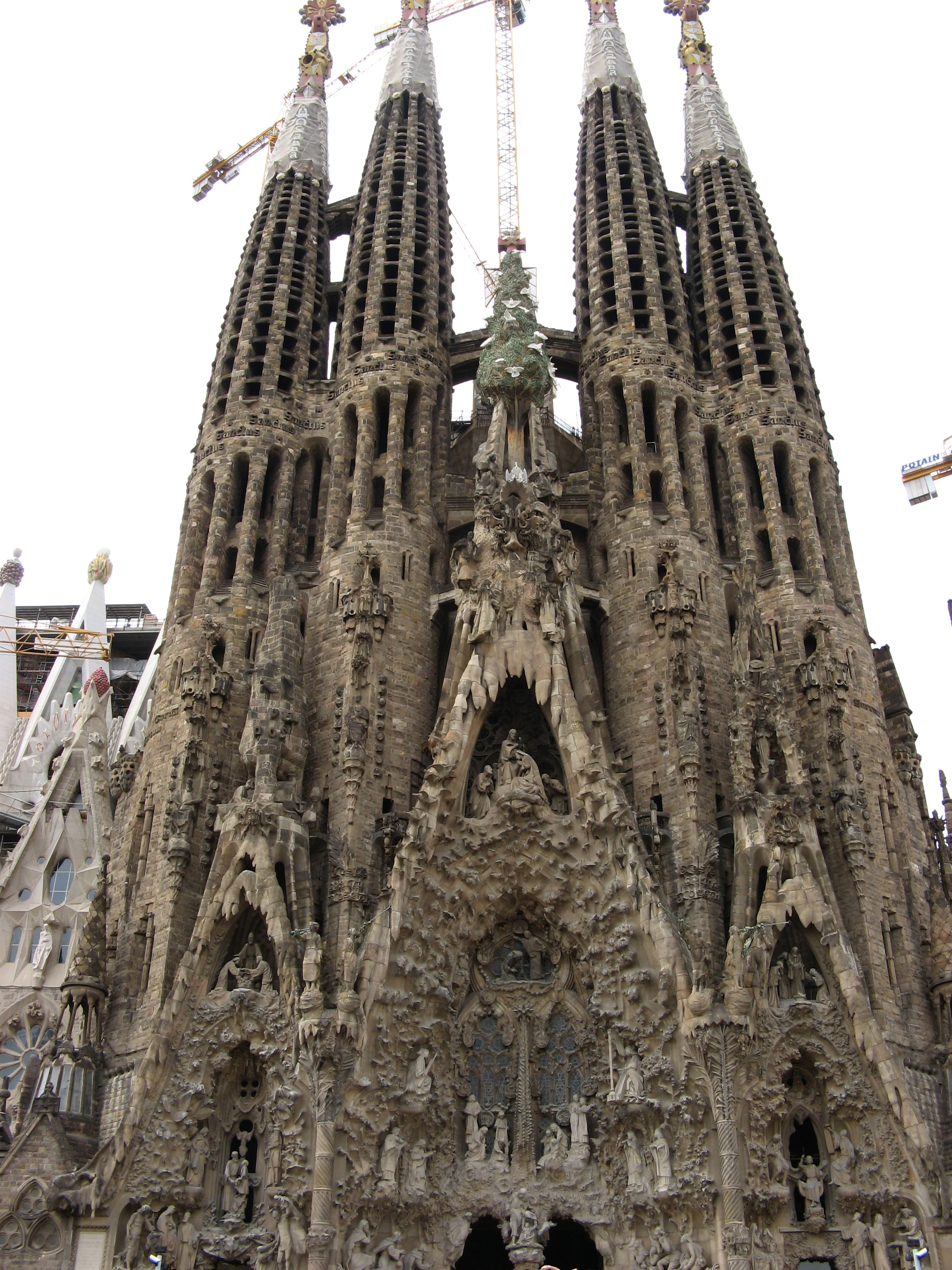
La Sagrada Família in 1980 "When Orwell speaks about the cathedral of Barcelona, he is talking in fact about La Sagrada Família temple, designed by Antoni Gaudí ..." "... I went to have a look at the cathedral—a modern cathedral, and one of the most hideous buildings in the world. It has four crenellated spires exactly the shape of hock bottles ... I think the Anarchists showed bad taste in not blowing it up ... though they did hang a red and black banner between its spires."(Ch. XII)

=== Chapter twelve (orig. ch. 14) ===
This chapter describes his visits accompanied by his wife to Georges Kopp, unit commander of the ILP Contingent while Kopp was held in a Spanish makeshift jail—"really the ground floor of a shop." Having done all he could to free Kopp, ineffectively and at great personal risk, Orwell decides to leave Spain. Crossing the Pyrenees frontier, he and his wife arrived in France "without incident".

=== Appendix one (orig. ch. 5) ===
Orwell explains the divisions within the Republican side: "On the one side the CNT-FAI, the POUM, and a section of the Socialists, standing for workers' control: on the other side the Right-wing Socialists, Liberals, and Communists, standing for centralized government and a militarized army." He also writes: "One of the dreariest effects of this war has been to teach me that the Left-wing press is every bit as spurious and dishonest as that of the Right."

=== Appendix two (orig. ch. 11) ===
An attempt to dispel some of the myths in the foreign press at the time (mostly the pro-Communist press) about the "May Days", the street fighting that took place in revolutionary Catalonia in early May 1937. This was between anarchists and POUM members, against Communist/government forces which sparked off when local police forces occupied the Telephone Exchange, which had until then been under the control of CNT workers. He relates the suppression of the POUM on 15–16 June 1937, gives examples of the Communist Press of the world—(Daily Worker, 21 June, "Spanish Trotskyists Plot With Franco"), indicates that Indalecio Prieto hinted, "fairly broadly to the delegation that the government could not afford to offend the Communist Party while the Russians were supplying arms." He quotes Julián Zugazagoitia, the Minister of the Interior; "We have received aid from Russia and have had to permit certain actions which we did not like."

== Publication history ==
=== Writing ===
Orwell wrote diaries, made press-cuttings, and took photographs during his time in Spain, but they were all stolen before he left. In May 1937, he wrote the publisher of his previous books saying, "I greatly hope I come out of this alive if only to write a book about it." According to his eventual publisher, "Homage was begun in February [1937] in the trenches, written on scraps, the backs of envelopes, toilet paper. The written material was sent to Barcelona to McNair's office, where his wife Eileen Blair, working as a volunteer, typed it out section by section. Slowly it grew into a sizable parcel. McNair kept it in his own room."

Upon escaping across the French border in June 1937, he stopped at the first post office available to telegram the National Statesman, asking if it would like a first-hand article. The offer was accepted but the article, "Eyewitness in Barcelona", was rejected by editor Kingsley Martin on grounds that his writing "could cause trouble" (it was picked up by Controversy). In the months after leaving Spain, Orwell wrote a number of essays on the war, notably "Spilling the Spanish Beans" and a praiseful review of Franz Borkenau's The Spanish Cockpit.

Writing from his cottage at Wallington, Hertfordshire, he finished around New Year's Day 1938.

=== First edition ===
After Orwell had returned to England in 1937, his pitch for the memoir was quickly turned down by his own publisher Victor Gollancz, who worried that its publication might harm the cause of anti-fascism. Orwell concluded that Gollancz was "part of the Communism-racket" and sought out a different publisher; he was recommended by ILP secretary Fenner Brockway to Frederic Warburg, a publisher associated with the anti-Stalinist left, who agreed to a contract with Orwell. In September, a deal was signed for an advance of £150 (equivalent to £9,000 in 2025). By January 1938, Orwell had completed the book and, on 25 April 1938, Secker & Warburg published it under the title Homage to Catalonia. Orwell remarked to Jack Common that they had not been able to think of a better title.

The book was initially commercially unsuccessful, selling only 683 copies (out of 1,500) in its first 6 months, with many copies of its initial print run remaining unsold at the time of Orwell's death in 1950. Orwell himself had wondered if the book had been boycotted by the British press, while publisher Fredric Warburg himself believed that the book had been "ignored and hectored into failure". "Ten years ago it was almost impossible to get anything printed in favour of Communism; today it is almost impossible to get anything printed in favour of Anarchism or 'Trotskyism'," Orwell wrote bitterly in 1938.

=== Later editions ===
Following the success of Orwell's later books, Animal Farm and Nineteen Eighty-Four, it was posthumously recognised as a "lost classic" of the now-famous author. The book received a second wave of sales after the first American edition was published by Harcourt Brace, in 1952, with an introduction from literary critic Lionel Trilling. In Britain, Secker & Warburg published a new edition of the book in 1951; publication was taken over by Penguin Books in 1962 and it has never fallen out of print since then. The book received a third wave of sales during the late 1960s, buoyed by interest from the period's counterculture and the New Left. Historian Paul Preston speculated in 2017 that Homage had become the highest selling and most read book about the civil war.

These later editions incorporated revisions requested by Orwell himself, in order to correct some mistakes he had made in the first edition and to rearrange the chapter sequence so the "general information" about political context was moved to appendices. In 1986, Peter Davison published an edition with a few footnotes based on Orwell's own footnotes found among his papers after he died.

=== Translations ===
The only translation published in Orwell's lifetime was into Italian, in December 1948. A French translation by Yvonne Davet—with whom Orwell corresponded, commenting on her translation and providing explanatory notes—in 1938–39, was not published until 1955, five years after Orwell's death.

Orwell's Homage finally received publication in Spain during the early 1970s, although much its content was suppressed and distorted by the Francoist censors. It received a second Spanish edition in 1978, after the approval of the Spanish Constitution, but it was not until 2007 that an uncensored, comprehensive edition of the book was published in Spain.

== Reception ==
=== Contemporary reviews (1930s–1940s) ===
Initial reception of Homage were mixed and few in number, with reviews being divided between supporters and opponents of Orwell's analysis of the conflict.

Many positive reviews of the book came from Orwell's friends and political allies, such as Geoffrey Gorer and John McNair respectively. Veterans of World War I, such as Herbert Read and Gerald Brenan, praised the book for its vivid depiction of life on the frontlines of a war. Read commented that, except for a lack of artillery bombardment, Orwell's "physical miseries" in Aragon seemed worse than his own in Ypres; while Brenan related to his descriptions of war's "immense boredom and its immense charm, the sense of being a human being again among other human beings." Irene Rathbone likewise wrote that he had captured the feelings of the men that fought in the World War, commenting that he was "in essence" a part of that same generation. Other positive reviews came from staunch anti-communists in Conservative and Catholic circles, who had opposed the Spanish Republic from the outset. A review for the conservative magazine The Spectator concluded that the "dismal record of intrigue, injustice, incompetence, quarrelling, lying communist propaganda, police spying, illegal imprisonment, filth and disorder" was evidence that the Spanish Republic had deserved to fall. The book also received a positive review from Austrian journalist Franz Borkenau, who wrote that Homage and his own book The Spanish Cockpit formed a complete picture of the Spanish Revolution of 1936.

A mixed review for The Listener described the book as a "muddle-headed and inaccurate" account of the war and criticised it for its positive depiction of the POUM, while also praising Orwell's vivid description of "the horror and filth, the futility and comedy, and even the beauty of war." Another mixed review was supplied by V. S. Pritchett who called Orwell naïve about Spain but added that "no one excels him in bringing to the eyes, ears and nostrils the nasty ingredients of fevered situations; and I would recommend him warmly to all who are concerned about the realities of personal experience in a muddled cause".

In a negative review for the Communist Party of Great Britain's newspaper, The Daily Worker, John Langdon-Davies wrote that "the value of the book is that it gives an honest picture of the sort of mentality that toys with revolutionary romanticism but shies violently at revolutionary discipline. It should be read as a warning." Anti-fascist poet Nancy Cunard later wrote that the book was riddled with "perfidious inaccuracies" and came away from it thinking Orwell was a Trotskyist, wondering "what kind of damage he has been doing, or trying to do, in Spain". Other negative reviews were published in The Tablet and The Times Literary Supplement.

British historian Tom Buchanan believed that, at the time of its initial publication, Orwell had "delivered a message that was too unwelcome, and at too late a stage in the war, to stimulate the kind of debate that he may have wished to initiate." Most of the British left believed that the Spanish Civil War had been a simple conflict between democracy and fascism, ignoring the role of revolutionaries on the Republican side, which Orwell himself believed had made them complacent regarding the situation. In late 1937, when Nancy Cunard began soliciting opinions from British authors on which side of the conflict they supported, Orwell responded that he refused to write about "defending democracy", retorting that the Spanish Republican government had forced fascism onto Spanish workers "under the pretext of resisting Fascism". Kingsley Martin subsequently refused to publish any of Orwell's "anti-government propaganda" in the New Statesman, which led Orwell himself to conclude that he was a victim of censorship.

=== Anti-communist reevaluation (1950s) ===
The success of Orwell's novels, and his death in 1950, brought Homage back into the limelight as people began to reassess the effect that his experiences in Spain had on his work. The release of several memoirs by Spanish ex-communists also triggered a reevaluation of the prescience of Orwell's criticisms of Communism, with Valentín González commenting that his writings had been "confirmed". In an obituary on Orwell, British literary critic V. S. Pritchett commented that "Don Quixote saw the poker face of Communism". In June 1950, the anti-communist writer Stephen Spender praised Homage as "one of the most serious indictments of Communism which has been written", remarking that the book demonstrated that all ideologies were capable of terrible things, if they are not taken together with "a scrupulous regard for the sacredness of the truth of an individual life." He commented that: "politically, the liquidation of the POUM was not an event of great importance; humanly speaking, it was a greater failure for the Republic even than the defeat." Spender even argued that Homage was a better book than Nineteen Eighty-Four, as it depicted "real horrors and real betrayals".

Upon the publication of the book's first American edition in 1952, American literary critic Lionel Trilling exalted Orwell as a "secular saint", who was wholly committed to truth and journalistic objectivity. Historian John Rodden argued that Trilling's introduction to Homage was instrumental in bringing the book to prominence, as the American intelligentsia of the period had been in search of a "moral and political condemnation" of Spanish communism. American reviews re-conceived the book as a key piece of context for understanding Orwell's later work, presenting it as about "the making of an anti-totalitarian". Some understood it as a demonstration of communist tactics for seizing power, placing it within the post-WWII context of the formation of the Eastern Bloc and the People's Republic of China. American journalist Herbert Matthews was sharply critical of the book's re-contextualisation by Americans during the Cold War, arguing that its importance as an account of the Spanish Civil War had been eclipsed by its status as an anti-communist exposé.

=== Socialist reevaluation and communist backlash (1960s–1970s) ===
Another reevaluation of Homage came during the 1960s, as the emerging counterculture and the New Left brought a new generation of readers to pick up the book. The anti-communist tendencies of the 1950s, which had buried Orwell's positive depiction of revolutionary socialism, were partly reversed and Orwell was again reconceived as a predecessor of Che Guevara. In 1971, the Welsh socialist scholar Raymond Williams commented that Homage had been reevaluated, in the context of the suppression of the Hungarian Revolution of 1956 and the Protests of 1968, as taking a position in favour of revolutionary socialism and opposed to both capitalism and Marxism-Leninism. This position was exemplified in Noam Chomsky's book American Power and the New Mandarins, in which the author used Homage to directly compare the Spanish revolution with Vietnamese resistance to US intervention, arguing that neither complied with the "liberal dogma" of the American intelligentsia. He speculated that the book's status as a symbol of 1950s anti-communism would have been "of little comfort to the author". Raymond Carr praised Orwell in 1971 for being "determined to set down the truth as he saw it." In his 1971 memoir, Herbert Matthews of The New York Times declared, "The book did more to blacken the Loyalist cause than any work written by enemies of the Second Republic."

The revival in the book's popularity also triggered indignation from figures in the CPGB, which had never forgiven Orwell for it. In 1967, the historian Frank Jellinek expressed regret that the book had been exploited by anti-communists such as James Burnham and that it had brought the suppression of the POUM, which he called a "fairly minor piece of wartime expediency", to a prominent place within historiography of the civil war. In the late 1970s, British communist veterans of the war, such as Thomas Murray and Frank Graham, denounced the book respectively as a "weapon" of the anti-Stalinist left and as a slander against the International Brigades. In 1984, CPGB politician and former commander of the International Brigades, Bill Alexander, accused Orwell of lacking anti-fascist sentiments and called the book an "establishment" denigration of the "real issues" of anti-fascism. That same year, Lawrence and Wishart published Inside the Myth, a collection of essays from authors hostile to Orwell, which John Newsinger described as "an obvious attempt to do as much damage to his reputation as possible". To Tom Buchanan, the sustained Communist campaign against Homage had been "so wrongheaded and ill-informed that it has probably, if anything, bolstered Orwell's reputation." He concluded that the legacy of the book, which cemented the repression of the POUM in popular historiography and damaged the reputation of the Communist Party, revealed the potential that single books can have to leave their mark on history.

Nevertheless, the revolutionary conception of Homage continued through the subsequent decades, with British film-maker Ken Loach notably adapting the book into his 1995 film Land and Freedom. Tom Buchanan comments that the film may not have been received as well if previous generations had not been primed to view the Spanish Civil War through the lens of "the Revolution betrayed". Buchanan was critical of the far-left's adoption of the book, pointing out that Orwell had never fully agreed with the POUM's politics and that his view of revolutionary Spain "ignit[ing] the passions of workers around the world" had been naïve, given the prevalence of dictatorship at the time. He also commented that Orwell's revolutionary politics had been "unconvincing" and only a brief phase of his political development, which evolved and changed following his publication of Homage, as evidenced by his more moderate reflection in his 1942 essay "Looking Back on the Spanish War".

=== Historiographical evaluation (1970s–present) ===
When histories of the civil war first started to be published, historians generally disregarded Homage as a primary source. In his 1962 book The Spanish Civil War, English historian Hugh Thomas wrote that, while he thought Homage was a well-written memoir that was "perceptive about war", he also considered it to be misleading about the events of the war. He thought that Orwell had misjudged the war by believing that revolutionary idealism alone was capable of achieving victory; Thomas himself believed that the only way that the Republic could have won the war was through a process of centralisation and militarisation, backed by the Soviet Union. Tom Buchanan himself disputed Thomas' assessment that Homage was "misleading" on the war, so long as it was not considered a description of the conflict as a whole. Paul Preston likewise cautioned against taking the book as an "overview of the civil war, which it is not". In contrast, Homage has also contributed to a historiographical trend that centred the internal conflict within the Republican faction, exemplified by the work of Burnett Bolloten.

A revival of interest in the Spanish Civil War was later ignited by the Spanish transition to democracy in the 1970s, as a new generation of historians began studying the conflict and Orwell's own account of it, which received increasing amounts of scrutiny over his interpretation of the events. Gabriel Jackson wrote that Orwell had understood the civil war only as an analogue to the situation in Europe and lacked an understanding of the local political context in Spain. Michael Seidman argued that Orwell's depiction of the "working-class paradise" in Barcelona was questionable, as he had only been accounting for the convinced militants and not the "indifference" of many individual workers. Helen Graham pointed out how the internecine conflicts witnessed by Orwell had predated the civil war and Soviet intervention in the conflict, arguing against the "Cold War parable of an alien Stalinism which 'injected' conflict into Spanish Republican politics", although her analysis of the consequences of the May Days ultimately aligned with Orwell's.

In his own analysis of the book's effect on historiography, Tom Buchanan found that research on the conflict had not entirely disqualified Homage, but had instead emphasised it as a "snapshot of a complex political situation" taken by an outsider. Although Orwell himself warned readers to be aware of his own biases, mistakes and distortions, even engaging in self-deprecation over his own lack of knowledge of Spanish history and culture, Buchanan worried that people whose only insight into the conflict was Orwell's book would "receive a very unbalanced picture of the conflict as a whole." Buchanan concluded that the "very real danger" presented by the book was that it had been recontextualised, from an individual's personal account, into a book that was seen as representative of the civil war as a whole.

== Aftermath ==
Within weeks of leaving Spain, a deposition (discovered in 1989) was presented to the Tribunal for Espionage & High Treason, Valencia, charging the Orwells with 'rabid Trotskyism' and being agents of the POUM. The trial of the leaders of the POUM and of Orwell (in his absence) took place in Barcelona, in October and November 1938. Observing events from French Morocco, Orwell wrote that they were "only a by-product of the Russian Trotskyist trials and from the start every kind of lie, including flagrant absurdities, has been circulated in the Communist press."

Georges Kopp, deemed "quite likely" shot in the book's final chapter, was released in December 1938.

Barcelona fell to Franco's forces on 26 January 1939, and on 1 April 1939, the last of the Republican forces surrendered.

=== Effect on Orwell ===
==== Health ====
Orwell never knew the source of his tuberculosis, from complications of which he died in 1950. However, in 2018, researchers studying bacteria on his letters announced that there was a "very high probability" that Orwell contracted the disease in a Spanish hospital.

==== Politics ====
Orwell reflected that he "had felt what socialism could be like" and, according to biographer Gordon Bowker, "Orwell never did abandon his socialism: if anything, his Spanish experience strengthened it." In a letter to Cyril Connolly, written on 8 June 1937, Orwell said, "At last [I] really believe in Socialism, which I never did before". A decade later he wrote: "Every line of serious work that I have written since 1936 has been written, directly or indirectly, against totalitarianism and for democratic Socialism, as I understand it."

Orwell's experiences, culminating in his and his wife Eileen O'Shaughnessy's narrow escape from the communist purges in Barcelona in June 1937, greatly increased his sympathy for the POUM and, while not affecting his moral and political commitment to socialism, made him a lifelong anti-Stalinist.

After reviewing Koestler's bestselling Darkness at Noon, Orwell decided that fiction was the best way to describe totalitarianism. He soon wrote Animal Farm, "his scintillating 1944 satire on Stalinism".

=== Works inspired by the book ===
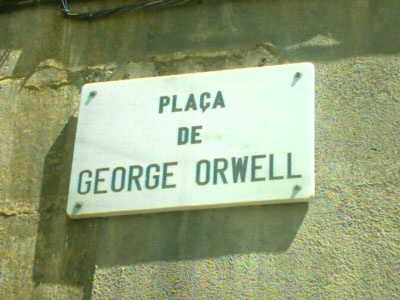
In 1996 a public square in Barcelona was named after Orwell.

Orwell himself went on to write a poem about the Italian militiaman he described in the book's opening pages. The poem was included in Orwell's 1942 essay "Looking Back on the Spanish War", published in New Road in 1943. The closing phrase of the poem, "No bomb that ever burst shatters the crystal spirit", was later taken by George Woodcock for the title of his Governor General's Award-winning critical study of Orwell and his work, The Crystal Spirit (1966).

In 1995 Ken Loach released the film Land and Freedom, heavily inspired by Homage to Catalonia.

Homage to Catalonia influenced Rebecca Solnit's second book, Savage Dreams.

== See also ==
- Anarchist Catalonia
- Bibliography of George Orwell
- For Whom the Bell Tolls
- The Spanish Cockpit
- ILP Contingent described in Homage to Catalonia
- Les grands cimetières sous la lune
- Spanish Revolution
- William Herrick 'an American Orwell', also disillusioned by Stalinism in Spain

== Bibliography ==
- Bowker, Gordon (2004) [2003]. "The Road to Morocco". George Orwell. Abacus. pp. 228–252. ISBN 0-349-11551-6.
- Buchanan, Tom (1 September 2002). "Three Lives of Homage to Catalonia". The Library. 3 (3): 302–314. doi:10.1093/library/3.3.302. ISSN 0024-2160.
- Caballero Aceituno, Yolanda (2005). "Homage to Catalonia revisited. From Vulnerability to resistance". Odisea: Revista de Estudios Ingleses (6). doi:10.25115/odisea.v0i6.171. hdl:10835/1313. ISSN 1578-3820.
- Martín Moruno, Dolores (2011). "Revisiting Spanish Memory: George Orwell's Homage to Catalonia" (PDF). Journal of Alternative Perspectives in the Social Sciences. 3 (1): 34–56. ISSN 1944-1088. Archived from the original (PDF) on 23 April 2020.
- Preston, Paul (2017). "Lights and Shadows in George Orwell's Homage to Catalonia". Bulletin of Spanish Studies: 1–29. doi:10.1080/14753820.2018.1388550. ISSN 1475-3820 – via Taylor & Francis.
