= Spilling the Spanish Beans =

Spilling the Spanish Beans is an article, in two parts, by George Orwell, that first appeared in the New English Weekly of 29 July and 2 September 1937.

== Background ==
Orwell travelled to Spain in December 1936, 'to gather material for newspaper articles etc..' and he had also, 'some vague idea of fighting if it seemed worthwhile.' He carried a letter from Fenner Brockway to Paris and dropped in on Henry Miller. He arrived in Barcelona on 26 December 1936 : " ... it was the first time I had ever been in a town where the working class was in the saddle... I recognised it immediately as a state of affairs worth fighting for.' He had arrived with Independent Labour Party (ILP) papers and the ILP was affiliated with the Workers' Party of Marxist Unification (POUM), an anti-Stalinist party. Its leader, Andrés Nin, had once been a close ally of Leon Trotsky. Nin had just been forced out of the Catalan government, a result of Communist influence which had grown in Spain since the first Russian supply ships had arrived in October 1936. In July 1936 the POUM paper La Batalla condemned the Moscow Show Trials - the Spanish Communists were complaining about the anarchists and 'Trotskyists'. In September general Alexander Orlov of the NKVD arrived in Madrid. Communist influence and Orlov's power began to extend itself throughout Republican Spain. Orwell did not know at this time that the POUM was quite separate from the Communist-dominated International Brigade. After Orwell had spent 'a day or so absorbing the atmosphere he told McNair [the ILP's Barcelona representative] that he had decided to enlist. A 20-year-old journalist, Victor Alba, from La Batalla had spent some time showing him the scenes of the July street fighting and given him the story of what had happened in Barcelona. From Barcelona Orwell was sent to Alcubierre on the Aragon Front.

== Argument of the essay ==
In the first part of the article Orwell argues that in the case of the Spanish Civil War, even more than pro-fascist newspapers like the Daily Mail, left-wing papers such as the News Chronicle and Daily Worker had "prevented the British public from grasping the real nature of the struggle."

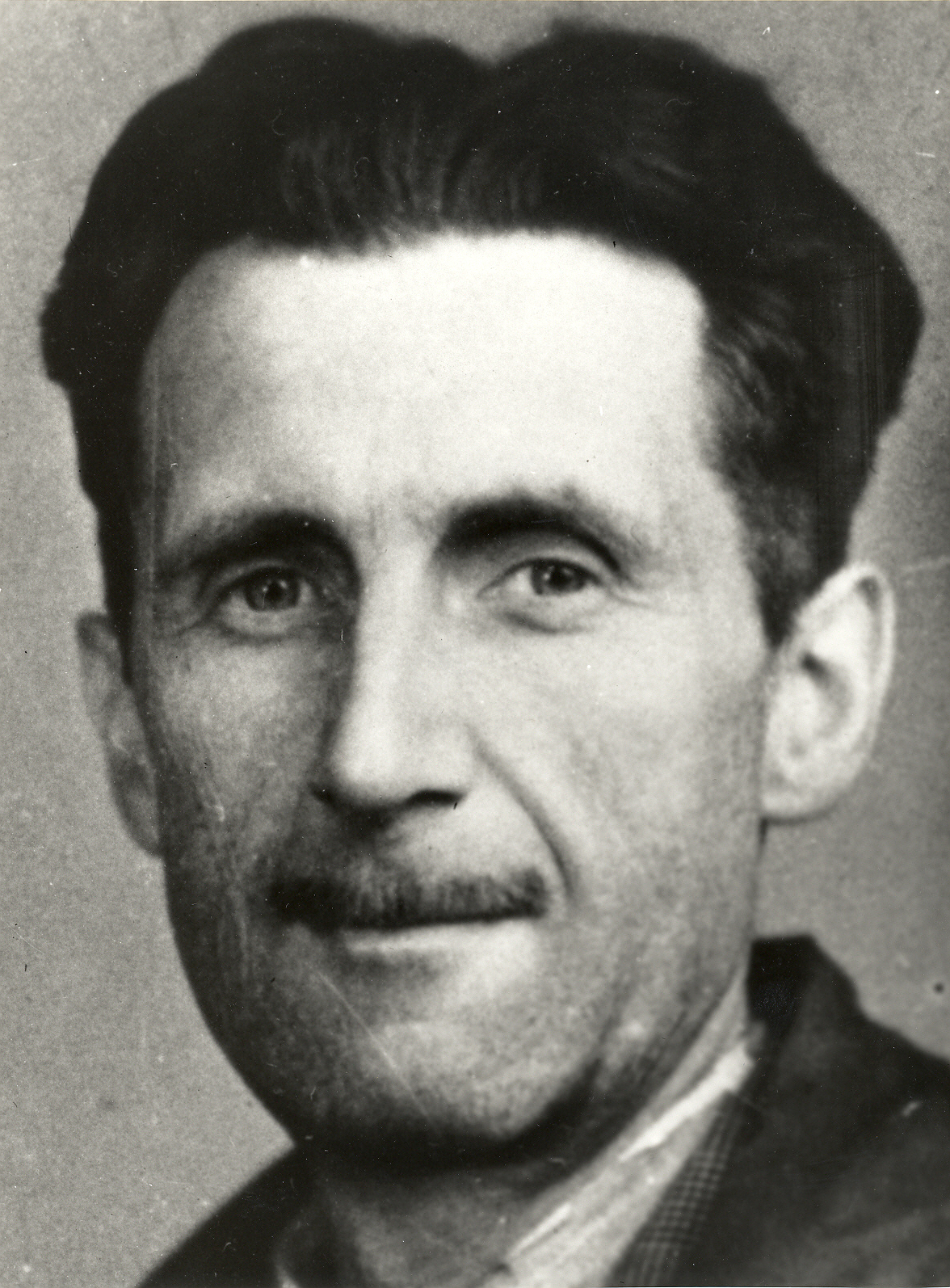
"... the Spanish government (including the semi-autonomous Catalan Government) is far more afraid of the revolution than of the Fascists."

Orwell describes the imprisoning of those whose opinions were too much to the left and that the people responsible for putting them there were the Communists: "The real struggle is between revolution and counter-revolution;... Communism is now a counter-revolutionary force;... using the whole of their powerful machinery to crush or discredit any party that shows signs of revolutionary tendencies." "In the face of Franco's foreign mercenaries [the Government] were obliged to turn to Russia for help, and though the quantity of arms supplied by Russia has been greatly exaggerated, the mere fact of their arrival brought the Communists into power... the Russians were able not only to get money for their weapons, but to extort terms as well. Put in their crudest form, the terms were: 'Crush the revolution or you get no more arms'... it may be, that the spectacle of a genuine revolution in Spain would rouse unwanted echoes in Russia."

In the second part of the essay Orwell describes the Communist propaganda that denounced 'Trotskyism' : "In Spain, anyone professing revolutionary Socialism is under suspicion of being a Trotskyist in the pay of Franco or Hitler." If the Communists had saved the Government from October 1936 onwards they had also, Orwell wrote, "succeeded in killing enthusiasm... it is significant that as early as January of this year [1937] voluntary recruiting had practically ceased."

== Difficulties finding a publisher ==
Orwell and his wife Eileen left Spain on 23 June 1937, escaping the Stalinist purges, and headed at first for the seaside for a holiday and went to Banyuls-sur-Mer. "Their holiday was not a success. Orwell found the place 'a bore and a disappointment'. It was chilly weather, a persistent wind blew off the sea, the water was dull and choppy.... Orwell could not help feeling that his time would be better spent in writing articles which would 'spill the beans' about communist duplicity. He began writing such a piece in Banyuls, and sent a wire to the New Statesman asking if they would like to have it when he reached London. They said yes." Orwell worked as quickly as he could to finish his piece which he called 'Eye-witness in Barcelona'. When he arrived in London at the end of June he submitted the piece to the New Statesman—but Kingsley Martin, the editor, took exception to Orwell's conclusions and refused the article on the grounds that it would 'cause trouble'. Later that summer, when Philip Mairet published 'Spilling the Spanish Beans' in the New English Weekly, Orwell wrote, "People who ought to know better have lent themselves to the deception on the ground that if you tell the truth about Spain it will be used as Fascist propaganda." Orwell biographer Michael Shelden: "No doubt he had Kingsley Martin and Gollancz in mind...."
