= ILP Contingent =

The British Independent Labour Party sent a small contingent to fight in the Spanish Civil War. The contingent fought alongside the Workers' Party of Marxist Unification (POUM) and included George Orwell, who subsequently wrote about his experiences in his personal account Homage to Catalonia.

== Contingent membership ==
The main body of the ILP contingent consisting of about 25 men departed from England on 1 January 1937, under the leadership of Bob Edwards, later a Member of Parliament for the Labour Party.

The ILP had begun organising volunteers in November 1936 following the return to Britain of Bob Edwards from delivering an ambulance sent by the ILP for the POUM militia. Though there had been five times the number of volunteers, the ILP would only accept unmarried men for its contingent and 25 men left Britain on 8 January as the vanguard of a larger force to be sent later. However, the day after the contingent left, the British government announced that it would prosecute anyone going to fight in Spain and the ILP did not try to recruit any more volunteers.

On arriving in Barcelona, they had two weeks of very basic training, and were joined by Bob Smillie, grandson of the well-known Scottish socialist and miners' leader of the same name. Smillie had been in Barcelona working with John McNair as the representative Youth section of the International Bureau for Revolutionary Socialist Unity. However, he became convinced that he would be of most service at the front and persuaded McNair to let him sign up when the ILP contingent came over. He later died in Valencia.

The ILP contingent was attached to the POUM’s English-speaking contingent, as part of the centuria commanded by Georges Kopp. Once at the front, the initial group of twenty-five was sent to the front at Monte Oscuro, within sight of Zaragoza, some 12 miles to the south west, where they joined by a number of others who had arrived at the front a few weeks earlier, including Eric Blair, not yet using his pen name George Orwell; an Australian, Harvey Buttonshaw; US Revolutionary Workers League member Wolf Kupinski; and Bob Williams, a Welshman married to a Spanish woman who joined up with his brother-in-law, Ramon. With these, and other, additions the ILP contingent numbered somewhere between thirty and thirty-five. They left the front, with the POUM militia, in mid-February 1937 to take part in the siege of Huesca, some 50 miles away.

Eric Blair's background, prep school and Eton and his experience in Burma as police officer, are well known. The backgrounds of the other members of the contingent were diverse. Members were recorded as coming from South Africa (Buck Parker), the United States (Harry Milton, Wales, Belfast (Paddy O'Hara), Chorley, Larkhall, Glasgow (Charles Doran), Anglesey, Manchester, Bristol (Tom Coles), Dartford, Bingley, Twickenham and Golders Green. Four had fought in the First World War: Martin, who had gone to Spain driving the ambulance with Edwards and who, because of his experience in artillery, had stayed on; Doran; Harry Thomas of London and Arthur Chambers, who died in 1938 after transferring to a CNT unit. Few others, apart from Harry Webb, the stretcher-bearer and O'Hara, who had some training in first aid, had either military or medical experience.

== War experiences ==
Arriving at the Lenin Barracks in Barcelona, where they were initially stationed, on 10 January, a discussion circle was formed. Whilst the discussion group centred on political issues the group was not solely concerned with such topics. A social secretary was also appointed to 'arrange concerts and entertainments' and a sports secretary was elected with a hasty football match organised between the ILPers and a team of Spanish militia-men.

The training received at the Barracks was notoriously short and at the end of January the ILP contingent, as the British section of the POUM militia, began their journey, stopping off at Lerida, where they were visited by the ILP's representative in Spain, John McNair, before leaving for the area surrounding Huesca on the Aragon Front on 2 February. At the front, the contingent took over three advanced posts, about 100 yards distant from the others, joined by communication trenches. The outposts, on the slope of the hills looking west, were about two hundred yards from the nearest Nationalist lines on the opposite slopes looking east.

Bob Edwards, reporting in the New Leader, the ILP's weekly paper, was keen to stress the most 'exciting' aspects of the unit's work. He wrote about scouting within hearing distance along the Nationalist lines with Blair, of holding their position and dealing with the desertion of Nationalists. The main descriptions of fighting against the Nationalists which appears both in Homage to Catalonia and in the New Leader, concerned a night attack in which some of the contingent took part resulting in injuries to Reg Hiddlestone, Paddy Thomas and Douglas Thompson. Injuries were also sustained at other times, Blair himself was famously shot through the throat by a sniper. However, the reality of the contingent's activity was more mundane. It largely consisted of building roads from their dug-out to the nearest Spanish position and creating a dug-out for community purposes where they could meet to talk and receive instructions. In terms of military combat the contingent saw relatively little action.

As Orwell later put it:

Meanwhile nothing happened, nothing ever happened. The English had got into the habit of saying that this wasn't a war it was a bloody pantomime.

== Suppression of POUM ==
Although the ILP contingent did not play a major part in the military side of the Spanish Civil War it was famously and controversially involved in the events surrounding the battles between rival Republican groups in Barcelona, known as the Barcelona May Days.

The ILP contingent, although on leave in Barcelona, were split into groups during this fighting and none of the ILP contingent were drawn into the fighting in any extended way. However, the significance of Barcelona for the ILP lay not so much in the events themselves as in the reaction to the situation. Immediately after the events the Communist press began to attack POUM, claiming they were solely responsible for the fighting and were in league with the fascists in doing so. These accusations were quickly published in the Daily Worker, appearing in the 11 May issue. The New Leader of 21 May carried extensive comment on the 'Counter-Revolution in Spain'. ILP General Secretary Fenner Brockway argued that the Communists were on the wrong side of the barricades and were now 'committed to the defence of property', suggesting that the Communist Parties not only in Spain, but everywhere, had ceased to be revolutionary parties. The Communist Party responded by accusing the ILP of 'taking part in the fascist rising'.

On 16 June, the POUM was made illegal, accused of collaborating with the enemy. Its leaders were arrested and Andreu Nin murdered. ILP leader John McNair arrived in Barcelona on 18 June with money and documents to organise the evacuation of the ILP contingent and was promptly arrested as a "POUM agent" but was released when he had proven his identity. He then went into hiding with Orwell and Cottman and managed to leave the country. Most of the rest of the contingent returned to Britain over the next six months.

Meanwhile, in Britain, the Communist Party press had been accusing both the ILP and POUM of being agents of fascism. The press published two interviews with former contingent member Frank Frankford claiming he had witnessed fraternisation at the front with the enemy, that Kopp was receiving his orders from Huesca and that the Nationalist faction even supplied the POUM with arms.

The situation for the members of the ILP contingent in Spain was made extremely uncomfortable by the attacks on POUM and it became more so as the Communists banned the ILP's Spanish 'brother party'. The ILP made considerable efforts to get its members home safely and several of the ILP contingent made furtive returns home escaping police arrest. For example, Cottmann, McNair, Blair and his wife Eileen O'Shaughnessy, who had been working for McNair at the ILP office, made an escape across the border by train posing as wealthy English businessmen.

Of those closely associated with the ILP contingent, the arrest of Kopp, the unit commander, and Milton, one of the American members of the contingent, were of particular concern. However, both were eventually released. Milton did not spend long in jail, as McNair ensured his release. Kopp on the other hand, despite attempted intervention on his behalf by the ILP, remained in prison for a further eighteen months. However, most attention both at the time and since, has focused on the case of Bob Smillie who died in jail in Valencia, officially of appendicitis, on 13 June. Smillie's death has been surrounded in mystery, and has been the subject of much speculation, focussing on accusations that he was "done to death" by the Communists. Although the issue remains controversial, recent scholarship tends to concur with the contemporary findings of the official ILP report into the investigation, conducted by David Murray of Motherwell ILP, found that the authorities were guilty of carelessness rather than violence or direct malice. Orwell had this to say on the matter, in Chapter 14 of Homage to Catalonia:

Of course I assumed at once that Smillie had been shot. It was what everyone believed at the time, but I have since thought that I may have been wrong. [. . .] I must say this, however. Bob Smillie was only twenty-two years old and physically he was one of the toughest people I have met. He was, I think, the only person I knew, English or Spanish, who went three months in the trenches without a day's illness. People so tough as that do not usually die of appendicitis if they are properly looked after. But when you saw what the Spanish jails were like--the makeshift jails used for political prisoners--you realized how much chance there was of a sick man getting proper attention. The jails were places that could only be described as dungeons. In England you would have to go back to the eighteenth century to find anything comparable. [. . .] Smillie's death is not a thing I can easily forgive. Here was this brave and gifted boy, who had thrown up his career at Glasgow University in order to come and fight against Fascism, and who, as I saw for myself, had done his job at the front with faultless courage and willingness; and all they could find to do with him was to fling him into jail and let him die like a neglected animal. I know that in the middle of a huge and bloody war it is no use making too much fuss over an individual death. One aeroplane bomb in a crowded street causes more suffering than quite a lot of political persecution. But what angers one about a death like this is its utter pointlessness. To be killed in battle--yes, that is what one expects; but to be flung into jail, not even for any imaginary offence, but simply owing to dull blind spite, and then left to die in solitude--that is a different matter. I fail to see how this kind of thing--and it is not as though Smillie's case were exceptional--brought victory any nearer.

Smillie, the first foreigner associated with the POUM to become a mortal victim of the Stalinist repression, had been detained at the French border accused of "carrying arms" - a dud hand-bomb was found among the various souvenirs he had with him.

By November 1937, there were claimed to be 15,000 anti-fascist prisoners in the Republic’s jails, about 1,000 of them from the POUM. The Right Opposition and other marxist groupings organised an international campaign in solidarity with the POUM prisoners which probably saved their leaders from a similar fate to Nin’s. The IBRSU also sent several delegations to Spain to visit the party’s prisoners and try to secure their release, the first headed by its General Secretary, Fenner Brockway. In August, another delegation arrived including the ILP MP James Maxton. A third delegation went in November headed by another ILP MP, John McGovern.

Despite the suppression of POUM, not all of the ILP contingent returned home immediately. Arthur Chambers, Bob Williams and Reg Hiddlestone all stayed on to fight in Spain. Williams returned home in December 1938 after being injured three times, Hiddlestone was the final member of the contingent left in Spain, returning home in February 1939, leaving Barcelona only hours before Barcelona fell. Chambers was the only member of the ILP contingent to be killed in combat in Spain when he was shot by a sniper in August 1938 after transferring to a Confederación Nacional del Trabajo (CNT) unit.

== ILP Contingent ==
- Agnew, John
- Avory, Lewis Ernest
- Bennett, William
- Blair, Eric (George Orwell), corporal; wounded by sniper 20.5.37
- Braithwaite (Branthwaite), John
- Buttonshaw, Harvey
- Castle, Les
- Chambers, Bill, corporal, killed after transferring to another unit 8/37
- Clarke, William
- Clinton, Arthur, wounded in shoulder during shelling 3/37
- Coles, Tom
- Connor, Jock
- Cottman, Stafford
- Donovan, (Paddy) John, sergeant
- Doran, Charles
- Edwards, Bob, driver of ILP ambulance 9/36; Poum captain - returned to Britain in March 1937 for ILP conference, but because of British anti-volunteer policy he couldn’t return to Spain,
- Evans
- Farrell, James
- Frankford, Frank
- Gross, George
- Hiddlestone, Reg, wounded in night attack 4/37
- Hunter, Philip, leg injury 4/37
- Jones, Uriah, served until early 1938; after the disbanding of the Poum militia joined Psuc unit
- Julius
- Justessen, Charles
- Kupinsky/i, Wolf, ("Harry Milton"), In Barcelona's Modelo prison 13.8.37. - released after pressure from US consulate
- Levin, Louis
- McDonald, Robert
- Mcneil, Hugh
- Martin, W. B. - drove ambulance from Britain to Aragon in September 1936. Had been an artillery man in the first world war and was put in charge of artillery section of 60 men
- Moyle, Douglas
- O’Hara, Patrick, first aid
- Parker, Thomas "Buck", corporal, wounded during advance 4/37
- Ramon
- Ritchie, John
- Smillie, Bob died in prison
- Smith James J
- Stearns, Douglas Clark
- "Tanky" (James Arthur Cope)
- Thomas, Harry, Welshman wounded in night attack 4/37
- Thomas, Parry
- Thompson, Douglas, wounded in night attack 4/37
- Webb, Harry
- Williams, Bob
- Wilton, Mike
- Wingate, Sybil, joined ILP contingent (she was already in Barcelona) as nurse.

== Notes and references ==
- Fenner Brockway, Inside the Left, 1942
- Buchanan, Tom "The Death of Bob Smillie, the Spanish Civil War and the Eclipse of the Independent Labour Party", The Historical Journal, 1997
- Buchanan, Tom 'The Death of Bob Smillie: a reply', The Historical Journal, 2000
- Cohen, Gidon The Failure of a Dream; The Independent Labour Party from disaffiliation to World War II, 2007
- Bernard Crick, George Orwell: A Life, 1980
- Hall, Christopher 'Not Just Orwell':The Independent Labour party Volunteers and the Spanish Civil War, Warren and Pell, Barcelona, 2009
- Newsinger, John "The Death of Bob Smillie", The Historical Journal, 1998
- George Orwell, Homage to Catalonia
- Thwaits, Peter "The Independent Labour Party Contingent in the Spanish Civil War", Imperial War Museum Review, 1987
