= Georges Kopp =

Belgian engineer (1902–1951)

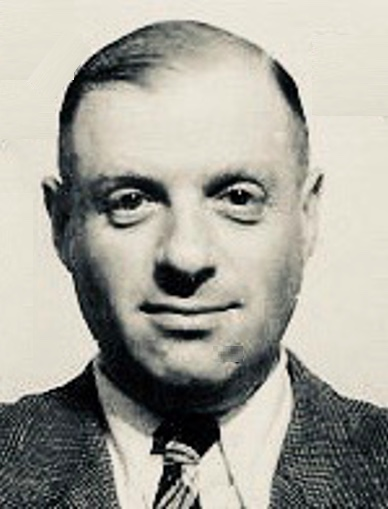
- Kopp in 1944
- Born: 10 October 1902; Saint Petersburg, Russia
- Died: 15 July 1951 (aged 48); Marseille, France
- Occupations: Engineer, soldier, inventor
- Spouses: Germaine Warnotte (m. 1925; div. 1935) Doreen Hunton (m. 1944)
- Children: 8

Georges Kopp (10 October 1902 – 15 July 1951) was a Belgian-educated engineer and inventor of Russian descent. He is best known for his friendship with George Orwell, whom he commanded in the Spanish Civil War when both men were volunteers in the fight against fascism.

== Early life and education ==
Georges Kopp was born in St. Petersburg to Russian parents with Ashkenazi Jewish origins.

In 1909, the family fled Tzarist Russia and settled close to Brussels in Schaerbeek. The family moved again in 1915 to Lausanne, Switzerland, before returning to Schaerbeek in 1920, where Kopp studied civil engineering at the Université libre de Bruxelles.

== Career ==
=== Engineering ===
In 1921, Kopp’s father died, leaving the family in debt and forcing Kopp to interrupt his studies to earn money, working as an engineer to support his family, initially living with his mother in Schaerbeek.

Kopp worked for a firm of heating manufacturers (Société Chaurobel) from 1923 until 1932. In 1925, he married Germaine Warnotte, the daughter of a prominent socialist and together they raised five children over the next ten years. The onset of the Great Depression resulted in Kopp being laid off from work in 1933. He struggled to make a living as a consultant, running up bills and allegedly having affairs. Germaine, discovering his infidelity, divorced him in 1935. The following year, after an argument with his mother, Kopp left for France to consider his future, overwhelmed with regret and missing his family.

=== Spanish Civil War ===
In October 1936, Kopp crossed the border from France into Spain and volunteered as an officer (Note: In 1936, the POUM militia operated under a structureless flat hierarchy, with no obvious distinction between officer and private soldier. It would have been easy for a skilled linguist like Kopp to assume a position of authority translating commands down the line in an international fighting force with no common language) for the Republicans by joining the POUM militia column. He first saw active service on the Aragon front near Zaragoza, followed by Huesca.

In December, the POUM militia was absorbed into the Catalan Army and later became the 29th Division. George Orwell crossed in to Spain in the same month, joining the 29th Division with Kopp as his brigade commander. Orwell describes how his "comandante" (Kopp) led them to the front in January 1937 and the various acts of personal bravery that followed over the next 115 days at the front. Orwell and Kopp developed a close working relationship over this period, establishing lasting mutual trust and respect. There were inconsistencies in Kopp's account of his background, which Orwell was, uncharacteristically, not aware of at the time. Thus, his book on the Spanish War, Homage to Catalonia, contains false details on Kopp's past as a "Belgian officer' and weapon-smuggler who had 'given enverything up" to save the Spanish Republic.

Kopp and Orwell left the front late in April 1937 for rest and relaxation in Barcelona and became caught up in Barcelona May Days as Government Guards moved against the Anarchists. Kopp risked his life to stop the fighting at the Café Moka, but the ideological war within the republican movement was to end in disaster for Kopp. Orwell had been joined in Barcelona by his wife Eileen, who was working with the ILP Contingent of British volunteers attached to POUM. Some sources reported that Eileen had a relationship with Kopp at this time, and that the Orwells had a "somewhat open marriage". However, Anna Funder, in her 2023 book Wifedom: Mrs Orwell's Invisible Life, reports that although Eileen realised that Kopp was in love with her, his feelings were not reciprocated.

Orwell returned to the trenches and was shot through the throat by a sniper's bullet, ending his participation in the war. Kopp was on hand to help his friend but returned to the front to participate in the Battle of Chimillas.

In June, Kopp decided to leave the POUM, securing a testimonial letter describing him as "a person of confidence" by General Pozas, who was commanding the Army in the East. He travelled to Valencia to register his new position as an engineer, having risen to become captain in the general staff of the 45th Mixed Brigade of the Spanish Republican Army. On 16 June, the POUM was declared illegal, resulting in its members, and former members, being arrested and thrown into jail. Purges against the POUM raged through Barcelona in secret to stop the news getting to the front where the POUM was still holding the line. Kopp had been advised to remain in Valencia to allow the dust to settle, which he ignored, possibly because he had "simply not taken it seriously enough". He was arrested as soon as he arrived at his hotel in Barcelona, his papers confiscated, and imprisoned under appalling conditions. Orwell and Eileen visited Kopp in jail, immediately recognising the importance of the letter. Orwell successfully traced the letter to the chief of police and managed to get it transferred to the military authorities, exposing himself to arrest in the process. The last time Orwell saw Kopp in Spain was on 21 June 1937, two days before he and Eileen slipped across the border into France.

Kopp was one of thousands of volunteers who fought in Spain to oppose fascism and was imprisoned by its own side, under the banner of an ideological purge imposed by the NKVD directed by Stalin. Kopp was interrogated, tortured and moved between prisons, detention camps in and around Barcelona for the next 18 months, largely out of sight.

=== World War II ===
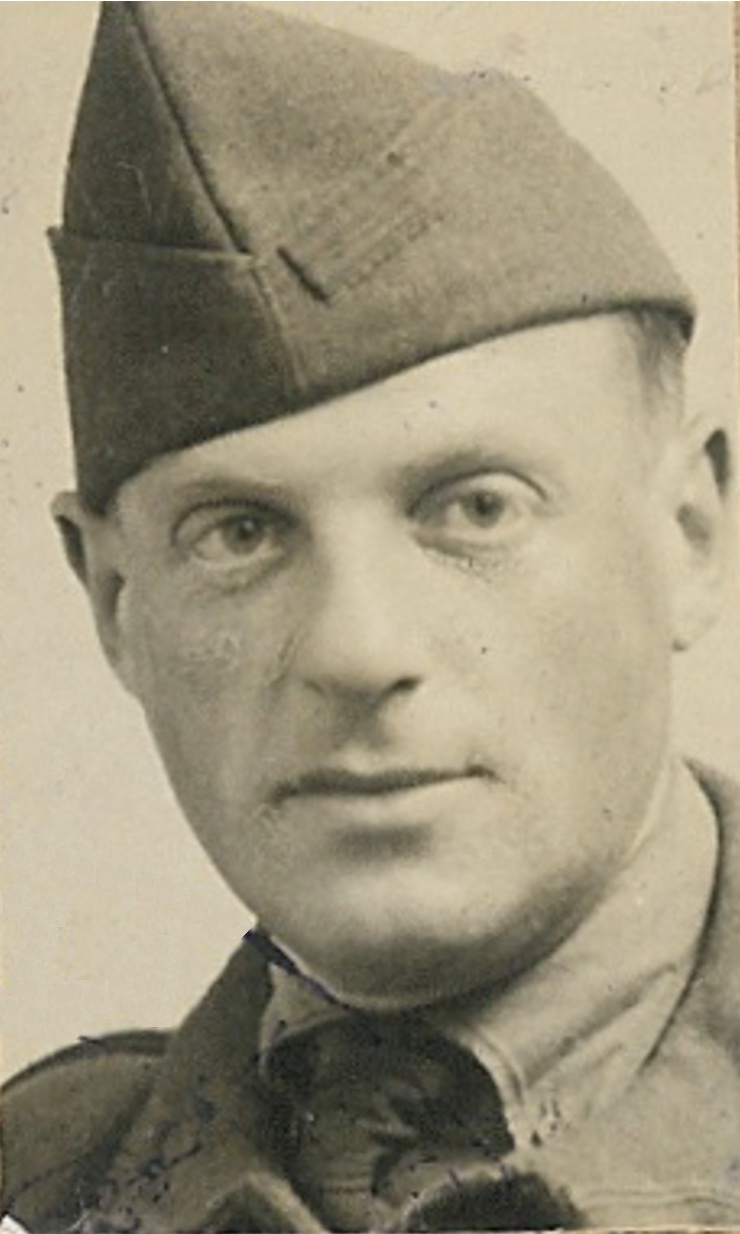
Georges Kopp, French Foreign Legion 1939

Kopp was released in December 1938 a free man but in a severely reduced state, flying to Toulouse before making his way to Brussels to see his daughter. He had survived by building stories around himself, accused by the Communists of being a Trotskyist and dismissed by Trotsky himself as politically "centrist".

Kopp sought refuge in England in March 1939, in part at the invitation of Orwell. He stayed with Eileen's brother, Laurence O'Shaughnessy and sister-in-law Gwen, where he was gradually nursed back to health. In May, he left London for Paris.

At the outbreak of World War II in September 1939, Kopp joined the French Foreign Legion as a corporal and fought in the Battle of France in May–June 1940, barely surviving the Blitzkrieg that many of his comrades did not. Kopp was severely wounded and made prisoner but escaped from a military hospital and was able to rejoin his unit, now a defeated army, just outside of Marseille in August. The following month, Kopp was transferred to Foreign Legion headquarters in Algeria, where he was invalided out of the army and was awarded an 80% pension.

=== Spy ===
Kopp set out to work as an engineer in Marseille, in Vichy France early 1941, where he remained for two and a half years working on a method for distilling synthetic oil from lignite, common in that part of France. It is possible that the project was supported by the French admiralty under the control of French Intelligence. Kopp himself remained ambivalent about whether working on this technology would actually help the Nazis but over the next year, he expanded his Vichy network, whilst simultaneously courting British Intelligence. In March 1943, Kopp suspended development of synthetic oil because of the "high risk of the Germans wiping out the Vichy Government". MI5, who had been monitoring his activities, decided to use his network on the recommendations of Major Anthony Blunt, who became Kopp's controller. By June 1943, Kopp had created a new cover role as a consulting engineer for the Vichy Ministry of Industrial Production, allowing him to increase his network of operatives further; in effect, Kopp was a double agent from that moment. (Note: Arguably, Kopp could not back away from French intelligence without drawing attention to his enrolment with British intelligence.)

In August 1943, the Gestapo arrested one of Kopp’s operatives. The following month, another operative failed to show at a pre-arranged meeting; the noose was tightening. Kopp was given the order to cease operations and a week later, he arrived in London for demobilisation.

== Personal life ==
Kopp initially moved back in with the O’Shaughnessys, where he met Gwen’s sister, Doreen Hunton. MI5 held out some hope for retaining Kopp’s services and helped him to settle, securing work for him as an engineer, arranging his papers and finding him somewhere to live. In February 1944, Kopp moved to a flat in Canonbury Square and the following month, he married Doreen, witnessed by his friend George Orwell. A few months later, Orwell and Eileen also moved in to a flat in Canonbury Square a few doors down from the Kopps with their newly adopted son, Richard. Doreen had their first child in February 1945. A few weeks later Eileen, who had taken Richard to stay at the Hunton family home in County Durham, died. After the funeral, Orwell brought his son back to Canonbury Square to stay with the Kopps until he could arrange for a fulltime nurse, and returned to Europe.

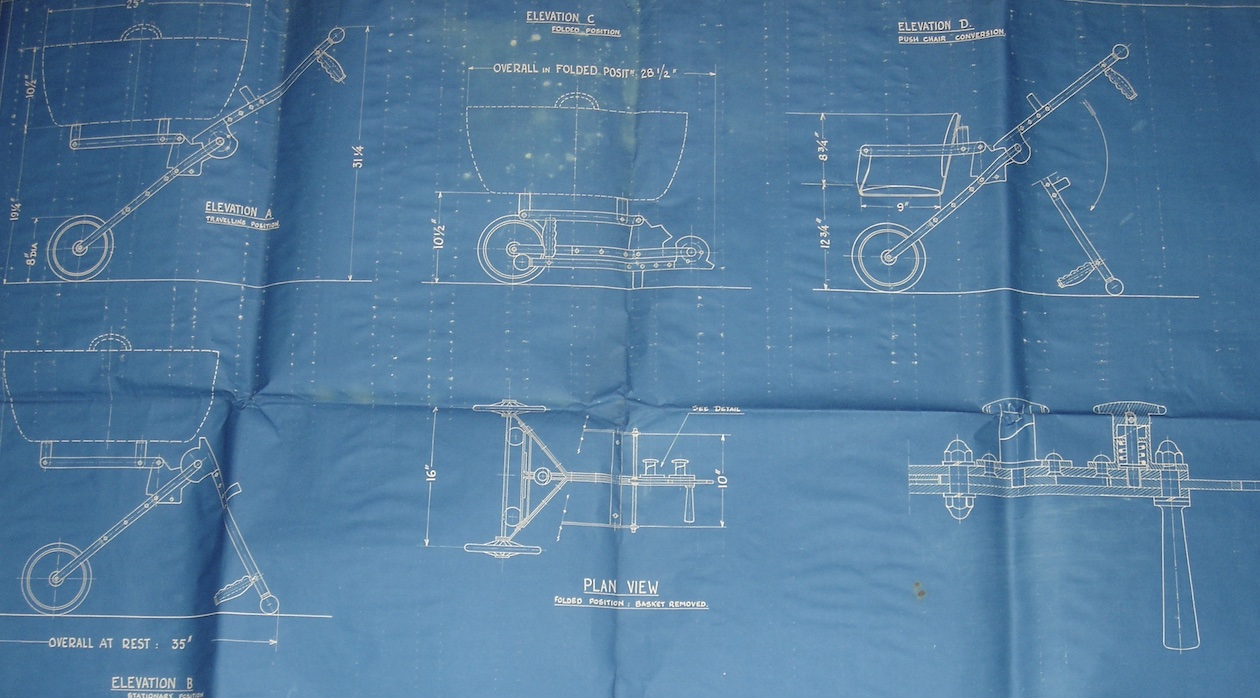
Sample of "Baby Buggy" design by Georges Kopp, 1949

Kopp moved his family to Toftcombs House in Biggar, South Lanarkshire, at the end of 1945, a radical change from town life to that of a "gentleman farmer" living in grand style, with a small holding of animals on the estate. He worked as an engineer for a small factory in Edinburgh, but the income was never enough to sustain life at Toftcombs. This was the time when Kopp turned once again to innovation, creating designs and filing patents for a string of innovative creations. His capacity to invent devices for modern living convenience was not matched by his ability to commercialise them, which led to financial difficulty. Over the next few years, Kopp’s family expanded, but he was forced to sell Toftcombs and move to a series of temporary homes, haunted by the promise of contracts for his inventions that never materialised, which were taking a toll on his health.

Orwell died in January 1950. Two months later, Kopp moved his family to France, bolstered by continued promises from potential investors in his designs. Kopp died suddenly on 15 July 1951 in Marseille, possibly of cardiac arrest; he had suffered from phlebitis in both legs, which may have created a blood clot that induced a pulmonary embolism. Doreen reported that Kopp was repairing a clock when he died. There remains no trace of his grave.

== Sources ==
- Wildemeersch, Marc, George Orwell’s Commander in Spain: The Enigma of Georges Kopp. Thames River Press, 2013 ISBN 9780857281982
- Orwell, George, Homage to Catalonia. Martin Secker & Warburg Ltd., 1938 ISBN 9780141183053
- Bowker, Gordon, Orwell. St. Martin's Press, 2003 ISBN 978-0-349-11551-1
- Davison, Peter, Orwell in Spain. Penguin, 2001 ISBN 9780141185163
- Orwell, Sonia and Ian Angus, Orwell - An Age Like This, 1920-1940, vol. 1. Penguin, 1968 ISBN 9780141185163
