= Lettice Cooper =

English writer

- Born: 3 September 1897; Eccles, Lancashire, England
- Died: 24 July 1994 (aged 96); Coltishall, Norfolk, England
- Education: Lady Margaret Hall, Oxford
- Occupation: Writer

Lettice Ulpha Cooper OBE (3 September 1897 – 24 July 1994) was an English writer.

== Biography ==
She began to write stories when she was seven, and studied Classics at Lady Margaret Hall, Oxford, graduating in 1918.

She returned home after Oxford to work for her family's engineering firm and wrote her first novel, The Lighted Room in 1925. She spent a year as associate editor at Time and Tide. Her novel The New House (1936) describes the events of a single day. National Provincial (1938) depicts 'Aire', a city based on Leeds, during the 1930s. The characters cover a wide social range, and many are involved in left-wing politics. A main thread of the novel is the conflict between militant and moderate socialists, which finds bitter expression in the course of an unofficial strike, and during a Parliamentary election campaign.

During the Second World War Cooper worked for the Ministry of Food's public relations division. Black Bethlehem (1947) is an unusually-structured novel, a psychological study of wartime and postwar anxieties on the battlefield and on the Home Front. The novel reflects her strong interest in psychoanalysis.

Cooper met Eileen Blair (George Orwell's wife) during the war, who is thought to have used her as the basis for the character of Ann in Black Bethlehem. In an account, printed in Orwell Remembered, Cooper recalled that Eileen described how Orwell read each installment of Animal Farm to her each evening and she came in each morning to tell her colleagues how the book was developing.
Between 1947 and 1957 Cooper was fiction reviewer for The Yorkshire Post.

Her novel Fenny (1953) is set in Florence, where she frequently visited her close friend, Lionel Fielden. She was one of the founders of the Writers' Action Group along with Brigid Brophy, Maureen Duffy, Francis King and Michael Levey and received an OBE for her work in achieving Public Lending Rights.

Snow and Roses (1973) is a novel set in Yorkshire and based on events of the miners' strike of 1972.

She wrote County Books series volume Yorkshire West Riding, published by Robert Hale in 1950.

At a PEN Congress in Stockholm, a Swedish writer remarked of Cooper: "She is what we expect English people to be but what they so seldom are."

She never married.

== Awards and honours ==
She was appointed OBE in the 1978 Birthday Honours. In 1987 at the age of ninety she was awarded the Freedom of the City of Leeds.

== Selected works ==
- The Lighted Room (1925)
- The Ship of Truth (1930)
- The New House (1936) (Reprinted by Persephone Books in 2004)
- National Provincial (1938) (Reprinted by Persephone Books in 2018)
- Fenny (1953)
- Biography of Robert Louis Stevenson (1947)
- Black Bethlehem (1947)
- Three Lives (1957)
- Blackberry's Kitten (1960)
- The Double Heart (1962)
- Tea on Sunday (1973)
- Snow and Roses (1976)
- Desirable Residence (1980)
- Unusual Behaviour (1986)
- Une Journee avec Rhoda (1994)
