= Eileen Blair =

British writer (1905–1945)

- Born: Eileen Maud O'Shaughnessy; 25 September 1905; South Shields, Tyne and Wear, England
- Died: 29 March 1945 (aged 39); Newcastle upon Tyne, England
- Resting place: St Andrew's and Jesmond Cemetery, West Jesmond, Newcastle upon Tyne
- Education: St Hugh's College, University of Oxford, University College London
- Spouse: George Orwell (m. 1936)
- Children: Richard Blair (adopted)

Eileen Maud Blair (née O'Shaughnessy, 25 September 1905 – 29 March 1945) was a British poet and psychologist. She was the first wife of Eric Arthur Blair, commonly known as the English author George Orwell. During the Spanish Civil War in 1937, she volunteered as an English-French typist for the Independent Labour Party leader John McNair while Orwell was fighting with the POUM. When the POUM was declared illegal, she helped her husband escape from Spain.

Blair supported Orwell as a typist, collaborator and critic of his works. She was left in charge of his manuscript for his novel The Road to Wigan Pier in 1937, when Orwell left to fight in the Spanish Civil War. During World War II, she worked for the Censorship Department of the Ministry of Information in London and the Ministry of Food.

After living with a condition of the uterus for years, Blair booked an operation for a hysterectomy and died during surgery at the age of 39, while Orwell was working away on an assignment in Europe. Biographers have credited her with being influential on Orwell's work, including his 1945 novella Animal Farm. Her poem titled "End of the Century, 1984", which was published in 1934, the year before she met Orwell, foreshadowed his 1949 dystopian novel Nineteen Eighty-Four.

== Early life and education ==
Blair was born Eileen Maud O'Shaughnessy on 25 September 1905 in South Shields. She was the daughter of Laurence O'Shaughnessy, an inspector of customs and excise, and Mary Westgate. Her father was born in County Kerry, Ireland, in 1866 and moved to England in the 1880s. He and his English wife settled in South Shields and raised their children as Anglicans. She spent her early years in the family home at Westgate House, Beach Road. During her childhood she attended Westoe School. Her brother Laurence Frederick O'Shaughnessy, was born on 24 December 1900. He attended South Shields High School for Boys, then pursued a career as a thoracic surgeon.

Blair attended Sunderland Church High School, where she excelled academically and was awarded several bursaries by the school to help her fiancially whilst at university. In October 1924, she entered St Hugh's College, Oxford, where she studied English literature and language, comprising gothic and German philology, Old English philology, Middle English philology and the history of the English language. During her three years at Oxford, her tutors included J. R. R. Tolkien and Mary Ethel Seaton. In 1927, she received a higher second-class degree. She was extremely disappointed to not achieve a first class degree. At the time, female students were a small minority, as the university had allowed women to graduate only four years earlier.

She held a succession of brief jobs, beginning as an assistant mistress at Silchester House, a girls' boarding school in Taplow in the Thames valley. She also worked as a secretary; a reader for the elderly Dame Elizabeth Cadbury; and was the proprietor of an office in Victoria Street, London, for typing and secretarial work. When she closed the office, she took up freelance journalism and sold an occasional feature piece to the Evening News. She helped her brother, Laurence, by typing, proofreading and editing his scientific papers and books.

In the autumn of 1934, Blair enrolled at University College London for a two-year postgraduate course in educational psychology, leading to a Master of Arts. She was particularly interested in testing intelligence in children and chose it as the subject for the thesis. Her faculty was led by Sir Cyril Burt, who was impressed by her abilities. Elizaveta Fen (pen name of Lydia Jackson Jiburtovich), a fellow student who became one of her closest friends, met her for the first time at University College when Blair was 28 years old. Fen described her as "tall and slender", with blue eyes and dark brown, naturally wavy hair.

== Poetry ==
During her school years, Blair produced poetry for the Chronicle, the Sunderland High School magazine. In 1922, she published Song, her first poem in the Chronicle. At the age of 17 she became the sub-editor of the magazine, a position she held until leaving school. In 1922, she published another poem titled Satis!.

Blair wrote a poem titled "End of the Century, 1984" to mark her school's fiftieth anniversary, which was published in the Sunderland High School magazine in 1934. It expressed her concerns about the contemporary emphasis on science, technology and reason making the poetry and art of the past obsolete. The poem is optimistic, looking fifty years into the future to the year 1984 with the expectation of a revival.

== Marriage ==
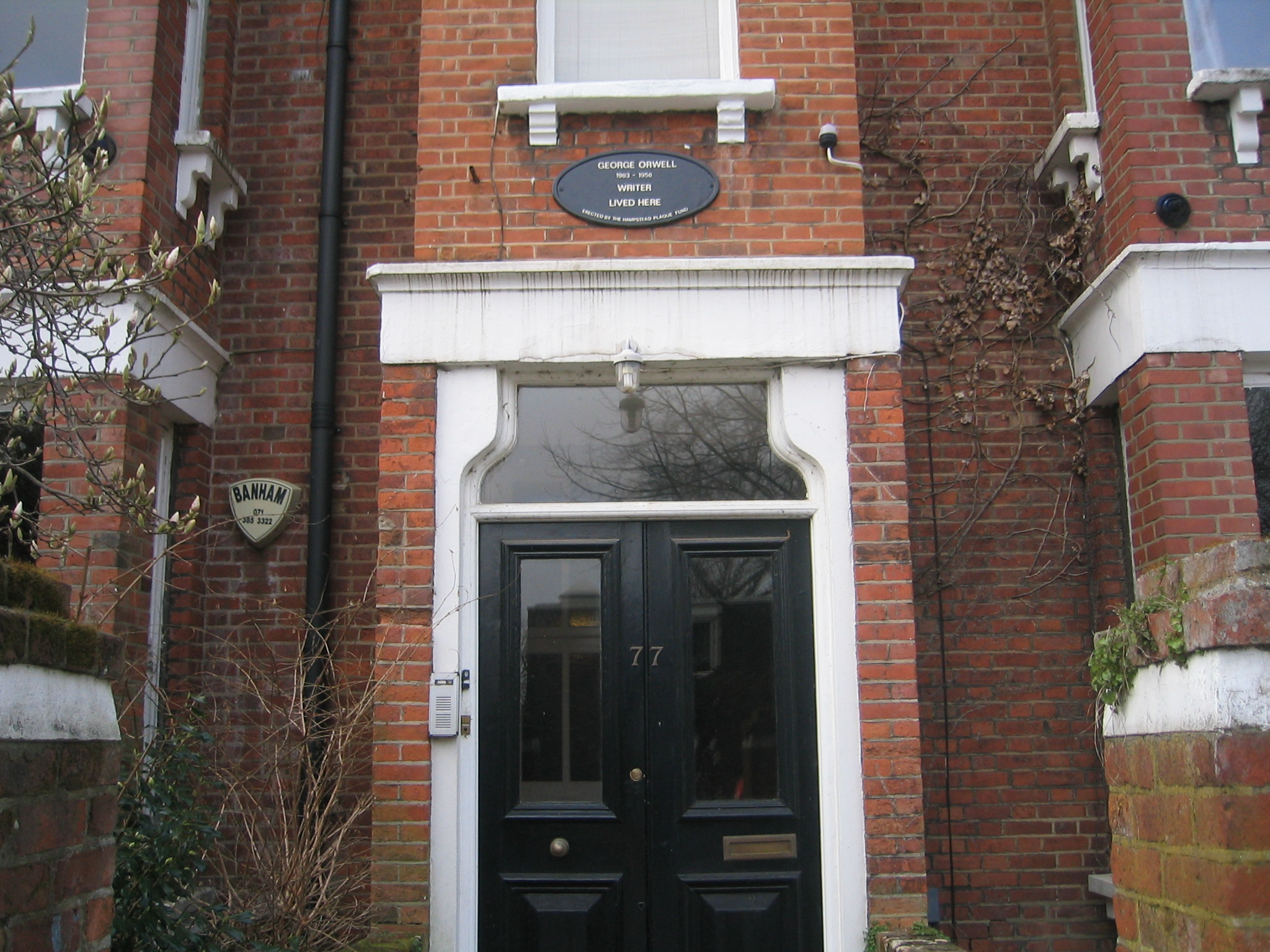
George Orwell’s residence at 77 Parliament Hill, Hampstead

She met Eric Arthur Blair, known by his pen name George Orwell, in the spring of 1935 at the age of 29. At the time he was living at 77 Parliament Hill in Hampstead, occupying a spare room in the first floor flat of Rosalind Henschel Obermeyer. While studying for a master's degree in psychology at University College London, Obermeyer invited some of her friends and acquaintances to a party one evening. Orwell was struck by O'Shaughnessy's lively personality and told Obermeyer that she was the type of woman he would marry. He courted her within a few weeks and proposed marriage, which she initially rejected and eventually accepted.

They married the next year, on 9 June 1936, at St Mary's Church, Wallington, Hertfordshire. Their first home was a cottage at Number 2, Kit's Lane, Wallington, known as "The Stores", where they lived until 1940. It was in a much poorer condition than the home in which she was raised. The cottage was small, damp, remote and lacked modern facilities. It also served as the village store, so Blair settled into married life by cooking and selling groceries while her husband was busy writing.

In a letter from November 1936, she wrote that she argued continuously with Orwell in the first few weeks of marriage, which was partially the result of Orwell's aunt Nellie Limouzin staying for two months in the spare bedroom. Blair wrote that her husband's family had warned her prior to marriage that he was "impossible to live with" but she noted that they failed to understand that she had a similar temperament. They wanted children, but Blair did not become pregnant, and they learned later that Orwell was sterile.

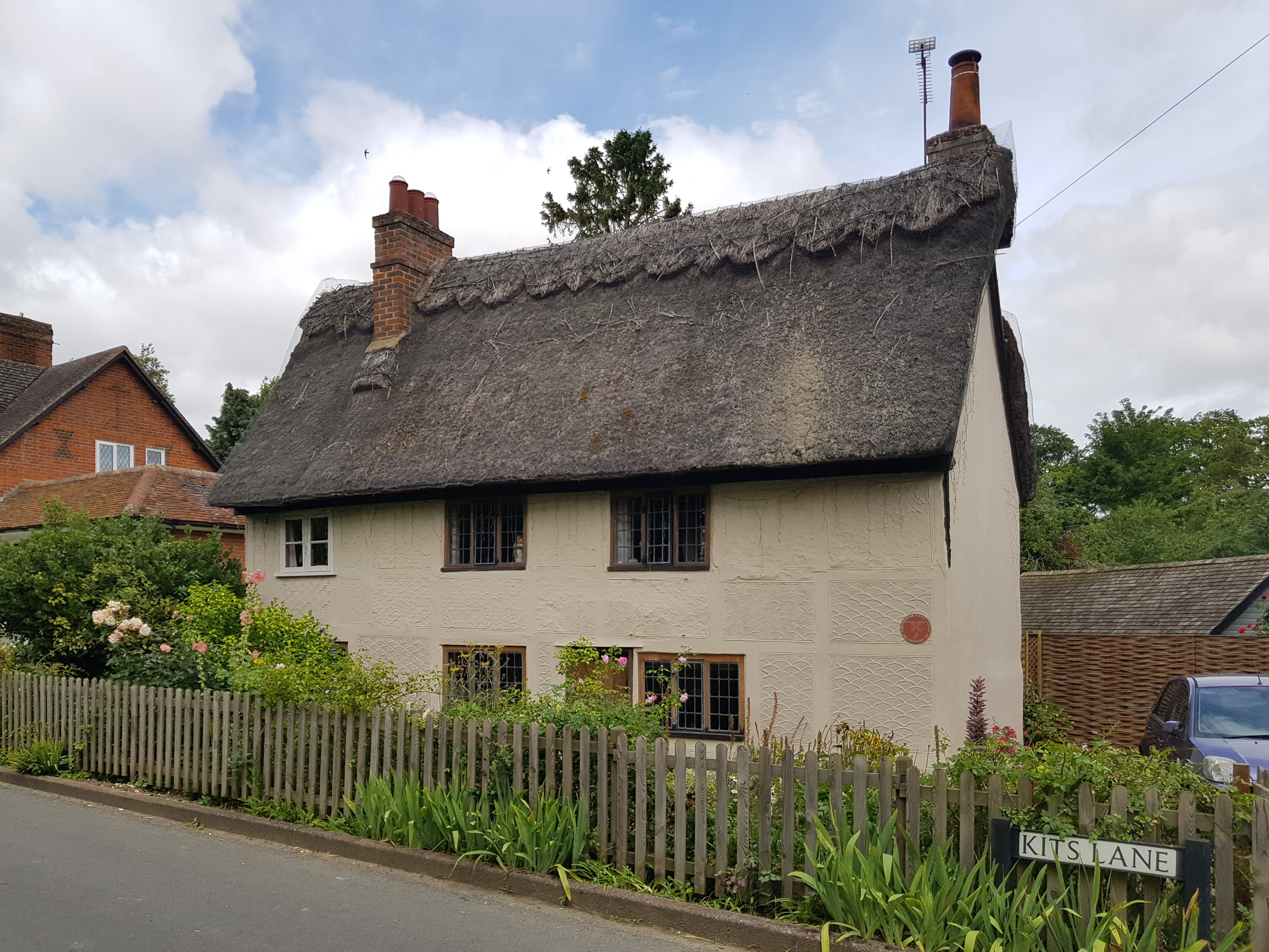
No 2, Kit's Lane, Wallington, Hertfordshire, where the Blairs lived from 1936 to 1940

Due to moving to Wallington, Blair was unable to complete her coursework for her psychology degree as she needed more school children for her research than were living in the village. She was content for their married life to revolve around Orwell's writing. She used her typing skills to help type her husband's manuscripts and critiqued his work. Friends credited her with improving Orwell's writing and he later said that she could have been a writer in her own right. Lettice Cooper wrote that there was more "light and colour in his writing". Richard Rees also noticed a "striking change of mood" in his writing in 1936. Although Blair challenged Orwell's beliefs, a friend noted that they worked well together. On 23 December 1936, Orwell announced that he was leaving for the Spanish Civil War and left his wife in charge of his unpublished book The Road to Wigan Pier. He told his agent that his wife had authority to make any changes to the manuscript on his behalf and she did so before deciding to join him in Spain.

Letters written by Orwell suggest that the Blairs had an open marriage. Orwell pursued Blair's friend, Lydia Jackson, and also a friend named Inez Holden, two romantic interests that he concealed from his wife. Blair also displayed interest in Georges Kopp, Orwell's commander in the Spanish Civil War.

== Spanish Civil War ==
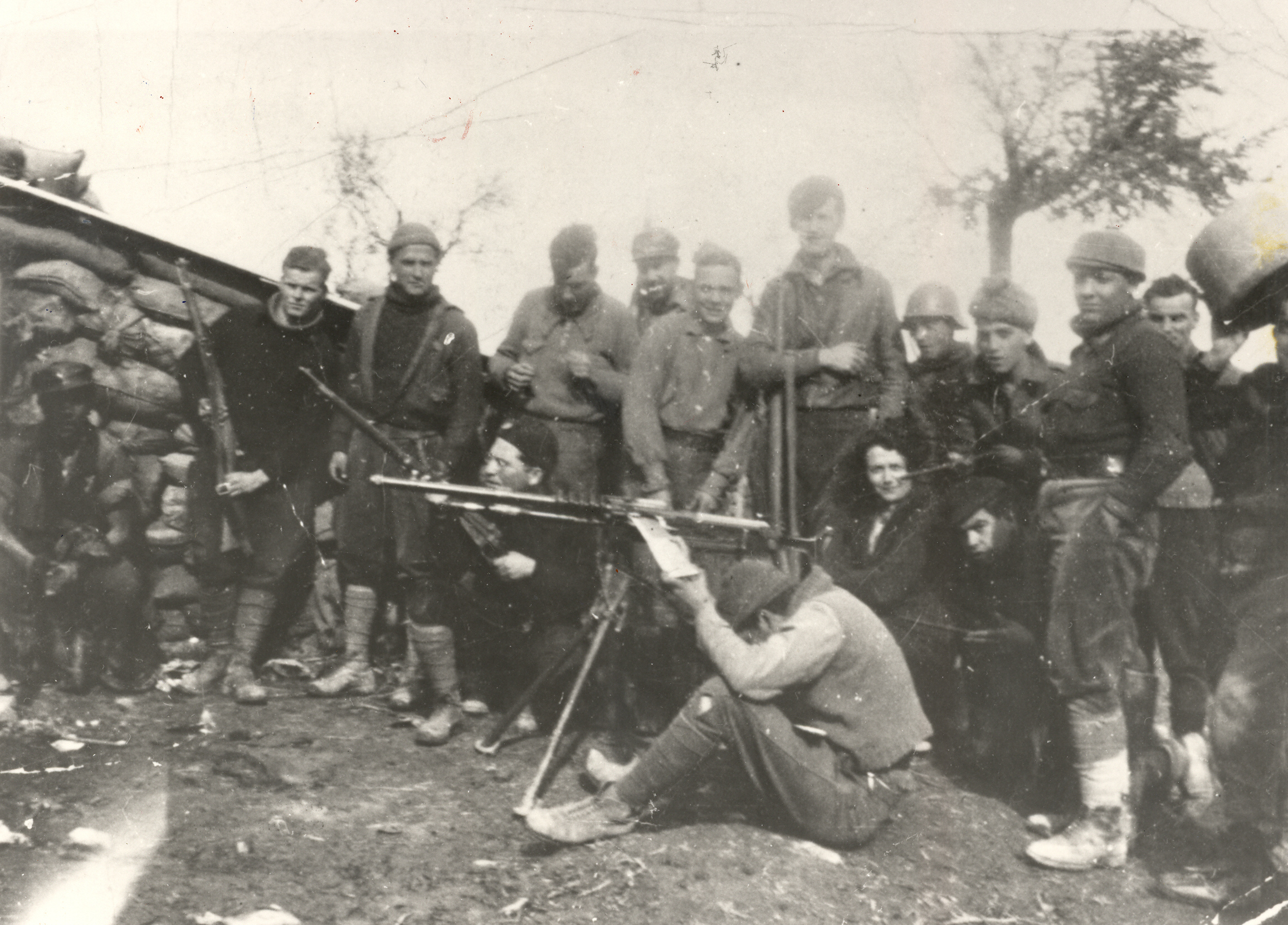
The Blairs with members of the ILP Contingent on the Aragon Front outside Huesca, 13 March 1937

Blair followed Orwell to Spain in mid-February 1937. She travelled alone through France and crossed the border to Spain. Blair volunteered for a post in the office of John McNair, the leader of the Independent Labour Party who coordinated the arrival of British volunteers, and brought her husband English tea, chocolate and cigars. The small unit of volunteers in the ILP was attached to the very large Workers' Party of Marxist Unification or POUM. Orwell was posted to the front, while Blair worked in Barcelona as an English-French shorthand typist.

Charles Orr, McNair's assistant, described her as "friendly, gregarious and unpretentious", unlike her socially awkward husband. While assisting Orr, Blair also managed the affairs and finances of the ILP contingent. Orr was impressed by Blair's secretarial skills and also her admiration of Orwell, stating that she could not stop talking about him. He felt that Orwell needed a social extrovert to help him communicate with others.

In mid-March, Blair convinced Kopp to take her to visit Orwell on the front. She stayed with him for three days and had her photo taken with the volunteers in the trenches. At night she stayed with Orwell in farmhouse outbuildings. She found the experience of witnessing the bombardment to be interesting and enjoyable. After the visit, Orwell wrote to her to thank her for bringing him supplies, describing her as a "wonderful wife". Blair had several admirers at the ILP, including David Wickes, an interpreter and spy for the Comintern, and Kopp, though it is unknown if she responded to their interest.

After several weeks at the front, Orwell was hospitalised for ten days with a poisoned hand. He returned to the front and near the end of April returned to Blair in Barcelona on leave. He had arrived in the time of the street battles that occurred during the May Days. After the street fighting stopped, he returned to the front.

The internal fighting between Republican forces resulted in an atmosphere of suspicion and paranoia in Barcelona. The ILP office was one of several suspect groups under surveillance with reports drawn up by the International Brigades’ branch of the military intelligence service, led by members of the Comintern. Both Orwell and Blair were being watched. While Orwell was away at the front, several volunteer friends were imprisoned.

On 20 May, a bullet hit Orwell in the neck and Blair had him transferred to a hospital in Barcelona. On 16 June, the POUM was accused of collaborating with the enemy and made illegal. Orwell's notes were confiscated by six plain-clothed policemen in a late night visit to Blair. She was able to obtain Orwell's travel documents while he was in hiding, likely saving his life.

On 15 June 1937, they escaped from Barcelona by train to the French border, disguising themselves as a tourist party. In France, the Orwells diverted to Banyuls-sur-Mer for a short stay and returned to England.

== Return to England and Second World War ==
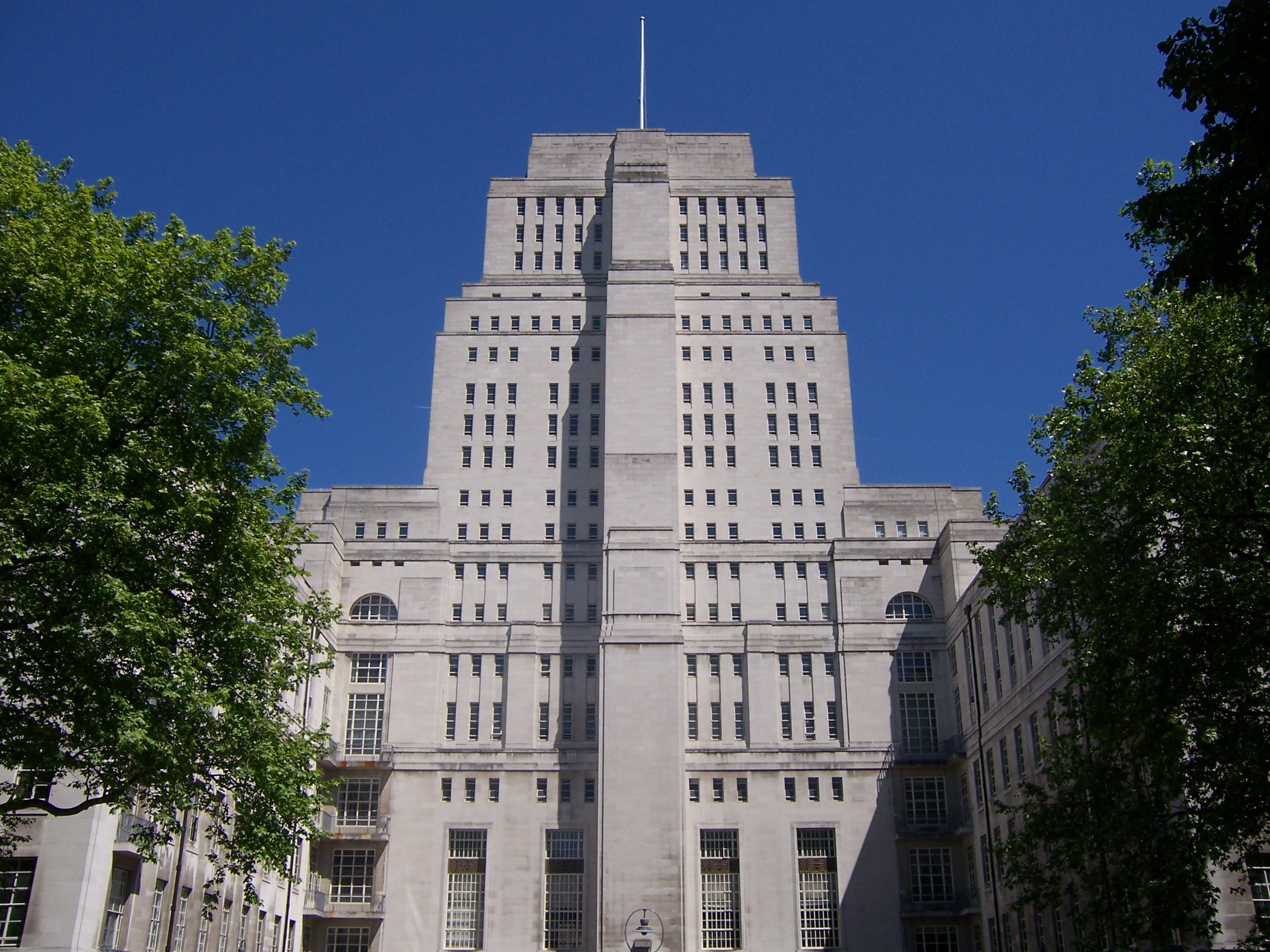
Senate House, London, where Blair worked at the Ministry of Information, was the model for the Ministry of Truth in Nineteen Eighty-Four.

After returning to their home in Wallington, Orwell suddenly began bleeding from the mouth in March 1938 and Blair received advice from her brother. He was diagnosed with tuberculosis and removed to a sanatorium in Kent for the summer. Blair travelled for five hours to visit him in the sanatorium every fortnight. On the advice of her brother, they spent the winter of 1938 in Marrakech, French Morocco, but both disliked the experience and Blair had a high fever. Orwell rented a house three miles from town, where he wrote the novel Coming Up for Air. At the end of 1938 she joined the Peace Pledge Union.

At the start of World War II, Blair began working in the Censorship Department of the Ministry of Information in London. The office where she worked was in Senate House, a 19-story stone building that Orwell used as his inspiration for the Ministry of Truth in Nineteen Eighty-Four. She stayed during the week with her family in Greenwich. She was the main breadwinner at this time. The Blairs had moved back to London for the convenience of their work, initially living in a flat at Dorset Chambers in Chagford Street, followed by Langford Court in Langford Place off Abbey Road. They then moved to 10 Mortimer Crescent, in Kilburn.

In May 1940, her brother, Laurence, was killed during the evacuation from Dunkirk, after which, according to Elizaveta Fen, "her grip on life, which had never been very firm, loosened considerably". Increasingly unwell from uterine bleeding, Blair left her job at the Ministry of Information, probably in the summer of 1941 with the departure of her boss. In December 1941 women were conscripted to work following a revision of the National Services Act (No.2), prompting her back to work, this time at the Ministry of Food before February 1942. During this time, she was commonly known as "Emily Blair". Later in the 1980s, her friend Lettice Cooper commented, "I find it difficult now to remember her as Eileen".

On 14 May 1944, the Blairs adopted a three-week-old boy, whom they named Richard Horatio Blair. David Astor thought they were "renewing their marriage round their new child". In June 1944, their flat in Mortimer Crescent was destroyed by a flying bomb, so they moved to a top-floor flat at 27 Canonbury Square, Islington, where Blair helped Orwell as he finished writing Animal Farm.

At the end of World War II, in February 1945, Orwell was sent to Paris as a war correspondent for The Observer and The Manchester Evening News. Blair and Richard went to live in Greystone House near Stockton-on-Tees with her sister-in-law Gwen O'Shaughnessy. In one of her last letters to Orwell, she wrote of arrangements for renting and decorating Barnhill, Jura, the house where Orwell wrote most of Nineteen Eighty-Four, but she died without seeing it.

== Death and posthumous recognition ==
Blair had been living with uterine bleeding for many years. In December 1940, she wrote that she had been confined to the bed for four weeks but the doctors failed to identify the exact cause of her illness. Sylvia Topp suggests that she may have been suffering from endometriosis. In early March 1945, she experienced pain and extensive vaginal bleeding and her friends had to get help.

On 28 March 1945, Blair entered the Fernwood House nursing home in Newcastle upon Tyne alone. She was scheduled for a hysterectomy to remove some rapidly growing tumours from her uterus. Orwell was, by late March, with the Allied forces on a march to Cologne and consequently missed the letters sent by his wife. In her letters, Blair wrote about the cost of the operation, commenting "I really don't think I'm worth the money". She told Orwell that she wanted him to focus on writing novels rather than concentrate on journalism and move to the country as she considered life in London a "nightmare". As she was already living in the North of England at Teesside, Blair took the advice of family and friends and booked for a quicker hysterectomy without pre-treatment under a Newcastle surgeon, Harvey Evers. She wrote one final letter to Orwell just before the operation, describing her room and the morphia injection, and it was left on her bedside table.

Blair died on 29 March 1945 in Newcastle upon Tyne under anaesthetic at the age of 39. The inquest noted: "Cardiac failure whilst under anaesthetic of ether and chloroform skilfully and properly administered for operation for removal of uterus." Orwell expressed the loss of his wife as "a terribly cruel and stupid thing to happen". In the following two years after Blair's death, he proposed marriage to several women, which he attributed to the feeling of being "desperately alone sometimes". Blair is buried in Saint Andrew's Cemetery, Jesmond, Newcastle upon Tyne.

In March 2022, a blue plaque displaying her birth name was unveiled at Westgate House, Beach Road, her former childhood home, in honour of Blair and her influence on Orwell's work. A blue plaque was also installed at her former school, Sunderland Church High School, in February 2023.

== Influence on Orwell's writing ==
Topp writes that Orwell's novel Nineteen Eighty-Four was foreshadowed by her poem, "End of the Century, 1984". She noted that the novel begins on 4 April, the day after Orwell buried his wife. Although the poem was written a year before she met Orwell, there are some similarities between the futuristic vision of her poem and Nineteen Eighty-Four. Blair's poem criticises rational scientific thought as "mental cremation", bearing some similarity to the restriction of free thought by Big Brother described in the novel.

Several biographers and friends have commented that Orwell's writing was enhanced after meeting his wife. Bernard Crick wrote that it "improved greatly after meeting Eileen, becoming a settled, simplified and consistent style". Peter Stansky and William Abrahams remarked on an "uncramped expression of feeling, a generosity and humaneness" in "Shooting an Elephant" that had previously been absent in Orwell's work and attributed it partly to Blair's influence. Gordon Bowker wrote that key ideas in Orwell's later works from The Road to Wigan Pier onwards likely resulted from the "intellectual stimulus" in his marriage. Lydia Jackson commented that Blair's "logic, her feeling for accuracy in the use of words influenced [Orwell], perhaps without his being aware of it, in improving his style of writing, which in earlier years had a certain crudity and calculated exaggeration, detracting from its power to carry conviction". Tosco Fyvel gave credit to "the conversational influence of Eileen and the light touch of her bright, humorous intelligence".

Blair collaborated with Orwell indirectly on Animal Farm. Orwell originally planned to write an essay, but she suggested a fable. They worked on it together in the evenings and their friends said they could see her style and humour in the novel. Orwell wrote of his wife, "It's a terrible shame that Eileen didn't live to see the publication of Animal Farm, which she was particularly fond of and even helped in the planning of." Blair's son, Richard, recognised his mother's input in Animal Farm: "it's a completely different book. It's got a light touch to it". He considered Blair to be an intellectual match for Orwell, commenting that she was "well educated, quite the equal to my father in terms of intellectual capacity".
