= Wallington, Hertfordshire =

Village in Hertfordshire, England

Coordinates: 51.988°N 0.119°W

Wallington
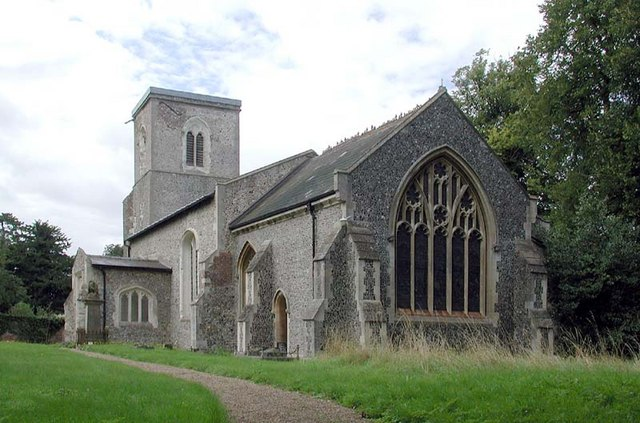
- St Mary, Wallington

- Location within Hertfordshire
- Population: 137 (Parish, 2021)
- Civil parish: Wallington
- District: North Hertfordshire
- Shire county: Hertfordshire
- Region: East
- Country: England
- Sovereign state: United Kingdom
- Post town: Baldock
- Postcode district: SG7
- Police: Hertfordshire
- Fire: Hertfordshire
- Ambulance: East of England
- UK Parliament: North East Hertfordshire

Wallington is a small village and civil parish in the North Hertfordshire district of Hertfordshire, England. It lies 3 miles (5 km) east of the town of Baldock. Nearby villages include Rushden, with which it shares a parish council, and Sandon.

The Icknield Way Path passes through the village on its 110-mile journey from Ivinghoe Beacon in Buckinghamshire to Knettishall Heath in Suffolk. The author George Orwell lived in the village in the 1930s and 1940s.

== History ==
The village's name means "settlement belonging to Wændel", from Old English ing "belonging to" and tun "enclosure, town, yard".

== Buildings of interest ==
The Church of St Mary is a Grade II* listed building lying at the southern end of the village. The nave, west tower and windows date from the mid-15th Century. The chancel was rebuilt in 1864.

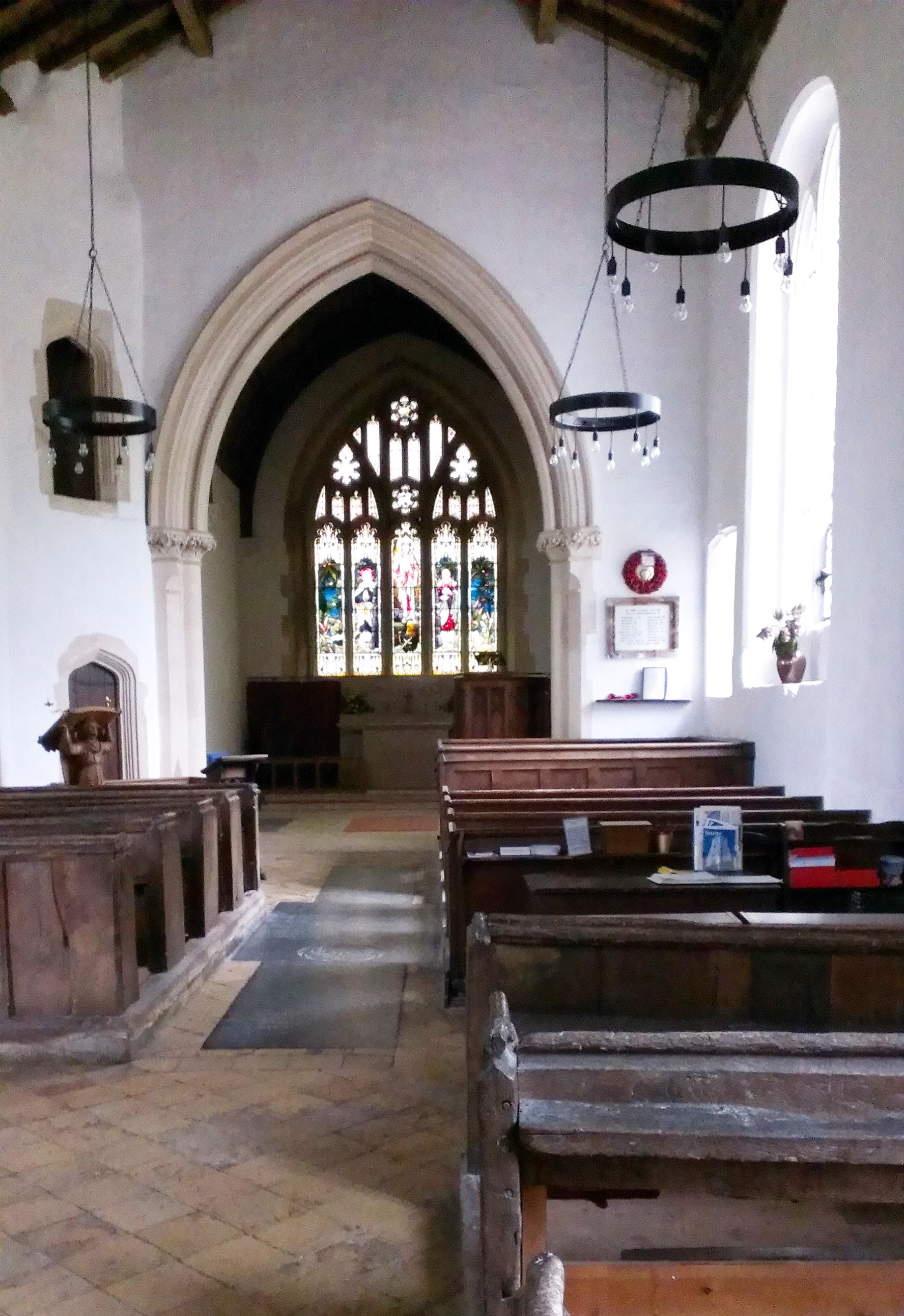
Interior view. Church of St Mary, Wallington.

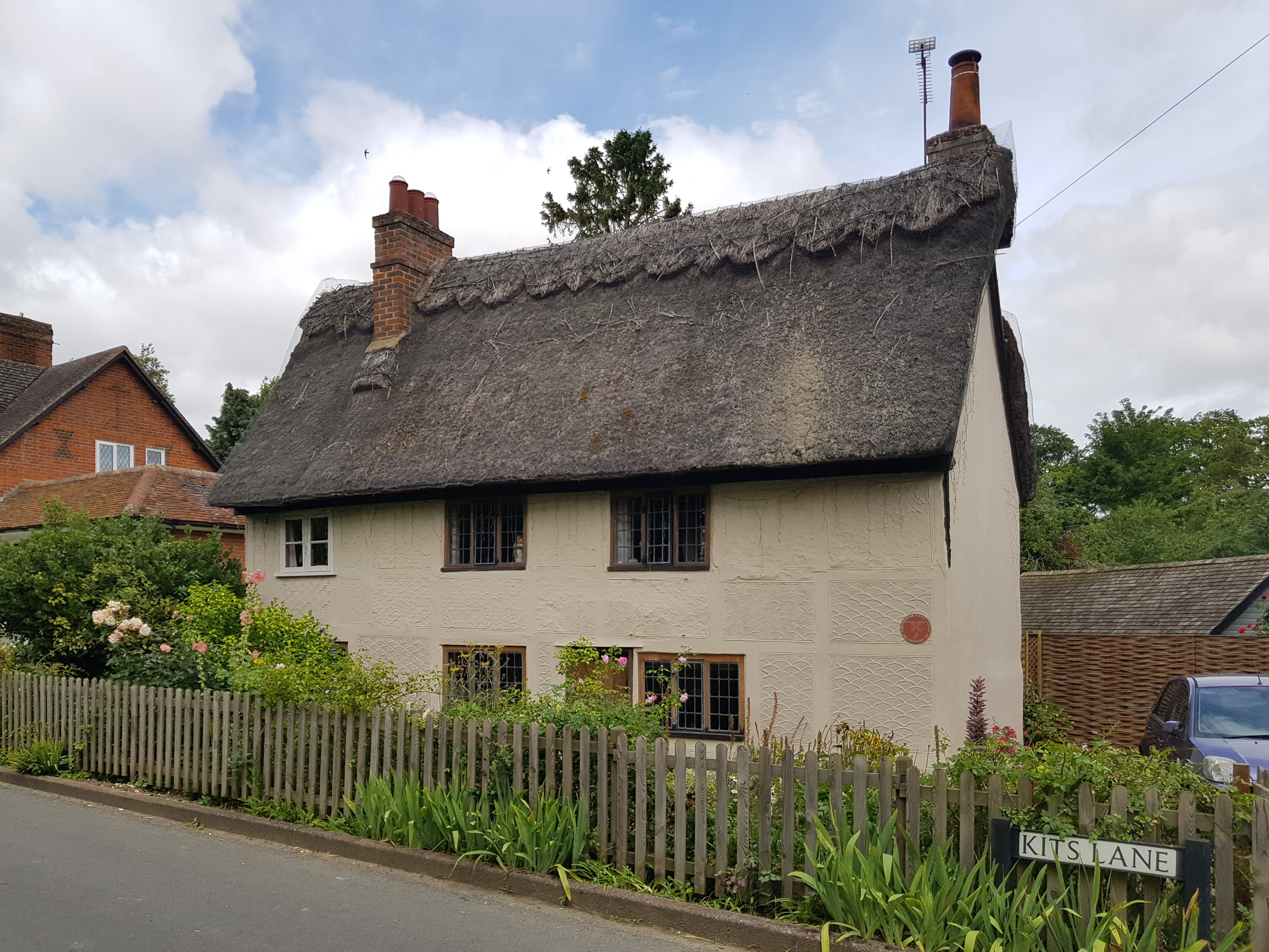
No 2 Kits Lane, Wallington. George Orwell residence circa 1936–1940

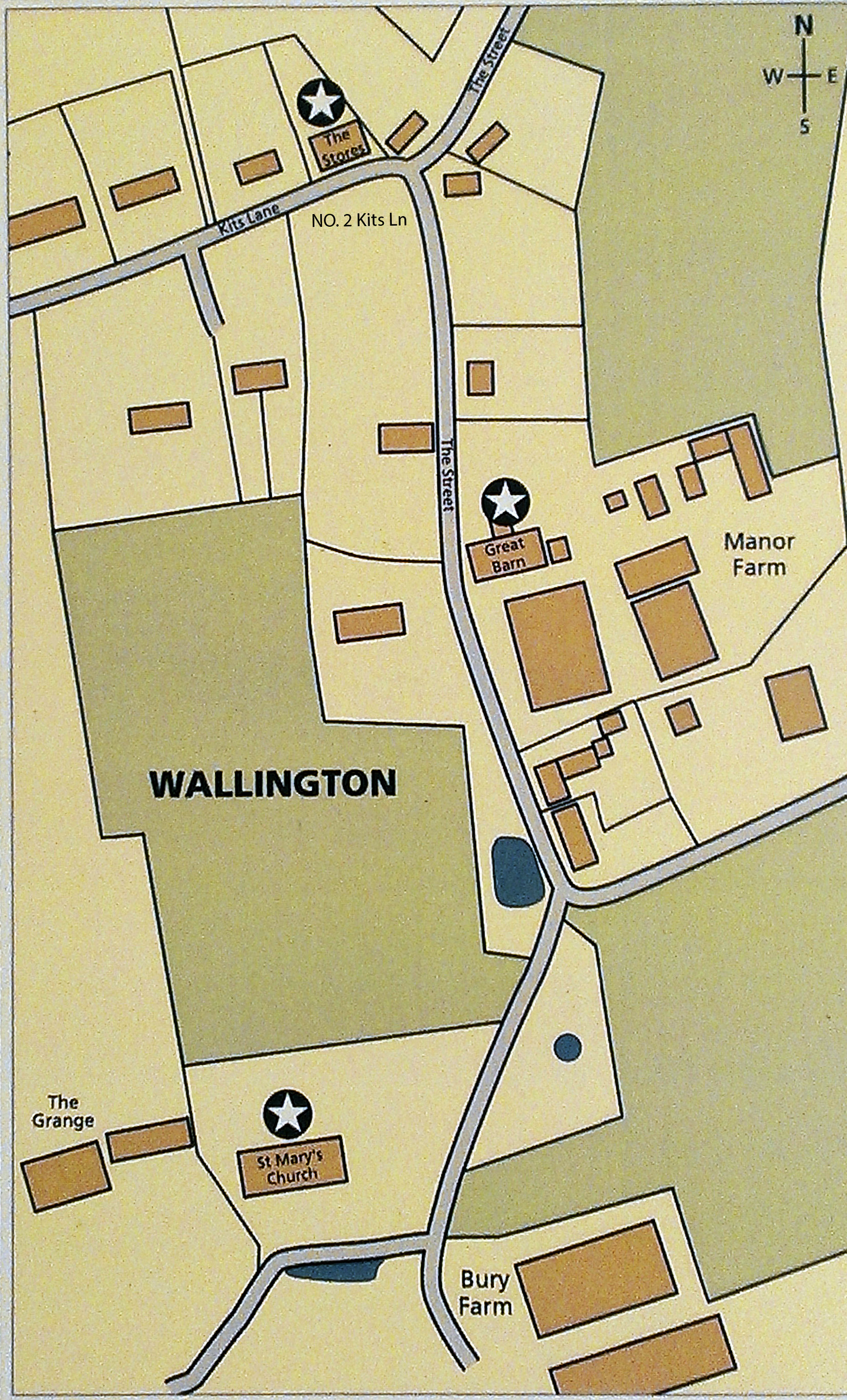
Map of Wallington

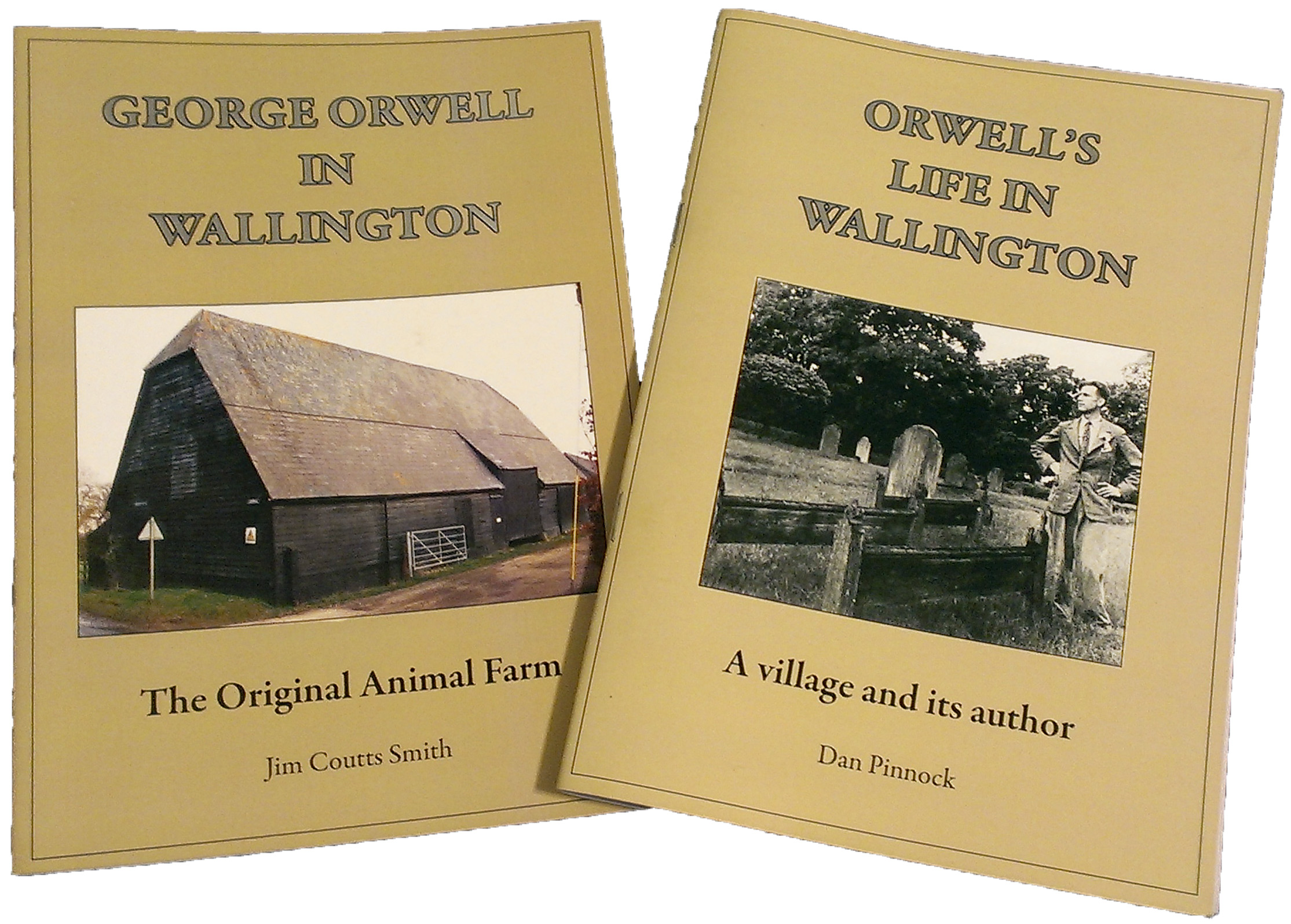
Booklets available at St Mary Church in 2013.

== George Orwell ==
The author George Orwell (real name Eric Blair) lived in a small cottage at no 2 Kits Lane, known as The Stores, in the village from 1936 to 1940, and at occasional weekends (when he was otherwise mainly in London) until he gave up the lease on the cottage in 1947. A commemorative plaque was placed there in 1989 by Hertfordshire County Council. This plaque is however not accurate, in that it refers to Orwell living at the Stores until 1940, whereas he had the lease until April 1947, and did stay at the house from time to time until at least the death of his first wife Eileen in 1945.

The house was owned by Frederick Dearman of 'Craigie House' in Weston, Hertfordshire. Orwell would walk from Wallington to Weston, to pay the 7s 6d rent. People in the village knew Orwell as simply 'Mr Blair'. Orwell grew vegetables on land opposite, owned by Mr Field, the postmaster of Sandon, and kept chickens and goats. Orwell had a general store, and post office, in the house open in the mornings.

He had married Eileen at the parish church on 9 June 1936. The wedding reception was at the pub next door, 'The Plough'. Orwell would go to the pub most evenings. 'The Plough' closed in the 1980s.

Orwell wrote his book Animal Farm in 1944, probably much of it while he was at the village and certainly drew on his experiences there for inspiration, especially Manor Farm and The Great Barn. The farm in the village is, as in the book called Manor Farm and in Animal Farm the village is 'Willingdon'.

Other books that he wrote while he lived in the village include Homage to Catalonia, Coming up for Air and The Road to Wigan Pier (which he had largely researched before he moved to Wallington, but which was written and published after his arrival). Many of his notable essays, reviews and articles in various journals and collections, were also written during this period.

In 1944 he moved to Carlton, County Durham to a house owned by his brother-in-law. He also lived at 27b Canonbury Square in north London.

The house was bought by Miss Esther Brookes, who lived there until 1987, a councillor on North Hertfordshire council, and the headteacher of the school at Sandon, Hertfordshire. In July 1997 the house was put up for £195,000 by the owner, artist Les Kitto, with his wife Elizabeth and two sons.

In 2011 the village was involved in the George Orwell Festival of Letchworth and Wallington.

== Governance ==
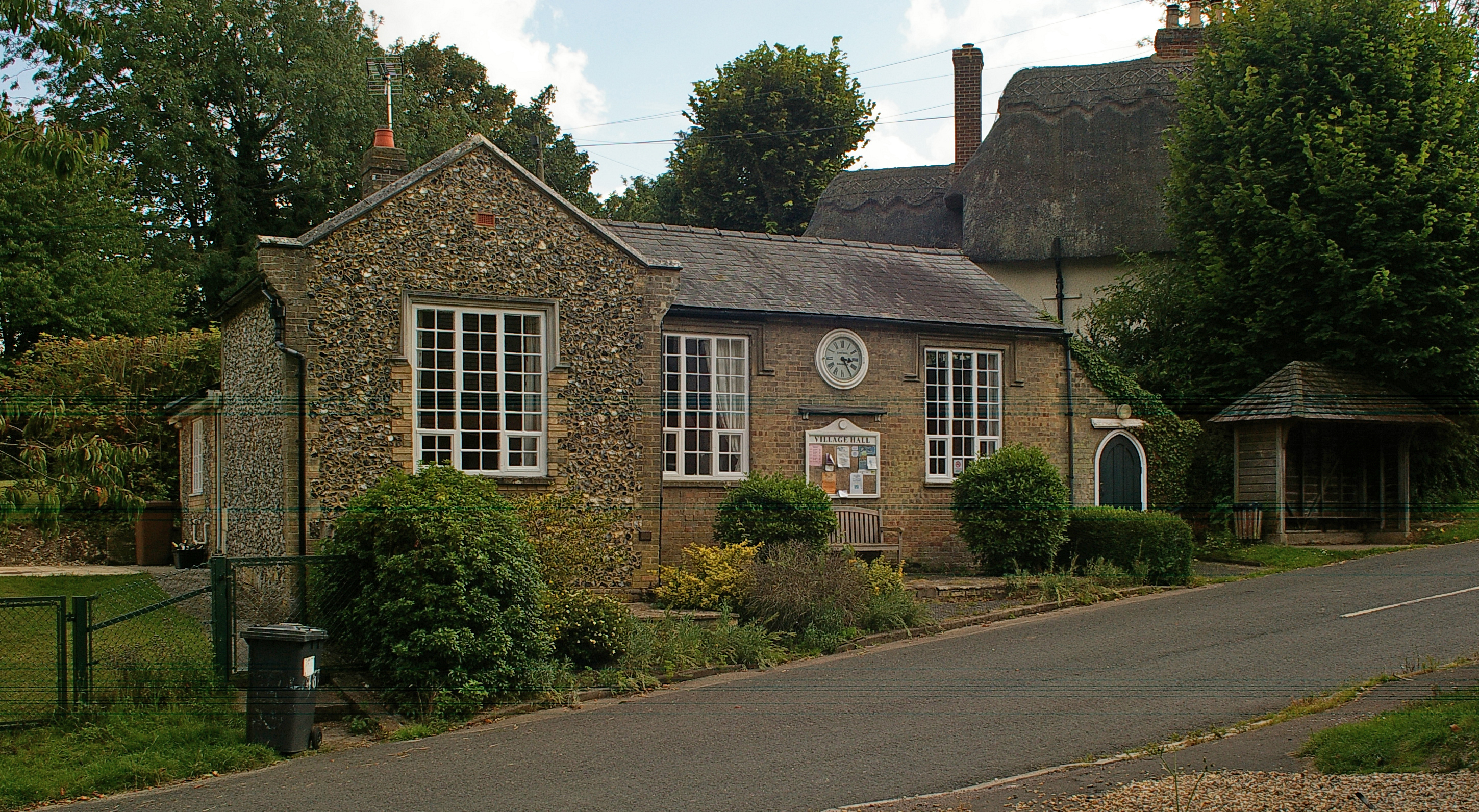
Wallington Village Hall

There are three tiers of local government covering Wallington, at parish, district, and county level: Rushden and Wallington Parish Council, North Hertfordshire District Council, and Hertfordshire County Council. The parish council is a grouped parish council, also covering the neighbouring parish of Rushden. The parish council holds its meetings alternately at Wallington Village Hall and Rushden Village Hall.

== Population ==
At the 2021 census the population of the parish was 137. The population had been 150 in 2011.
