= Tom Buchanan (historian) =

British historian

Tom Buchanan FRHistS
- Born: Thomas C. Buchanan; 1960 (age 65–66)
- Occupations: Historian and academic
- Title: Professor of Modern British and European History
- Spouse: Julia Lowndes
- Children: 3

Academic background
- Education: Wadham College, Oxford; St Antony's College, Oxford
- Thesis: British trade union internationalism and the Spanish Civil War (1987)
- Doctoral advisor: Frances Lannon

Academic work
- Discipline: History
- Sub-discipline: Political history; Military history
- Institutions: Kellogg College, Oxford

Thomas C. Buchanan FRHistS (born 1960) is a British historian. He has been a Fellow of Kellogg College, Oxford, since 1991, and in 2014 he was awarded the title of Professor of Modern British and European History by the University of Oxford. He specialises in foreign influences on British left-wing politics (particularly the Spanish Civil War and China); Catholic politics, conflict and peace in modern Europe; and humanitarianism in post-war Britain.

== Early life and education ==
Buchanan was born in 1960 to Angus and Brenda Buchanan. He studied history at Wadham College, Oxford, graduating with a BA in 1982. Buchanan then carried out doctoral studies at St Antony's College, Oxford; his DPhil was awarded in 1987 for his thesis "British trade union internationalism and the Spanish Civil War". His doctoral supervisor was Frances Lannon.

== Career ==
In 1990, Buchanan was appointed a University Lecturer in Modern History and Politics at the University of Oxford and Director of Studies for History and Politics at the Department for Continuing Education. Since 1991, he has also been a fellow of Kellogg College, Oxford. In 2014, he was awarded the title of Professor of Modern British and European History by the University of Oxford. Buchanan currently sits on the advisory council of the Institute of Historical Research.

== Personal life ==
Buchanan is married to Julia Lowndes. They have three sons together.

== Bibliography ==
- Buchanan, Tom (1991). The Spanish Civil War and the British Labour Movement. Cambridge: Cambridge University Press.
- Buchanan, Tom; Conway, Martin, eds. (1996). Political Catholicism in Europe, 1918–1965. Oxford: Oxford University Press.
- Buchanan, Tom (1997). Britain and the Spanish Civil War. Cambridge: Cambridge University Press.
- Buchanan, Tom (2006). Europe's Troubled Peace: 1945–2000. Oxford: Blackwell's.
- Buchanan, Tom (2007). The Impact of the Spanish Civil War on Britain: War, Loss and Memory. Brighton: Sussex Academic Press.
- Buchanan, Tom (2012). Europe's Troubled Peace: 1945–2000 (2nd ed.). Oxford: Wiley-Blackwell.
- Buchanan, Tom (2012). East Wind: China and the British Left, 1925-1976. Oxford: Oxford University Press.
- Pettifer, James; Buchanan, Tom (eds.). War in the Balkans: Conflict and Diplomacy before World War I. London: I. B. Tauris. ISBN 9781784531904.
- Buchanan, Tom (2020). Amnesty International and Human Rights Activism in Postwar Britain, 1945–1977. Cambridge: Cambridge University Press. ISBN 9781316422397.
- Buchanan, Tom (2024). Spain Mad: British Engagement in the Spanish Civil War. Liverpool University Press. ISBN 978-1-80207-549-6.
