= John McNair (British politician) =

British socialist politician

- Born: 6 October 1887; Boston, Lincolnshire
- Died: 18 February 1968 (aged 80)
- Occupation: Politician

John Leaf McNair (6 October 1887 – 18 February 1968) was a British socialist politician.

== Biography ==
McNair was born in Boston, Lincolnshire, but moved to Tyneside at an early age. He left school when he was thirteen, working as an errand boy. He joined the Independent Labour Party (ILP), and was involved in Victor Grayson's election campaigns in 1910, on one occasion having to fill for an entire evening when Grayson failed to arrive. In 1911, he moved to Coventry, in an attempt to find regular employment, but his political activity made this difficult, and so, later in the year, he moved to Paris, where he lived and worked until 1923. He worked as the London Organising Secretary for the ILP during the 1924 general election, but felt that this had harmed his health, and he returned to Paris, where he worked for the next twelve years.

In 1936, McNair again returned to the UK, and was appointed as the ILP's national Organising Secretary and international representative. In this post, he travelled to Spain with John McGovern, in order to investigate the role of the Catholic Church in the Spanish Civil War. When McGovern returned to Scotland, McNair remained in Barcelona, running the ILP's political office, and making arrangements for the arrival of British volunteers to fight with the POUM; these included George Orwell, whom McNair met on Orwell's arrival. Following the suppression of the POUM during the Barcelona May Days, he fled Spain with Orwell and two others.

McNair was elected as General Secretary of the ILP in 1939, in which capacity he evacuated the party offices to Glasgow. While holding the post, he stood in the 1943 Bristol Central by-election, taking 7.3% of the vote, and wrote an official biography of James Maxton, entitled The Beloved Rebel.

In 1945, he attended the 5th Pan-African Congress in Manchester representing the ILP; an event also attended by W. E. B. Du Bois and Kwame Nkrumah.

In 1955, McNair retired from the General Secretaryship, and returned to Tyneside, when he completed a degree at the University of Durham in French and English history, and Greek and Roman culture. Aged 72, he followed this with an MA, his thesis being on the work of Orwell.

Party political offices
Preceded by Fenner Brockway	General Secretary of the Independent Labour Party; 1939–1955	Succeeded by Wilfred Wigham
