= Gordon Bowker (writer) =

English journalist and academic (1934–2019)

Gordon Philip Bowker
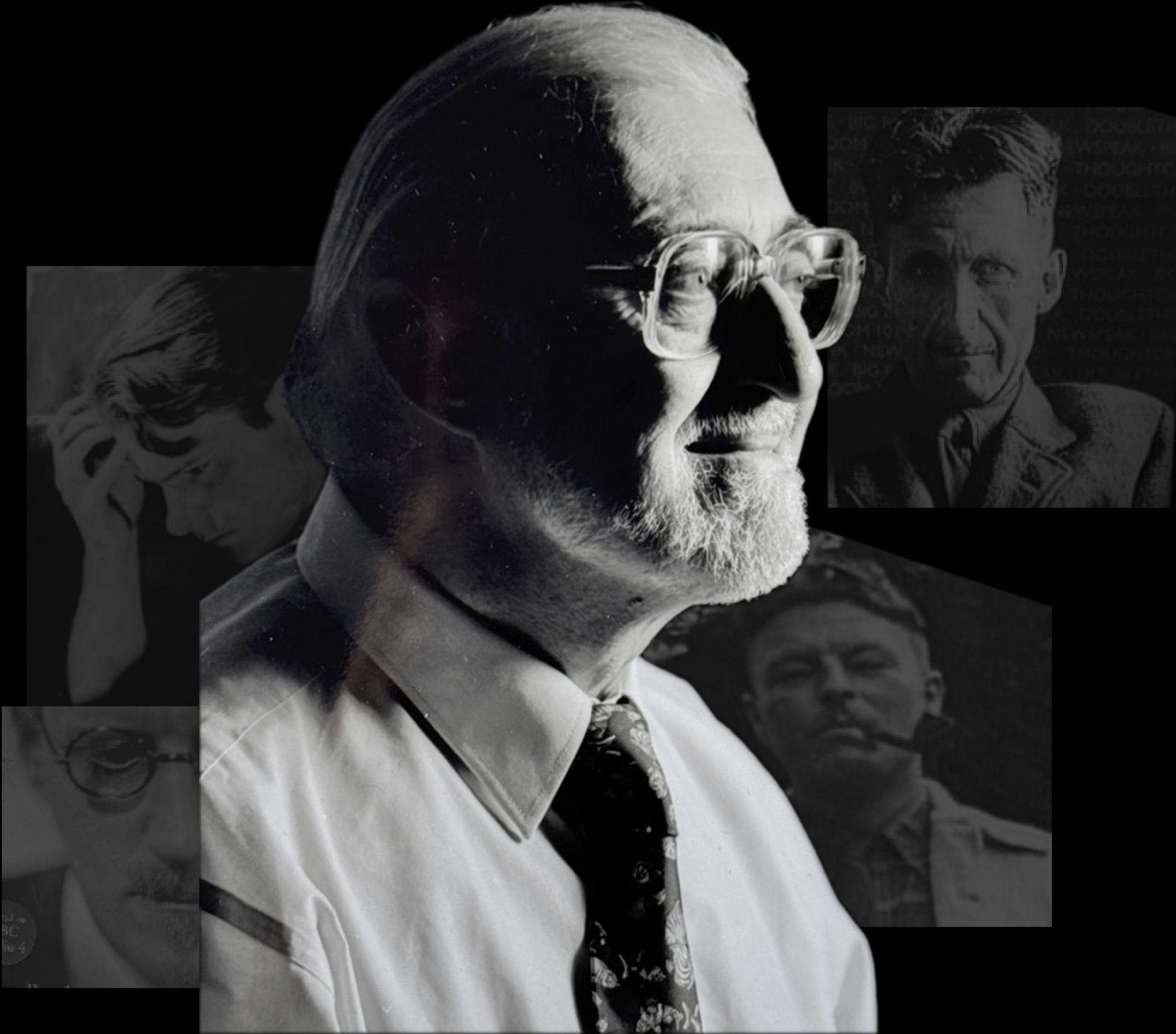
- Gordon Bowker
- Born: Gordon Philip Bowker; 1934
- Died: 14 January 2019 (aged 84–85)
- Occupations: Lecturer; journalist; biographer
- Spouse: Ramdei Rhoda Bowker
- Writing career
- Genre: Biography

Dr. Gordon Philip Bowker (Ph.D) (1934 – 14 January 2019) was an English journalist and academic who is noted for his literary biographies of Malcolm Lowry, Lawrence Durrell, George Orwell and James Joyce.

== Early life ==
Gordon Bowker was born in Birmingham in 1934 to Lucy Bowker (née Roberts) and a silent but disapproving father (Leonard Bowker) who was haunted by his participation in the Battle of the Somme during the First World War. Bowker grew up in a Birmingham devastated by bombing during the Second World War, where he attended grammar school at King Edward VI Camp Hill. At the age of 16, he struck out on his own by travelling to Australia for two years sheep farming, followed by three years in the RAF serving in Egypt and Cyprus.

Bowker had always wanted to write and saw teaching back in Birmingham as his pathway, qualifying from Saltley College in 1958, and from the University of Nottingham in 1960, where he read English, Sociology and Philosophy. (Note: Bowker completed his Ph.D in Sociology from the University of London in 1994) His parents relocated to Torquay, prompting Bowker to launch his teaching career at a school in Paignton. His time at Paignton was short-lived, and in 1961, Bowker arrived in London to seek his fortune. Within a few days he became critically ill and was hospitalised for the next four months in varying states of consciousness, slowly restoring himself back to physical and mental health, re-establishing his priorities, still determined to become a writer.

== Early career ==
Bowker emerged from hospital to embrace the "unbelievable present no longer suspended" in what was a vibrant Chelsea in the early nineteen sixties, immersing himself in the arts through theatre, music, poetry, cinema and publishing. In 1964, he landed his first job as a journalist for the Times Educational Supplement, (Note: Bowker continued writing commissioned articles for the Times Educational Supplement for the next twenty years) relying on part-time teaching to provide a steady income. Teaching progressed to a role as visiting lecturer around London's colleges and as a theatre critic, making connections with the art world and the literati, most notably Bernard Kops, Arnold Wesker, Jill Murphy, Henry Woolf, and B. S. Johnson.

By 1966, Bowker was able to quit teaching and took up a full time lectureship at Goldsmith's College, which he held until 1991. At the same time, he began writing dramas and documentaries for radio and television, as well as stories, articles and reviews for The Independent, The Observer, The Sunday Times, The Times Literary Supplement, The New York Times, Slightly Foxed, The London Magazine, Plays and Players, The Listener, The Times Educational Supplement and The Illustrated London News.

In 1967, Bowker published his first book as editor: Under Twenty, a collection of passages from novels, short stories and autobiographies. But he aspired to be a novelist, which required a steady income as an academic to fund his ambitions. (Note: From 1968, Bowker travelled to Canada every summer as a visiting professor, which provided much needed income to pay for his literary aspirations) It wasn't until 1978 that Bowker had created an outline to his first novel.

== Writing career ==
Over the next few years, Bowker wrote, and variously rewrote, his first novel in an effort to refine his craft and attract a publisher, but without success. (Note: Bowker completed two novels, which remain unpublished but he was never satisfied with them.) Instead, in 1982, he self-published a "Cynic's Dictionary", which he called Beelzebub’s Beastly Barbs, intended as an updating of Ambrose Bierce’s The Devil's Dictionary. Despite respectable sales of his dictionary, Bowker had already set his sights on biography following a conversation with Claire Tomalin, choosing, somewhat arbitrarily, Malcolm Lowry as his first subject. (Note: 1984 marked 75 years since Lowry's birth, a useful milestone to help frame radio and television broadcasts about Lowry's life, which were commissioned and which he wrote, setting the scene for his incipient biography)

=== Malcolm Lowry ===
Bowker immersed himself in researching Lowry, interviewing Malcolm Bradbury, Muriel Bradbrook, Anthony Burgess and Lowry's surviving brother Russell, as well as some Lowry school friends and his celebrated teacher William Balgarnie. The character of Geoffrey Firmin in Lowry's novel Under the Volcano was a useful source of auto-biographical material for Lowry enthusiasts, (Note: The part in Huston's 1984 movie was played by Albert Finney (interviewed by Bowker on set) whose portrayal was so convincing to his first wife Jan Gabrial, that she said of him "...it was exactly Malcolm as I knew him...") so that when Antony Burgess told Bowker that John Huston was to make a film of the novel in Mexico, he packed his bags and headed to the film set in Cuernavaca. His time in Mexico, which included opportunistic interviews with both Huston and Albert Finney, was followed with a visit to the home of Lowry's first wife Jan Gabrial in Encino, Los Angeles, which began a long term collaboration that was to last the rest of her life. Their relationship highlighted Bowker's capacity to source verifiable primary material on his subjects, which was to become his investigative signature. In 1985 Malcolm Lowry Remembered was published, which Bowker edited but his first complete biography (Pursued by Furies: A Life of Malcolm Lowry) wasn't published until 1993, ten years after he had begun researching Lowry. His first biography was well received, becoming a New York Times Best Seller and "Notable Book of the Year" in 1995. (Note: As with all his biographies, Bowker spent the rest of his life contributing to discussion and giving lecture tours featuring the life and works of Malcolm Lowry)

=== Lawrence Durrell ===
Months before Pursued by Furies was actually published, Bowker had moved his attention to his next biography featuring Lawrence Durrell. He had long admired Durrell initially for his poetry but also for his novels, and with his reputation as a biographer of note established by Pursued by Furies, he was quickly signed up under contract to deliver Through the Dark Labyrinth. As with Lowry, Bowker began his work on Durrell with a tight schedule of interviews from childhood acquaintances as well as friends like David Gascoyne, Sir Steven Runciman, John Craxton, Desmond Hawkins and family (4th wife Ghislaine Durrell), with visits to Corfu, Paris, Languedoc and Chicago. In just two years, Bowker had amassed a large volume of primary material for his new book, which he then set about turning into Through the Dark Labyrinth: a Biography of Lawrence Durrell. The book was published in 1996 and was controversial, attracting both positive and negative reviews. Bowker set his sights next on George Orwell but still hadn't given up on writing a novel, which continued to frustrate him. (Note: Bowker was writing a novel Crime and Punishment but once again, failed to find a publisher)

=== George Orwell ===
Bowker proposed a commemorative biography for George Orwell's centenary in 2003 but found that the acclaimed English writer DJ Taylor had already secured a contract scheduled for 2003. In 1997, Bowker launched his search for primary data on Orwell, whilst continuing to provide encouragement and support to Jan Gabrial's memoir of Lowry, which was published in 2000. The list of Orwell's friends and family included most notably publisher David Astor and Orwell's adopted son Richard Blair, (Note: list included Orwell's nieces Jane Morgan and Lucy Dakin, as well as Henry Dakin, Douglas Moyle, Quentin Kopp, Dione Venables, Susan Watson, Diana Witherby, David Sylvester, Dr Kenneth Sinclair Loutit, Fay Evans, Janetta Parladé, Adrian Fierz) once again compiling a sizeable legacy of primary material, which he was able to compress into his biography George Orwell. Bowker was surprised at how much fresh material he was able to unearth, despite his admission that "The ground of Orwell's life has been well dug over in the past", allowing him to shed new light on Orwell's sometimes contradictory behaviour.

Over the next few years, Bowker expanded his Orwell interests, promoting the republication of a book that revealed insights in to Orwell’s childhood (Eric & Us), and actively participating in the establishment of The Orwell Society, writing articles for The Orwell Foundation as well as Orwell Direct.

=== James Joyce ===
Bowker had long wanted to write about Joyce but had dismissed the idea because Ellmann's formidable biography could not be rivalled. (Note: Bowker wrote that he found Ellmann enormously impressive - describing him as "a quiet but charismatic figure". So when he prepared his biography on Malcolm Lowry, Ellmann seemed a good model to emulate) All his previous authors had been inspired in one way or another by Joyce, so Bowker began work before George Orwell had hit the shelves, travelling around Ireland, following Joyce's exile to Cosmopolitan Europe in Paris, Zurich, Trieste and London, attempting to tap into the flow of Joyce's consciousness amidst the wealth of scholarly distortions. Sorting through the relics of Joyce's life for Bowker was like "sorting through the tangled wreckage of a deserted house - windows shattered, rooms in chaos, bits of broken furniture, smashed china, books and papers torn and scattered, smithereens of mirrors bouncing back flashes of fractured sunlight and fragmented images". But even amidst such chaos, Bowker managed to salvage enough to reconstruct an approximation to the man himself, publishing James Joyce: a New Biography in 2011, which was also considered controversial, attracting both supporters and detractors.

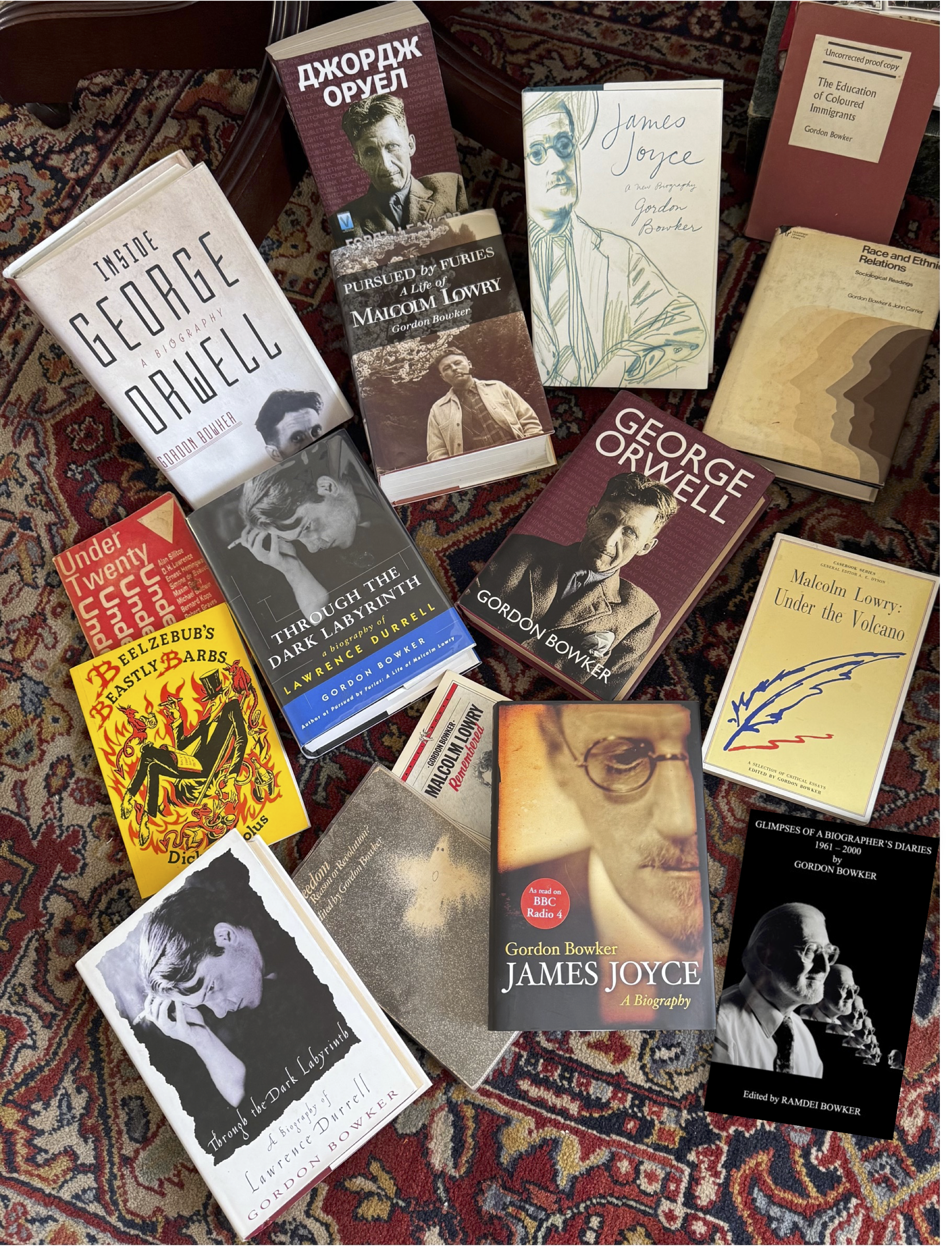
Selection of Gordon Bowker's published books

== Legacy ==
Bowker's literary biographies (1993, 1996, 2003 and 2011) were all large volumes filled with detailed primary material offering new insights into the lives of his subjects, all of whom he saw as exiles. Each book required significant travelling and collecting with his wife, and as ever the research process threatened to be an end in itself. But each time Bowker pushed his authors' narrative forward and was not afraid to walk on hallowed ground trodden by countless scholars, enthusiasts and believers before him. He also reached down as far as possible into the emotional roots of their lives, tapping into dark sources often mirrored in their literary work. These biographies remain essentially controversial for as long as there is interest in the lives of Lowry, Durrell, Orwell or Joyce and for as long as writers retain the capacity "to tell people what they do not want to hear". (Note: the full quote attributed Orwell in an unused preface to Animal Farm reads "If liberty means anything at all, it means the right to tell people what they do not want to hear")

In 2022, the Society of Authors initiated a new annual prize called the Gordon Bowker Volcano Prize, awarded to two writers who present novels "focusing on the experience of travel away from home", endowed by Bowker's widow, named for Malcolm Lowry's novel Under the Volcano.

In 2025, Bowker's widow published his unfinished memoir, which is divided into two parts starting with his early career as teacher, lecturer and journalist, concluding with his biographical career.

=== Selected publications ===
- 1966 – Under Twenty (editor) paperback (Routledge and Kegan Paul, London)
- 1970 - Freedom: Reason or Revolution hardback (Routledge and Kegan Paul, London)
- 1976 - Race and Ethnic Relations: Sociological Readings (editor) hardback (Hutchinson, London)
- 1982 - Beelzebub’s Barbs: A Cynic’s Dictionary (pen name:Diabolus) hardback (Diabolus Press, London)
- 1985 - Malcolm Lowry Remembered (editor) paperback (Ariel books BBC, London)
- 1987 - Malcolm Lowry Under the Volcano – A Selection Of Critical Essayspaperback (MacMillan Education, London)
- 1993 - Pursued by Furies: A Life of Malcolm Lowry hardback and paperback (Harper Collins, London)
- 1996 - Through the Dark Labyrinth: a Biography of Lawrence Durrell hardback and paperback (Sinclair-Stevenson, London), 1997 hardback and paperback (St. Martin’s Press, New York), 1998 paperback (Pimlico, London), 2018 eBook (Endeavour Press)
- 2003 - George Orwell hardback (Little, Brown, London), Inside George Orwell: A Biography hardback (Pallgrave Macmillan, New York), 2004 paperback (Abacus)
- 2011 - James Joyce. A Biography hardback (Weidenfeld and Nicolson, London), 2012 hardback (Farrar, Straus and Giroux, New York)
- 2025 - Glimpses of a Biographer’s Diaries, 1961 – 2000 edited by Ramdei Bowker, ebook (Kindle)
