= The Orwell Society =

Literary society and charitable organisation

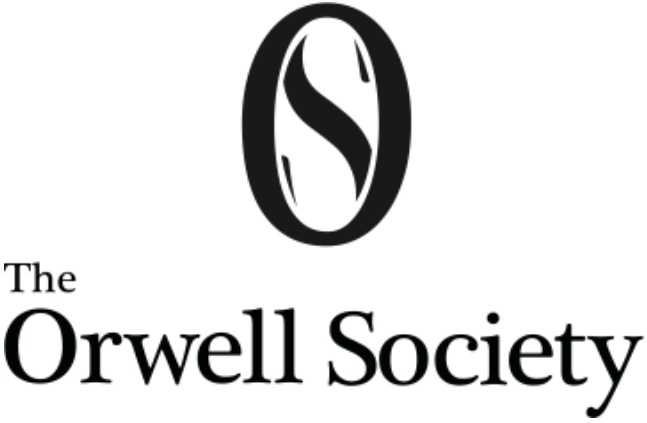
- Founded: 4 April 2011; 15 years ago
- Founder: Dione Venables
- Type: NGO
- Registration no.: 1159072
- Legal status: Charity
- Purpose: The life and works of George Orwell
- Region served: England
- Patron: Richard Blair
- Revenue: £11,749 (2019)
- Expenses: £10,379 (2019)
- Website: orwellsociety.com

The Orwell Society is a literary society and a UK registered charity. It was founded in 2011 with the aim of promoting the understanding and appreciation of the life and work of George Orwell (the pen name of Eric Arthur Blair 1903–1950). Its patron is Richard Blair, George Orwell's adopted son.

The society has no political affiliation and does not speculate on what Orwell might have thought of current political issues were he alive today.

== History ==
In 2006 the late Dione Venables, of Finlay Publishers, published a revised edition of Eric & Us, a memoir written by Jacintha Buddicom who died in 1993. The book was originally published in 1974 by Leslie Frewin and focused on Eric Blair's childhood and teenage years. Buddicom was Venables' first cousin who left Venables the copyrights to the book in her will. The acclaimed Orwell biographer, Gordon Bowker, in agreeing to review the book, suggested certain clarifications and in late 2006, Eric & Us: The Postscript Edition was published.

The postscript edition was regularly discussed on a website called "Orwell Direct", creating a small community of enthusiasts whose first contributor was Sir Bernard Crick. The community, which included Orwell's adopted son Richard Blair, began to ask why there was no Society to promote the life and works of George Orwell, prompting Venables to focus her efforts on constituting one.

On 27 December 2010, a group gathered for the first informal meeting at Phyllis Court, Henley-on-Thames (which the young Eric Blair had often visited). The day was hosted by Venables and, of those attending that day, Christopher Edwards agreed to be the society's first Chair. Richard Blair accepted the role as Patron, Charles Wiggin as Treasurer, Dominic Cavendish took on the editorship of the society's website, and Venables agreed to be Membership Secretary. Later on, Ron Bateman took on the Secretary role and Chris Organ was appointed to provide legal input.

The formal inaugural meeting was held on 19 April 2011 and in the same year, Quentin Kopp, whose father Georges Kopp had been Orwell's commandant and friend during and after the Spanish Civil War, joined the committee as Events Secretary and the society was launched. On 28 April 2012, The Society held its first Annual General Meeting at Senate House, London, next to Room 101, made famous in Nineteen Eighty-Four.

== Charitable purpose ==
The Society has a charitable purpose to advance education about Orwell's life and work for the public benefit. This is achieved through a number of student bursaries and prizes, as well as memorials and commemorative plaques. The society also organises a number of member events including to Spain (to visit sites that feature in Homage to Catalonia, Orwell's memoir of the Spanish Civil War) and to the island of Jura, where Orwell completed the final draft of Nineteen Eighty-Four.

Some historical antipathy towards George Orwell from the people of Wigan was rectified in 2017, 80 years after the publication of The Road to Wigan Pier, by demonstrating that Orwell had not been critical of Wigan people. Richard Blair participated as one of the narrators in "Beyond Wigan Pier", an opera first performed in 2018, aimed at attracting funding for students to attend Music & Drama school.

== Governance ==
The Orwell Society is currently governed by nine elected trustees, who administer the UK registered charity. Current trustees are

1. Patron – Richard Blair
2. Chair – Quentin Kopp
3. Secretary – Chris Harrison
4. Treasurer – Mark Courtenay
5. Journal Editor – Masha Karp
6. Education – Ian Bloom
7. Information and Web Presence – Les Hurst
8. Publicity – Benedict Cooper

=== Annual General Meeting (AGM) ===
The Society's Annual AGM is typically held towards the end of April, usually at a location in London, each featuring a notable guest speaker. The first AGM in 2012 was held at Senate House, London, when an Honorary Life Membership was awarded to Professor Peter Davison for his unparalleled contribution towards the editing and publication of Orwell's work, including the twenty-volume The Complete Works of George Orwell.

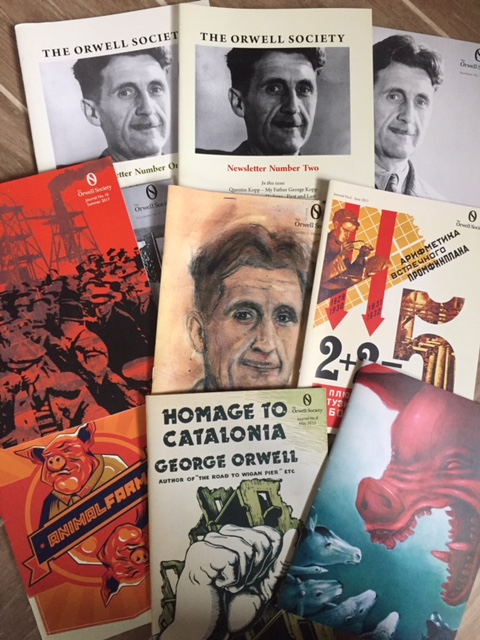
A Selection of Society Publications

== Publications ==
The twice-yearly Society Journal started out as the annual 'Newsletter,' the first two editions being edited and designed by Ron Bateman and Christopher Edwards. In 2013, Ron Bateman took over the editorship of the publication, which was renamed, "The Orwell Society Journal". He stepped down as editor in 2016 to be replaced by Masha Karp. In 2015, Dione Venables published the first collection of George Orwell's Poetry, which was approved for public release a few months later, with all proceeds from the book being donated to the society.

== Orwell Statue ==
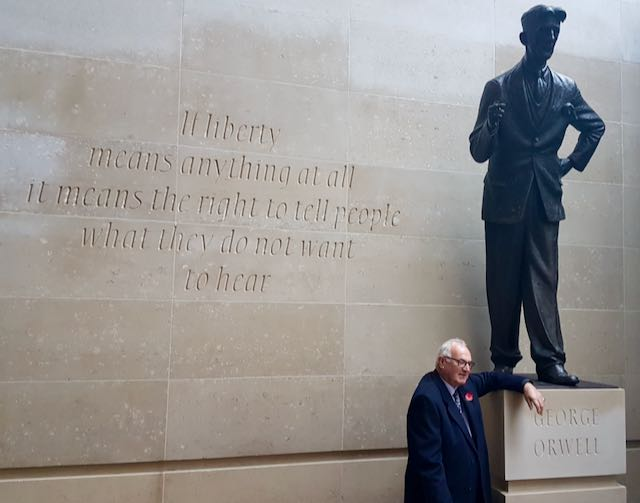
Richard Blair at the unveiling of the Statue of George Orwell outside Broadcasting House, 2017

On 7 November 2017, a statue of Orwell sculpted by Martin Jennings, was unveiled outside Broadcasting House. The idea for the statue and its location came from Ben Whitaker MP who created a Trustee Board of distinguished people to raise the money. Following Ben Whitaker's death in 2014, the fund raising was completed by his widow Baroness Janet Whitaker and the sculpture was commissioned after securing the commitment of the BBC. Baroness Whitaker and Richard Blair delivered short speeches before unveiling the Statue.

The wall behind the statue is engraved with the words: "If liberty means anything at all, it means the right to tell people what they do not want to hear", a quote attributed to Orwell's proposed preface to Animal Farm. Baroness Whitaker and the Trustee Board invited The Orwell Society to take over ownership of the Statue. The handover was completed in 2021.
