= Masha Karp =

Russian author, journalist, and translator (born 1956)

- Мария Поэлевна Карп
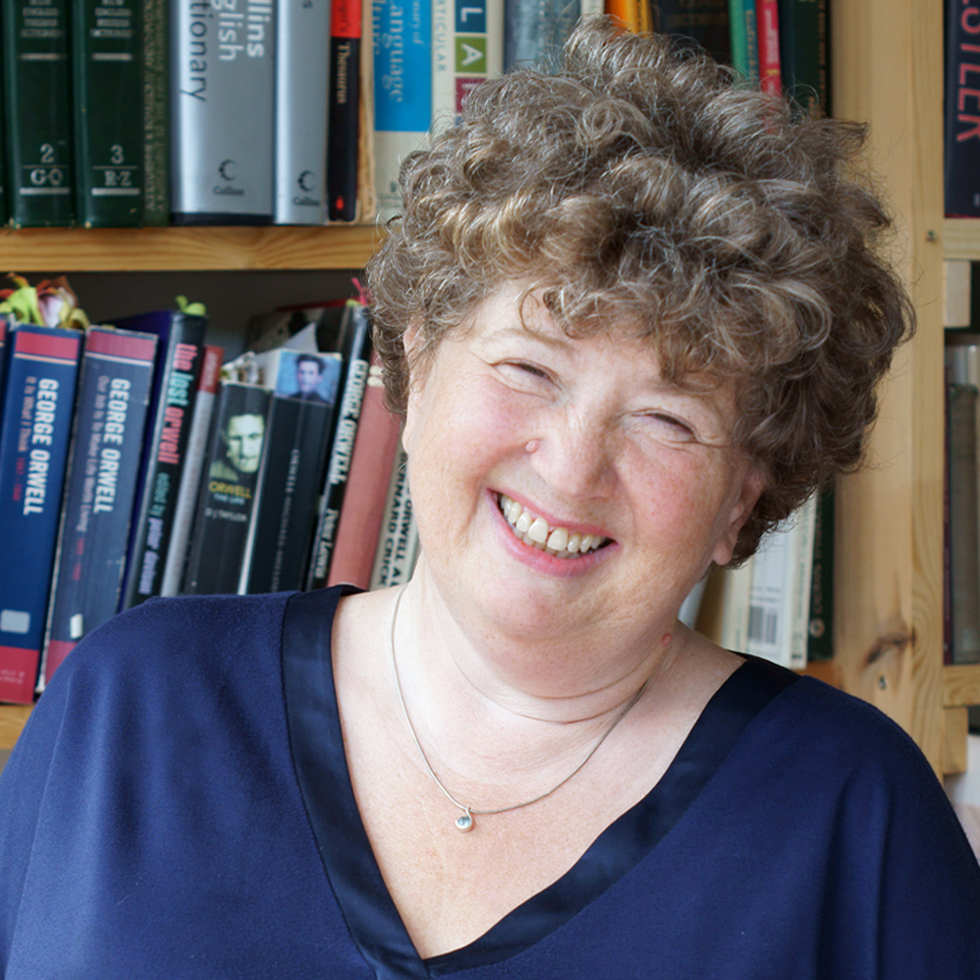
- Born: 3 September 1956; Leningrad (now Saint Petersburg), USSR
- Education: Herzen University
- Occupations: Author, Translator, Journalist
- Writing career
- Language: English, Russian

Masha Karp is a political journalist and a scholar on the work of George Orwell. She is the author of two books about Orwell: his biography, in Russian (2017) and George Orwell and Russia, in English (2023). She is also a translator of English and German literature into Russian, a literary critic and a former BBC editor.

== Early life and career ==
Masha Karp was born on 3 September 1956 in Leningrad, USSR (now St Petersburg, Russia). Her father Poel Karp (Карп, Поэль Меерович) is a poet, literary translator, ballet critic and political writer. Masha was educated as a linguist at the Herzen University in Leningrad.

She started as a translator of English and German poetry and prose into Russian and has published translations of many writers, including Virginia Woolf, Alice Munro, Dylan Thomas, W. H. Auden, Tom Stoppard, Elizabeth Jennings, Andreas Gryphius and Nikolaus Lenau. She also translated George Orwell’s fable Animal Farm and its original preface "The Freedom of the Press".

== Journalism ==
In 1991, she moved to London to work first as a producer (1991-1997) and then as the Russian Features editor (1997-2009) for the BBC World Service, making and commissioning programmes on cultural, political and social issues. She also took part in BBC Radio 4 and BBC World Service radio output in English and in the live BBC World Television show Europe Direct.

Since 2009, she has been a freelance journalist with a special interest in relations between Russia and the West. This was the main subject of her articles published in the national press (Standpoint, The Independent, The Spectator, Open Democracy, etc.)

== George Orwell ==
George Orwell’s life and work and its relevance to Russia has always remained in the centre of Masha’s attention. Her biography of Orwell (Vita Nova, 2017), the first scholarly biography of the writer to be published in Russia, was a finalist of the ABS Literary Prize.

Masha Karp is a member of the board of The Orwell Society and the editor of the Orwell Society Journal.

Karp's new book George Orwell and Russia (Bloomsbury, 2023) has received wide critical acclaim. It was positively reviewed, inter alia, by The Times Literary Supplement, Forbes, and The Boston Globe. The book attracted the attention of veteran diplomat Rodric Braithwaite, who served for a short time as British Ambassador in Moscow during the fall of the USSR, he found the author's analysis unconvincing. On the other hand, another diplomat, Bob Rae, the permanent representative of Canada in the UN, called the book "brilliant." The socialist movement press also reacted very positively.

== Public activity ==
In Britain, Masha Karp is the Chair of the Pushkin Club and a trustee of Rights in Russia, while in Russia she is a member of St. Petersburg Writers' Union and the Literary Translators' Guild.

== Awards ==
Inostrannaya Literatura Literary Prize, translation of Virginia Woolf (1991)

Popov Prize, radio feature "In Defence of Freedom" (2001)

== Books ==
- Masha Karp (2023). George Orwell and Russia (1st ed.). United Kingdom: Bloomsbury Publishing. p. 312. ISBN 9781788317139.
- Masha Karp (2017). George Orwell, Biography (in Russian) (1st ed.). Saint Petersburg: ru:Вита Нова. p. 608. ISBN 978-5-93898-642-8.

== Videos ==
- Orwell and Russia - Part 1: Masha Karp. Orwell foundation. on YouTube
- Masha Karp Discusses Orwell and the Soviets. At Foreign Press Association USA. on YouTube

== Selected articles ==
- Karp, Masha (25 August 2009). "Far away from Moscow". OpenDemocracy.
- Karp, Masha (16 March 2010). "Arthur Koestler: 20th century man". OpenDemocracy.
- Karp, Masha (2 July 2010). "Living Souls, By Dmitry Bykov, trans. Cathy Porter. Reviewed by Masha Karp". The Independent.
- Karp, Masha (12 December 2010). "Doctor Zhivago, By Boris Pasternak, trans. Richard Pevear and Larissa Volokhonsky. Reviewed by Masha Karp". The Independent.
- Karp, Masha (21 June 2011). "Forbidden art: an oasis in the desert". OpenDemocracy.
- Karp, Masha (19 February 2013). "Marina Goldovskaya: documenting modern Russia". OpenDemocracy.
- Karp, Masha (2016). "A wit wooed by Rasputin. Masha Karp enjoys the writings of a satirist shaken by the Red terror". The World Today. Chatham House.
- Karp, Masha (5 February 2022). "Found and Lost". The Orwell Society.
