= The Echoing Green =

1780 poem by William Blake

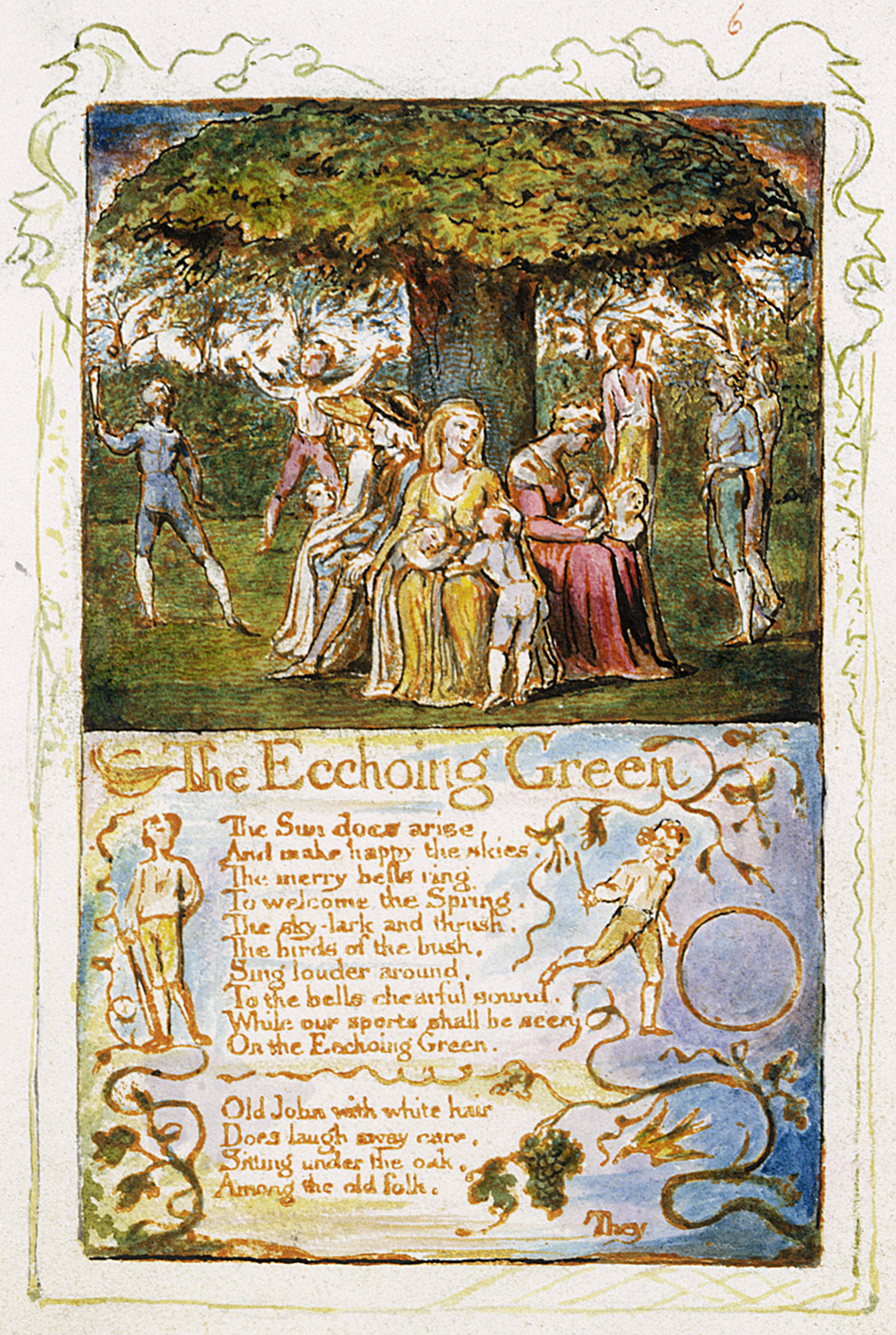
Songs of Innocence and of Experience, copy Y, 1825 (Metropolitan Museum of Art) object 6 (The Echoing Green 1)

"The Echoing Green" (The Ecchoing Green) is a poem by William Blake published in Songs of Innocence in 1789. The poem talks about merry sounds and images which accompany the children playing outdoors. Then, an old man happily remembers when he enjoyed playing with his friends during his own childhood. The last stanza depicts the little ones being weary when the sun has descended and going to their mother to rest after playing many games.

== The poem ==
Reading of "The Echoing Green"

The Sun does arise,
And make happy the skies.
The merry bells ring
To welcome the Spring.

The sky-lark and thrush,
The birds of the bush,
Sing louder around,
To the bells' cheerful sound.
While our sports shall be seen
On the Echoing Green.

Old John with white hair
Does laugh away care,
Sitting under the oak,
Among the old folk,
They laugh at our play,
And soon they all say.
Such such were the joys.
When we all --girls and boys--
In our youth-time were seen,
On the Echoing Green.

Till the little ones weary
No more can be merry
The sun does descend,
And our sports have an end:
Round the laps of their mothers,
Many sisters and brothers,
Like birds in their nest,
Are ready for rest;
And sport no more seen,
On the darkening Green.

== Gallery ==
Scholarly editions all place "The Echoing Green" as the sixth object in the print order for the Songs of Innocence and of Experience. The following, represents a comparison of several of the extant copies of the poem, their print date, their order in that particular printing of the poems, and their holding institution:

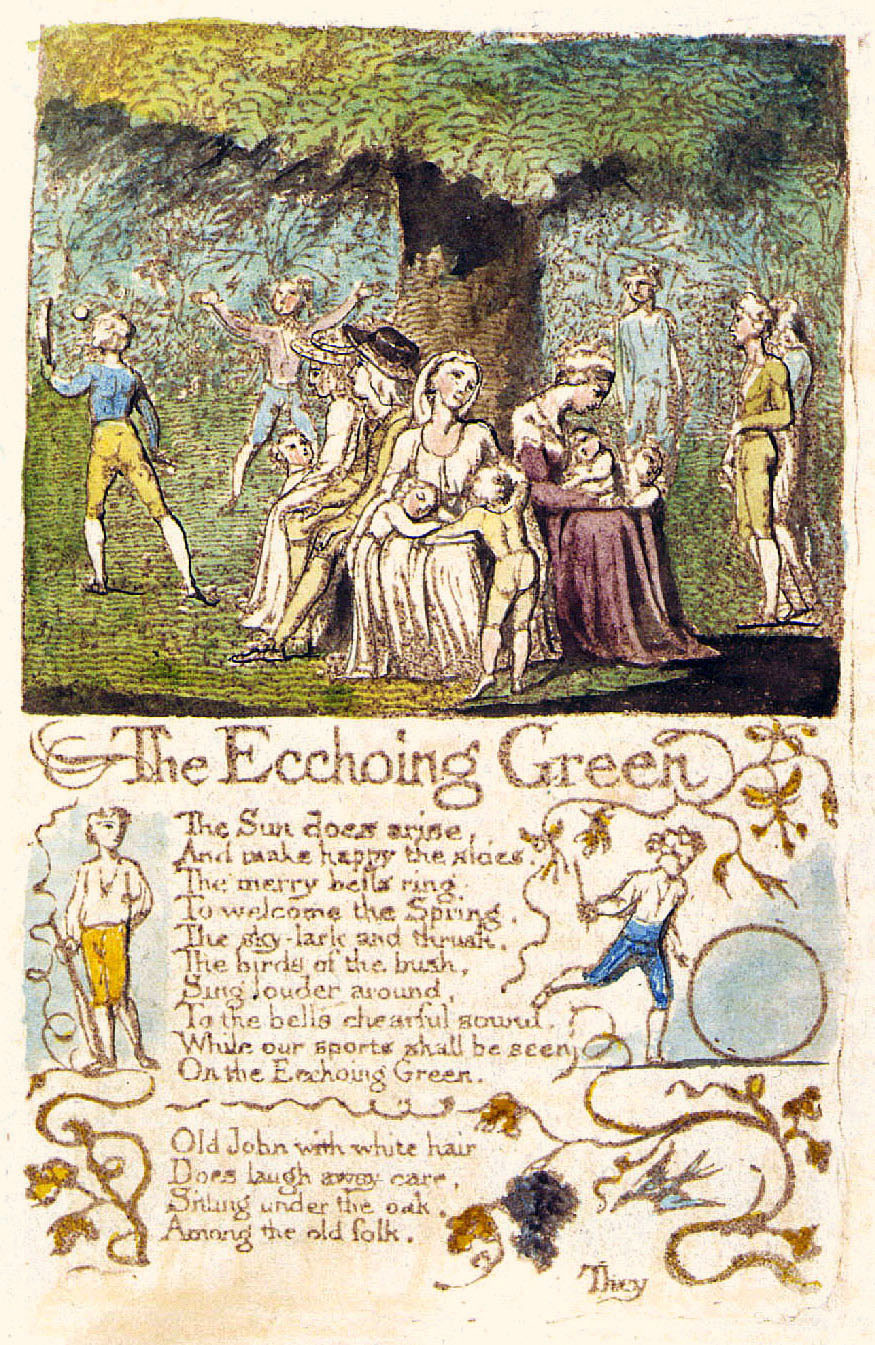
Copy C, 1789, 1794 (Library of Congress) object 13 (The Echoing Green 1)

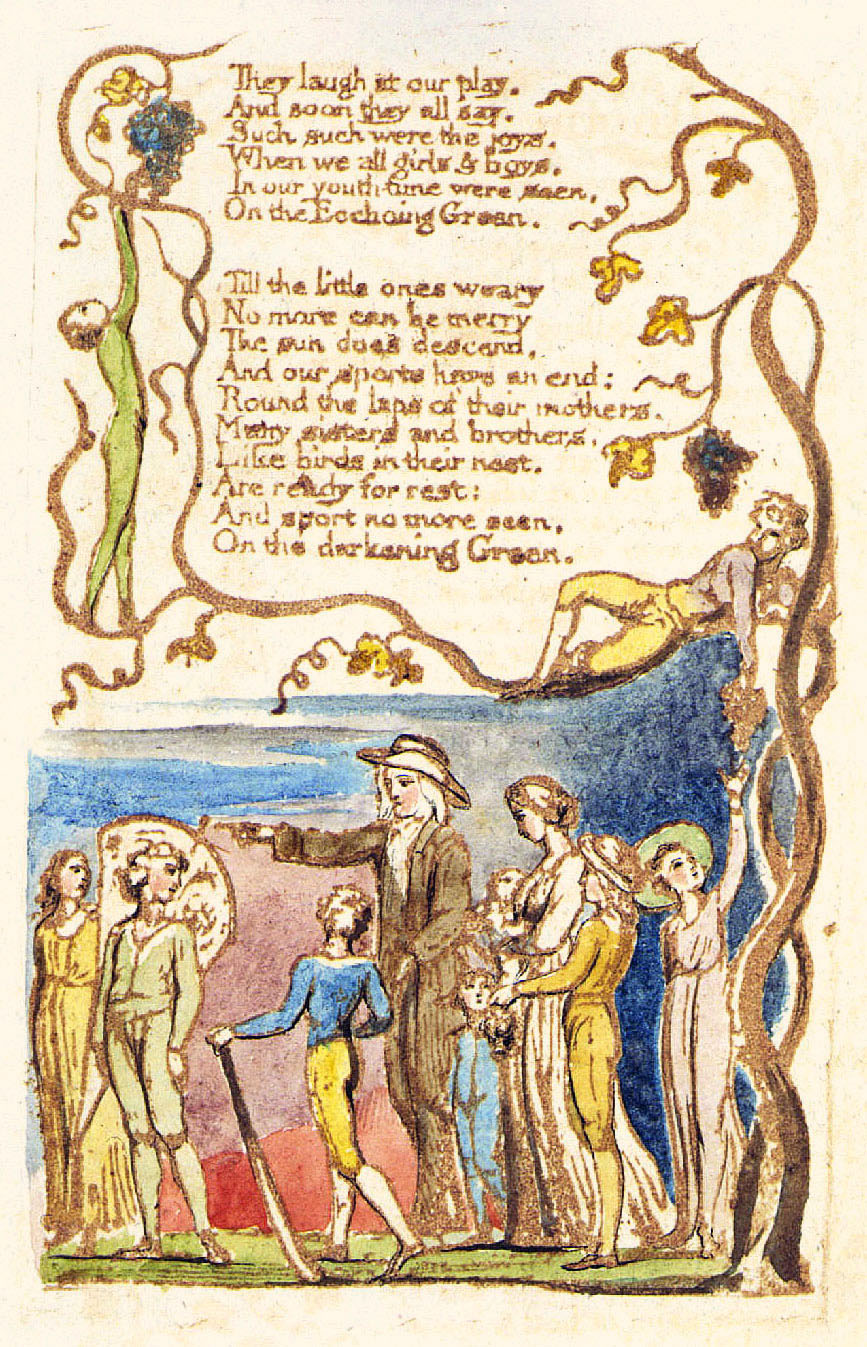
Copy C, 1789, 1794 (Library of Congress) object 14 (The Echoing Green 2)

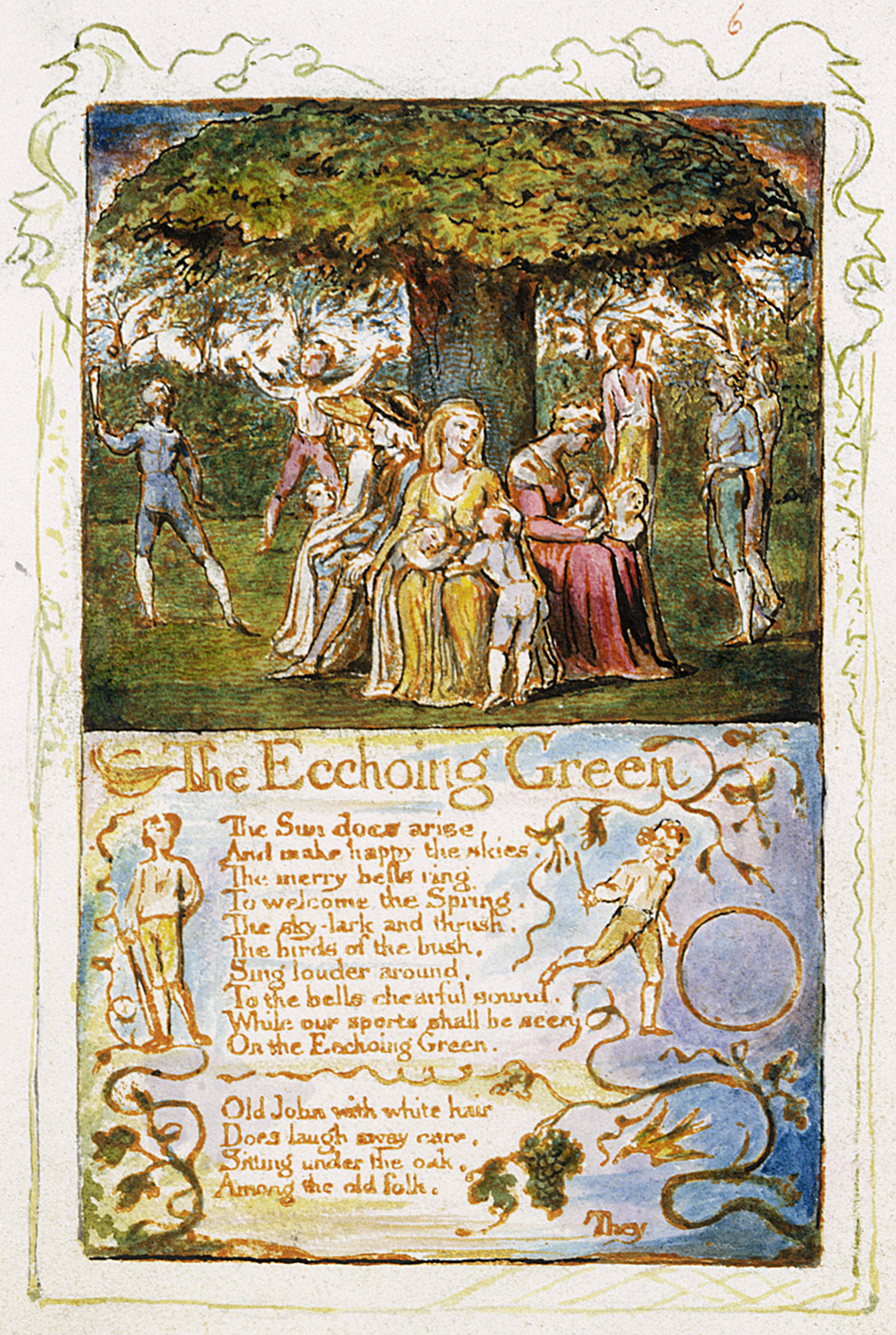
Copy Y, 1825 (Metropolitan Museum of Art) object 6 (The Echoing Green 1)

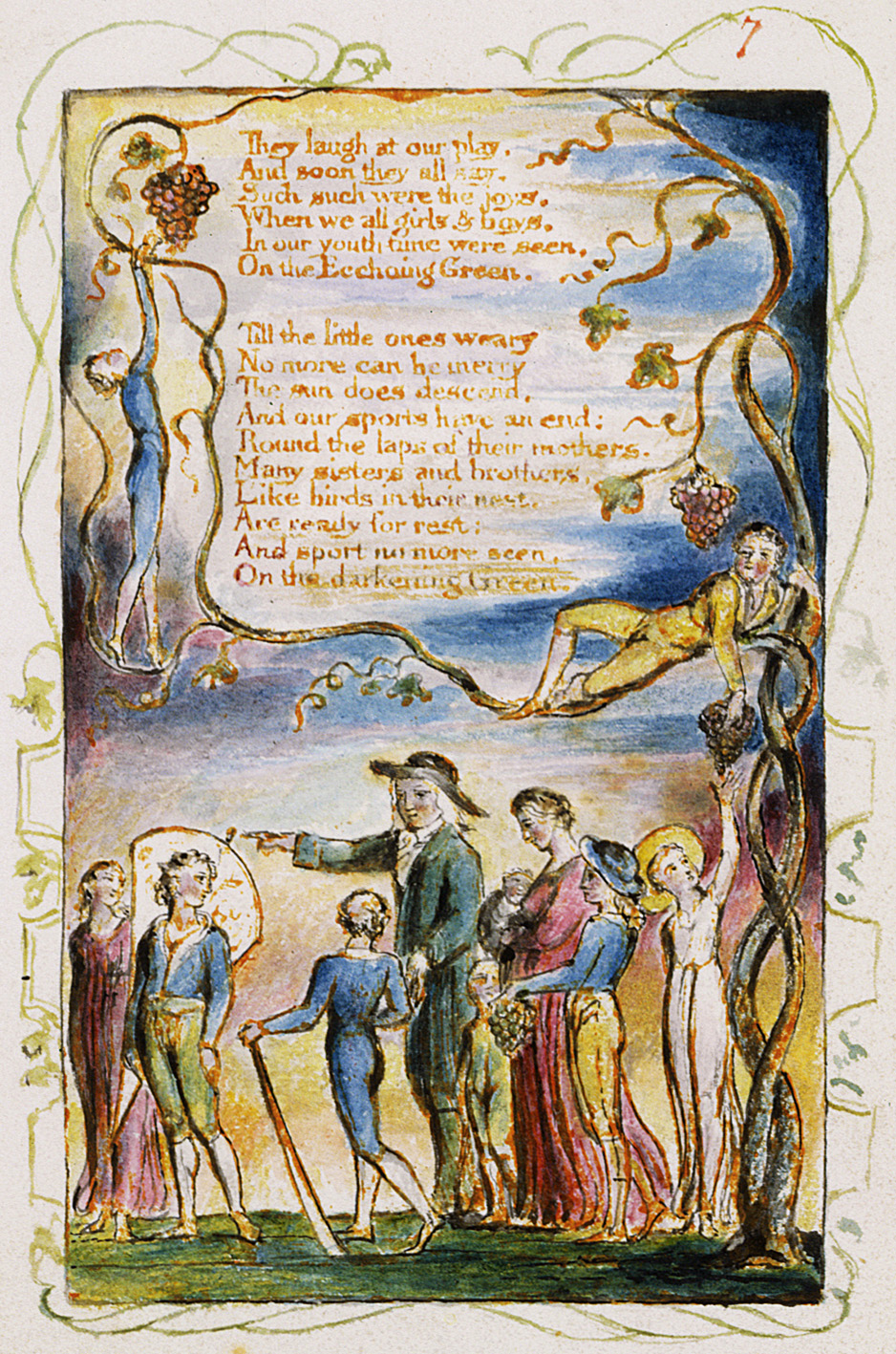
Copy Y, 1825 (Metropolitan Museum of Art) object 7 (The Echoing Green 2)

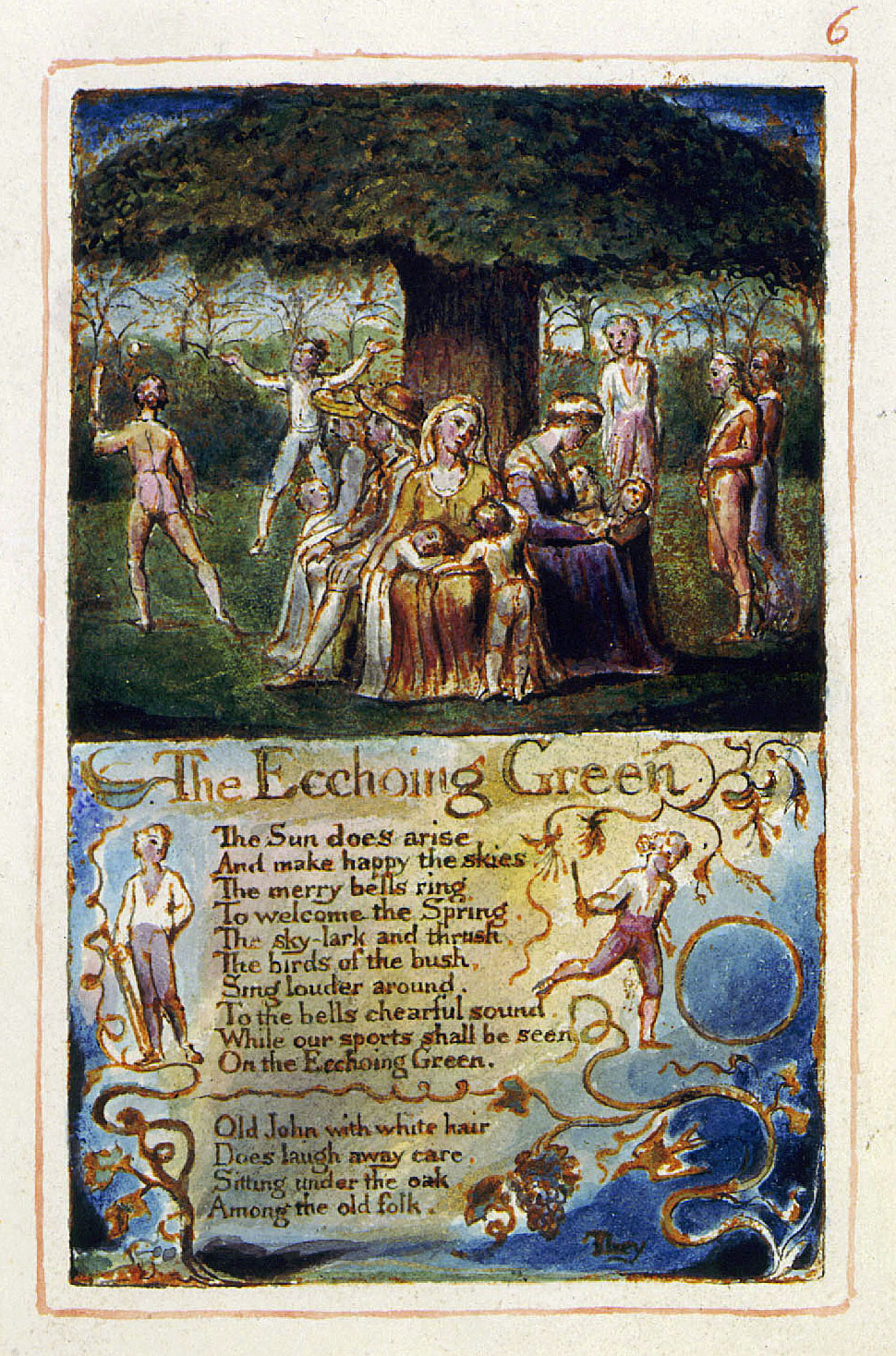
Copy Z, 1826 (Library of Congress) object 6 (The Echoing Green 1)

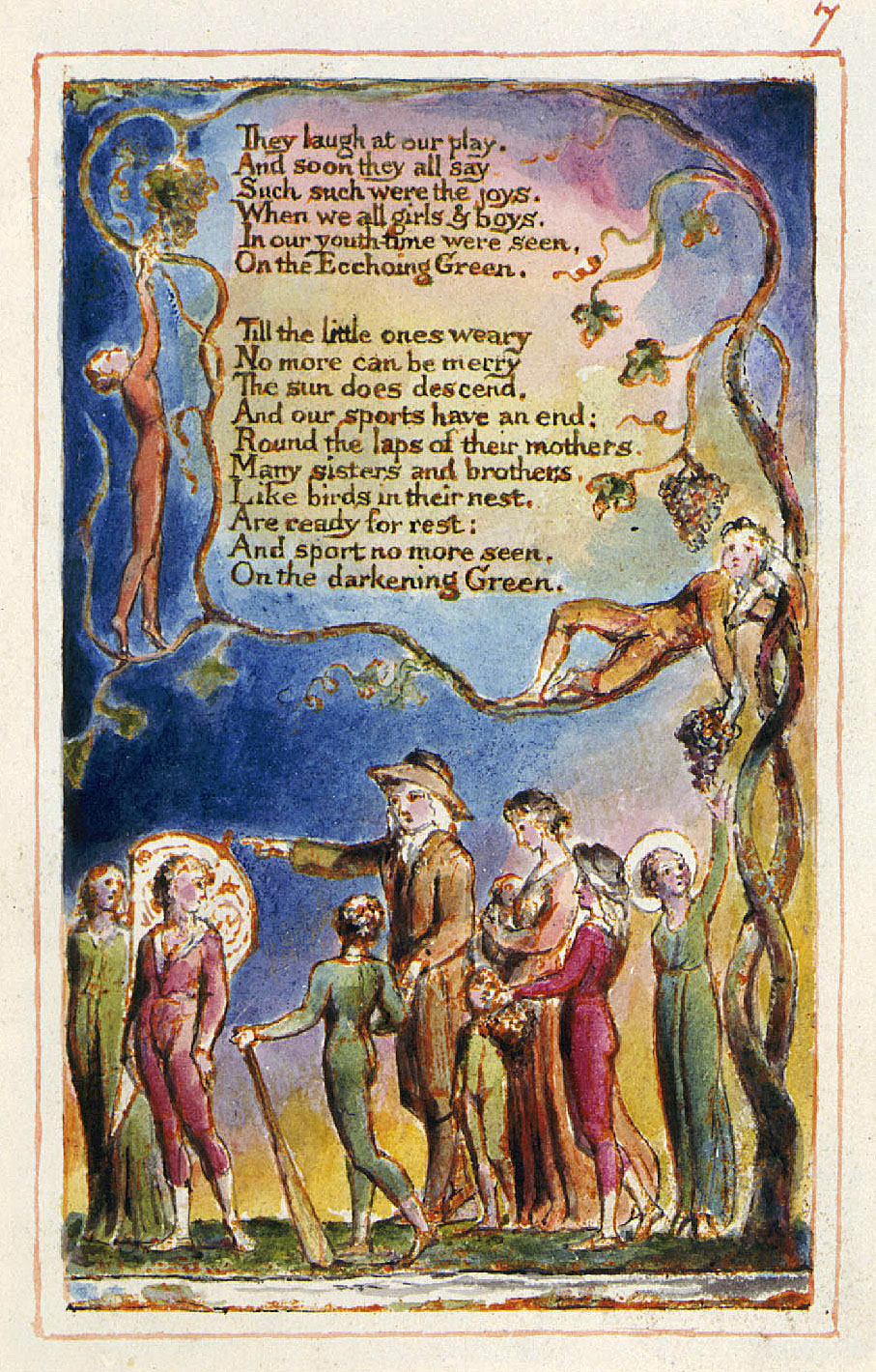
Copy Z, 1826 (Library of Congress) object 7 (The Echoing Green 2)

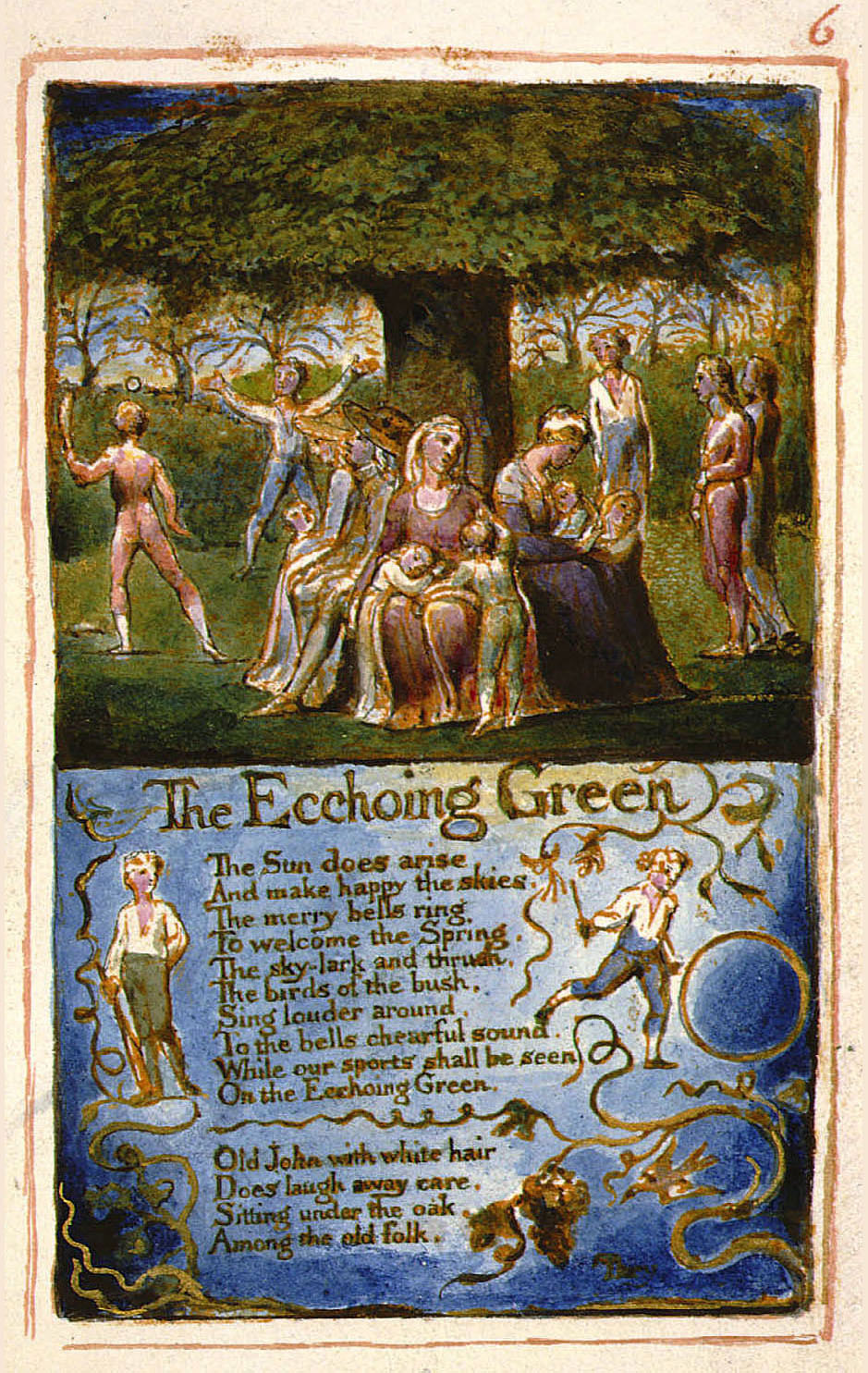
Copy AA, 1826 (The Fitzwilliam Museum) object 6 (The Echoing Green 1)

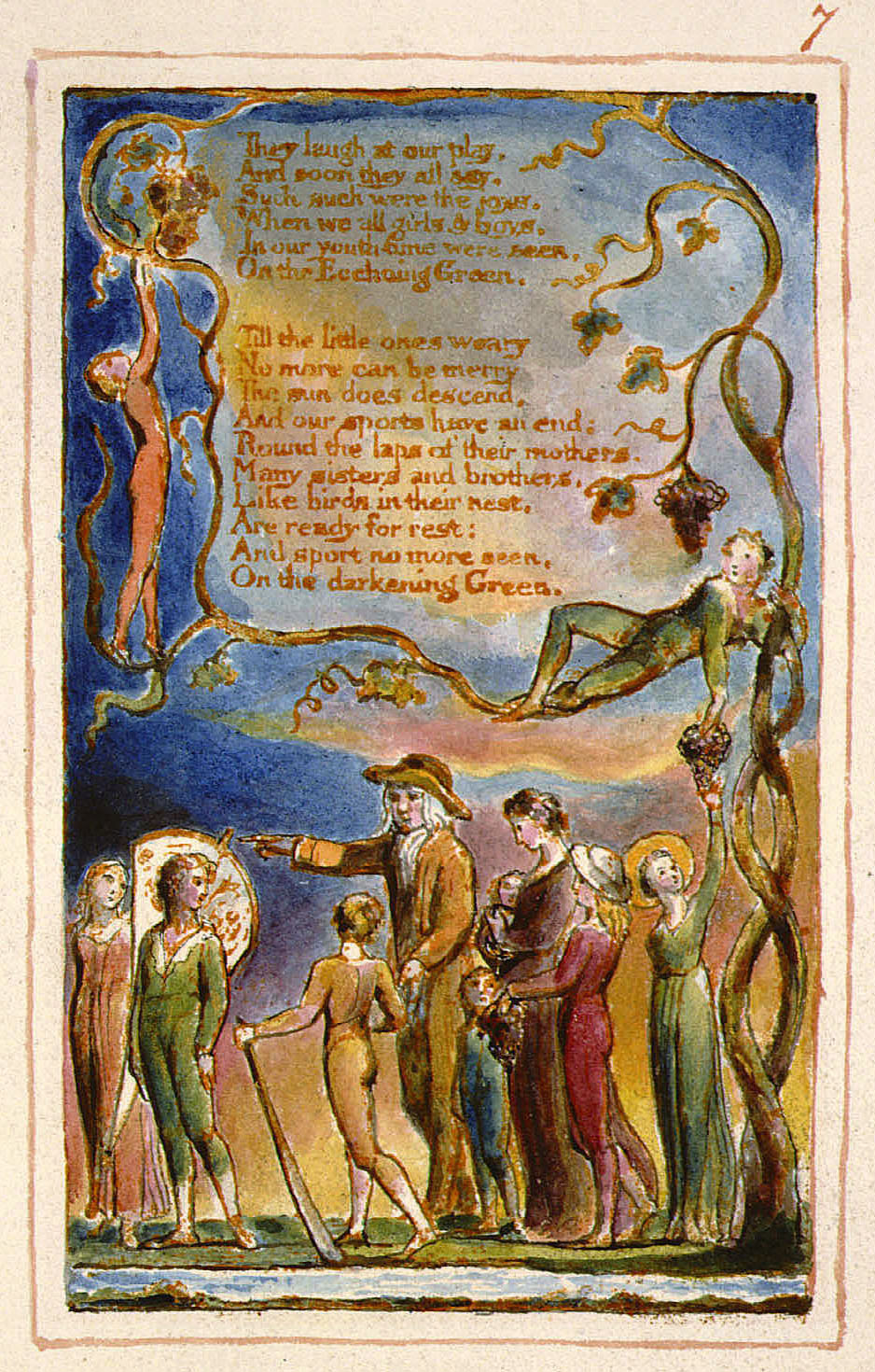
Copy AA, 1826 (The Fitzwilliam Museum) object 7 (The Echoing Green 2)

== In Popular Culture ==
George Orwell named his short memoir Such,_Such_Were_the_Joys, about his experiences in preparatory school, after the line in the poem.
