= Richard Blair (patron) =

Son of George Orwell (born 1944)

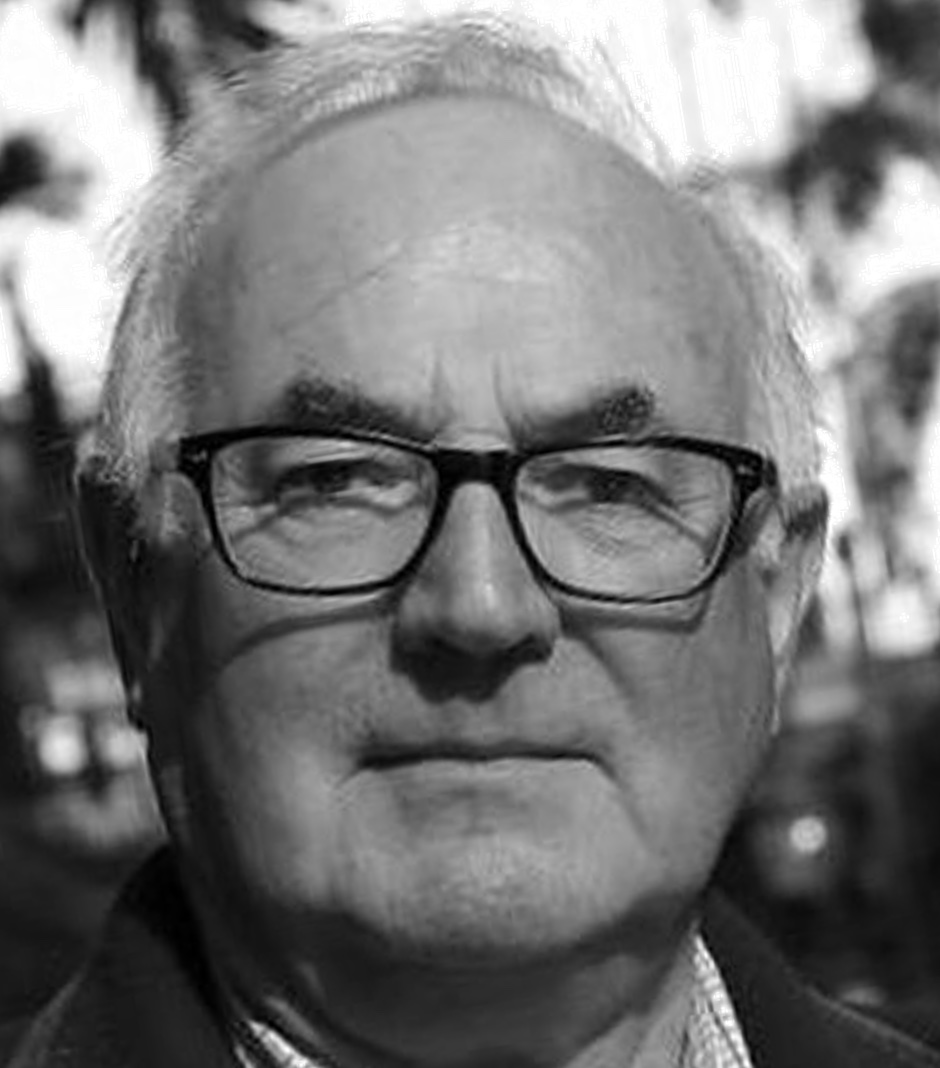
- Blair in 2021
- Born: 14 May 1944 (age 82)
- Occupations: Trustee; patron
- Spouse: Eleanor Blair (m. 1964)
- Children: 2
- Parents: George Orwell (adoptive father); Eileen O'Shaughnessy (adoptive mother)
- Relatives: Sonia Orwell (adoptive stepmother)

Richard Horatio Blair (born 14 May 1944) is a British trustee and patron who is the adopted son of English author George Orwell.

== Early life ==
Blair was adopted by Eileen and Eric Blair (George Orwell), and was their only child. After their deaths, he lived with Avril Dunn (née Blair, Orwell's sister, his legal guardian) and Bill Dunn. Blair learned that he had been adopted when he was around ten years old: "I didn't know I was adopted until I was about nine or ten. Avril was driving me somewhere and just dropped it in the conversation".

Blair went to Loretto School from 1953 to 1960, and attended the agricultural colleges of Wiltshire College and Scotland's Rural College, before joining Massey Ferguson, where he worked in sales and marketing from 1975 to 1986.

== Career and accolades ==
Having sold his business in 2008, Blair dedicated his time to preserving the memory of his father, George Orwell, which he continues today. At the beginning of 2009, Blair published his first account of his life with his father, and spoke publicly for the first time about his childhood, in an interview with D. J. Taylor at the Sunday Times CNA Literary Awards. In the following year, he collaborated with Dione Venables to inspire the founding of The Orwell Society, of which he is both patron and trustee. Two years later, Blair was elected trustee of The Orwell Foundation and Orwell Youth Prize, of which he is a patron.

After 2012, Blair increased his public activity by performing ceremonial roles such as unveiling plaques, presenting literary prizes, opening international events, making guest appearances on radio and television, and dedicating a statue to his father installed outside Broadcasting House. Blair is also engaged in more hands-on roles by hosting lectures through both The Orwell Society and The Orwell Foundation, publishing articles, sponsoring the Orwell Prize, and conducting annual guided excursions to his childhood house at Barnhill, Jura, where his father wrote Nineteen Eighty-Four.

In 2017, The Orwell Society initiated a series of engagements with the local community in Wigan to increase awareness of Orwell's motives in writing The Road to Wigan Pier, eighty years after the book was first published. Blair participated as one of the narrators in Beyond Wigan Pier, an opera first performed in 2018 aimed at attracting funding for students to attend Music & Drama school, and bringing the community closer to his father.

Blair is committed to stopping fake Orwell quotes from spreading on social media.

In 2023, Blair was awarded an honorary fellowship of University College London in recognition of his extensive support for the George Orwell Archive, which resides in the university's Special Collections department. The majority of the Orwell archive has been digitised and made available for everyone to access online.

== Personal life ==
He married Eleanor in 1964 and they have two sons, Gavin and Alastair. Blair's stepmother Sonia died in 1980, passing the income from the Orwell estate on to him.
