= The Orwell Foundation =

The Orwell Foundation is a charity registered in England and Wales, the aim of which is "to perpetuate the achievements of the British writer George Orwell (1903–1950)". The Foundation runs the Orwell Prize, the UK's most prestigious prize for political writing. In addition to the Prizes, the Orwell Foundation also runs free public events, debates and lectures and provides free online resources by and about Orwell. Since 2014, they have also run "Unreported Britain". The Orwell Youth Prize, a separate charity, work with young people aged 12–18 around the UK. The Orwell Youth Prize organises writing workshops for young people and runs a writing prize, culminating in an annual Celebration Day. The foundation is based at University College London, and is a registered charity no. 1161563.

== Orwell Prize ==
The Orwell Prize, established in 1994, is an annual award recognising and rewarding the books and journalism that come closest to realizing Orwell's ambition to "make political writing into an art". Between 2009 and 2012, a third prize was awarded for blogging, and in 2015, The Orwell Prize for Exposing Britain's Social Evils was launched. For more information, including past shortlists and winners, see the separate Orwell Prize page.

== Unreported Britain ==
The Foundations "Unreported Britain" initiative was started with the aim of finding stories that are otherwise ignored from communities whose voices are unheard, and giving them platform, profile and leverage.

== Lectures and debates ==
The Orwell Foundation organises free public lectures and debates. There are currently two annual Orwell Lectures: the Orwell Lecture at University College London and, from 2017, the Orwell Lecture in the North at the University of Sheffield.

=== Previous Orwell Lectures ===
- 1989: "Big Brother, Big Sister and Today's Media" – Bruce Kent
- 1990: "Must Revolutions Fail?" – Sir Ralf Dahrendorf
- 1991: "Fiction and Agnosticism" – Penelope Lively
- 1992: "Socialist Values" – Robin Cook
- 1993: "Changing the Legal Culture" – Helena Kennedy
- 1994: "But is it Socialism?" – Roy Hattersley
- 1995: "Risk" – Anthony Giddens
- 1996: "The Ministry of Agriculture: The Ministry of Truth" – Richard Lacey
- 1997: "Inside the Whale: the Relationship between the State and the Individual" – Frank Field
- 1998: "Orwell's 'little list'" – Peter Davison
- 1999: "The English Problem: National Identity and Citizenship" – Sir Bernard Crick
- 2000: "Nation, State and Globalisation" – Martin Wolf
- 2001: "House of Memory and London's Orbital Motorway" – Iain Sinclair
- 2002: Patrick Wright
- 2003: "From Authority to Celebrity – Intellectuals in Modern Britain" – Stefan Collini
- 2004: "Just Law: The changing fact of justice and why it matters" – Helena Kennedy
- 2005: "Projections of the inner 'I': George Orwell's Fiction" – D.J. Taylor
- 2006: "Homo Brittanicus, Soctophobia and All That" – Neal Ascherson
- 2007: "The Politics of Response – Orwell's contribution to the questions of how we read and what reading is for" – Michael Rosen
- 2008: "The English" – Andrew O'Hagan
- 2009: "'More like a castle than a realm': Thomas Cromwell's Radical England" – Hilary Mantel
- 2010: "Orwell and the Oligarchs" – Ferdinand Mount
- 2011: "Hacking away at the truth: an investigation and its consequences" – Alan Rusbridger
- 2012: "Secrets of the Cuban Missile Crisis" – Christopher Andrew
- 2013: "Democratising the Middle East: A New Role for the West" – Tariq Ramadan
- 2014: "'Whatever Happened to Social Mobility'" – David Kynaston
- 2015: "War, Words and Reason: Orwell and Thomas Merton on the Crises of Language" – Dr Rowan Williams
- 2016: "The Right to Dissent (and the Left too)" – Ian Hislop
- 2017: "Orwell with women" – A. L. Kennedy
  - 2017: "Nationalism should not be confused with patriotism – Our Divided Politics" – Ruth Davidson (The Orwell Prize Shortlist Lecture)
- 2018: "Unbecoming British: Citizenship, Migration and the Transformation of Rights into Privileges" – Kamila Shamsie
- 2019: "How To Predict An Election" - Daniel Finkelstein
- 2020: "Decolonising the Wonder House: Orwell, Empire and the Museum" - Dr Tristram Hunt
- 2021: "Politics and the Imagination: Reflection's on Orwell's Inside the Whale" - Ian McEwan
- 2022: "Wigan, the World and Everywhere In Between: How We Build a Country That Works" - Lisa Nandy MP
- 2025: Victoria Amelina - Looking at Women, Looking at War ; Donal Ryan - Heart Be at Peace (Doubleday) Jenny Kleeman - Journalism

=== Previous Orwell Lecture in the North ===
- 2017: "I've read all the academic texts on empathy" – Grayson Perry

== Orwell's legacy ==
The foundation also organises events and anniversary celebrations about George Orwell.

As the only website authorised by the Orwell Estate, the foundation also publishes online resources by and about Orwell.

== Orwell Youth Prize ==
The Orwell Youth Prize works with young people aged 12–18

== Orwell Daily ==
Orwell Daily is a new way to read one of the world's greatest writers. It is curated by The Orwell Foundation and comes with an official stamp of approval from the Orwell Estate. It is published on the Substack platform.
