= Peter Davison (literary scholar) =

British professor of English (1926–2022)

Peter Davison OBE
- Born: 10 September 1926; Newcastle upon Tyne, England
- Died: 16 August 2022 (aged 95); Swindon, England
- Occupations: Academic; biographer
- Spouse: Sheila Bethel (m. 1949; died 2017)
- Children: 3
- Writing career
- Subjects: George Orwell

Peter Hobley Davison OBE (10 September 1926 – 16 August 2022) was a British professor of English and an authority on the life and works of George Orwell.

== Background ==
Born in Newcastle upon Tyne on 10 September 1926, he worked in the Crown Film Unit and served in the Navy during the Second World War. He gained his bachelor's degree through correspondence and also had a master's degree in bibliography and palaeography.

== Career ==
After some time as a Fellow at the Shakespeare Institute, a lecturer at the University of Sydney, and as lecturer and senior lecturer at Birmingham University, he was appointed Professor of English at Saint David's University College (later University of Wales Trinity Saint David) and then at the University of Kent and De Montfort University, Leicester. He was later an emeritus professor of English at Glyndŵr University.

In 1992, he was president of the Bibliographical Society and edited its journal, The Library, for 12 years. He received the Society's Gold Medal in 2003. From 1991 to 2005 he was Secretary of the Economic and Social Research Council in London. Between 1986 and 1998 he was also Honorary Steward of Westminster Abbey.

In 1998, assisted by his wife, Sheila Davison, and Ian Angus he edited the 20-volume The Complete Works of George Orwell (Secker & Warburg, 1998).

In 2012 Davison announced the launch of The Orwell Society and was made an honorary founding member the following year. In 2013, he edited Orwell's Diaries and Orwell: A Life in Letters.

== Personal life ==
Davison married Sheila Bethel in 1949. They had three children and remained together until her death in 2017. He died at a hospital in Swindon on 16 August 2022, at the age of 95.

== Collections ==
In 2004 Davison donated his archive to University College London. The collection includes material relating to his books, correspondence with publishers, and photocopies of Orwell's work which have been annotated by Davison.

== Publications ==
- George Orwell: A Literary Life (Palgrave Macmillan, 1996)
- The Complete Works of George Orwell (Secker & Warburg, 1998) ISBN 0 436 20377 4
- The Lost Orwell (Timewell Press, 2007) ISBN 978-1857252149
- George Orwell: A Life in Letters (Penguin, 2011)
