= Eric & Us =

1974 memoir by Jacintha Buddicom

- First edition
- Author: Jacintha Buddicom
- Language: English
- Genre: Memoir
- Publisher: Leslie Frewin
- Publication date: 1974

Eric & Us is a 1974 memoir by Jacintha Buddicom recalling her childhood friendship with Eric Blair, the real name of author George Orwell. Buddicom first met Blair when he was eleven and he became very close to her family. Their friendship lasted until Blair became a policeman in Burma and the two lost touch. Blair and Buddicom never saw one another again and did not resume contact until 1949, shortly before Orwell's death from tuberculosis.

Buddicom's memoir, as well as recalling her relationship with Orwell, shows her disappointment in some of the views he took — for instance, she condemned his decision to fight in the Spanish Civil War as interfering in the affairs of another country. She also portrayed him as reserved but happy, in contrast to the bleak picture Orwell presents of his childhood in "Such, Such Were the Joys".

Buddicom's cousin, Dione Venables, added a postscript to the memoir in 2006, suggesting that the real reason for the ending of Blair and Buddicom's friendship was the possibility that Blair had attempted to take their relationship further than Buddicom was ready for in what was characterised as a botched seduction.

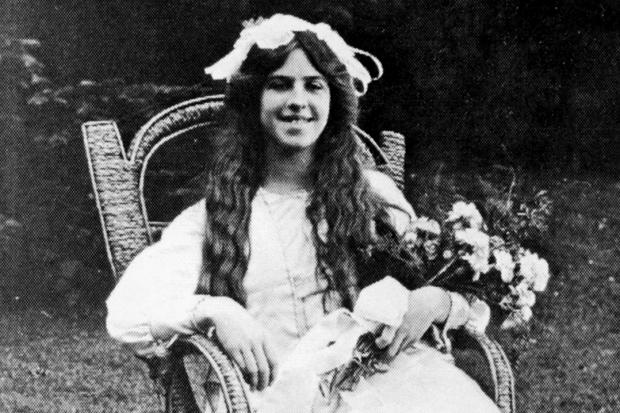
Jacintha Buddicom, author of Eric & Us
