= Jacintha Buddicom =

English writer (1901–1993)

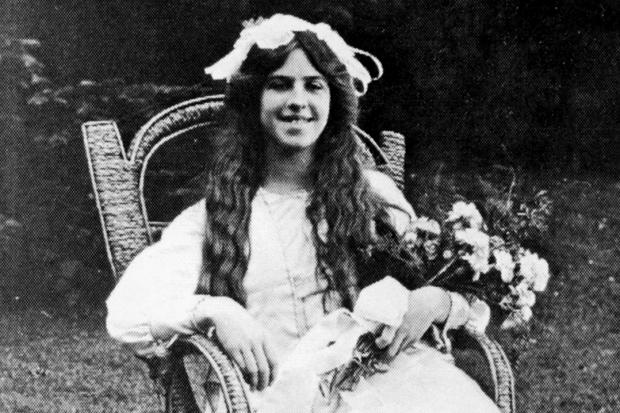
- Buddicom in 1918
- Born: Jacintha Laura May Buddicom; 10 May 1901; Plymouth, Devon, England
- Died: 4 November 1993 (aged 92); Bognor Regis, West Sussex, England
- Occupations: Poet, writer
- Children: 1
- Parents: Robert Arthur Buddicom; Laura née Finlay

Jacintha Laura May Buddicom (10 May 1901 – 4 November 1993) was an English poet and a childhood friend of George Orwell (Eric Blair). She met Blair in 1914 and they developed a shared interest in poetry, but she lost touch with him after he departed for Burma in 1922, and later she disputed Blair's writings about his own childhood. The two were in contact again near the end of Blair's life. She gave an account of the relationship in her memoir Eric & Us, published in 1974.

== Biography ==
=== Relationship with Eric Blair ===
Buddicom was born in Plymouth to Robert Arthur Buddicom, of Ticklerton Court, Church Stretton, Shropshire, Buddicom moved with the rest of her family to Shiplake, Oxfordshire where she first met Eric Blair in the summer of 1914 when he was standing on his head in a field at the bottom of the Buddicoms' garden. When asked why, he replied, "You are noticed more if you stand on your head than if you are the right way up."

From that summer afternoon, Eric and his younger sister Avril became very close friends with Buddicom and her younger brother and sister, Prosper (Robert Prosper Gedye Buddicom, 1904–1968) and Guinever (Guinever Laura Olivia Norsworthy Buddicom; 3 February 1907 - 4 February 2002). With Prosper and Guiny, Blair enjoyed shooting, fishing and birdwatching, while with Jacintha he preferred to read and write poetry and dream of future intellectual adventures. At this time he told Buddicom that at some point he might write a book in a style similar to that of H. G. Wells's A Modern Utopia, although Nineteen Eighty-Four turned out to be far different from Buddicom's expectations.

Buddicom was educated at Oxford High School, but neither she nor Blair achieved their shared dream of going to Oxford University. Their last time alone together was on holiday at Rickmansworth in the summer of 1921, when Blair had attempted to take their relationship further than Buddicom was ready for, in what was characterised as a "botched seduction". (Note: In reviewing her postscript, Kathryn Hughes interpreted Venables’ account as revealing an "attempted rape". Venables never used the phrase "attempted rape", which originated from Kathryn Hughes herself. Venables’ postscript reveals that she asked Buddicom’s sister if Blair had raped Buddicom, and she gave an emphatic “No”. Hughes must have noted that Blair had “attempted to take things further”, which she chose to characterise as "attempted rape". Both Hughes and Venables considered the incident to have been a "botched seduction".) When Blair left for Burma the following year, he wrote to Buddicom complaining about his life there but she was unsympathetic to his letters and stopped writing back.

In 1927, Buddicom gave birth to a daughter (Michal) as a result of an unsuccessful affair, and gave the baby away for a childless aunt to adopt. When Blair, who never knew of Buddicom's daughter, came back from Burma on leave that year, he stayed at the Buddicom family home with the aim of proposing to Buddicom, but she was mysteriously absent. Blair assumed that Buddicom was still angry with him and they did not make contact again. She then began a 30-year affair with a peer of the Realm.

It was not until 1949, a few months before Orwell's death, that Buddicom realised that George Orwell, the author of Animal Farm, was her childhood friend Eric Blair. Buddicom and Blair exchanged a few letters and phone conversations, briefly reviving adolescent memories. Blair was eager for Buddicom to come and see him, "to talk about my little son Richard", but it was too late by then, and a few months later, after her mother's death, Buddicom slipped unnoticed into Orwell's funeral service at Christ Church, Albany Street, in 1950.

Buddicom was at great pains to dispute the picture of childhood misery described by Orwell in his essay "Such, Such Were the Joys". She claimed that "he was a specially happy child", writing "There was no harping on inferiority and poverty by Eric then.... The picture painted of a wretched little neurotic, snivelling miserably before a swarm of swanking bullies, suspecting that he smelt, just was not Eric at all." And she made a systematic investigation of many of his claims and allegations in order to disprove them. She described him as an aloof and undemonstrative boy, and recalled him as being self-sufficient with no need of a wide circle of friends.

After her death, her cousin Dione Venables, who was left the copyrights for the book and a quantity of family papers, did much in-depth research, and in 2006 published a revised edition of Eric & Us, which revealed the Rickmansworth incident in 1921.

=== Poetry and other activities ===
Buddicom lived with her sister for many years. She designed two Shropshire houses, and two motor-caravans for which she won prizes. She wrote a book of poetry published in America, and her Cat Poems were published in 1973, a year before Eric & Us appeared.

== Publications ==
- The Compleat Workes of Cini Willoughby Dering. New York: Payson & Clarke, 1929.
- "The Young Eric", in Miriam Gross (ed.) The World of George Orwell. London: Weidenfeld & Nicolson, 1971.
- Cat Poems. London: Leslie Frewin, 1973.
- Eric & Us: a remembrance of George Orwell. London: Leslie Frewin, 1974.
