= Such, Such Were the Joys =

Autobiographical essay by George Orwell

"Such, Such Were the Joys" is a long autobiographical essay by the English writer George Orwell.

In the piece, Orwell describes his experiences between the ages of eight and thirteen, in the years before and during World War I (from September 1911 to December 1916), while a pupil at a preparatory school: St Cyprian's, in the seaside town of Eastbourne, in Sussex. The essay offers various reflections on the contradictions of the Edwardian middle and upper class world-view, on the psychology of children, and on the experience of oppression and class conflict.

It was probably drafted in 1939–40, revised in 1945–46, and not completed until May or June 1948. It was first published by Partisan Review in 1952, two years after Orwell's death.

The veracity of the stories it contains about life at St. Cyprian's has been challenged by a number of commenters, including Orwell's contemporaries at the school and biographers, but its powerful writing and haunting observations have made it one of Orwell's most commonly anthologised essays.

== Summary and analysis ==
The title of the essay is taken from "The Echoing Green", one of William Blake's Songs of Innocence which Orwell's mother had read to him when they lived at Henley:

Old John, with white hair,
Does laugh away care,
Sitting under the oak,
Among the old folk.
They laugh at our play,
And soon they all say,
"Such, such were the joys
When we all – girls and boys —
In our youth-time were seen
On the echoing Green."

The allusion is never explained in Orwell's text, but it is grimly ironic, since Orwell recollects his early boarding school experiences with almost unrelieved bitterness. St Cyprian's was, according to him, a "world of force and fraud and secrecy," in which the young Orwell, a shy, sickly and unattractive boy surrounded by pupils from families much richer than his own, was "like a goldfish thrown into a tank full of pike." The piece fiercely attacks the cruelty and snobbery of both his fellow pupils and of most of the adults connected with the school, – particularly the headmaster, Mr. Vaughan Wilkes, nicknamed "Sambo," and his wife Cicely, nicknamed "Flip".

Orwell describes the education he received as "a preparation for a sort of confidence trick," geared entirely towards maximising his future performance in the admissions exams to leading English public schools, such as Eton and Harrow, without any concern for actual knowledge or understanding. Orwell also claims that he was accepted as a boarder at St Cyprian's —at half of the usual fees—in the hopes that he would earn scholarship that would contribute to the school's prestige, and therefore to its commercial success. Moreover, he writes that his training relied heavily on corporal punishment, while the rich boys received preferential treatment and were never beaten.

The essay lashes out at the hypocrisy of the Edwardian society in which Orwell grew up and in which a boy was "bidden to be at once a Christian and a social success, which is impossible." A chapter is devoted to the puritanical attitudes towards sex at the time and to the frightful consequences of the discovery of what appears to have been a case of mutual masturbation among a group of boys at the school. On the other hand, Orwell describes the actual "pattern of school life" as

a continuous triumph of the strong over the weak. Virtue consisted in winning: it consisted in being bigger, stronger, handsomer, richer, more popular, more elegant, more unscrupulous than other people—in dominating them, bullying them, making them suffer pain, making them look foolish, getting the better of them in every way. Life was hierarchical and whatever happened was right. There were the strong, who deserved to win and always did win, and there were the weak, who deserved to lose and always did lose, everlastingly.

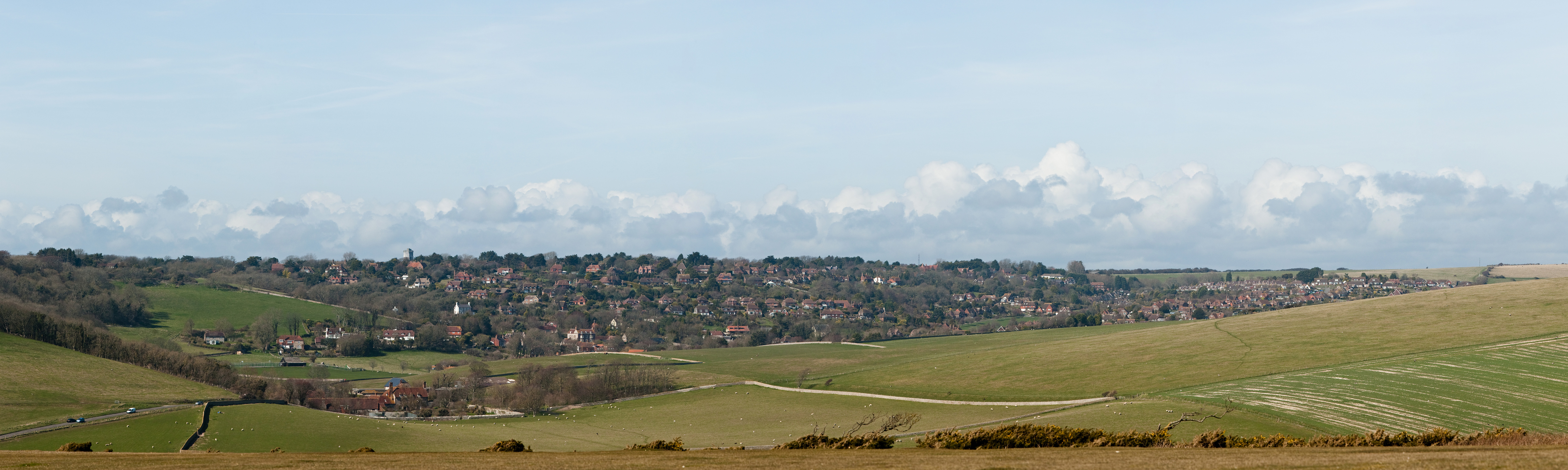
Amongst the few good memories that Orwell carried away from St Cyprian's were the summer expeditions across the South Downs to local villages.

Orwell's story is also punctuated by anecdotes about the dirt and squalor surrounding him at St Cyprian's. He describes the porridge at the dining hall as containing "more lumps, hairs and unexplained black things than one would have thought possible, unless someone were putting them there on purpose," recalls seeing a human turd floating in the Devonshire Baths, and mentions how a new boy's teeth turned green because of neglect.

According to the essay, the main lesson that Orwell took away from St Cyprian's was that, for a "weak" and "inferior" person such as himself, "to survive, or at least to preserve any kind of independence, was essentially criminal, since it meant breaking rules which you yourself recognized," and that he lived in a world "where it was not possible [for him] to be good." In the piece, Orwell also reflects that children live "in a sort of alien under-water world which we can only penetrate by memory or divination," and he wonders whether even in more modern times, without "God, Latin, the cane, class distinctions and sexual taboos," it might still be normal for schoolchildren to "live for years amid irrational terrors and lunatic misunderstandings."

== Background ==
Secondary education for the dominant classes in England since the early 19th century has been provided mainly by the fee-paying public schools. These have selective entrance by examination and offer scholarships by competitive examination, which offset all or part of the fees. The curriculum in Orwell's time, and for long after, centred on the classics. Prep schools were established from the 19th century to prepare students for these examinations and to provide a broader-based education than the traditional crammer, offering sports and additional subjects. Prep school children were often boarders, starting as early as five or as late as twelve. Boarding was, and still is, for terms of three months. Eastbourne was a popular town for preparatory schools at the turn of the 20th century because its bracing sea air was believed to be healthy, and by 1896, Gowland's Eastbourne Directory listed 76 private schools for boys and girls. An Eton scholarship was most highly prized, not just for its financial value but because it provided access to the elite intellectual cadre of King's Scholars. One of the leading prep schools of the time, Summer Fields School, set in the university town of Oxford and with which St Cyprian's eventually was to merge, won every year at least five of the available Eton scholarships.

Orwell's mother sent him (as Eric Blair) to board at St Cyprian's School at the age of eight in 1911. The school had been founded twelve years earlier by the headmaster, Vaughan Wilkes, and his wife Cicely. It had moved into newly built facilities in extended grounds in 1906. Although able to charge high fees for better-off parents, the Wilkeses supported traditional families on lower incomes, particularly in the colonial service, by taking their children at considerably reduced fees. Orwell was one of several beneficiaries, who also included Cyril Connolly, Alaric Jacob, and Walter Christie. Mrs Wilkes spotted Orwell looking sad on his arrival and tried to comfort him, but noted "there was no warmth in him". Nor did he respond positively to being taken on a picnic the following day. Senior boys in Orwell's first year included Ian Fraser and Bolo Whistler. His early letters home report a normal catalogue of class placings, results of games, and school expeditions.

In September 1914 Cyril Connolly arrived at the school and formed a close friendship with Orwell. World War I had just broken out, and Orwell's patriotic poem written at school was published in the Henley and South Oxfordshire Standard. The war made life difficult for the school – most of the teaching staff left to fight, although one staff member Charles Edgar Loseby, later a Labour MP, returned for a period while recovering from being gassed in the trenches. The First World War had a significant effect in other ways – there was the increasing roll call of old boys killed in the trenches, Mr Wilkes spent his summer holidays driving ambulances in France, the boys knitted and put on entertainments for the injured troops camped nearby, and food shortages made feeding a challenge. Classics was taught by Mr Wilkes, while the formidable Mrs Wilkes taught English, history and scripture. The long-serving deputy, Robert Sillar, taught geography, drawing, shooting and nature studies and was highly regarded in old boys' accounts. Outings on the South Downs were a regular part of school life, and Sillar led the boys on nature study expeditions. The school had instituted a Cadet Corps, in which Orwell was an active member. Orwell recalls stealing books from Connolly, and Connolly describes how they reviewed each other's poetry. Cecil Beaton vaguely recalled working on the school's war-time allotments with Orwell. During his time at school, Orwell surreptitiously collected saucy seaside postcards that were later to figure in his essay The Art of Donald McGill.

In 1916, Orwell came second in the Harrow History Prize, had another poem published in the Henley and South Oxfordshire Standard, and with Connolly had his work praised by the external examiner Sir Charles Grant Robertson. In 1916, Orwell won a scholarship to Wellington College, a school with a military background appropriate for colonial service. Mr Wilkes also believed Orwell could win an Eton scholarship and would benefit from Eton College life, and so he sat the Eton exam as well. Orwell headed the school prize list in 1916 with classics, while Cyril Connolly won the English prize, Cecil Beaton won the drawing prize, Walter Christie won the history prize, and Rupert Lonsdale won the scripture prize. Henry Longhurst, Lord Pollington, and Lord Malden were among the winners of other class prizes. Other activities in which Orwell was involved were narrowly missing winning the diving competition, playing the part of Mr Jingle in the school play, and being commended as a useful member of the 1st XI cricket team. Although he had won an Eton scholarship, it was subject to a place becoming available. Instead of going to Wellington, he stayed at St Cyprian's for an additional term in the hope that a place at Eton would materialise. Because that had not happened by the end of term, he went on to Wellington in January. However, after he had been there for nine weeks, an Eton place became available, which Orwell took.

== Publication ==
On sending a version of the essay to Warburg, in May 1947, Orwell stated that he had written the "long autobiographical sketch" partly as a "sort of pendant" to the publication in 1938 of Enemies of Promise, an autobiographical work by Cyril Connolly, and at Connolly's request. Connolly, who had been Orwell's companion at St Cyprian's and later at Eton, had written an account of St Cyprian's, which, though cynical, was fairly appreciative compared with Orwell's. In his letter to Warburg, Orwell wrote that he thought his essay was "really too libellous to print", adding that it should be printed "when the people most concerned are dead". The libel report for Secker & Warburg, compiled after Orwell's death, judged that well over thirty paragraphs were defamatory. David Farrer, partner of Orwell's publishers, considered it a "gross distortion of what took place".

Both Sonia Orwell and Warburg wanted to publish Such, Such Were the Joys immediately after Orwell's death, but Orwell's literary executor Sir Richard Rees violently disagreed. He considered the work "grossly exaggerated, badly written, and likely to harm Orwell's reputation" and when Sonia insisted, he told her, "You’re completely nutty about St Cyprian's". Thereafter, Rees had no further involvement in publishing decisions. In 1952, within two years of Orwell's death, a version was published in the United States in the Partisan Review. In this version the school was referred to as "Crossgates" and the names of the headmaster and his wife altered to Mr and Mrs Simpson ("Sim" and his wife "Bingo"). Following Mrs Wilkes' death in 1967, "Such, Such Were the Joys" was published in the UK, but with only the name of the school and the proprietors in original form – the real names of his fellow pupils were still disguised. In the Completed Works edition (2000), the original text including all names has been restored.

== Reaction from contemporaries ==
Of his contemporaries, Cecil Beaton wrote of the piece "It is hilariously funny, but it is exaggerated". Connolly, on reviewing Stansky & Abraham's interpretation, wrote "I was at first enchanted as by anything which recalls one's youth but when I went to verify some references from my old reports and letters I was nearly sick... In the case of St Cyprian's and the Wilkes whom I had so blithely mocked I feel an emotional disturbance... The Wilkeses were true friends and I had caricatured their mannerisms (developed as a kind of ritual square-bashing for dealing with generations of boys) and read mercenary motives into much that was just enthusiasm." Walter Christie and Henry Longhurst went further and wrote their own sympathetic accounts of the school in response to Orwell's and voiced their appreciation for the formidable Mrs Wilkes. Robert Pearce, researching the papers of another former pupil, made a comprehensive study from the perspective of the school, investigating school records and other pupils' accounts. While some features were universal features of prep school life, he concluded that Orwell's depiction bore little relation to reality and that Orwell's defamatory allegations were unsupportable. Davison writes "If one is looking for a factual account for life at St Cyprian's, this is not the place to seek it."

On Orwell's claimed state of misery, Jacintha Buddicom, who knew him well at the time, also raised a strong challenge. She wrote "I can guarantee that the 'I' of "Such, Such were the Joys" is quite unrecognisable as Eric as we knew him then", and "He was a philosophical boy, with varied interests and a sense of humour—which he was inclined to indulge when referring to St Cyprian's in the holidays."
