= Managerialism =

Political theory based on professional managers

Managerialism is the idea that organizations should be managed by people who are professional managers, and usually with the aim of achieving particular results that can be measured.

It is an organizational philosophy and practice that emphasizes the application of management techniques and business-oriented approaches across various types of organizations, including private companies, public sector institutions and non-profit entities. The concept centers on the belief that organizations can be optimized through systematic management processes focused on control, accountability, measurement, and strategic planning. Managerialists often justify it on the grounds of improving organizational efficiency, and management has become an academic discipline in its own right. Management scholars view management as a skill or unique style to be developed if one is to successfully manage an organization.

However, critics of the idea argue that managerialism is in fact a worldview similar to neoliberalism where each human is assumed to be an economically motivated homo economicus.

New Public Management is one example of managerialism, where public services were reformed to be more 'businesslike', using quasi-market structures to manage areas such as public healthcare. A common critic is that public facilities being managed by profit motives is antagonistic to human welfare.

== History ==
Managerialism emerged from the Industrial Revolution in the United Kingdom when the putting-out system was replaced by the factory system, creating large workforces that required administration.

Notwithstanding any respectable origins and popularity in practice, managerialism has encountered criticism.

The introduction of managerialism in the public sector is associated with the New Public Management (NPM) movement of the 1980s.

== Perspectives on managerialism ==
In usage the term management is generally used neutrally, to refer to management practices within an organization. Managerialism (with the -ism suffix) is usually used disapprovingly in contexts where the worldviews behind management structures are critiqued from a left-wing, welfarist, anti-corporate, or libertarian perspective.

There are many perspectives on managerialism. Following Enteman's 1993 book on Managerialism: The Emergence of a New Ideology, Robert R. Locke and J. C. Spender see managerialism as an expression of a special group – management – that entrenches itself ruthlessly and systemically in an organization. In their view, it deprives owners of decision-making power and workers of their ability to resist managerialism. Locke and Spender state the rise of managerialism may in itself be a response to people's resistance in society and more specifically to workers' opposition against managerial regimes.

Enteman (1993), Locke and Spender (2011) and Klikauer (2013) explain Managerialism in three different ways:

Enteman (1993)	Locke and Spender (2011)	Klikauer (2013)
Ideology	The Business School	Managerialism and Society
Capitalism	Management Science	Ideology and Social Change
Socialism and Marxism	Managerialism and Morality	Culture and Authoritarianism
Democracy	The US Automobile Industry	Management Studies
Democratic Capitalism	The Financial Crisis	Managerialist Thinking
Ethics, Economics and Business	Balancing Managerialism	Post-Managerial Living

Building on Enteman (1993) and Locke/Spender (2011), Thomas Klikauer in “Managerialism – Critique of an Ideology” (2013) defined managerialism thus:

"[....] Managerialism combines management knowledge and ideology to establish itself systemically in organisations and society while depriving owners, employees (organisational-economical) and civil society (social-political) of all decision-making powers. Managerialism justifies the application of managerial techniques to all areas of society on the grounds of superior ideology, expert training, and the exclusive possession of managerial knowledge necessary to efficiently run corporations and societies."

As the simpler yet already highly organised management of Henri Fayol (1841-1925) and Frederick Winslow Taylor (1856-1915) mutated into managerialism, managerialism became a full-fledged ideology under the following formula:

Management + Ideology + Expansion = Managerialism

Two examples of the extension of management into the non-management domain – the not for profit sphere of human existence – are public schools and universities. In both cases, managerialism occurs when public institutions are run “as if” these were for-profit organization even though they remain government institutions funded through state taxes. In these cases, the term new public management has been used. But the ideology of managerialism can even extend into more distant institutions such as, for example, a college of physicians.

Albert A. Anderson summarized managerialism as the ideological principle that sees societies as equivalent to the sum of the decisions and transactions made by the managements of organizations.

Compare what the historian James Hoopes wrote (2003):

"[...] the main genesis of managerialism lay in the human relations movement that took root at the Harvard Business School in the 1920s and 1930s under the guiding hand of Professor Elton Mayo. Mayo, an immigrant from Australia, saw democracy as divisive and lacking in community spirit. He looked to corporate managers to restore the social harmony that he believed the uprooting experiences of immigration and industrialization had destroyed and that democracy was incapable of repairing."

== Managerialist ideology ==
The managerialist society responds to the managements of various organizations in relation to their transactions with each other. The needs, desires and wishes of the individual are heard through their membership of an organization. Furthermore, managerialism is both a process and a substantive ideology. Managerialism says that the fundamental social units are not individuals, as capitalism would declare, but rather that the fundamental social units are organizations. Ultimately, managerialism specifically denies that the fundamental nature of society is an aggregation of individuals.

Instead, managerialism sees the core building-block of contemporary society as the modern business company or corporation. To further business, companies, and corporations is the ideological goal of managerialism. How managerialism functions as such an ideology has been expressed by one of managerialism's main ideological flagships – the Harvard Business Review – when former editor Joan Magretta made the following revelation:

Business executives are society's leading champions of free markets and competition, words that, for them, evoke a world view and value system that rewards good ideas and hard work, and that fosters innovation and meritocracy. Truth be told, the competition every manager longs for is a lot closer to Microsoft's end of the spectrum than it is to the dairy farmers'. All the talk about the virtues of competition notwithstanding, the aim of business strategy is to move an enterprise away from perfect competition and in the direction of monopoly

— Magretta,2012

=== Political ===
Managerialism in political science is a set of beliefs, attitudes and values which support the view that management is the most essential and desirable element of good administration and government. It follows that in all enterprises and services, both private and public, expertise in management must be taught by training and by incentives to excel. In the political world this may take the form of asserting that much conflict and argument are unnecessary for solving problems. All that is needed is a rational assessment of the problem and this involves gathering and collating information, listing the options, calculating costs of each, evaluating consequences and choosing the best course of action. Recent managerialism has included such devices as "performance indicators" (purporting to measure the relative efficiencies of different managers) and "market testing" (which compares public sector managers' responsibilities and tasks with those of managers in the private sector in order to assess their pay). Managerialism is criticized for weakening the public-service ethos.

=== Economic ===
Economically, managerialism is the application of managerial techniques in businesses. Managerialism in this regard has to do with the strategic approach of goal-setting. In order to achieve previously unimagined levels of accumulation and production, businesses within a capitalist economy needed a way of connecting their strategic plan of actions to desired implementations of those plans. Within an organization, the individuals at the top of the organizational hierarchy determine a mission or set of goals, which is then strategically analyzed by individuals lower on the hierarchy (managers) to devise local goals to carry out the overall mission. Put simply, the managerial standard is to receive goals from above and to create new goals for those below.

There is a belief that in managerialism, organizations have more similarities than differences, and thus the performance of all organizations can be optimized by the application of generic management skills and theory. To a practitioner of managerialism, there is little difference in the skills required to run a college, an advertising agency or an oil rig. Experience and skills pertinent to an organization's core business are considered secondary.

The term "managerialism" can be used disparagingly to describe organizations perceived to have a preponderance or excess of managerial techniques, solutions, rules and personnel, especially if these seem to run counter to the common sense of observers. It is said that the MBA degree is intended to provide generic skills to a new class of managers not wedded to a particular industry or professional sector.

There have been mixed reviews on the efficacy of managerialism, explored extensively in university studies of the State. Some have accepted the flaws in the theory, building upon it and putting it forth as a valid theory of the State. Others have outright rejected such a proposition, responding that – regardless of the few similarities – such a system could not be successful on a political level.

The word "managerialism" can also be used pejoratively, as in the definition of a management caste. Robert R. Locke defines it accordingly as:

"What occurs when a special group, called management, ensconces itself systemically in an organization and deprives owners and employees of their decision-making power (including the distribution of emolument), and justifies that takeover on the grounds of the managing group's education and exclusive possession of the codified bodies of knowledge and know-how necessary to the efficient running of the organization."

== New Managerialism ==
For details on New Managerialism, see New public management.

New Managerialism – or New Public Management – is an ideology used for legitimizing the development of new organizational forms and relationships. It has been coined a practical ideology of being 'business-like’ in order to make the new arrangements work for all forms of jobs, organizations, and education systems. The ‘business-like’ indicates what is called “as if” ideologies. Managerialism is conceptualized in that it seeks firstly to explain the socioeconomic and political reasons behind why particular organizations have been developed and, secondly, to describe the ways in which public services are currently being delivered. The idea of Managerialism came to fruition when new organizational forms originated from a view that professional bureaucratic modes of organization were inefficient and could not cope with the challenges rising from increasing globalization. Managerialism, however, has not remained static over the years as it has had many different versions of its implementation. Its linkage to the changing practices associated with an agenda moves away from a purely Neo-liberal framework. While neo-liberalism uses politics (e.g. elections) and economics to achieve its goals, Managerialism is fundamentally anti-democratic following instead management’s command-and-control concept. While using business-like mechanisms to ensure great cost effectiveness is still used as a great technique. There have been movements away from purely market based systems that were in place strictly for efficiency, to contractual mechanisms and performance measurement through audit and review. In practice of Managerialism, consumers are redefined as well. Not only do consumers have choice in regard to where and how they receive their services, but they should be actively involved in determining what services should be provided as well. In new Managerialism consumers are redefined as well. Not only should they have choice regarding where and how they receive their services, but they should be actively involved in determining what services should be provided as well. The Managerialism explains public services not as production functions or firms, but as governance structures. What is at stake is not so much the ethos and practice of management as the culture and structure of governance. Here governance means the organisational culture and structure of the relationship between what Weber called legitimate domination and the self-constitution of those who are subject to it. What Weber meant by legitimate domination was justified by an authority structure, which was, in turn, legitimated by rational authority. Hence, one finds a renewed interest of Managerialism in fostering managerial leadership. But governance through Managerialism was never only dependent for its legitimization on Weber’s notion of legal-rational authority, but more on forms of rationality that depend upon, for example, strategic management, cost-benefit-analysis, efficiency in the market, etc. Although this Managerialism draws on models of corporate Managerialism as well as accounts of New Public Management, it is also imbued with the practices of self in everyday life. What is new here, is recognition of the technologies of self that individuals employ to implicate themselves in their own governance. This creates what became known as “The Entrepreneurial Self”. The way Managerialism achieves this, for example, at university levels is through a re-formulation of research and science.

=== Influences ===
George Elton Mayo: "One friend, one person who is truly understanding, who takes the trouble to listen to us as we consider our problems, can change our whole outlook on the work" Mayo was an Australian psychologist and organizational theorist. A former professor of Industrial Management at the Harvard Business School, Mayo heavily researched the behavior of workers at Western Electric; a manufacturing facet of AT&T. Today he is considered a major contributor to the intellectual thought process and ideas of business management, as well as critical theories of industrial and organizational psychology. His book, The Human Problems of an Industrialized Civilization articulates his collective thoughts taken from the famous Hawthorne research study conducted while at Harvard University.

Karl Marx: "Society does not consist of individuals but expresses the sum of interrelations, the relations within which these individuals stand." Marx has set many standards in the fields of philosophy, economics, and sociology as one of the worlds most prominent and controversial thinkers. Commonly known for his ideas outlined in The Communist Manifesto and Das Kapital Marx has exemplified ideas of management and order with his very apparent socialistic views. Sociologically Marx has identified core interrelations between groups of people classified by class structures, and how those claimed relations may lead to the success or failures of a collective society.

Friedrich Nietzsche: "To do great things is difficult; but to command great things is more difficult" A 19th century German philosopher, Nietzsche heavily contributed to the fields of management and leadership. Focusing in on ideas of morality; particularly distinguishing the differences between what he labeled the, "master morality," and "slave morality," Nietzsche has exemplified the development of managerial practices through the subjections of moral emphasis and control. "He was especially interested, therefore, in a probing analysis and evaluation of the fundamental cultural values of Western philosophy, religion, and morality, which he characterized as expressions of the ascetic ideal.

== See also ==
- Corporatocracy
- Corporatism
- James Burnham, author of The Managerial Revolution (1941)
  - Managerial class
- George Orwell, author of Second Thoughts on James Burnham (1946)
- The Servile State
- Performance measurement
- Scientific management
- Technocracy
