= The Servile State =

1912 book by Hilaire Belloc

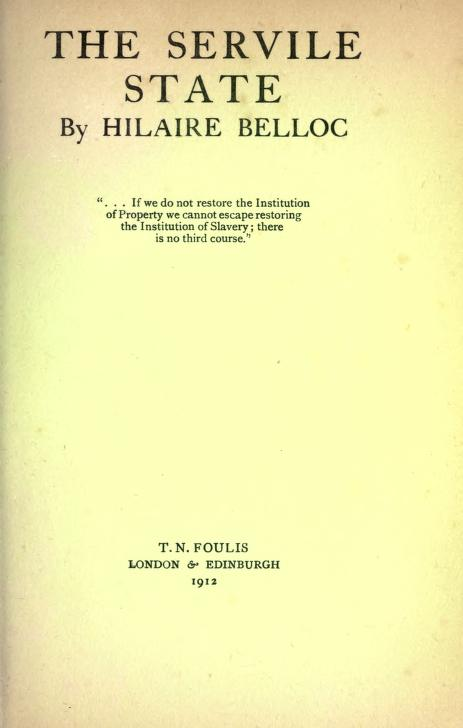
- A copy of the original issuing of The Servile State, first published in 1912
- Author: Hilaire Belloc
- Language: English
- Subject: political economy, capitalism, distributism, socialism, history of economics, history of Europe
- Publisher: T. N. Foulis
- Publication date: 1912
- Pages: 133
- ISBN: 9780692282489
- Text: The Servile State at Internet Archive

The Servile State is a 1912 economic and political treatise by Hilaire Belloc. It serves primarily as a history of capitalism, a critique of both capitalism and socialism, and a rebuke of developments Belloc believed would bring about a form of totalitarianism he called the "servile state". The "servile state" is a state in which the proletariat – defined as a majority of civil society dispossessed of the means of production – is compelled by positive law to work for those possessed of those same means. Belloc believed that capitalism is fundamentally unstable and therefore serves as a transitory state of affairs, viewing it as a disruption of the natural development of property and societal norms that arose during the Middle Ages. While Belloc writes about socialism – which he generally refers to as "collectivism" – as an alternative to capitalism, he believes that attempts at its implementation are ineffective and will only hasten and solidify the reintroduction of the servile state.

== Background ==
=== Author ===
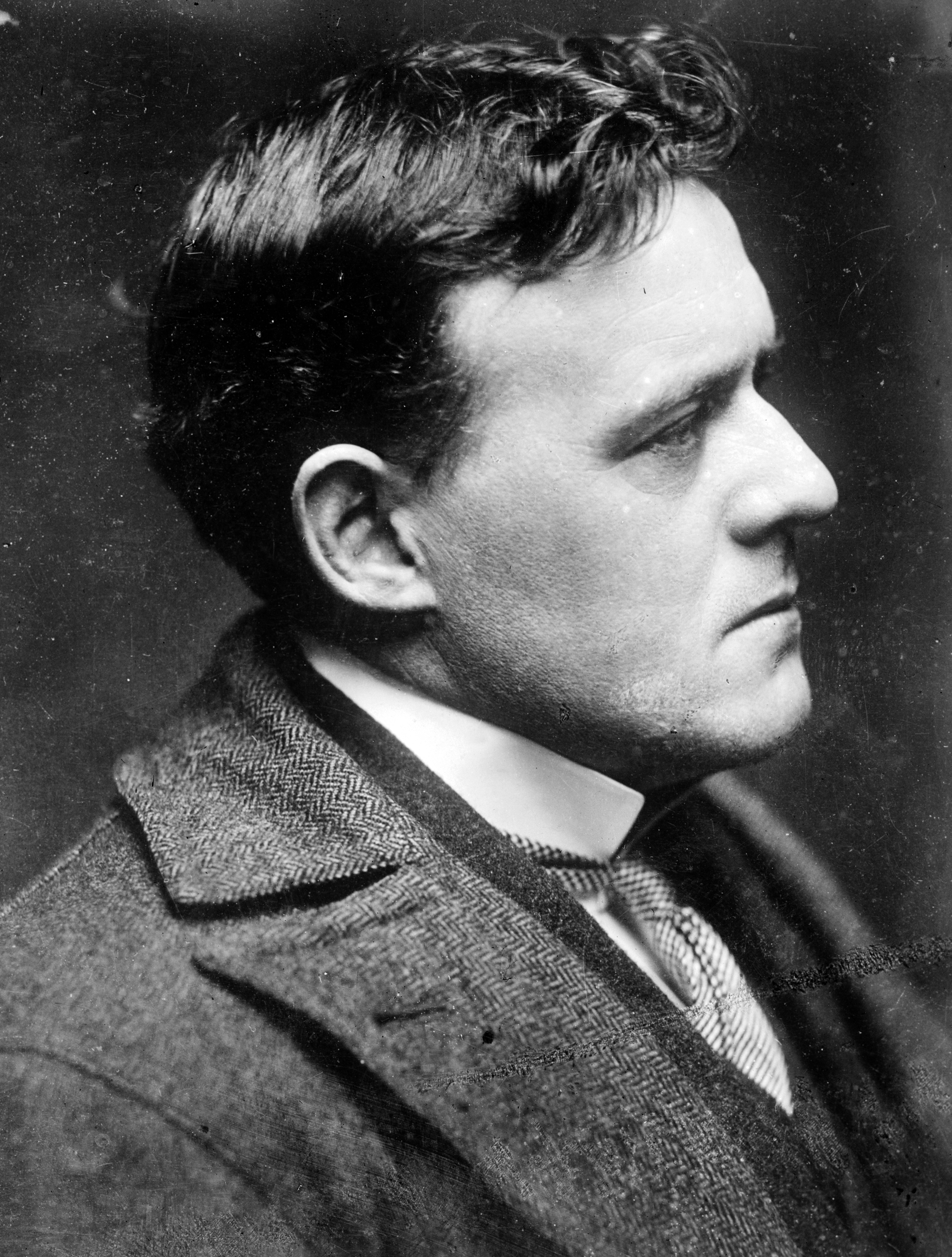
Belloc in 1910

Hilaire Belloc was a French-English writer and historian who served as a member of Parliament for the now-defunct Liberal Party from 1906 to 1910 and was one of the few Catholics among them. The book was written after his time in Parliament, but prior to the socialist revolutions that occurred shortly thereafter, most notably the Russian Revolution in 1917. As an MP, Belloc is considered to have been a continuation of the new liberals and British Radicals of the late 19th century, identified with John Bright, Richard Cobden, and William Cobbett. During his time in office, he developed an intense distaste for parliamentary politics, viewing it as unconcerned with the well-being of the proletariat and becoming frustrated by unreasonable compromise and the inability of his colleagues to challenge what he saw as systemic abuse of the working class.

=== Catholic social teaching ===
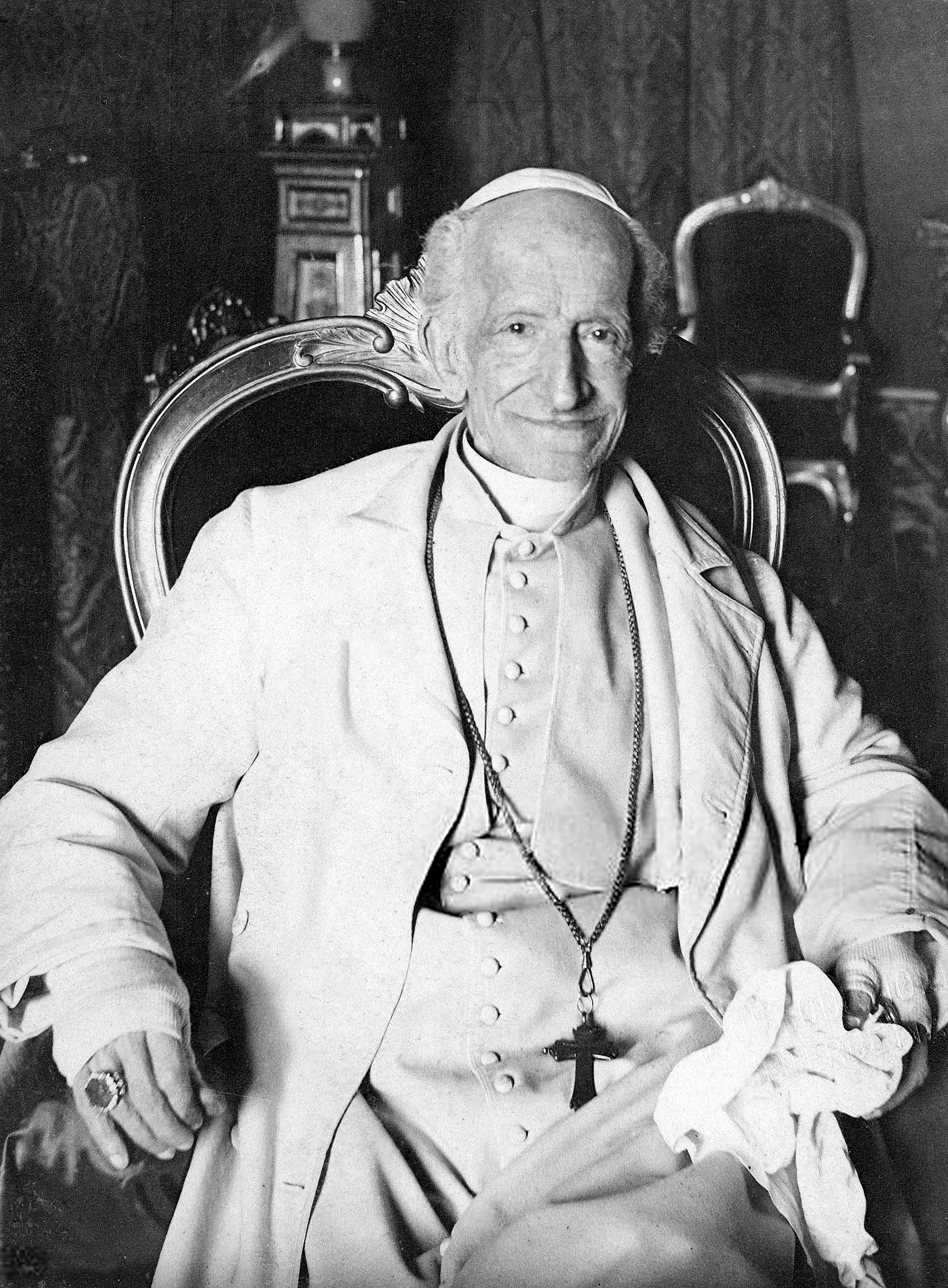
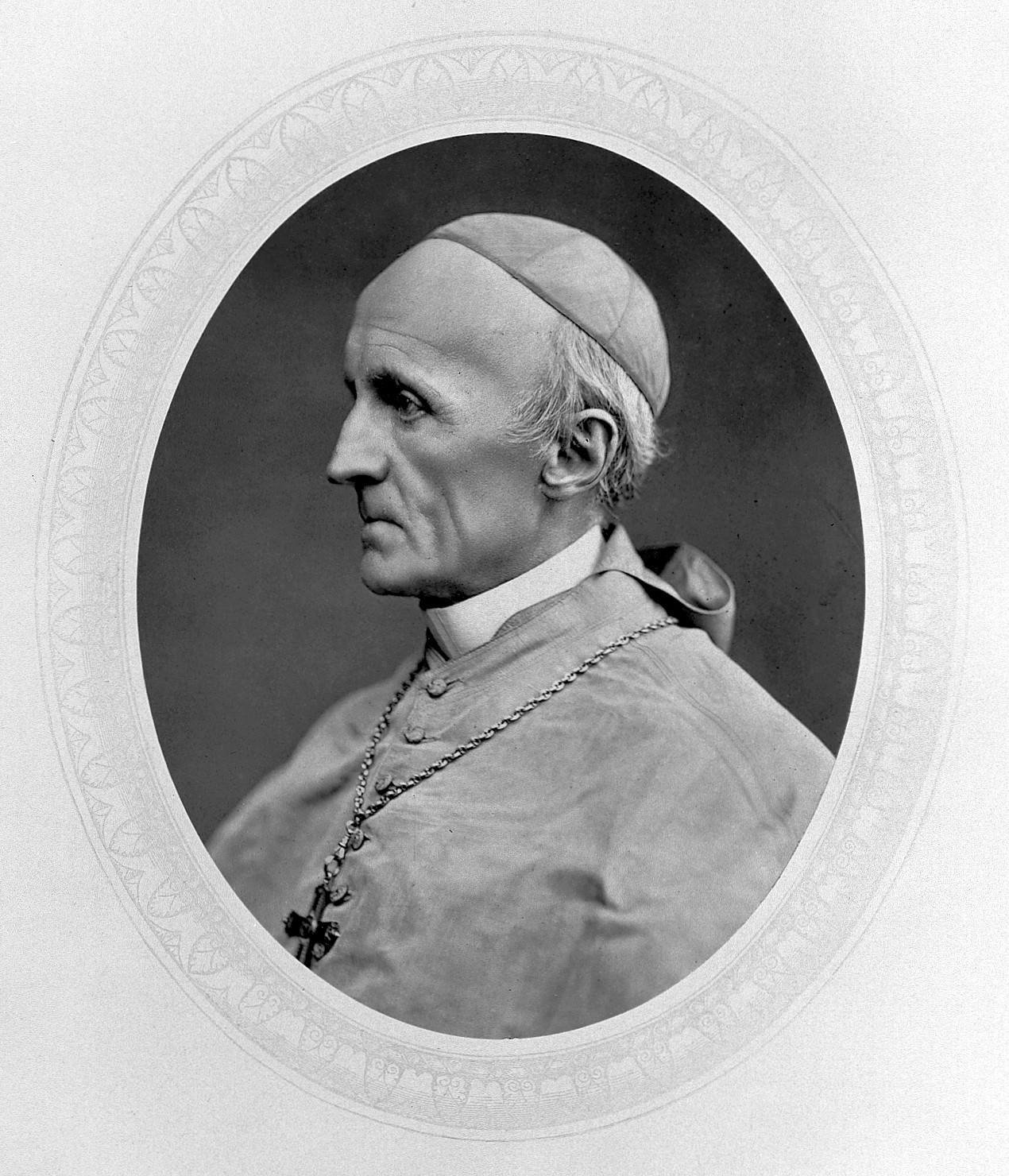
Leo XIII (left) and Henry Edward Manning were both foundational figures in the Catholic social teaching.

In the latter half of the 19th century, Catholic thought expanded its focus in the fields of economics and sociology, in large part due to the social upheaval brought about by the advent of mass production, the rise of a definitive capitalist framework, and the rise of labor rights movements. The Catholic social teaching became a central theme for Catholic activists of the era in the wake of Leo XIII's 1891 encyclical Rerum novarum, which was particularly influential on Belloc. This encyclical explicitly addressed the condition of the working class and condemned "the misery and wretchedness pressing so unjustly on the majority of the working class". Cardinal Henry Edward Manning, who also was a massive influence on Belloc, was a significant contributor to the development of the encyclical and encouraged English Catholics to engage in politics and seek economic justice, even going so far as to support the 1889 London dock strike. A journalist for The Pall Mall Magazine referred to Rerum novarum as "a magnificent confirmation from the Papal Chair of Cardinal Manning's doctrines". The encyclical defended the right of workers to form unions and the institution of property.

=== Distributism ===
Belloc is considered – together with his lifelong friend and collaborator, G. K. Chesterton – founding theorists for the economic theory of distributism. The Servile State is the first such reference of the term and remains universally cited in discourse on distributism. Belloc later expanded the scope of distributism from a critical analysis of capitalism – what is principally described in The Servile State – to a more robust, descriptive economic theory. Later contributions Belloc made to distributism include Economics for Helen (1924) and An Essay on the Restoration of Property (1936).

== Content ==
=== Origins of servility and distribution ===
Beginning with the pagan states of pre-Christian Europe, Belloc discusses the indispensability and universality of slavery among them and makes particular note that slaving states maintained members of their own tribe as slaves. The institution of slavery required perpetual recruitment and – although boosted by the capture of prisoners of war, slave raids, and slave markets – poverty was the main driver of slavery in the pre-Christian economic and social order. Because slaves, who were dispossessed of property, worked under the command of another, possessing property and able to compel labor by positive law, a two-class system of servility developed. Slavery was natural to pagan society, where even slave revolts were attempts to escape the institution, but never to abolish it.

Belloc credits the Christianization of Europe with the dissolution of the servile state under the pagan states of Antiquity, though not directly. Slavery itself was not condemned by any particular contemporary Catholic dogma nor did the Church directly attack the institution of slavery. While early Christian evangelists did consider the emancipation of a slave laudable, Belloc is quick to note that pagans also considered it praiseworthy and early Christian contempt for the sale of Christians into slavery was not held in such a contempt because slavery itself was contemptible, but because it "was a sort of treason to civilisation to force men away from Civilisation to Barbarism". Despite this, Belloc says that slavery as an institution largely disappears anyway and credits this shift to the development of the villa, land usually owned by a single proprietor on which several others worked.

The villa was the peri- and post-feudal institution that gave way to the manorial order. This development created the conditions by which pagan slavery was transmuted into the earliest distributive states. Belloc writes of the transition:

The Slave was still a Slave, but it was both more convenient in the decay of communications and public power, and more consonant with the social spirit of the time to make sure of that Slave's produce by asking him for now more than certain customary dues. The Slave and his descendants became more or less rooted to one spot. Some were still bought and sold, but in decreasing numbers. As the generations passed a larger and larger proportion lived where and as their fathers had lived, and the produce which they raised was fixed more and more at a certain amount, which the lord was content to receive and ask no more.

=== Reformation and Industrial Revolution ===
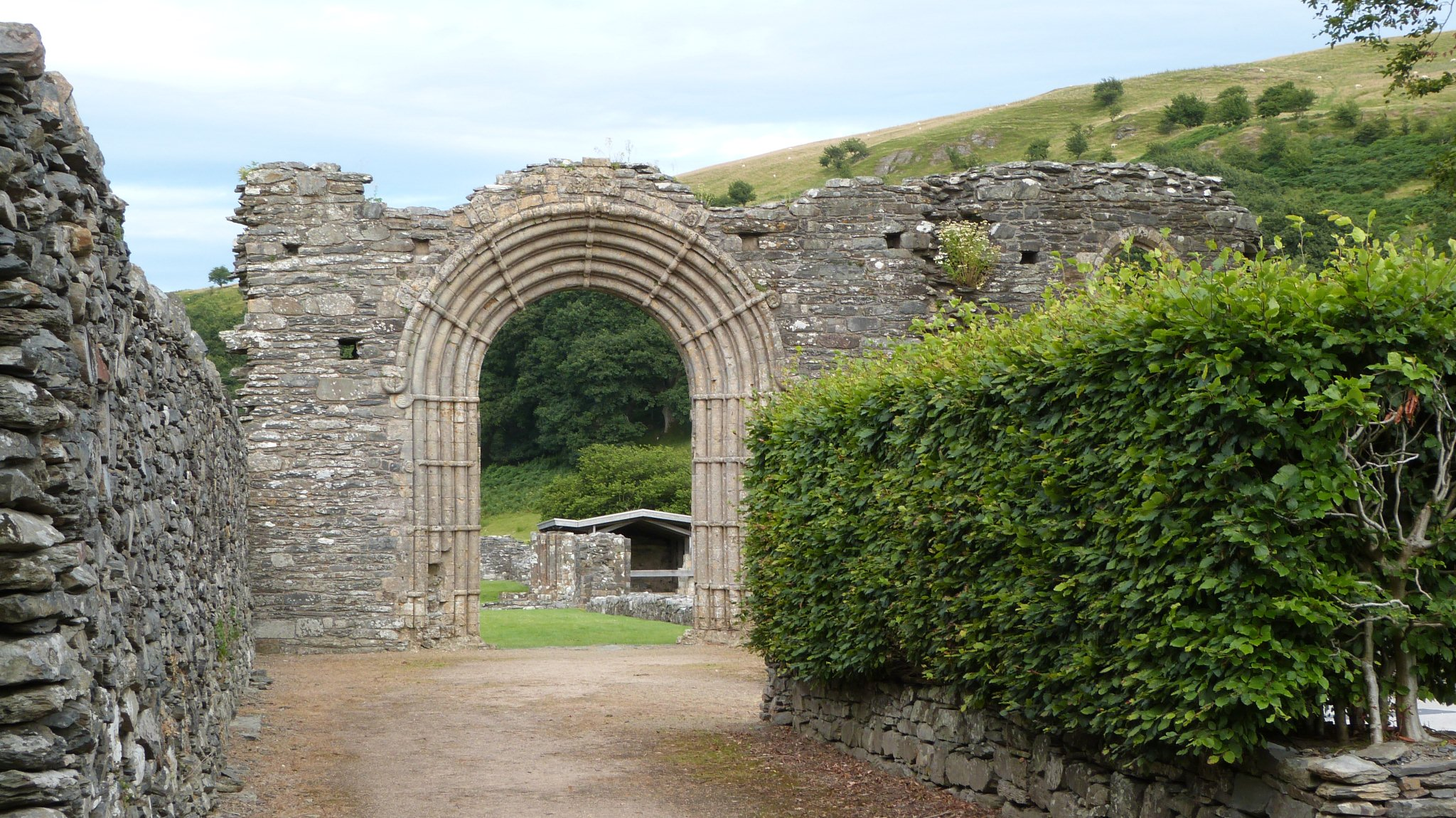
The Strata Florida Abbey was a Cistercian monastery dissolved by Henry VIII. It initially averted dissolution with heavy fines until it was finally closed in 1539.

Belloc did not agree with his contemporaries that the Industrial Revolution caused the rise of capitalism in Europe, but rather saw it as a tool that only capitalists had been able to effectively utilize because the distributive state had already been dispossessed of its economic power. Principally responsible for the rise of capitalism, which Belloc says ultimately disrupted the development of the distributive state, was the Protestant Reformation.

The English Reformation and the subsequent dissolution of the monasteries by Henry VIII led to the redistribution of church-owned property, amounting to – by Belloc's estimate – between 25 and 30 percent of the economic power of England, into the hands of the Crown. Critically, the King was unable to maintain control of these lands. Landowners whose large holdings were still relics of the feudal order remained powerful in English politics, owning – again, by Belloc's estimation – "anything from a quarter to a third of the agricultural values of England", were able to gain control of these newly seized lands. The Crown, unable to reestablish ownership of the land, created the conditions that led to the collapse of the manorial order. Belloc writes:

Observe the effect of this. All over England men who already held in virtually absolute property from one-quarter to one-third of the soil and the ploughs and the barns of a village, became possessed in a very few years of a further great section of the means of production, which turned the scale wholly in their favour. They added to that third a new and extra fifth. They became at a blow the owners of half the land! In many centres of capital importance they had come to own more than half the land. They were in many districts not only the unquestioned superiors, but the economic masters of the rest of the community. They could buy to the greatest advantage. They were strictly competitive, getting every shilling of due and of rent where the old clerical landlords had been customary leaving much to the tenant.

Economic power was now held by a few powerful landlords instead of a plurality of such who had been distributed throughout the country under the distributive state. Under manorialism, according to Belloc, ownership had not been completely extractive; tenants paid a certain "customary" due and rent to the lord, but anything produced over that allotted payment had been the rightful property of the tenant. The new ownership class ignored the customary dues and rents, instead opting for a completely extractive approach by laying claim to all of a tenant's surplus value. By 1700, Belloc estimates that at least half the land in England belonged to the new owner class, and this class had therefore become a capitalist class in the truest sense of the word – that is, a minority of citizens who own the means of production and extract the greatest surplus value from its proletariat – prior to the advent of the Industrial Revolution.

Belloc believed that the Industrial Revolution expedited the dispossession of ownership from the many into the hands of the new capitalist class, but was not the principal cause of capitalism. He wrote that, under the correct conditions, the discoveries and inventions of the Industrial Revolution "would have blest [sic] and enriched mankind", but, because they could only run into the possession of those who owned the means of production, only exacerbated the disparity that already existed between the possessed and the dispossessed.

=== Instability of capitalism ===
Belloc viewed capitalism as inherently unstable. He states that the combination of a dispossessed majority who live under "a conscious, direct, and planned exploitation" will cause two major strains. The first is that there is a strain between the moral framework that the state uses to legitimize itself to the majority and the social facts which refute it. The second is that the exploitation of the masses creates an atmosphere of anxiety and insecurity, even among the capitalist class, but especially among the masses. Belloc writes that each alone would be enough to destroy the social fabric, but "the two combined make destruction certain".

==== Moral framework of the state ====
Belloc describes the moral tension of the state as a perversion of laws and traditions understood and accepted by the public. To him, the law presupposes that the state is composed primarily of free citizens, both acquainted with and having respect for the concept of property, who are more or less equal in property and power. Theft and fraud are crimes because they are understood to be immoral transgressions against a socially and morally agreed upon view of property. A social contract like this permits all persons to own property and to have that property defended by threat of law, thus freeing all persons from the anxiety of having that property stolen or unjustly revoked. Under capitalism, the inviolability of property is still accepted by the public, but corrupted by the capitalist class to defend itself from theft while exploiting the dispossessed. Belloc writes:

Property remains as an instinct perhaps with most of the citizens; as an experience and a reality it is unknown to nineteen out of twenty. One hundred forms of fraud, the necessary corollary of unrestrained competition between a few and of unrestrained avarice as the motive controlling production, are not or cannot be punished: petty forms of violence in theft and of cunning in fraud the laws can deal with, but they cannot deal with these alone. Our legal machinery has become little more than an engine for protecting the few owners against the necessities, the demands, or the hatred of their mass dispossessed fellow-citizens.

In other words, because the ownership class has collected so much property and wealth from the many, the courts can no longer exercise the truest sanctions in society; the ownership class can willingly withhold livelihood from the working class. This, Belloc writes, is attested in the fact that a man fears the loss of employment more than he fears legal punishment. This conflict between a person's almost innate respect for property and his belief in law being an extension of moral justice creates a disjunctive view of right and wrong, causing "acute spiritual conflict".

==== Capitalism and security ====
Belloc argues that capitalism creates a pervasive atmosphere of anxiety and insecurity. He writes that the origin of this is based on the combination of the ownership of the means of production by very few and the political freedom of owners and non-owners. He explains that any person in a position to work aims to accumulate some kind of surplus in order to insulate himself from times of hardship, but the extraction of his surplus value makes this accumulation impossible. The lack of protection against hardship makes the conditions of political freedom impossible and, Belloc argues, not only creates an atmosphere of insecurity, but removes the mechanisms by which that insecurity can be rectified, leading to the deterioration of the state itself. Belloc notes that, at "its own logical extreme", capitalism has no direct incentive to maintain the survival of its dispossessed class, but that it cannot achieve that logical extreme without the destruction of the state. Because the state ultimately benefits it, the capitalist class must intervene, "by non-Capitalist methods", to keep its working class alive and well enough to work; Belloc cites Poor Relief Act 1601 and the Poor Law Amendment Act 1834 as such interventions.

Further, Belloc sees capitalism as unable to reach its extremes, hampered by extreme waste, a finite labor pool, and competition. To insulate itself from these issues, the owners of capital restrict freedom and undercut competition.

==== Solutions to instability ====
Belloc believed the instability caused by capitalism would eventually trend towards stability by becoming one of three social arrangements: slavery, socialism, or property. (Note: Belloc notes that there could possibly exist mixtures of any of the three social arrangements, but that each serves as "a dominant type" from which "no fourth arrangement can be devised". He does not expand on this.) He contends that two factors, which combined, are unworkable: the ownership of the means of production by a few and freedom for all. With regards to freedom, Belloc considers it a moral obligation to reject any "direct and conscious establishment of slavery as a solution to the problem of Capitalism". Thus, disruption of minute number of owners over the means of production remains the only way of creating a state which serves to benefit society. Belloc writes:

If you are suffering because property is restricted to a few, you can alter that factor in the problem either by putting property into the hands of many, or by putting it into the hands of none. There is no third course.

=== Vulnerability in reform ===
All forces, then, are making for the Servile State [...] The generous reformer is canalised towards it; the ungenerous one finds it a very mirror of his ideal; the herd of "practical" men meet at every stage in its inception the practical steps which they expected and demanded; while that proletarian mass upon whom the experiment is being tried have lost the tradition of property and of freedom which might resist the change, and are most powerfully inclined to its acceptance by the positive benefits which it confers.

— Hilaire Belloc, The Servile State, Making for the Servile State, p. 100

Belloc did not believe that the reformers of his day had appropriate answers to the problem of capitalism. Although he considered a large number of socialists to be honorably attempting to curtail the worst elements of capitalism, he felt that their approaches were both too conciliatory to capitalism and too easily "canalized" by capitalists seeking to preserve their status, leading to servility rather than the socialism that they aimed for. For Belloc, the problem of socialism is that it is myopic and appeals to the same goals as capitalism; its short-sightedness allows capital to make certain concessions, such as a minimum wage, which do indisputably help the impoverished, but in doing so gave capital the ability to institutionalize itself to the state. Other reformers, particularly those who saw themselves as practical non-socialists, simply failed to make any meaningful difference at all. The proletariat resigns to wage-earning instead of property-owning and gives servile institutions easier headway.

==== Defining socialism ====
Belloc begins his critique of socialism by defining it within the scope of capitalism's instability. Because restricting freedom is an unconscionable act, the property possessed by the few must either be distributed to the many, ensuring a large ownership class, or distributed to "none". For Belloc, as a practical matter, "'none' means to vest it as a trust in the hands of political officers", since the absence of any control over the means of production would mean starvation. He compares socialism in this way to distributism by claiming that socialism is the belief that private property itself is the issue and, thus, under it, private property is abolished and the means of production should be managed by political officers holding and managing it on behalf of the public, whereas distributism argues that it is only the small size of the ownership class which is the issue and, thus, under it, private property remains as a publicly recognized institution and the means of production are widely owned. Belloc states that the socialist state – which he usually refers to as the collectivist state or collectivism – is the easiest solution for the proletariat to aim at, but that, by aiming at it, "in the very act of attempting Collectivism, what results is not Collectivism at all, but the servitude of the many, and the confirmation in their present privilege of the few; that is, the Servile State."

==== Relationship to capitalism ====
Belloc further defines socialism as something of a collected pool of resources, where public officers within the community hold the means of production, such as land and other capital, in public trust and serve at the pleasure of the community as well as on its behalf. He contends that, based on his previous explanation of the development of the original servile state into the fledgling distributive state, the socialist proposition was only experimental and had a high degree of risk and impracticality because there was no historicity of its success; Belloc appeals to the success of the distributive state prior to the advent of the Reformation as proof that the distributive state existed, producing stability and happiness within society. However, he did not believe that socialism was without some sense of practicality; he considered it to impart less "shock" on society as it transitioned away from capitalism. Belloc believed that the most rational implementation of socialism was the buyout of private ownership – particularly public works – into public trust, putting the profits away in order to fuel more buyouts. Critiquing his own system, he notes that this is common practice, where public works transition from private ownership to public ownership, "without any perceptible friction", whereas artificial distribution of this kind of property to many shareholders, as a transition back to the distributive state would demand, would be met with extreme opposition and could regress back into a few owners. In this, Belloc describes socialism as "working with the grain":

In a word, the man who desires to re-establish property as an institution normal to most citizens in the State is working against the grain of our existing Capitalist society, while a man who desires to establish Socialism – that is Collectivism – is working with the grain of that society. The first is like a physician who should say to a man whose limbs were partially atrophied from disuse: "Do this and that, take such and such exercise, and you will recover the use of your limbs." The second is like a physician who should say: "You cannot go on as you are. Your limbs are atrophied from lack of use. Your attempt to conduct yourself as though they were not is useless and painful; you had better make up your mind to be wheeled about in a fashion consonant to your disease." The Physician is the Reformer, his Patient the Proletariat.

Belloc saw socialism as a rash response to the contemporary condition of the working class; the cruelty and injustice experienced by the working class at the hands of the few was rightly condemned, in his view, by the socialists, but their response to it was weak, impetuous, and uncertain to be successful. He criticizes socialism for working too well within the contemporary capitalist system and being too similar to capitalism itself, thinking in its terms and appealing to the appetites it aroused. He further criticizes "the stupider kind" of socialist who views capitalism as a particular phase, through which all societies must pass in order to reach the socialist phase, where monopoly is celebrated because it expedites the transition from capitalism to socialism. He says socialism promises laborers the security and organization that capitalism provides – such as pensions, regular promotions, and so on – but that, as administered by the political officers, the system would simply do as it does now, only under different management. According to Belloc, the capitalist class may view socialism as an enemy, but an enemy it can understand on its own terms and which conforms to its own conception of commodification.

Belloc contends that earlier socialists held the belief that the only thing holding socialism back was the ignorance of the masses; consequently, all that was necessary to bring about socialism was the education of the masses for "the great transformation to become possible". Socialists of his own era, he contends, however, are becoming "woefully disturbed" as it "becom[es] more and more evident that with every new reform", they are coming nearer to the servile state.

==== Socialist reformers ====
Next, Belloc highlights differences between three kinds of reformers – two types of socialist reformer and the "Practical Man" – and how each approach affects the proletarian mass whom they attempt to help. Socialist reformers are divided into two types, which "between them they cover the whole Socialist movement": "the man who regards public ownership [...] as the only feasible solution of our modern social ills" and "the man who loves the Collectivist ideal in itself, who does not pursue it so much because it is a solution of modern Capitalism, as because it is an ordered and regular form of society which appeals to him in itself".

The first socialist reformer, while he intends to dispossess the capitalist of the means of production, cannot do it by confiscating them into the public hands of the state. Belloc cites the earlier universal respect for property, which gives the public a distaste for nationalization, and the reluctance of the capitalist to hand over his productive property. A rational socialist will realize that this seizure is impossible and attempt to "buy out" the means of production. Belloc believes that the socialist believes this is possible only "based upon an economic error". The capitalist class then sees that the reformer can be used to strengthen his own position. Collectively, capitalists agree to certain duties – such as providing occupational health and safety and a minimum wage – and discharge them in exchange for certain rights and privileges, giving them an institutionalized role within the state; by securing institutional protections for duties that overall benefit him, owners of the means of production insulate themselves from external pressures they would otherwise face. Although this works to the benefit of the capitalist, Belloc believes this kind of socialist acts in good faith, writing:

In this way the Socialist whose motive is human good and not mere organisation is being shepherded in spite of himself away from his Collectivist ideal and towards a society in which the possessors shall remain possessed [and] the dispossessed shall remain dispossessed [...] At the end of the process you will have two kinds of men, the owners economically free, and controlling to their peace and to the guarantee of their livelihood the economically unfree non-owners. But that is the Servile State.

Belloc refers to this process as "canalization". The term serves as a metaphor to describe how capital, with or without forethought to do so, makes certain concessions to labor, which over the long-term secure the capitalist class as an institutionalized addendum of the state. He describes it thus:

This idealist social reformer, therefore, finds the current of his demand canalised. As to one part of it, confiscation, it is checked and barred; as to the other, securing human conditions for the proletariat, the gates are open. Half the river is dammed by a strong weir, but there is a sluice, and that sluice can be lifted. Once lifted, the whole force of the current will run through the opportunity so afforded it; there will it scour and deepen its channel; there will the main stream learn to run.

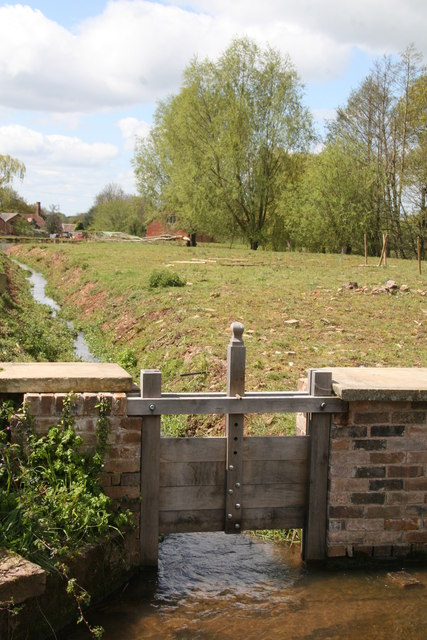
A sluice allows water to rush in a controlled direction and erode out a canal. Belloc uses the flow of water as a metaphor for increasing socialist reform movements, who are funneled into the canal by capital, represented as a sluice operator.

With respect to the second socialist reformer, Belloc believes that he is "directed by nothing more intense than a mechanical appetite for regulation"; that is, he is more inclined to order than to justice. Socialism is, to him, an ideal type of organization, but this kind of reformer would be contented by a substantial increase in the organization of society, with or without socialism. Like the previous reformer, he attempts in vain to confiscate – which would give him perfect control – and then to "buy out" capitalist property, but, in his failure, reorients his path towards simply arranging society into something "orderly in the extreme". Belloc writes:

To such a man the Servile State is hardly a thing towards which he drifts, it is rather a tolerable alternative to his ideal Collectivist State, which alternative he is quite prepared to accept and regards favourably. [...] The so-called "Socialist" of this type has not fallen into the Servile State by miscalculation. He has fathered it; he welcomes its birth, he foresees his power over its future.

==== The "Practical Man" ====
Principally, socialist reformers are up against the third, much larger group of reformers, the "Practical Man" – a person who is proudly not a socialist but still recognizes the need for some reforms – whom Belloc considers to be the reformer with the most influence, given his numbers in the general public and in the legislatures. The practical reformer, Belloc holds, cannot define his moral imperatives and cannot follow logically from his own actions, both of which "proceed from one simple and deplorable form of impotence, the inability to think". Despite not knowing it, this reformer has similar moral principles to most people and there are two principles which he holds to be intolerable: insufficiency and insecurity. Although he abhors both, when they become "flesh and blood" as unemployment and destitution, he refuses to act: he will not give to charities, because the provisions are too temporary; he will not allow public work projects, because the impoverished may lose the employment just as they lost their previous work; and he will not help other poor people because he believes they are unemployable, drunks, or continue to have children they cannot support. He holds these views, and others, because he accepts uncritically that the impoverished are reaping the consequences of their actions, not that they have been robbed of the "co-operative and instinctive institutions [...] society spontaneously breeds" and, in doing so, "gloats on every new detail in the building up of [the Servile State]" and "the destruction of freedom by inches". Left to his own devices, this practical reformer would create, through his own ignorance and ineptitude, the conditions for revolt and substantive change, but he continuously compromises with the ownership class "who use him with gratitude and contempt" and guide him toward servility rather than reform. Belloc did not believe that these practical men would persist into the servile state, writing that, the servile state "with its powerful organisation and necessity for lucid thought in those who govern, will certainly eliminate him".

==== Outlook of the proletariat ====
Belloc writes that need for security and sufficiency is also felt among the proletariat, even those who have not experienced poverty. He states that the system developing at the time of his writing, particularly beginning with the generation raised under the Education Acts onward, was actively demoralizing the proletariat by causing them to believe that proprietorship was no longer possible for them or that it was not something they should want anyway and by considering the ownership class as distinct and superior, the object of uniform obedience and common envy, if often hatred, and having foundational rights "believe[d] to be immemorial". Belloc further references what he calls the "gambling chance" of capitalism – the belief that social mobility upward is a possibility for people who work hard – but that even this belief, he says, is shrinking out of existence. He says that the proletariat no longer see themselves as anything but proletarian. For the proletarian, property is no longer a feasible possibility, but, since he views himself only as a wage-earner, all he wants is an increase in wages.

Belloc sees this outlook as cause for concern. He states that if any of the wage-earners were to be offered a contract by his employer to become a permanent employee, guaranteeing their employment at a reasonable wage, the wage-earner would eagerly accept. Under these circumstances, Belloc writes, what is agreed upon is no longer a contract, but the acceptance of status; the worker surrenders the entirety of his surplus value and his freedom in exchange for security and sufficiency. Further, workers will not protect themselves from their employer even when the law itself is designed to protect him because he fears retribution from his employer more than the law itself. In this, Belloc notes that "public law" has been superseded by a kind of "private law"; that is, the relationship of status between the owner and the worker carries with it the implication that certain actions against the private will of the owner will lead to unemployment or a loss of wages and the possibility of punishment under that system is more worrisome to the worker than whatever the public legal system would be able to impose.

This process is not immediate; it can only develop over time, but the time it takes only solidifies its presence. Belloc suggests that if the words "employee" and "employer" were replaced with "serf" and "master" respectively, there would be immediate upheaval and if the conditions of the servile state were immediately imposed on the masses, they would revolt against it. However, since the foundations have been laid, according to Belloc, and have built up over time, they have allowed for increases in servility and a changing status of citizens into the dual-class system of servility without revolt.

=== Critique of contemporary law ===
Belloc did not believe his thesis was entirely predictive; he held that the transitional stage from capitalism to the servile state was already in motion during his lifetime. Among these he includes minimum wage laws, employer liability laws, the National Insurance Act 1911, and compulsory arbitration.

==== Defining servile laws ====
What distinguishes the Servile State is not the interference of the law with the action of any citizen even in connection with industrial matters. Such interference may or may not indicate the presence of a Servile status. It in no way indicates the presence of that status when it forbids a particular kind of human action to be undertaken by the citizen as a citizen.

— Hilaire Belloc, The Servile State, The Servile State Has Begun, pp. 109–110

Belloc makes clear that he does not believe that most laws affecting the rights and duties of labor or capital fall within the scope of servility. The Factory Acts, for example, do not fit within the scope of servility. Providing for the protection of labor in industrial settings and limiting the number hours labor can work, the laws protect citizens as citizens, not as employees or indentured persons. Even laws which appear to be restrictive or oppressive on the population are not themselves necessarily leading to servility according to Belloc's narrow definition. Servile laws are only those which establish or further any distinctions between citizens as belonging to different classes "legally distinct from the other by a criterion of manual labour or income". Laws which protect citizens are not servile – even if they are restrictive or bind them to certain duties – unless they are explicitly responsible for duties or are protected against certain actions as members of either the capitalist or proletarian classes, respectively.

To explain this further, Belloc uses the example of a property owner with a river on his land. If the river is subject to flooding, the state may require him to take precautions – such as building a fence to a prescribed specification – to protect the surrounding areas from the flood. Because the state must recognize the owner of the property as such to compel him to build the fence, the state confers on him a particular status; he is the owner and has particular duties as such. This, however, still does not meet the criterion of a servile law because the law does not make any class distinction between the owner and non-owner. In other words, ownership is incidental; the purpose of the law is to protect the surrounding area and it does not replace any contract of labor with a delineation of status. For Belloc, "such legislation may be oppressive in any degree or necessary in any degree, but [if] it does not establish status in the place of contract, [then] it is not, therefore, servile".

==== Contrasting responsibility ====
Employer liability laws are the first example of servile laws Belloc examines, but he points out that the laws were probably not passed with servility in mind; many servile laws begin as "humane" attempts to better the conditions of working class people. He offers up the following example of a plowman:

- Citizen A offers to Citizen B a sack of wheat to plow an area that may or may not produce more than a sack of wheat, but likely produces more.
- Citizen B freely agrees to the contract and is bound to fulfill it.
- During the plowing, Citizen B destroys a pipe on Citizen A's land that conveys water to Citizen C's land through a prior arrangement between Citizen A and Citizen C, causing damage to Citizen C's land.

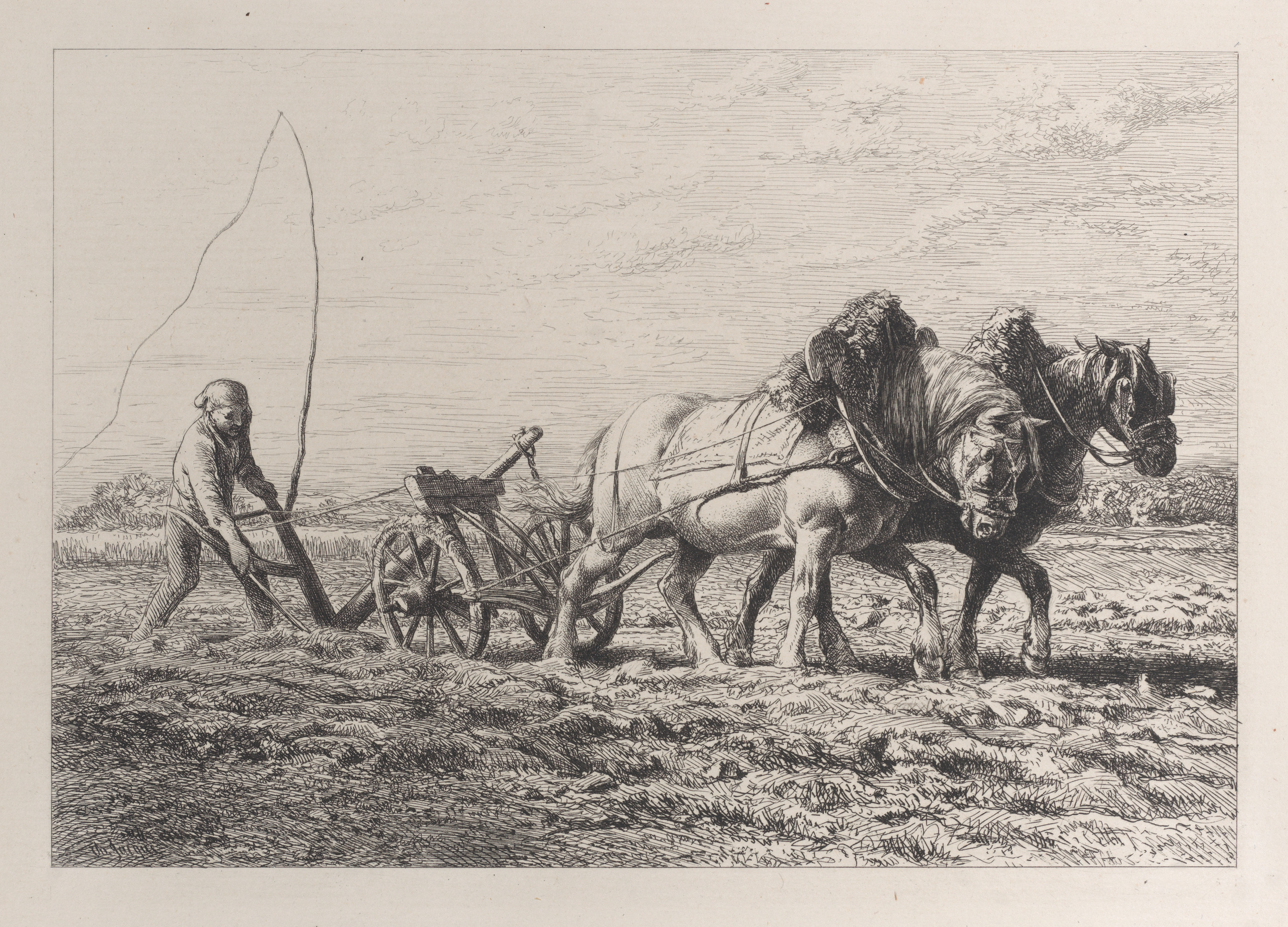
Citizen B (pictured) plows a plot of land for Citizen A and accidentally damages Citizen C's land. (Image: Plowing by Charles Jacque, 1864)

Under the law, Citizen A, the employer, has certain duties which correspond to the rights of Citizen B, the employee. Under a perfectly equal system, contracted between two equal and free citizens, Citizen B is aware of the risks and costs of such a contract; any damage he incurs, he would be fully responsible for. Nevertheless, under the extant system, Citizen B is afforded certain privileges he would not otherwise have. For example, if Citizen B hurts himself while plowing or is wounded by the plow or draft animal, he is entitled to certain damages from Citizen A which increase his share of wheat. However, there is no converse responsibility of Citizen B to confer particular remuneration to Citizen A unless he is "culpably negligent or remiss". The law therefore does not consider Citizen B to be a free man making a free contract; he is considered legally distinct from the owner, protected by certain rights provided at the expense of his freedom. Further, Citizen A is considered responsible for any accidents that Citizen B incurs. Under the equal system, if Citizen B ruins part of Citizen C's land, Citizen B is wholly responsible for the damage. Under the extant system, Citizen A is an employer because Citizen B is considered to be an employee working on the behalf of Citizen A.

This status affects the relationship between members of the same class as well. Belloc gives another example:

- Citizen A offers Citizen B and Citizen D to dig a well for him for one sack of wheat each.
- Citizen B lowers Citizen D into a hole by rope to begin digging.
- Citizen B lets the rope slip out of his hands, thereby injuring Citizen D.

Under a perfectly equal system, where all three persons are free citizens, responsibility for Citizen D's injuries falls squarely on Citizen B. However, due to the particular status of Citizen B and Citizen D, responsibility for the injury falls on Citizen A instead. Belloc sums it up in this way:

Now in all this it is quite clear that A has peculiar duties not because he is a citizen, but because he is something more: an employer; and B and D have special claims on A, not because they are citizens, but because they are something less: viz. employees. They can claim protection from A, as inferiors of a superior in a State admitting such distinctions and patronage.

In a footnote, Belloc argues that a distinction can still be found between contracts which are considered working class, which are more protected and thus more "inferior", and those which are considered "professional class". A publisher who contracts a writer to produce a history book would not be responsible if, in the process of investigating a historical artifact, the writer falls in a pit and injures himself. However, if that same publisher were to hire the same man to clean a fountain and he were to injure himself in the process, the publisher would then be liable for the injuries.

==== Types of servile laws ====
Belloc further makes clear that the laws are not the origins of the servile state; they do not create the system of servility. Rather, they are the foundations of the servile order. Servile laws fall into three categories:

- Laws that provide relief to the proletariat
- Laws that guarantee provisions for the proletariat
- Laws that compel the proletariat to work without contract

The National Insurance Act 1911 is Belloc's prime example of the first kind of servile law because "its fundamental criterion is employment" and it "puts the duty of controlling the proletariat and of seeing that the law is obeyed not on the proletariat itself, but upon the Capitalist class". The law applies where an employee is protected against circumstances outside of his control, such as illness, under the condition that he exchanges his services for goods and either works for less than a certain amount of those services or works specifically in labor.

The second and third categories are complementary, according to Belloc. The examples he uses are minimum wage laws and compulsory arbitration, neither of which were law at the time of Belloc's writing. The minimum wage pins the effort of labor to that wage, allowing the capitalist to retain all of the surplus value that extends beyond it, irrespective of how much. For Belloc:

It would give to both parties what each immediately requires: to capital a guarantee against disturbance; to labour sufficiency and security. [...] The Capitalist, on his side, is guaranteed in the secure and permanent expectation of that surplus value through all the perils of social envy; the Proletarian is guaranteed in a sufficiency and a security for that sufficiency; but by the very action of such a guarantee there is withdrawn from him the power to refuse his labour and thus to aim at putting himself in possession of the means of production. Such schemes definitely divide citizens into two classes, the Capitalist and the Proletarian. They make it impossible for the second to combat the privileged position of the first.

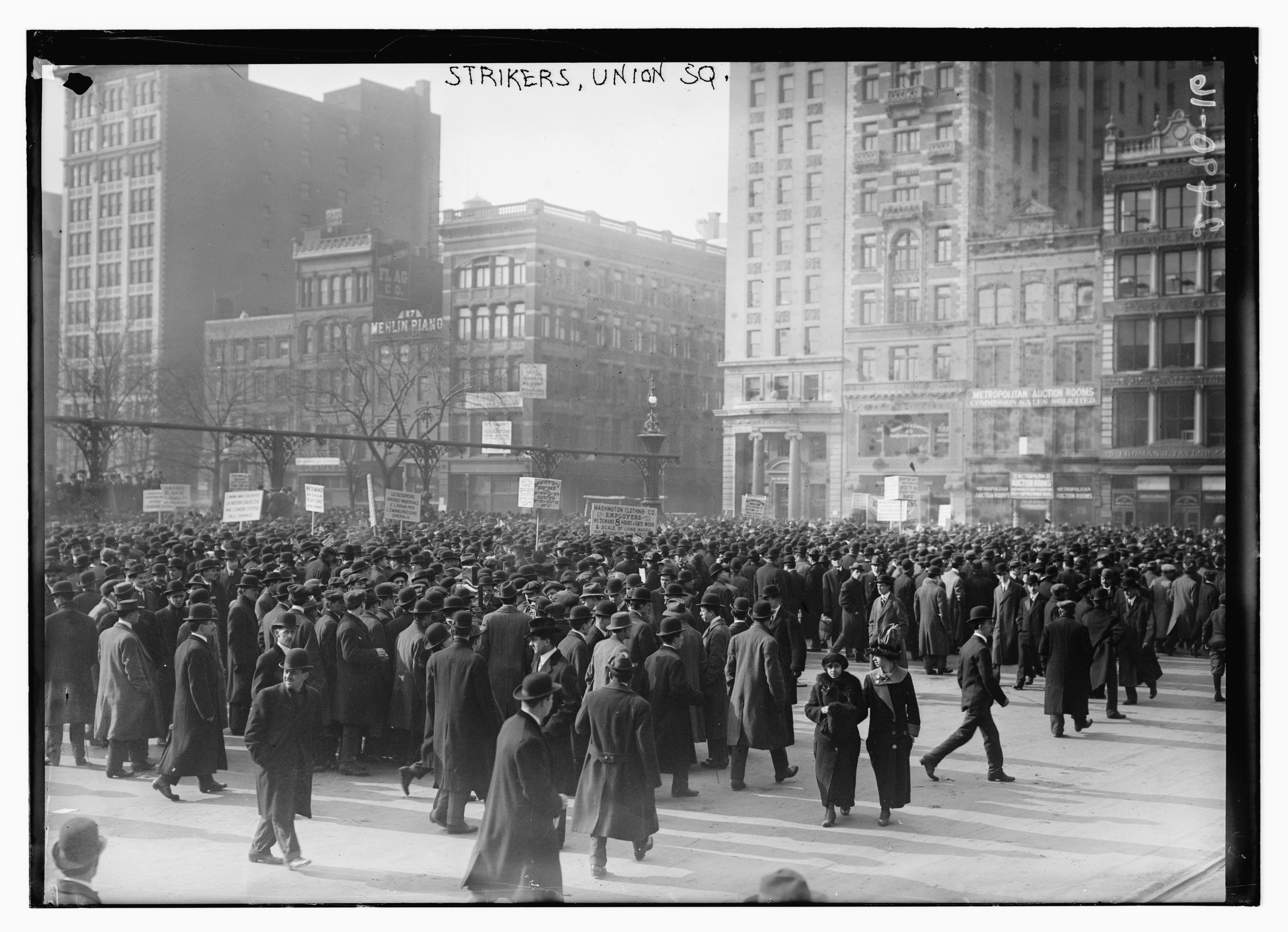
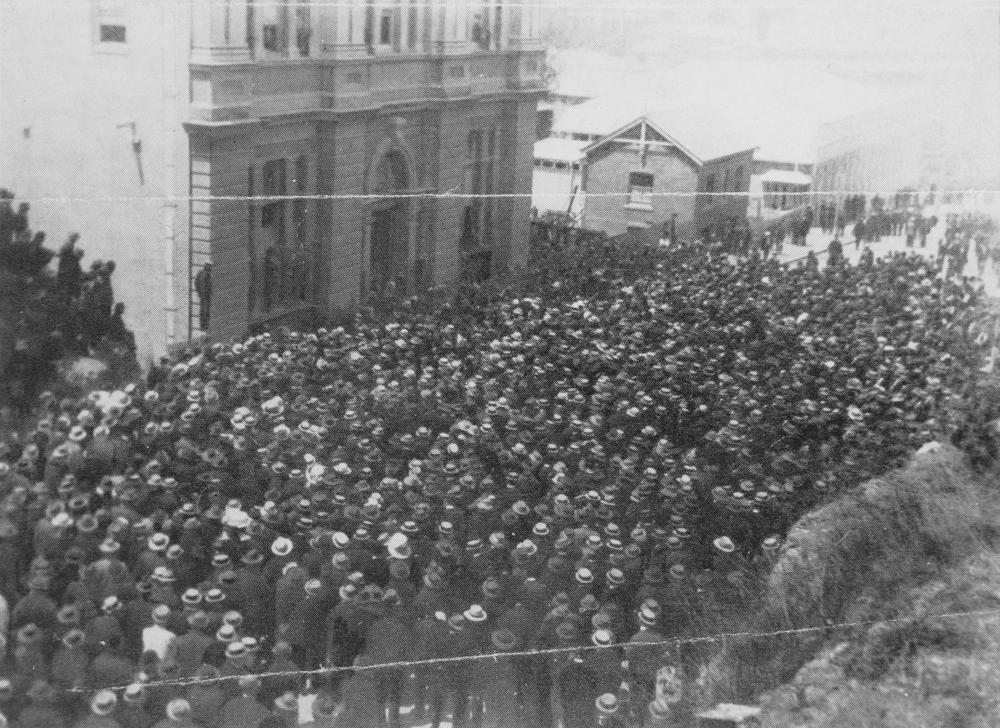
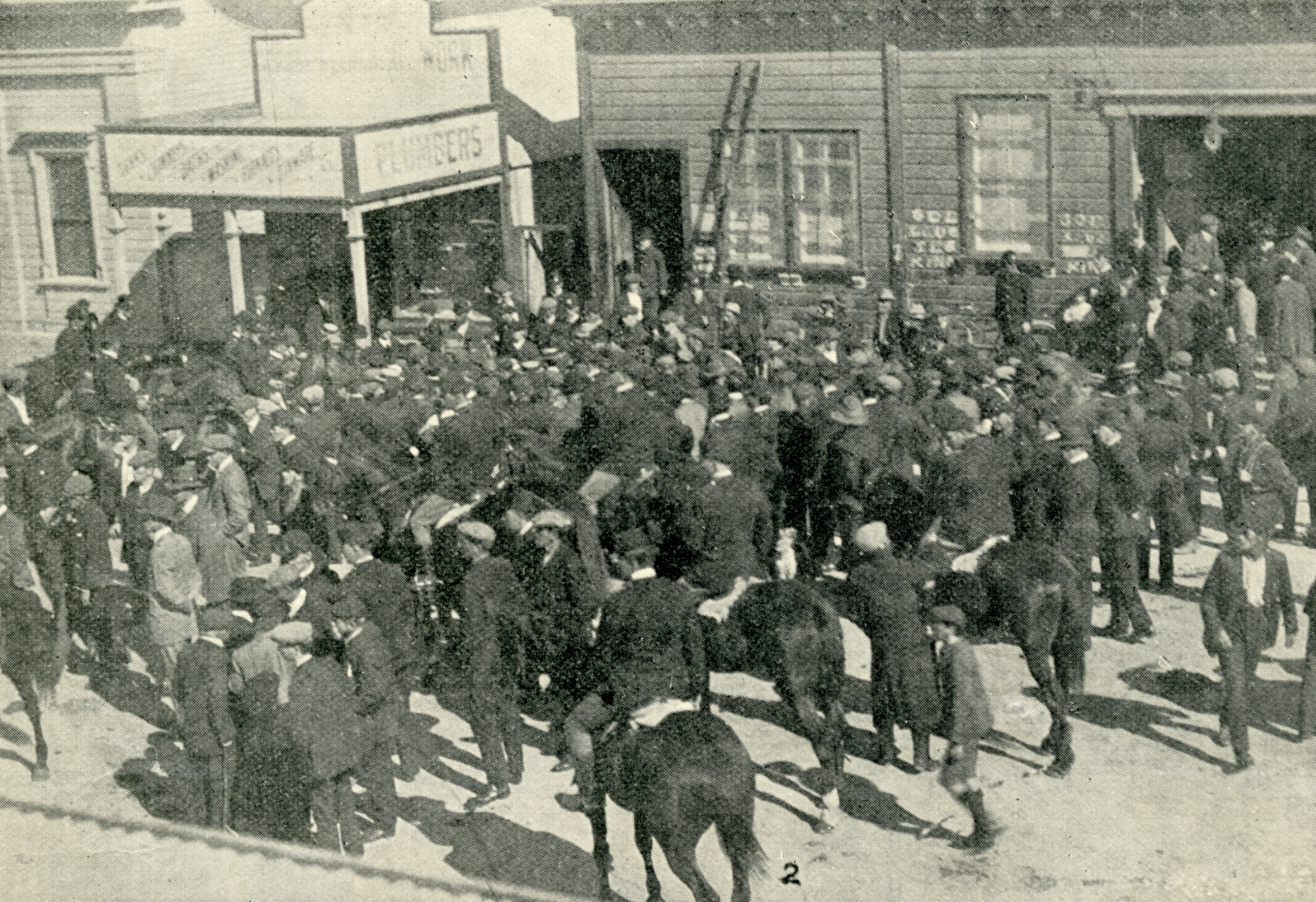
Strikes in 1912; from left to right: Clothing strike in Union Square (United States), 1912 Brisbane general strike (Australia), and Black Tuesday (New Zealand)

Belloc takes particular issue with the Parliamentary debate regarding the minimum wage laws, using the 1912 United Kingdom national coal strike as an example. He writes that the debate prior to the passing of the Coal Mines Act did not center around possible avenues for avoiding the minimum wage, such as allowing the miners to obtain possession of the mines for themselves, nor did it center around the state intervening or socializing the mines, but rather resigning themselves to debating what minimum wage would be "satisfactory" to provide for the security and sufficiency of the workers. Still more, there was no effort on the part of the capitalist class nor the proletariat to resist that change in any way; both agreed to the terms.

According to Belloc, the strike itself caused a panic. While the capitalist class usually likes certain margins of destitution, converting desperation into lower wages thus widening its profit margins, it knows this desperation is unsustainable. Moreover, successful strikes increase the likelihood of more strikes and, wanting to clamp down on the number of nationally indispensable industries that strike, the state and capital will attempt to placate labor to some degree. This, in turn, leads to the examination and definition of certain persons and conditions that will be subject to benefits like unemployment insurance to ensure that they are not abused, giving way to more legal distinctions between working class and owning class.

The means by which this system of benefits exists is not self-perpetuating; it requires goods and services to be sold for money which would then be divided between capital and labor. Both groups, having agreed to circumstances which provide security and sufficiency, enter into what Belloc calls a "quasi-contract", which has all the legal weight of an equal contract but otherwise compels one party to labor by positive law. The courts are able to exert force over the contract, punishing violations by either party and compelling them to behave in accordance with the contract. When the labor is completed, capital and labor are both given their cut and labor is compelled by law to surrender part of it for unemployment benefits. However, should a worker refuse to take part in labor stipulated by the contract, thereby removing the ability of the insurance to perpetuate itself, he is not allowed to partake in its benefits even though he has paid into the system. Moreover, the laborer has no control over the sums which are taken from his payment, which rests solely in the hands of an official who can legally determine whether the laborer is legitimately unemployed in a way that permits him the very funds that he was forced to set aside. Belloc similarly compares compulsory arbitration, which he considers to be "a bludgeon so obvious that it is revolting even to our proletariat".

In some cases, according to Belloc, there are some in labor who cannot – through ignorance, incapacity, or laziness – provide enough surplus value to meet the cost of their minimum wage; in other words, there are some workers who are so inefficient as to be worth less than the minimum wage that must be provided to them. In this case, every effort is expended by the state to either place him into work in which he can efficiently provide his labor or educate him in a way that allows him to meet the sufficiency or at least come as close to it as possible, "lest his presence as a free labourer should imperil the whole scheme of the minimum wage, and introduce at the same time a continuous element of instability". Belloc suggests that the servile state may consider prison labor to be a long-term solution, preceding other forms by making less obvious forms of compulsion "more certain, facile, and rapid".

=== Ownership loan problem ===
Belloc comments that no socialists were engaged in municipalization or nationalization, which he considered to be "the very essence of Collectivist Reform". On the contrary, municipalities and national industry were being loaned capitalist property, namely railroads and railroad cars, which Belloc considered to be "small sections of the means of production". These loans are not monetary, but are rather a set of exchanges in property. The capitalist will not agree to any deal without the guarantee that whatever he would have made will be paid back and an additional lump sum called a sinking fund with the continued restoration of the old surplus value considered under the term interest. In theory, this process should allow certain sections of the means of production to be slowly socialized, taken away from the capitalist pool of resources and into the public administration.

However, in practice this is not possible, according to Belloc, for three reasons: "the fact that the implements are always sold at much more than their true value; the fact that the purchase includes non-productive things; and the fact that the rate of borrowing is much faster than the rate of repayment". Further prohibitive costs include legal costs and bribes in order to secure the means of production from a capitalist who is reluctant to part with them, even at a profit. Even so, trains represent the best-case scenario because they are productive property and serve as a long-term investment for the state or capital to invest in. Moreover, it assumes the state is able to meet or exceed the success rate of capitalist enterprise, which, Belloc says, can hardly be guaranteed. It also presumes that whatever is bought will not be quickly made obsolete by innovation and invention. He writes that this not only makes the state indebted to capital, but also serves to strengthen the position of capital on the whole.

== Reception ==
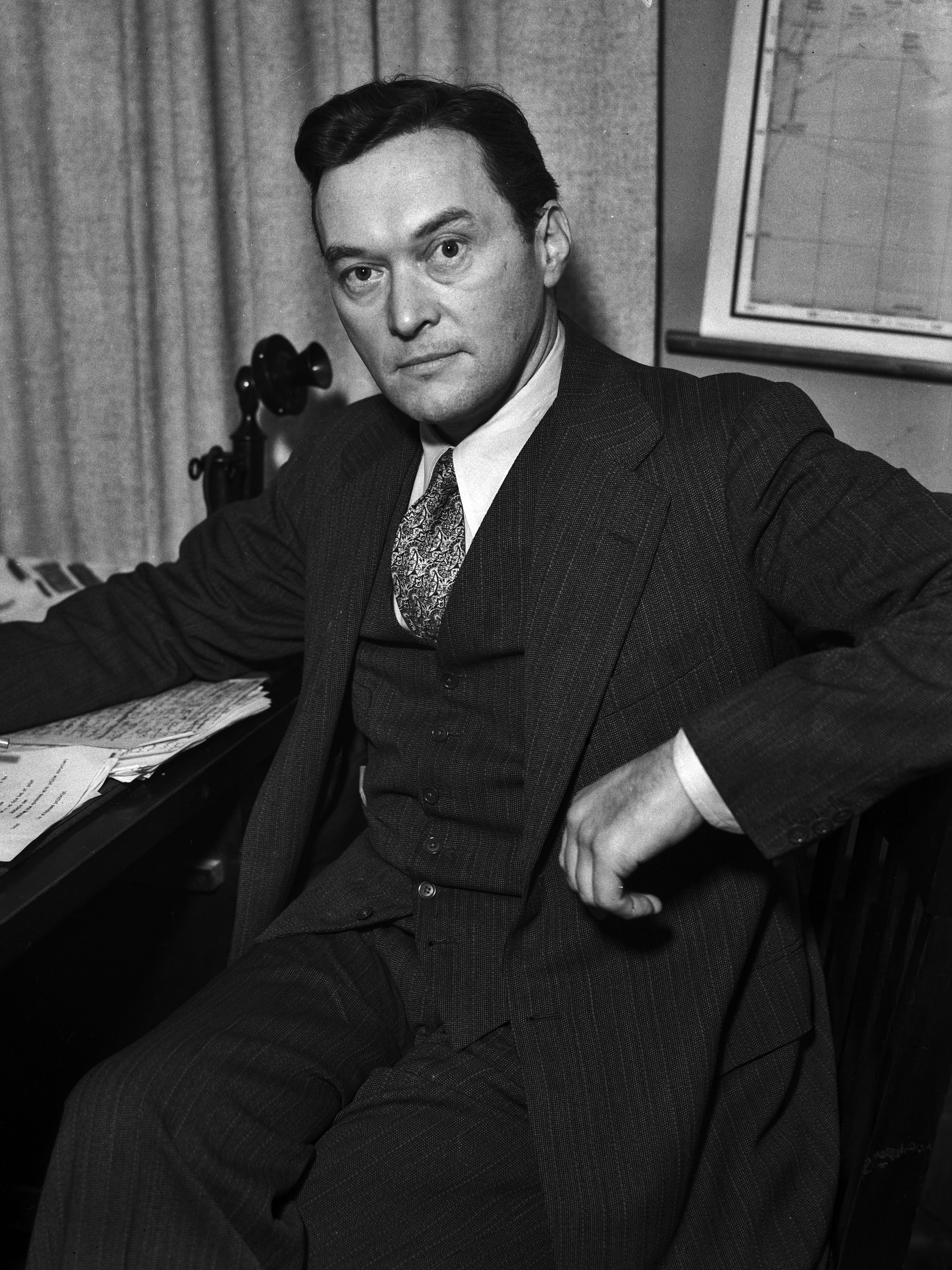
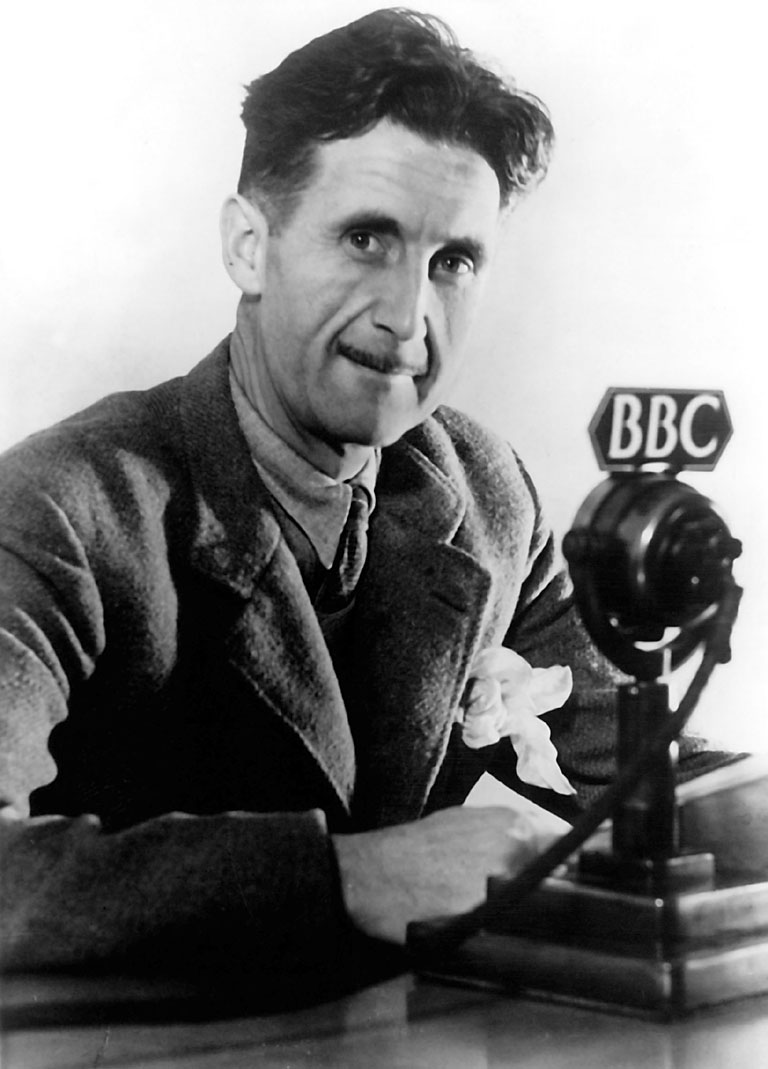
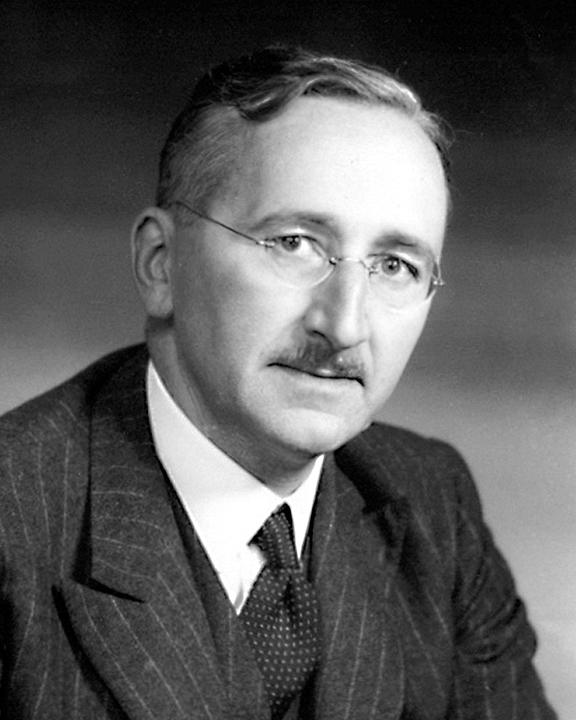
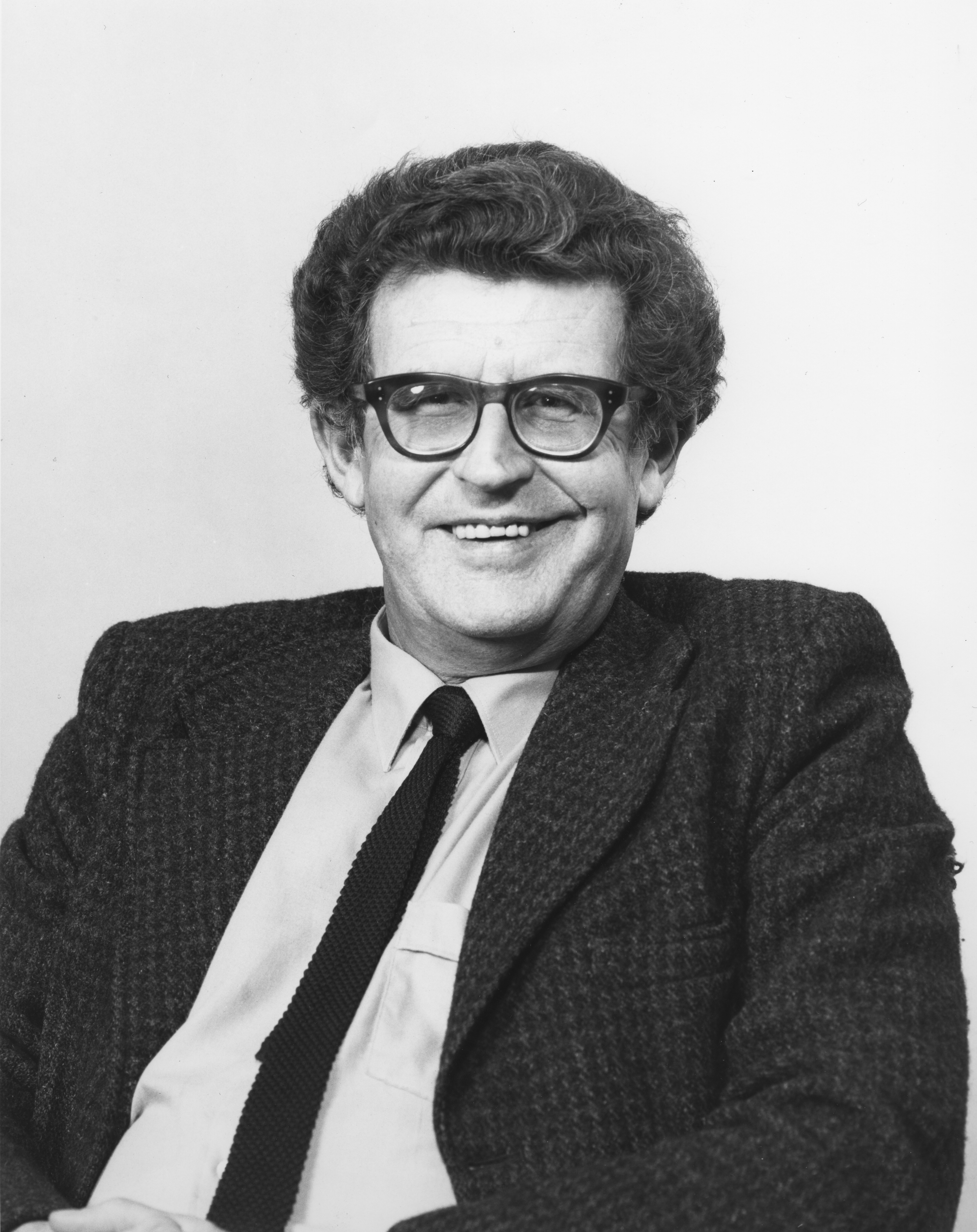
Many prominent political commentators from across the political spectrum have referenced The Servile State in their works. From left to right, top to bottom: Walter Lippmann, George Orwell, Friedrich Hayek, and Kenneth Minogue

Since its publication, reception of The Servile State has been generally positive. The book has appealed to many from across the political spectrum, even those who did not agree with Belloc in historiography, economics, or his proposed solution, including socialists and classical liberals. In general, criticism has centered around Belloc's well-known biases – particularly with regards to his historiography – and reluctance to propose any pragmatic solution.

While early praise focused on its criticisms of capitalism and socialism, later praise – particularly during and after the Second World War – is placed on Belloc's conception of servility and how it developed. Several observers, such as Walter Lippmann and George Orwell, have called the work prophetic. Today, the book is uniformly considered a foundational text of distributist economic theory.

=== Initial response ===
A 1912 review in The Guardian suggested Belloc's embrace of widespread property ownership seemed "impracticable for a proletarian population with no appreciable margin for saving and with no adequate spirit of cooperation." The following year, a column in The New York Times by Charlotte Payne-Townshend, wife of Belloc's friend and intellectual rival George Bernard Shaw, called the book an "all-important contribution to economics".

In his 1914 book, A Preface to Politics, the Pulitzer Prize–winning American journalist Walter Lippmann remarked on the accuracy of Belloc's criticisms of socialism, writing: "Without any doubt socialism has within it the germs of that great bureaucratic tyranny which Chesterton and Belloc have named the Servile State". Lippmann later called The Servile State a "landmark of political thought in this century" when the book was republished in 1979.

In 1917, Irish republican Arthur Clery wrote an article which argued in part supporting Belloc's thesis as a blueprint for a new Irish state, comparing the prescience of Belloc's servile state to Edmund Burke's predictions of the Reign of Terror after the French Revolution. Praising Belloc's critiques of both capitalism and socialism. Most of the article's discussion of The Servile State centers around Belloc's historiographical claims and the role of the Reformation, but it also is a call to action for a new Irish state to adopt the economic reforms with these concepts in mind.

In a 1917 book on cooperative economics entitled Self-Government in Industry, G. D. H. Cole references The Servile State several times. A believer in guild socialism, Cole opposed state ownership of the means of production without subordination to self-government in labor, arguing that without self-government, industry is on "the high road to the Servile State". (Note: Cole uses this phrase to describe those who condemn any nationalization at all. In his view, nationalization must be married with self-government or "after a voyage almost as lasting as that of the Flying Dutchman, we round in the end the Cape of State Capitalism, we shall only find ourselves on the other side in a Saragossa Sea of State Socialism, which will continue to repress all initiative, clog all endeavour, and deny all freedom to the workers".) In defending aspects of Belloc's thesis, which he considered ubiquitously known among his audience and "at least half untrue", Cole writes:

Low wages, supplemented by benevolent and considerate management, may secure a fair standard of material comfort for the employee; but they are demoralising and degrading; they produce a spirit of subornation and acquiescence, in which the Guild idea cannot grow. They breed such stuff as Nietzsche's 'Ultimate Men,' servile in word and thought and act. High wages, on the other hand, are themselves an incitement to demand higher; where they are combined with hard or bureaucratic management, they are the forerunners and creators of revolt.

Cole considered the arguments of the National Guildsmen to be nearly identical to those of distributists and Belloc himself, but importantly diverging where the former advocate for nationalization and the latter two for labor itself to own productive property. Cole further praises Belloc for his pressing critique of "buy out" socialism, which Cole viewed as slow and inefficient and merely state capitalism rather than socialism, lamenting that socialists were failing to distinguish between socialization and nationalization.

In 1920, Eileen Power negatively referenced the book in an article for academic journal History on the guild system in medieval England, calling it a "grotesque account of the appearance of capitalism" and the historicity of Belloc's distributive state "mythical".

=== Mid-century resurgence ===
Although The Servile State received modest attention during the interwar period, it gained a renewed interest during the Second World War, which persisted into the Cold War era.

In 1941, the guild socialist Maurice Reckitt, (Note: Some commentators have considered Reckitt to have been a distributist rather than a guild socialist.) who – along with G. D. H. Cole – co-founded the National Guilds League in 1915, reflected in his autobiography: "I cannot overestimate the impact of this book on my mind, and in this I was but symptomatic of thousands of others."

Austrian School economist Friedrich von Hayek referenced The Servile State in his own book The Road to Serfdom, first published 1944. In it, he subtitles the chapter entitled "Economic Control and Totalitarianism" with a quote from The Servile State: "The control of the production of wealth is the control of human life itself." (Note: The quote itself is paraphrased; the original reads: "Therefore, to control the production of wealth is to control human life itself.") Later writers have considered The Road to Serfdom to be a "kind of sequel to" The Servile State, due to its rebuke of socialism and its support for some of the elements of classical liberalism.

A 1943 review by Christopher Hollis, a Conservative MP, gave a strong defense of the book in the Irish journal Studies. Hollis wrote that even though Belloc had written the book prior to the First World War, "it is surprising how well on the whole his analysis has stood up to the extraordinary changes of the last thirty years", while admitting the book had made some invalid conclusions.

In 1945, Dorothy Day wrote a positive review of the book, stating that Belloc "foresaw the present shape of things so clearly" and lamented that the book had never theretofore been published in the United States. She ended her review by appealing for the book to be published and circulated. The book was published in the United States the following year. Day exhorted her readers to read four books as introductory works to distributism: G. K. Chesterton's What's Wrong with the World? and The Outline of Sanity and Belloc's The Servile State and An Essay on the Restoration of Property.

In his 1940 essay Notes on the Way, George Orwell stated that the book "foretold with astonishing accuracy the things that are happening now", but despairs that there is "little question now of averting a collectivist society [...] whether it is to be founded on willing cooperation or on the machine-gun". Orwell believed that Belloc offered a false dichotomy and criticized the infeasibility of the distributist answer to such a dichotomy, writing: "But unfortunately [Belloc] had no remedy to offer. He could conceive nothing between slavery and a return to small-ownership, which is obviously not going to happen and in fact cannot happen." In a 1946 article for Polemic entitled "Second Thoughts on James Burnham", Orwell revisited the book, describing it as written in a "tiresome style" and arguing that the remedy it suggested was "impossible". However, he considered that it foretold the sorts of things that were happening in the 1930s with "remarkable insight". In the article, Orwell compares James Burnham's theory of managerialism to Belloc's servile state in order to demonstrate that Burham's conception was neither new nor inevitable as demonstrated by the likes of Belloc.

In 1946, Foreign Affairs added The Servile State to their reading list for economics and social theory.

In 1946, a review in Social Science was mixed. On the one hand, it criticized the historicity of Belloc's distributive state, noting that "an unprejudiced Belloc would find a much closer approximation of his Distributive State in our own [American] Frontier Society". Still, the review is overall quite positive, commending Belloc for his "courageous" indictment of capitalism, particularly in his conception of the "politically free and economically unfree" paradigm and his assertion regarding "the gap between our moral pretenses and our actual practices".

=== Modern reception ===
In a 1979 article for periodical Modern Age, Frederick Wilhelmsen reviewed the book after a new reprinting, calling the book "an early twentieth-century masterpiece" and remarking that the work "still runs through edition after edition and men today still ponder the sobering thesis advanced by its author". Calling the book "principally an exercise in logic", he compares some of its conclusions favorably to those of William Cobbett, who, like Belloc, also opposed the Poor Law of 1834 and condemned the traditional British view of the Reformation.

In a 1990 article for the journal First Things, moral philosopher and neo-Marxist social critic Christopher Lasch referenced The Servile State in a critique of conservative concessions to capital, which he believed were contrary to conservative moral values. He wrote that, shortly after Belloc's writing, only two groups "of the left" held consistent, legitimate criticism about the development of the servile state: distributists, who wanted to restore widespread ownership of property, and syndicalists and guild socialists, who sought co-operative ownership of private property.

Kenneth Minogue's 2010 book The Servile Mind was inspired by Belloc's book. Minogue described Belloc's book as "curious" and "eccentric in some ways even for his own time" and, although somewhat dated, he argued that it continues to offer valuable insights into the development of servility and overdependence on government largesse. Minogue used Belloc's book to expand on the idea of the "bribability" of the proletariat, arguing that the promise of future security provided by the state was conditioned on the acceptance of servile status and that "bribability" was indispensable to the cultivation of the servile mind. Minogue believed that Belloc was ahead of his time. He considered Belloc's example of the injured employee particularly useful, explicating Minogue's view of servility, namely that certain individuals and entities are given special status, as masters or serviles, which give them certain rights and responsibilities through legislative power rather than treating both as equal members of the state.

In the 2012 book Property-Owning Democracy: Rawls and Beyond, Oxford historian Ben Jackson compares Belloc's findings to those of American Founding Father Thomas Paine and Scottish Conservative politician Noel Skelton.

== See also ==
- Criticism of capitalism
- Criticism of socialism
- Distributism
- Liberation theology
- Catholic social teaching
- Capitalist Realism: Is There No Alternative?
- The Managerial Revolution
