= Managerial state =

Concept in political science

The "managerial state" is a concept used in critiquing modern procedural democracy. The concept is used largely, though not exclusively, in paleolibertarian, paleoconservative, and anarcho-capitalist critiques of late modern state power in Western democracies. Theorists Samuel T. Francis and Paul Gottfried, developing ideas inspired by the analytical framework of James Burnham, say this is an ongoing regime that remains in power, regardless of what political party holds a majority.

Variations on the concept include the therapeutic managerial state, welfare–warfare state, administrative state, and polite or soft totalitarianism. There is significant overlap between the concepts of the managerial state and the deep state, with theorists of the managerial state additionally drawing from theories of political religion and the secularization of Christian concepts, namely Puritanism, which they contend demand an overweening concern with government intervention in favor of social justice, unaccountable regulation of citizens' private lives, and both informally and formally enforced political correctness.

Theorists of the managerial state claim this constellation of factors tends towards the efflux of totalitarianism, which they call soft totalitarianism and engage in criticism of administrative law and rulemaking.

Samuel T. Francis, following James Burnham, said that under this historical process, “law is replaced by administrative decree, federalism is replaced by executive autocracy, and a limited government replaced by an unlimited state.” It acts in the name of abstract goals, such as freedom, equality, brotherhood or positive rights, and uses its claim of moral superiority, power of taxation and wealth redistribution to keep itself in power.

== Overview ==
=== Definition ===
Paul Gottfried, in After Liberalism, defines this worldview as a "series of social programs informed by a vague egalitarian spirit, and it maintains its power by pointing its finger accusingly at antiliberals." He calls it a new theocratic religion. In this view, when the managerial regime cannot get democratic support for its policies, it resorts to sanctimony and social engineering, via programs, court decisions and regulations.

In a more general way, Joseph Sobran argues that technology and false notions of progress give people a false sense of autonomy:

C.S. Lewis remarked that every increase in man's power over nature can turn out to mean an increase in the power of some men over others, with nature as its instrument. Given technological progress, we need to fight hard to retain our clarity about the nature and rights of human beings, or we face what Lewis called "the abolition of man." Abortion and totalitarianism both represent new possibilities of some men's power over others, and both are defended by certain ideologies of "progress." We hear of human "autonomy" and of man's "control of his own destiny." But the autonomy is enjoyed by a select (or self-selected) few, and the control is exercised by a shrinking elite; those who are powerless, whether unborn children or the subjects of a totalist dictatorship, simply don't count.

Thomas Fleming argues that the managerial problem extends to issues of war, peace and international order:

I prefer the old Adam of strife and carnage to the new Prometheus of peace and human rights. Better a world torn apart by Husseins and Qaddafis, better a war to the knife between the PLO and the Likud Party, between Zulus and Afrikaaners, than a world run by George Balls and Dag Hammarskjölds, because a world made safe for democracy is a world in which no one dares to raise his voice for fear that mommy will put you away some place where you can be reeducated."

=== Anarchy and tyranny ===
Samuel Francis argued that the problems of managerial state extend to issues of crime and justice. In 1992, he introduced the word “anarcho-tyranny” into the paleoconservative vocabulary. Francis argued that this situation extends across the U.S. and Europe but especially the UK. While the government functions normally, violent crime remains a constant, creating a climate of fear (anarchy) and the UK has a history of this and it continues to this day. He says that “laws that are supposed to protect ordinary citizens against ordinary criminals” routinely go unenforced, even though the state is “perfectly capable” of doing so. While this problem rages on, government elites concentrate their interests on law-abiding citizens. In fact, Middle America winds up on the receiving end of both anarchy and tyranny.

Other paleos have expanded upon Francis’ original idea. Paleolibertarian Lew Rockwell extended it to foreign policy, saying that the U.S. military unleashed this condition on the Iraqis. Fleming argues that the breakdown of the American system leaves a "country with a civilized elite class sitting on top of a powder-keg of anarchic welfare-dependents who can defy the government." This gives "encouragement to our own domestic rabble," endangering Middle America:

Does anyone remember the Rodney King riots? Watts? What happens every time a big city wins or loses a Superbowl [sic] or NBA championship? The next time you are in a large crowd – at a downtown pop concert or metro station – look around and imagine how many people on the street, if the lights went out and the cops disappeared, would be pulling the gold fillings out of the teeth in your dead body.

Jerry Pournelle provides his own variation on this theme:

We do not live by rule of law, because no one can possibly go a day without breaking one or another of the goofy laws that have been imposed on us over the years. No one even knows all the laws that apply to almost anything we do now. We live in a time of selective enforcement of law.

Francis argues that anarcho-tyranny is built into the managerial system and cannot be solved simply by fighting corruption or voting out incumbents. In fact, he says that the system generates a false “conservatism” that encourages people to act passively in the face of perpetual revolution. He concludes that only by devolving power back toward law-abiding citizens can sanity be restored.

In addition, Thomas Fleming describes anarcho-tyranny as "law without order: a constant busybodying about behavior that does not at all derive from a shared moral consensus." He suggests stoicism as a survival skill. He wrote,

the only response to this regime is to follow the boxing referee's advice: protect yourself at all times… The only freedom we have is the moral freedom that even ancient slaves enjoyed. Read Epictetus.

== Criticism of the center-right ==
Gottfried says paleoconservatives show contempt for the modern state, "not as an energizing force but as a leveling and homogenizing instrument." Conversely, he says mainstream conservatives no longer challenge the managerial system, except at the extremes. For example, decades of activism rolled back neither the New Deal nor the Great Society. He argues that classical conservatives wanted "traditional hierarchical society and a state that assumed the existing social arrangements," both of which today’s center-right rejects and condemns, while reinforcing “Western self-hate and self-indulgence.” He writes:

A political and cultural war has been fought and largely won by the social left against gender stereotyping and the nuclear family. Gay/lesbian and abortion rights, together with a powerful centralized administration enforcing them, are taken for granted by most members of Congress. Opposition to quotas and to the media's bashing of white males increasingly has become restricted to the political fringe. Only extremists now call for a debate on further immigration, which Beltway conservatives avoid bringing up lest they seem insensitive.

Gottfried also argues that the democratic center-right, such as the GOP, is not a restraining force against the managerial state. He says that such political leaders espouse a dubious moderation and accommodate the Left, while treating traditional conservative positions as political liabilities.

The center-right has gradually embraced most of the Left’s historical positions but has merely restated them with apparent moderation, for example, by rallying to the original, less radicalized form of feminism, by advocating an extensive welfare state with lower marginal tax rates, and by praising Martin Luther King while lying about his endorsement of racial quotas.... Equally important, if the "conservative movement" were as concerned about small-government as it is about waging global democratic wars, it might be influencing public opinion accordingly. Movement conservative leaders and the Republican Party have opted for big government and leftist missionary wars but not because of public demand. Rather they have worked long and hard to manufacture a demand for their interests.

In addition, Samuel Francis argued that since the center-right and center-left refuse to deal with major civilizational issues, they reduce domestic political debates to narrow economic issues. This preoccupation views human beings as “resources” and treats them like inanimate objects. Using a phrase from Peter Drucker, he says this

reflects the myth of Economic Man – that human beings are mainly or entirely economic in their motivations and that therefore the business of America is business, even if it takes the federal leviathan to conduct it or regulate it.

== Analysis ==
=== Criticism ===
In his essay Second Thoughts on James Burnham, George Orwell summarises Burnham's ideas in The Managerial Revolution and The Machiavellians and highlights perceived inconsistencies. Orwell concludes that Burnham may be right in identifying a general drift towards oligarchy with the concentration of industrial and financial power, and the development of the managerial/technical class. However, Orwell argues that Burnham's major error is in seeing this trend as continuing, and that in doing so, Burham makes two erroneous assumptions; that "Politics is essentially the same in all ages" and "Political behaviour is different from other kinds of behaviour." Orwell disagrees with these assumptions and argued that just as Nazism had smashed itself to pieces, so the Russian regime would destroy itself. "The huge, invincible, everlasting slave empire of which Burnham appears to dream will not be established, or if established, will not endure." Furthermore, Orwell characterises Burnham's critique of managerial state as representing a sort of 'power-worship', stating that "it is not surprising that Burnham's world view should often be noticeably close to that of the American imperialists on the one side, or to that of the isolationists on the other. It is a 'tough' or 'realistic' world-view which fits in with the American form of wish-thinking."

According to Christopher Hitchens, "Orwell was one of the very few commentators to see the sinister influence of [Burnham's] preachings, and subject these to a critique which greatly nettled Burnham himself."

== See also ==
- Woke capitalism
- Benevolent dictatorship
- Technocracy
- Meritocracy
- Managerial class
- Liberal elite
- Constitutional economics
- Political economy
- State within a state

== Sources ==
- Patrick J. Buchanan, September 14, 1992, "The Cultural War for the Soul of America", speech.
- Gottfried, Paul E., 1999, After Liberalism: Mass Democracy in the Managerial State. ISBN 0-691-05983-7
- –––, 2003, Multiculturalism and the Politics of Guilt: Toward a Secular Theocracy. ISBN 0-8262-1520-3
- James Kalb, "The Tyranny of Liberalism" (originally published as Liberalism, the Transcendent, and Restoration, in Modern Age, Summer, 2000).
- William S. Lind, 2000, "The Origins of Political Correctness", Accuracy in Academia.
- Lukacs, John, 1993, The End of the Twentieth Century and the End of the Modern Age. ISBN 0-395-58472-8
- Nisbet, Robert, 2003, The Present Age: Progress and Anarchy in Modern America. ISBN 0-86597-409-8
- –––, 2000, Twilight of Authority. ISBN 0-86597-211-7
- Roberts, Paul Craig and Lawrence Stratton, 1997, The New Color Line: How Quotas and Privilege Destroy Democracy. ISBN 0-89526-423-4
- Joseph Sobran, "How Tyranny Came to America", Sobran's, n.d.
