= Suicide of the West (Burnham book) =

1964 non-fiction book

Suicide of the West: An Essay on the Meaning and Destiny of Liberalism
- Cover of the 1964 John Day Co. edition
- Author: James Burnham
- Language: English
- Publisher: John Day Co.
- Publication date: 1964
- OCLC: 359839
- LC Class: JK271 .B728

Suicide of the West: An Essay on the Meaning and Destiny of Liberalism is a 1964 book by the American political philosopher James Burnham. The book provides a critique of liberal proceduralism, arguing it is not a solution to the problems facing Western civilization. Burhnam contends that liberalism is "syndrome" which will facilitiate the eventual collapse of Western Society and the rise of the total state. Suicide of the West remains influential among American conservatives, with Matthew Continetti calling Burnham's observations "...a dramatic modification of the way Americans understood democracy."

== Content ==
Burnham argues that the West has been shrinking since 1914 in three ways: geographically, demographically, and in political influence. He defines "the suicide of the West" not as a sudden act of destruction, but as an internal erosion of the will to survive and rule.

=== The Syndrome of Liberalism ===
The central argument of the book is that modern liberalism is the "ideology of Western withdrawal." Burnham does not view liberalism as the cause of the West's decline, but rather as a set of beliefs that makes that decline acceptable to the Western conscience.

Key elements of this "liberal syndrome" include:

- Guilt: through a tendency to feel responsible for the world's ills, liberals are unable to assert their own interests. The tenets of guilty institutions include an emphasis on the history behind colonialism, poverty, racism. Burnham argues this phenomenon is leading to a reluctance to assert Western interests as distinct from other interests.
- Rationalism: The belief that all human problems can be solved through education, negotiation, and social engineering.
- Egalitarianism: An obsession with equality that Burnham argues overlooks the inherent power dynamics necessary for maintaining a civilization. Burnham argues that society is premised on notions of hierarchy and natural order.

=== The "Internal Enemy" ===
Burnham suggests that because liberals dominate the major institutions of the West, they are not able to identify threats effectively. He posits that the liberal worldview is incapable of dealing with enemies who do not share their rationalist or humanitarian premises. Burnham applied this specifically to the Soviet Union and revolutionary movements in the Third World due to this text being written in 1964.

== Content and Structure ==
The book is divided into several sections that analyze the psychology of the liberal mind:

1. Geographical: Burnham provides data on the loss of Western-controlled territory between 1914 and 1964.
2. Liberal Rules: Burnham identifies a list of "propositions" he believes define the liberal worldview, such as the belief in the innate goodness of man and the primacy of universal peace.
3. Practical function of liberalism: Burnham concludes that liberalism allows the Western elite to feel moral while their civilization loses its influence. Liberalism provides a rationalization for the fundamental incompetence of many elites in a post-industrial and globalist society.

== Reception ==
According to The American Spectator, the book received "much acclaim from conservatives and much criticism by liberals".

According to a review by The Worthy House, some of Burnham's forecasts "turned out wrong," especially when taking into account historical developments.
