= The Managerial Revolution =

1941 book by James Burnham

The Managerial Revolution: What is Happening in the World
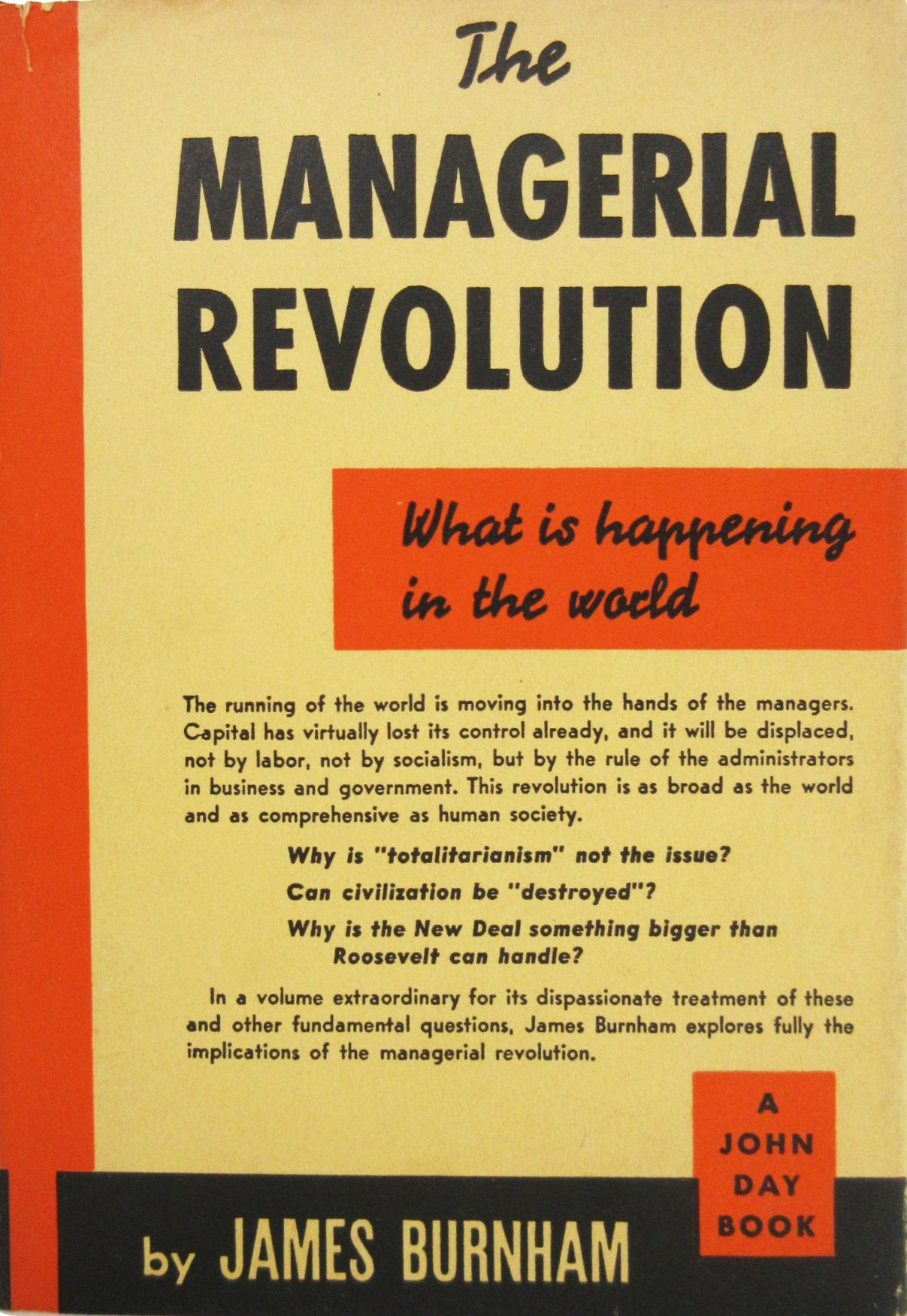
- First edition book cover
- Author: James Burnham
- Language: English
- Subject: Political philosophy, Political science, Sociology
- Publisher: John Day Company
- Publication date: 1941
- Publication place: United States
- Pages: 214

The Managerial Revolution: What is Happening in the World is a book written by James Burnham in 1941. It discusses the rise of managers and technocrats in modern industrial societies, arguing that they would replace the traditional capitalist class as the rulers of the economic system through mechanisms such as economic planning.

== Summary ==
Burnham's seminal work, The Managerial Revolution (1941), theorized about the future of world capitalism based upon its development in the interwar period. Burnham begins by saying, "It is a historical law, with no apparent exceptions so far known, that all social and economic groups of any size strive to improve their relative position with respect to power and privilege in society", and then weighs three possibilities:

1. Capitalism is a permanent form of social and economic organization and would continue indefinitely.
2. It is temporary and destined by its nature to collapse and be replaced by socialism.
3. It is currently being transformed into some non-socialist future form of society.

Since capitalism had a more-or-less definite beginning in the 14th century, it could not be regarded as an immutable and permanent form. Moreover, in the last years of previous economic systems such as those of Ancient Greece and the Roman Empire, mass unemployment was "a symptom that a given type of social organization is just about finished". The worldwide mass-unemployment of the Great Depression era thus indicated that capitalism was itself "not going to continue much longer".

Burnham agreed with Marxists that the capitalist class would inevitably lose the class struggle, but disagreed that they would lose to the working class due to this class being too disorganized and weak. He instead argued that a new class – the managerial class – would win against the capitalist class. Burnham sees this new class as the individuals engaged in "the tasks of the technical direction and coordination of the process of production". The managerial class includes "operating executives, superintendents, administrative engineers, supervisory technicians; or, in government ... administrators, commissioners, bureau heads, and so on".

According to Burnham, the managerial class has risen due to the increasing complexity and large scope of modern economies. Because doing certain tasks requires hyper specific technical knowledge, the capitalist class cannot perform all of the necessary tasks by themselves. This means that the capitalist class has to employ individuals who manage other individuals engaged in technical work. By doing this, the capitalist class has made themselves obsolete, since the managers are the individuals who actually control production. Although the managerial class is still employed by the capitalist class, Burnham argued that this arrangement was irreconcilable. This would eventually result in the managerial class who actually owns production seizing it from the capitalist class who owns it in name only. According to Burnham, the managerial class would seize power by implementing state ownership of production. Due to the complexity and large scale of modern economies, Burnham argues that this form of state ownership would prove more efficient than rule by individual capitalists. According to Burnham, the "managerial revolution" would result in the decline of capitalist democracy and the rise of managerial control of production while using "the unlimited state" as a vehicle.

Analyzing the emerging forms of society around the world, Burnham saw certain commonalities between the economic formations of Nazi Germany, Stalinist Russia, and the United States under Franklin D. Roosevelt with the New Deal. Burnham argued that in the short period since the First World War, a new society had emerged in which a social group or class of "managers" had waged a "drive for social dominance, for power and privilege, for the position of ruling class." For at least the previous decade, there had grown in America the idea of a "separation of ownership and control" of the modern corporation, notably expounded in The Modern Corporation and Private Property by Berle and Means. Burnham expanded this concept, arguing that whether ownership was corporate and private or statist and governmental, the essential demarcation between the ruling elite (executives and managers backed by bureaucrats and functionaries) and the mass of society was not ownership so much as control of the means of production. Burnham emphasized that "New Dealism", as he called it, "is not, let me repeat, a developed, systematized managerial ideology". Still, this ideology had contributed to American capitalism's moving in a "managerial direction", stating:

In its own more confused, less advanced way, New Dealism too has spread abroad the stress on the state as against the individual, planning as against private enterprise, jobs (even if relief jobs) against opportunities, security against initiative, "human rights" against "property rights." There can be no doubt that the psychological effect of New Dealism has been what the capitalists say it has been: to undermine public confidence in capitalist ideas and rights and institutions. Its most distinctive features help to prepare the minds of the masses for the acceptance of the managerial social structure.

Burnham argued that the power of the capitalist class would decline, while a new managerial class would rise to take its place, directing the state and industry. He described both Nazi Germany and the Soviet Union as having a managerial class based on an economic model he considered to be superior to liberal capitalism. Because of this, he incorrectly predicted that the Nazis would win World War II.

=== Deeper themes ===
The book explores the transformation of capitalism into a managerial society where the control and administrative decisions are made by a new class of managers rather than the traditional capitalists or the owners.

Description of capitalism

1. Individual ownership – capitalists own the factories, resources, and tools required for production.
2. Profit motivation – the primary goal of economic activity in capitalism is to generate profit for the owners.
3. Market competition – enterprises compete in relatively free markets where prices and production are determined by supply and demand.
4. Labor as a commodity – workers sell their labor to capitalists and are paid wages, which are generally less than the value of the goods and services they produce.
5. Decentralized decision-making – economic decisions are made by individual owners and consumers based on market signals rather than centralized planning.

Predictions on post-capitalism

1. End of traditional capitalism – Burnham argues that traditional capitalism, characterized by private ownership and control by owners, is being supplanted by a new form of economic organization where control rests with a managerial elite.
2. Rise of the managerial class – a new class of managers – administrators, bureaucrats, and executives – emerges as the primary controllers of economic resources, replacing the old capitalist class.
3. Technological and organizational changes – the complexity and scale of modern industry necessitate this shift, as advanced technologies and large-scale organizational structures require specialized management skills that traditional capitalists cannot provide.
4. Decline of property rights – the significance of private property rights diminishes in this new order, as the management of resources becomes more crucial than ownership.
5. Political implications – the managerial revolution leads to changes in government structure, favoring a more centralized and bureaucratized form that aligns with managerial needs.
6. Global perspective – Burnham views this shift as a global phenomenon, not confined to any single nation, affecting capitalist, fascist, and socialist states alike.
7. Future predictions – he predicts that the managerial societies will likely evolve into more authoritarian structures, as managerial elites consolidate power to manage economies and societies efficiently.

== Reception ==
The book has been influential in various fields, including political science and economics, and continues to be relevant in discussions about corporate governance and economic power dynamics. It was most famously reviewed by George Orwell in his essay "Second Thoughts on James Burnham", written in 1946. Orwell found the central premise of the book fascinating, but listed a range of criticisms, including problems with the practical war predictions of Burnham. Burnham's idea of an unaccountable managerial class gained traction among conservative intellectuals seeking to counteract the power of this class, viewing "woke" as the justifying ideology of the new class.

In June 1941, a hostile review of The Managerial Revolution by Socialist Workers Party loyalist Joseph Hansen in the SWP's theoretical magazine accused Burnham of surreptitiously lifting the central ideas of his book from the Italian Bruno Rizzi's La Bureaucratisation du Monde (1939). Despite certain similarities, there is no evidence Burnham knew of this book beyond Leon Trotsky's brief references to it in his debates with Burnham. Burnham was influenced by the idea of bureaucratic collectivism of the Trotskyist Yvan Craipeau, but Burnham took a distinct conservative Machiavellian rather than a Marxist viewpoint, an important philosophical difference which Burnham explored in greater detail in The Machiavellians. According to Vox, "Virtually all of The Managerial Revolution's major predictions—the coming collapse of capitalism, an Axis victory in World War II, the superior efficiency of state-run enterprises—were proven wrong. The power of the capitalist class has become more entrenched since the neoliberal revolution of the 1970s and '80s and attendant skyrocketing inequality. The rise of tech capitalism, with firms founded by individual innovators and technical experts, seems to disprove his theory that capitalists cannot themselves perform technical and management tasks at scale."

== See also ==
- Administrative state
- Managerial state
  - Managerialism
