= Second Thoughts on James Burnham =

1946 essay by George Orwell

"Second Thoughts on James Burnham" ("James Burnham and the Managerial Revolution", when published as a pamphlet) is an essay, first published in May 1946 in Polemic, by the English author George Orwell. The essay discusses works written by James Burnham, an American political theorist.

In the essay Orwell accepts that the general drift has 'almost certainly been towards oligarchy' and 'an increasing concentration of industrial and financial power' but criticises the tendency of Burnham's 'power-worship' and comments upon the failures in analysis that arise from it. Orwell biographer Michael Shelden: "Orwell was always at his best when he was on the attack, and his Polemic essay on Burnham is a brilliant criticism of the whole concept of power worship."

== Background ==
James Burnham (1905–1987), a former Trotskyist and professor of philosophy, rejected dialectical materialism in favour of logical empiricism in 1940. In 1941 he published The Managerial Revolution. In this work, Burnham offered theories about the new form of society which was emerging to replace capitalism, based upon his observations of capitalism's development in the interwar period. He saw much in common between the economic formations of Nazi Germany, Stalinist Russia, and the United States under Franklin D. Roosevelt and his "New Deal". Burnham perceived that a new society had emerged in which a ruling class of "managers" had assumed all power and privilege. In a 1943 book, The Machiavellians, Burnham developed his theory, arguing that the emerging new élite will have to retain some democratic trappings—political opposition, a free press, and a controlled "circulation of the elites".

Orwell's article appeared as "Second Thoughts on James Burnham" in Polemic No 3 in May 1946 and in various essay-collections, as "James Burnham and the Managerial Revolution" in a pamphlet printed by the Socialist Book Centre in summer 1946, and as "James Burnham" in the summer 1947 issue of University Observer of Chicago.

Orwell discussed Burnham's work again in a further essay: "Burnham's View of the Contemporary World Struggle", published in 1947.

== Summary ==
Orwell summarises Burnham's ideas in The Managerial Revolution and The Machiavellians and highlights inconsistencies. He believed Burnham was fascinated by power and was sympathetic to Nazi Germany while they appeared to be winning, but by 1944 had transferred his sympathy to the USSR. He noted, however, that the theme of a new (and probably servile) society—neither capitalist nor socialist—was predicted in many works such as Belloc's The Servile State, and dystopian novels such as Wells' The Sleeper Awakes, Zamyatin's We and Huxley's Brave New World.

Orwell considers that Burnham differs from most other thinkers in trying to plot the course of future developments, and with the benefit of hindsight he identifies Burnham's completely erroneous prophecies in 1940 and 1941 which were

1. Germany is bound to win the war
2. Germany and Japan are bound to survive as great states and to remain the nuclei of power in their respective areas
3. Germany will not attack the USSR until after the defeat of Britain
4. The USSR is bound to be defeated

Orwell then quotes an essay by Burnham entitled "Lenin's Heir" which posits a continuity between Lenin and Stalin's policies and appears to pay homage to Stalin "a great man". Again Burnham makes wrong predictions. Orwell identifies the reason for such errors to be the expectation that events will follow the course on which they appear to be set. This, argues Orwell, is a consequence of the worship of power and to some extent of wishful thinking. Orwell also notes that Burnham adopts the general American position of accepting both Communism and Fascism while classifying them as much the same thing. Whereas Englishmen, if they believe they are the same thing, see them as monstrous evils and if not, they take sides.

Orwell concludes that Burnham may be right in identifying a general drift towards oligarchy with the concentration of industrial and financial power, and the development of the managerial/technical class. However his error is in seeing this trend as continuing, and he makes two erroneous assumptions:

1. Politics is essentially the same in all ages
2. Political behaviour is different from other kinds of behaviour.

Orwell refutes these assumptions and notes that just as Nazism had smashed itself to pieces, so the Russian regime will destroy itself. "The huge, invincible, everlasting slave empire of which Burnham appears to dream will not be established, or if established, will not endure."

== Reactions ==
According to Christopher Hitchens, "Orwell was one of the very few commentators to see the sinister influence of [Burnham's] preachings, and subject these to a critique which greatly nettled Burnham himself."

Michael Shelden saw Burnham's work and Orwell's analysis as having an influence on his novel Nineteen Eighty-Four.

Robert Conquest saw the article as one of the first predictions that the Soviet Union would collapse if it could not successfully liberalise itself.

== Extracts ==
James Burnham’s book, The Managerial Revolution, made a considerable stir both in the United States and in this country at the time when it was published, and its main thesis has been so much discussed that a detailed exposition of it is hardly necessary. As shortly as I can summarize it, the thesis is this:-

Capitalism is disappearing, but Socialism is not replacing it. What is now arising is a new kind of planned, centralized society which will be neither capitalist nor, in any accepted sense of the word, democratic. The rulers of this new society will be the people who effectively control the means of production: that is, business executives, technicians, bureaucrats and soldiers, lumped together by Burnham under the name of ‘managers’. These people will eliminate the old capitalist class, crush the working class, and so organize society that all power and economic privilege remain in their own hands. Private property rights will be abolished, but common ownership will not be established. The new ‘managerial’ societies will not consist of a patchwork of small, independent states, but of great super-states grouped round the main industrial centres in Europe, Asia, and America. These super-states will fight among themselves for possession of the remaining uncaptured portions of the earth, but will probably be unable to conquer one another completely. Internally, each society will be hierarchical, with an aristocracy of talent at the top and a mass of semi-slaves at the bottom.

== See also ==
- Bibliography of George Orwell
