= Procedural democracy =

Type of governing system centering voting

Procedural democracy or proceduralist democracy, proceduralism or hollow democracy is a term used to denote the particular procedures, such as regular elections based on universal suffrage, that produce an electorally-legitimated government. Procedural democracy, with its centering of electoral processes as the basis of democratic legitimacy, is often contrasted with substantive or participatory democracy, which centers the equal participation of all groups in society in the political process as the basis of legitimacy.

The term is often used to denote an artificial appearance of democracy through the existence of democratic procedures like elections when in reality power is held by a small group of elites who manipulate democratic processes to make themselves appear democratically legitimate.

== See also ==
- Bureaucratic drift
  - Red tape
- Illiberal democracy
- Managerial state
  - Managerialism
- Substantive democracy
  - Democratic deficit
