= Professional–managerial class =

Proposed social class within capitalism

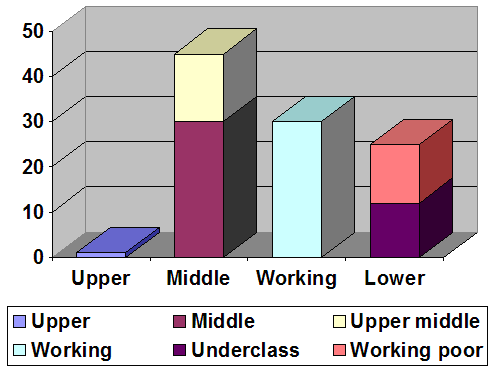
A bar plot of the Gilbert model, with the professional-managerial class being part of the upper middle class.

The professional-managerial class (PMC) is a social class within capitalism that, by controlling production processes through occupying a superior management position, is neither proletarian nor bourgeoisie. Conceived as "The New Class" by social scientists and critics such as Daniel Patrick Moynihan in the 1970s, this group of middle class professionals is distinguished from other social classes by their training and education, typically business qualifications and university degrees, with occupations thought to offer influence on society that would otherwise be available only to capital owners. The professional-managerial class tend to have incomes above the average for their country, with major exceptions being academia and print journalism.

== History ==
James Burnham had proposed the idea of a leading managerial class in his 1941 book The Managerial Revolution, but the term "professional-managerial class" was coined in 1977 by John and Barbara Ehrenreich. The PMC hypothesis contributed to the Marxist debates on class in Fordism and was used as an analytical category in the examination of non-proletarian employees. However, orthodox Marxists consider the PMC hypothesis to be revisionism of the Marxist understanding of class.

The Ehrenreichs defined the PMC as educated professionals who historically did not work in corporate environments, such as doctors, scientists, lawyers, academics, artists, and journalists. In a 2013 follow-up, they estimated that in the 1930s, PMC occupations made up less than 1% of total U.S. employment, but the share had risen to 24% by 1972, and 35% by 2006. In that same essay, they argued that the notion of the PMC as a collective grouping was "in ruins" due to economic shifts in the 1990s and 2000s which changed their professional prospects. Some members (such as highly qualified scientists) "jump[ed] ship for more lucrative posts in direct services to capital"; others (such as lawyers, tenured professors, and doctors) found themselves in increasingly "corporation-like" workplaces; while others still (like those with backgrounds in media or the humanities) "spiral[ed] down to the retail workforce", unable to parlay their skills into higher-income jobs.

=== Later use ===
By the late 2010s, the term was more broadly used in American political discourse as a shorthand reference to technocratic liberals or wealthy Democratic voters. Among left-wing commentators, it is typically used as a pejorative description; in 2019, Barbara Ehrenreich expressed disapproval over using the term as an "ultraleft slur". Catherine Liu, in Virtue Hoarders (2021), characterized the PMC as white-collar left liberals afflicted with a superiority complex in relation to ordinary members of the working class. Hans Magnus Enzensberger had previously written of the "characterless opportunism" of its members, in reference to its constant shifting of allegiances, not only between the leisured and working classes but also among themselves.

== See also ==
- Bildungsbürgertum
- Creative class
- Elite overproduction
- Labor aristocracy
- Lumpenbourgeoisie
- Managerial state
- New class
- Petite bourgeoisie
- Thought leader
- Upper middle class
