= The Machiavellians =

1943 book by James Burnham

- Title page for The Machiavellians: Defenders of Freedom (1943)
- Author: James Burnham
- Language: English
- Publisher: John Day Company
- Publication date: 1943
- Publication place: United States
- Pages: 270

The Machiavellians: Defenders of Freedom is a 1943 book by the American writer James Burnham.

== Summary ==
The book evokes theorists of elites and power structures, notably Dante Alighieri and Niccolò Machiavelli in the Renaissance period, and Gaetano Mosca, Robert Michels and Vilfredo Pareto in the 20th century. Using their theories, Burnham assesses the contemporary elites of the United States. He concludes that they have become weak, inflexible and bound to American liberalism in ways that erode liberty.

== Reception ==
Kirkus Reviews called the book stimulating and provocative, but wrote that "those who would profit most probably won't read it".
