= James Burnham =

American philosopher (1905–1987)

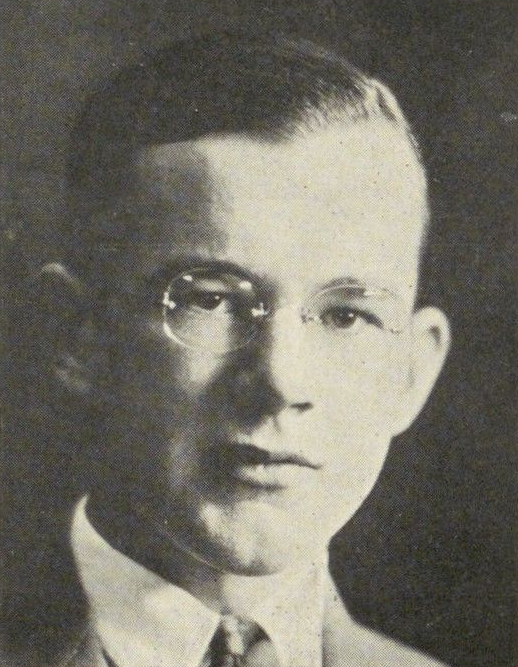
- Burnham in the Princeton University yearbook, 1927
- Born: November 22, 1905; Chicago, Illinois, U.S.
- Died: July 28, 1987 (aged 81); Kent, Connecticut, U.S.
- Burial place: Congregational Church Cemetery, Kent, Litchfield County, Connecticut, USA
- Spouse: Marcia Lightner (m. 1934)
- Relatives: David Burnham (brother)

Academic background
- Education: Princeton University; Balliol College, Oxford
- Influences: Machiavelli; Sorel; Pareto; Mosca; Michels; Marx; Trotsky

Academic work
- Discipline: Philosophy
- Sub-discipline: Political philosophy
- School or tradition: Trotskyism (early); American conservatism (late)
- Institutions: New York University
- Notable students: Maurice Natanson
- Notable works: The Managerial Revolution (1941); The Machiavellians: Defenders of Freedom (1943); Suicide of The West (1964)
- Notable ideas: Managerial class Managerial state
- Influenced: Orwell; Francis; Macdonald; Rahv; Gottfried; Moldbug

James Burnham (November 22, 1905 – July 28, 1987) was an American philosopher and political theorist. He chaired the New York University Department of Philosophy. Burnham was an editor and a regular contributor to William F. Buckley's conservative magazine National Review on a variety of topics. He rejected containment of the Soviet Union and called for the rollback of communism worldwide.

His first book was An Introduction to Philosophical Analysis (1931). Burnham became a prominent Trotskyist activist in the 1930s. His most famous book, The Managerial Revolution (1941), speculated on the future of an increasingly proceduralist hence sclerotic society. A year before he wrote the book, he rejected Marxism and became an influential theorist of the political right as a leader of the American conservative movement.

== Biography ==
=== Early life ===
Born in Chicago, Illinois, on November 22, 1905, James Burnham was the son of Claude George Burnham, an English immigrant and executive with the Burlington Railroad. James was raised as a Roman Catholic but rejected Catholicism as a college student, professing atheism for the rest of his life before reverting to the faith of his youth on his deathbed. He graduated at the top of his class at Princeton University before attending Balliol College, Oxford, where his professors included J. R. R. Tolkien and Martin D'Arcy. In 1929, he became a professor of philosophy at New York University. In 1934, he married Marcia Lightner.

=== Trotskyism ===
In 1933, along with Sidney Hook, Burnham helped to organize the American Workers Party led by the Dutch-born pacifist minister A. J. Muste. Burnham supported the 1934 merger with the Communist League of America which formed the US Workers Party. In 1935, he allied with the Trotskyist wing of that party and favored fusion with the Socialist Party of America. During this period, he became a friend to Leon Trotsky. Writing for Partisan Review, Burnham was also an important influence on writers including Dwight Macdonald and Philip Rahv.

Burnham's engagement with Trotskyism was short-lived, and from 1937 a number of disagreements came to the fore. In 1937, the Trotskyists were expelled from the Socialist Party, an action which led to the formation of the Socialist Workers Party (SWP) at the end of the year. Inside the SWP, Burnham allied with Max Shachtman in a faction fight over the position of the SWP's majority faction, led by James P. Cannon and backed by Leon Trotsky, defending the Soviet Union as a degenerated workers state against the incursions of imperialism. Shachtman and Burnham, especially after witnessing the Nazi–Soviet pact of 1939 and the invasions of Poland, Latvia, Lithuania, and Estonia by Joseph Stalin's regime, as well as the Soviet invasion of Finland in November 1939, came to contend that the USSR was a new form of imperialistic class society and was thus not worthy of even critical support from the socialist movement. In February 1940, Burnham wrote Science and Style: A Reply to Comrade Trotsky, in which he broke with dialectical materialism. In this text he responds to Trotsky's request to draw his attention to "those works which should supplant the system of dialectic materialism for the proletariat" by referring to Principia Mathematica by Russell and Whitehead and "the scientists, mathematicians and logicians now cooperating in the new Encyclopedia of Unified Science".

After a protracted discussion inside the SWP, in which the factions argued their case in a series of heated internal discussion bulletins, the special 3rd National Convention of the organization in early April 1940 decided the question in favor of the Cannon majority by a vote of 55–31. Even though the majority sought to avoid a split by offering to continue the debate and to allow proportional representation of the minority on the party's governing National Committee, Shachtman, Burnham, and their supporters resigned from the SWP to launch their own organization, again called the Workers Party. This break also marked the end of Burnham's participation in the radical movement, however. On May 21, 1940, he addressed a letter to the National Committee of the Workers Party resigning from the organization. In it he made it clear the distance he had moved away from Marxism:

I reject, as you know, the "philosophy of Marxism," dialectical materialism. ...

The general Marxian theory of "universal history", to the extent that it has any empirical content, seems to me disproved by modern historical and anthropological investigation.

Marxian economics seems to me for the most part either false or obsolete or meaningless in application to contemporary economic phenomena. Those aspects of Marxian economics which retain validity do not seem to me to justify the theoretical structure of the economics.

Not only do I believe it meaningless to say that "socialism is inevitable" and false that socialism is "the only alternative to capitalism"; I consider that on the basis of the evidence now available to us a new form of exploitive society (which I call "managerial society") is not only possible but is a more probable outcome of the present than socialism. ...

On no ideological, theoretic or political ground, then, can I recognize, or do I feel, any bond or allegiance to the Workers Party (or to any other Marxist party). That is simply the case, and I can no longer pretend about it, either to myself or to others.

In 1941, Burnham wrote a book analyzing the development of economics and society as he saw it, called The Managerial Revolution: What is Happening in the World. The book was included in Life magazine's list of the 100 outstanding books of 1924–1944.

=== OSS and National Review ===
During World War II, Burnham took a leave from NYU to work for the Office of Strategic Services (OSS), a forerunner of the Central Intelligence Agency. Recommended by George F. Kennan, Burnham was invited to lead the semi-autonomous "Political and Psychological Warfare" division of the Office of Policy Coordination. Subsequently, he called for an aggressive strategy against the Soviet Union during the Cold War. A contributor to The Freeman in the early 1950s, he considered the magazine too focused on economic issues, though it presented a wide range of opinion on the Soviet threat. In The Struggle for the World (1947), he called for common citizenship between the United States, Great Britain, and the British dominions, as well as a "World Federation" against communism. Burnham thought in terms of a hegemonic world, instead of a balance of power:

A World Federation initiated and led by the United States would be, we have recognized, a World Empire. In this imperial federation, the United States, with a monopoly of atomic weapons, would hold a preponderance of decisive material power over all the rest of the world. In world politics, that is to say, there would not be a balance of power.

In 1955, Burnham helped William F. Buckley Jr. found National Review magazine, which from the start took positions in foreign policy consistent with Burnham's own. In the National Review, he wrote a column titled "Third World War", which referred to the Cold War. Burnham became a lifelong contributor to the journal, and Buckley referred to him as "the number one intellectual influence on National Review since the day of its founding". His approach to foreign policy caused some to regard him as the first "neoconservative", and Burnham's ideas also were an important influence on both neoconservative and paleoconservative factions of the American Right. In 1983, President Ronald Reagan awarded him the Presidential Medal of Freedom. In early November 1978 he suffered a stroke which affected his health and short-term memory. He died of kidney and liver cancer at home in Kent, Connecticut, on July 28, 1987. He was buried in Kent on August 1, 1987.

== Ideas ==
=== The Managerial Revolution ===
Dust jacket of the 1941 edition of Burnham's seminal work

Burnham's seminal work, The Managerial Revolution (1941), theorized about the future of world capitalism based upon its development in the interwar period. Burnham begins by saying, "It is a historical law, with no apparent exceptions so far known, that all social and economic groups of any size strive to improve their relative position with respect to power and privilege in society", and then weighs three possibilities:

1. Capitalism is a permanent form of social and economic organization and would continue indefinitely.
2. It is temporary and destined by its nature to collapse and be replaced by socialism.
3. It is currently being transformed into some non-socialist future form of society.

Since capitalism had a more-or-less definite beginning in the 14th century, it could not be regarded as an immutable and permanent form. Moreover, in the last years of previous economic systems such as those of Ancient Greece and the Roman Empire, mass unemployment was "a symptom that a given type of social organization is just about finished". The worldwide mass-unemployment of the Great Depression era thus indicated that capitalism was itself "not going to continue much longer".

Burnham agreed with Marxists that the capitalist class would inevitably lose the class struggle, but disagreed that they would lose to the working class due to this class being too disorganized and weak. He instead argued that a new class – the managerial class – would win against the capitalist class. Burnham sees this new class as the individuals engaged in "the tasks of the technical direction and coordination of the process of production". The managerial class includes "operating executives, superintendents, administrative engineers, supervisory technicians; or, in government ... administrators, commissioners, bureau heads, and so on".

According to Burnham, the managerial class has risen due to the increasing complexity and large scope of modern economies. Because doing certain tasks requires hyper specific technical knowledge, the capitalist class cannot perform all of the necessary tasks by themselves. This means that the capitalist class has to employ individuals who manage other individuals engaged in technical work. By doing this, the capitalist class has made themselves obsolete, since the managers are the individuals who actually control production. Although the managerial class is still employed by the capitalist class, Burnham argued that this arrangement was irreconcilable. This would eventually result in the managerial class who actually owns production seizing it from the capitalist class who owns it in name only. According to Burnham, the managerial class would seize power by implementing state ownership of production. Due to the complexity and large scale of modern economies, Burnham argues that this form of state ownership would prove more efficient than rule by individual capitalists. According to Burnham, the "managerial revolution" would result in the decline of capitalist democracy and the rise of managerial control of production while using "the unlimited state" as a vehicle.

Analyzing the emerging forms of society around the world, Burnham saw certain commonalities between the economic formations of Nazi Germany, Stalinist Russia, and the United States under Franklin D. Roosevelt with the New Deal. Burnham argued that in the short period since the First World War, a new society had emerged in which a social group or class of "managers" had waged a "drive for social dominance, for power and privilege, for the position of ruling class." For at least the previous decade, there had grown in America the idea of a "separation of ownership and control" of the modern corporation, notably expounded in The Modern Corporation and Private Property by Berle and Means. Burnham expanded this concept, arguing that whether ownership was corporate and private or statist and governmental, the essential demarcation between the ruling elite (executives and managers backed by bureaucrats and functionaries) and the mass of society was not ownership so much as control of the means of production. Burnham emphasized that "New Dealism", as he called it, "is not, let me repeat, a developed, systematized managerial ideology". Still, this ideology had contributed to American capitalism's moving in a "managerial direction", stating:

In its own more confused, less advanced way, New Dealism too has spread abroad the stress on the state as against the individual, planning as against private enterprise, jobs (even if relief jobs) against opportunities, security against initiative, "human rights" against "property rights." There can be no doubt that the psychological effect of New Dealism has been what the capitalists say it has been: to undermine public confidence in capitalist ideas and rights and institutions. Its most distinctive features help to prepare the minds of the masses for the acceptance of the managerial social structure.

Burnham argued that the power of the capitalist class would decline, while a new managerial class would rise to take its place, directing the state and industry. He described both Nazi Germany and the Soviet Union as having a managerial class based on an economic model he considered to be superior to liberal capitalism. Because of this, he incorrectly predicted that the Nazis would win World War II.

=== Later writings ===
In The Machiavellians (1943), Burnham developed his theory that the emerging new élite would prosper better if it retained some democratic trappings—political opposition, a free press, and a controlled "circulation of the élites." His 1964 book Suicide of the West became a classic text for the post-war conservative movement in American politics, proclaiming Burnham's new interest in traditional moral values, classical liberal economics, and anti-communism. He saw political ideologies as potential syndromes (sets of elements) afflicting their proponents with various internal contradictions. His works greatly influenced paleoconservative author Sam Francis (1947–2005), who wrote two books about Burnham and based his own political theories upon the "managerial revolution" and the resulting managerial state.

== Reception ==
=== Comments and Adaptation by George Orwell ===
While critical of Burnham's predictions - that Germany is bound to win the war; Germany and Japan are bound to survive as great states and to remain the nuclei of power in their respective areas; Germany will not attack the USSR until after the defeat of Britain; and the USSR is bound to be defeated - British writer George Orwell was inspired by Burnham's The Managerial Revolution and his explanation of power, which informed Orwell's 1949 novel Nineteen Eighty-Four. Orwell noted in 1945, "For Burnham's geographical picture of the new world has turned out to be correct. More and more obviously the surface of the earth is being parcelled off into three great empires ..." The superpowers of Oceania, Eurasia, and Eastasia in the novel are partly influenced by Burnham's assessment of the United States under Franklin D. Roosevelt, Nazi Germany, and the Soviet Union as being managerial states. In 1946 Orwell, summarized Burnham's managerial revolution and outlined the geopolitical landscape of Nineteen Eighty-Four:

The rulers of this new society will be the people who effectively control the means of production: that is, business executives, technicians, bureaucrats and soldiers, lumped together by Burnham, under the name of 'managers'. These people will eliminate the old capitalist class, crush the working class, and so organise society that all power and economic privilege remain in their own hands. Private property rights will be abolished, but common ownership will not be established. The new 'managerial' societies will not consist of a patchwork of small, independent states, but of great super-states grouped round the main industrial centres in Europe, Asia, and America. These super-states will fight among themselves for possession of the remaining uncaptured portions of the earth, but will probably be unable to conquer one another completely. Internally, each society will be hierarchical, with an aristocracy of talent at the top and a mass of semi-slaves at the bottom."

While Orwell partly agreed with Burnham's analysis, he never fully accepted Burnham's attitude towards Machiavellian managerial power, and Nineteen Eighty-Four has been seen as a satire of Burnham's analysis. This unresolved thought helped to inspire the character of O'Brien, who talks about power and regimes in Nineteen Eighty-Four.

=== Influence on Neo-Conservatism and the Alt-Right ===
A book on The New Right or alt-right by Michael Malice published shortly after Trump’s election positions Burnham as a seminal thinker for both neo-conservatism and a more recent manifestation built up from his thinking, alt-right, by following after and popularizing Pareto (a mentor to Mussolini whose writings provided the core inspiration for Burnham’s work on the managerial revolution), and calling for a return to a more Machiavellian style of political thought in policy-making. Malice describes how many of the Trotskyists of the 1930’s were eventually converted to neo-conservatism after encounters with Burnham’s work.

== Works ==
Books

- Introduction to Philosophical Analysis (with Philip Wheelwright). New York: Henry Holt and Company, 1932.
- The Managerial Revolution: What is Happening in the World. New York: John Day Co., 1941.
- The Machiavellians: Defenders of Freedom. New York: John Day Co., 1943. ISBN 0-89526785-3.
- The Struggle for the World. New York: John Day Co., 1947.
- The Case for De Gaulle: A Dialogue Between André Malraux and James Burnham. New York: Random House, 1948.
- The Coming Defeat of Communism. New York: John Day Co., 1949.
- Containment or Liberation? An Inquiry into the Aims of United States Foreign Policy. New York: John Day Co., 1953.
- The Web of Subversion: Underground Networks. New York: John Day Co., 1954.
- Congress and the American Tradition. Chicago: Regnery, 1959. ISBN 0-76580997-4.
- Bear and Dragon: What is the Relation Between Moscow and Peking? New York: National Review, in cooperation with the American-Asian Exchange, 1960.
- Suicide of the West: An Essay on the Meaning and Destiny of Liberalism. New York: John Day Co., 1964.
- The War We Are In: The Last Decade and the Next. New Rochelle, NY: Arlington House, 1967.

Book contributions

- Introduction. In: Evans, Medford Bryan The Secret War for the A-Bomb. Washington: Regnery Publishing, 1953.
- Introduction. In: Dobriansky, Lev E. Veblenism: A New Critique. Washington: Public Affairs Press, 1957.

Pamphlets

- War and the Workers (as John West). New York: Workers Party of the United States, 1935. Marxists.
- Why Did They "Confess"? A Study of the Radek-Piatakov Trial. New York: Pioneer Publishers, 1937. Marxists.
- The People's Front: The New Betrayal. New York: Pioneer Publishers, 1937. Bolshevik.
- How to Fight War: Isolation, Collective Security, Relentless Class Struggle? New York: Socialist Workers Party & Young Peoples Socialist League (4th Internationalists), 1938.
- Let the People Vote on War! New York: Pioneer Publishers, 1939?.
- In Defense of Marxism (Against the Petty-Bourgeois Opposition) (with Leon Trotsky, Joseph Hansen and William Warde). New York: Pioneer Publishers, 1942.

Public speaking

- Why Does a Country Go Communist? An address delivered at the Indian Congress for Cultural Freedom on March 31, 1951. Bombay: Democratic Research Service, 1951.

Selected articles

- "Lenin’s Heir" Partisan Review, Vol.12, No.1 1945.
- "The Case Against Adlai Stevenson." American Mercury, Vol. 76, October 1952, pp. 11–19.
- "Can Washington Conduct Political Warfare?" American Mercury, December 1952, pp. 10–24.
- "Does ADA Run the New Frontier?" National Review, Vol. 14, No. 18, May 7, 1963, pp. 355–62.

== See also ==
- Circulation of elites
- Sam Francis
- Paul Gottfried

== Sources ==
- Diggins, John P. (1975), Up From Communism, New York: Columbia University Press – via The Internet archive
