= Beach Health Clinic =

Health clinic in Virginia Beach, US

Coordinates: 36°48′20.9″N 76°5′23″W

Beach Health Clinic is a volunteer staffed, private, non-profit clinic established in 1986 by a group of concerned physicians. The mission of the clinic is to provide basic medical services and prescription assistance to the uninsured, working poor families of Virginia Beach.

== Volunteer staff ==
Beach Health Clinic is staffed by doctors, nurse practitioners, nurses, medical technicians and lay people who generously volunteer their time and talents to provide basic medical care to the uninsured working poor families of Virginia Beach. The availability of services may vary depending on the resources available.

== Funding ==
Funding for Beach Health Clinic comes from individual donations, United Way designations and grants. Because more than 200 doctors, nurses and lay people donate their time and some donate samples and supplies, the clinic is able to provide $9 in free medical care and prescription medications for every $1 spent. Last year the clinic provided more than $3.45 million in free care to 11,000 sick children and adults

== Eligibility ==
To be considered or remain a patient at the Beach Health Clinic, a person must be able to document residency and proof of household income.
