= Maximum wage =

Wage control law

A maximum wage, also often called a wage ceiling, is a legal limit on how much income an individual can earn. It is a prescribed limitation which can be used to effect change in an economic structure.

== Implementation ==
No major economy has a direct earnings limit, though some economies do incorporate the policy of highly progressive tax structures in the form of scaled taxation.

A vote to implement a maximum wage law in Switzerland failed with only a 34.7% vote for approval.

=== Maximum liquid wealth ===
A maximum liquid wealth policy restricts the amount of liquid wealth an individual is permitted to maintain, while giving them unrestricted access to non-liquid assets. That is to say, an individual may earn as much as they like during a given time period, but all earnings must be re-invested (spent) within an equivalent time period; all earnings not re-invested within this time period would be seized.

This policy is only arguably a valid maximum wage implementation, as it does not actually restrict the wages a person is allowed to maintain, but only restricts the amount of actual currency they are allowed to hold at any given time. Proponents of the policy argue that it enforces the ideals of a maximum wage without restricting actual capital growth or economic incentive.

Proponents believe wealth that is not re-invested in the economy is harmful to economic growth; that actual liquid currency not re-invested timely is indicative of an unfair trade, in which an individual has paid more for a good/service than the good/service was worth. This stems from the belief that currency should represent the actual value of a good or service.

When this policy is imposed, individual savings can only be held as solid assets like stocks, bonds, business, and property. Opponents argue that since a maximum liquid wealth policy makes no allowance for individual savings, it therefore assumes the non-importance of a bank and the loans that banks provide. Loans being essential to the economy, opponents argue, banks are an essential economic institution. Proponents of the maximum liquid wealth policy respond that government could be directly responsible for supplying loans to individuals; they also add that such an arrangement could result in vastly lower interest rates.

=== Relative earnings limit ===
A relative earnings limit is a limit imposed upon a business, to the amount of compensation an individual is allowed, as a specific multiple of a company's lowest earner; or directly relative to the number of individuals a company employs and the average compensation provided to each individual employee, not including a certain percentage of the company's top earners. The former implementation has the advantage of limiting wage gaps. The latter implementation has the advantage of encouraging employment opportunities, as increasing employment would be a way for employers to boost their maximum earnings. A compromise would be to base the limit upon the number of employees had by a specific company and the compensation of that company's lowest earner.

A weakness in this method is that a company can simply hire outside firms to keep low wage employees off their payroll, while only having the top earning employees on the company's payroll, effectively bypassing the limits. However, the hiring of external employees will come at a higher total cost and will reduce company profits, something against which executives are often measured and compensated.

To moderate self-employed individuals, the maximum could be based on the average compensation of the nation's employed (GDP per capita) and a specific multiplier. As the number of self-employed individuals with no employees and who earn an excessive amount of money would be extremely limited, such a measure is unlikely to be implemented.

=== Direct earnings limit ===
A direct earnings limit is a limit placed directly, usually as a number in terms of currency, upon the amount of compensation any individual is allowed to earn in a given time period.

=== Scaled taxation ===
Scaled taxation is a method of progressive taxation that raises the rate at which the principal sum is taxed, directly relative to the amount of the principal. This type of taxation is normally applied to income taxes, although other types of taxation can be scaled.

In the case of a maximum wage, a scaled tax would be applied so that the top earners in a society would be taxed extremely large percentages of their income. Modern income tax systems, allowing salary raises to be reflected by a raise in after tax income, tax each individual note of currency in each particular bracket at the same rate. An example follows.

Example Calculated amounts shown for top of bracket. Any currency may be substituted for dollars.
Tax bracket	Width of bracket	Marginal tax rate	Tax paid on bracket	Accumulated after-tax income	Effective tax rate (rounded)
Nil – $40,000	$40,000	15.00%	$6,000	$34,000	15.00%
$40,000 – $100,000	$60,000	35.00%	$21,000	$73,000	27.00%
$100,000 – $175,000	$75,000	50.00%	$37,500	$110,500	36.86%
$175,000 – $250,000	$75,000	60.00%	$45,000	$140,500	43.80%
$250,000 – $500,000	$250,000	75.00%	$187,500	$203,000	59.40%
Above $500,000	—	90.00%	—	—	Over 59.40%

== History ==
In 1350, positions in the Church were in high demand due to deaths from the Black Plague eradicating the clergy. The Archbishop of Canterbury at the time, Simon Islip, issued a letter condemning "priests [that] care more for money than for the safety of their soul", stating that priests were forgoing their duty to the poor in order to serve the rich in private chapels. Islip instituted a maximum annual wage for priests as well as a fine for the 'giver' and 'receiver' of those caught offering private tithes above the maximum.

In England, the Statute of Labourers 1351 prohibited anyone of working age who did not have enough land to support themselves from demanding, or employers from offering, wages higher than were typical for those of their station in 1346, and required them to work on pain of fines, during an economic depression caused by the Hundred Years' War. It was a major cause of the Peasants' Revolt in 1381. Later, the Statute of Artificers 1563 implemented statutes of compulsory labor and fixed maximum wage scales; Justices of the Peace could fix wages according "to the plenty or scarcity of the time".

To counteract the increase in prevailing wages due to scarcity of labor, American colonies in the 17th century created a ceiling wage and minimum hours of employment.

In the early Soviet Union, in the period 1920–1932, Communist Party members were subject to a maximum wage, the partmaximum. Its demise is seen as the onset of the rise of the nomenklatura class of Soviet apparatchiks. The idea that any individual could earn money by their labor, instead of earning for the community, undermined the initial principles of communism.

In 1933, Washington State Representative Wesley Lloyd proposed an amendment to the U.S. Constitution that would have limited annual incomes to $1 million (equivalent to $25 million in 2025). His contemporary colleague John Snyder introduced a companion amendment that would have limited personal wealth to $1 million. Neither proposed amendment, however, received enough votes to begin the ratification process.

In 1942, during World War II, US President Franklin D. Roosevelt proposed a maximum income of $25,000 (equivalent to $492,617 in 2025) during the war:

At the same time, while the number of individual Americans affected is small, discrepancies between low personal incomes and very high personal incomes should be lessened; and I therefore believe that in time of this grave national danger, when all excess income should go to win the war, no American citizen ought to have a net income, after he has paid his taxes, of more than $25,000 a year. It is indefensible that those who enjoy large incomes from State and local securities should be immune from taxation while we are at war. Interest on such securities should be subject at least to surtaxes.

— Message to Congress on an Economic Stabilization Program, April 27, 1942

This was proposed to be implemented by a 100% marginal tax on all income over $40,000 (after-tax income of $25,000). While this was not implemented, the Revenue Act of 1942 implemented an 88% marginal tax rate on income over $200,000, together with a 5% "Victory Tax" with post-war credits, hence temporarily yielding a 93% top tax rate (though 5% was subsequently returned in credits).

After decades of social democratic governments, the Swedish children's author Astrid Lindgren faced an infamous marginal tax rate of 102% in 1976, in effect creating a wage ceiling. Though the example was partly due to inverted loop holes in the tax code, the figure was seen as an important catalyst for the results in the election that year, in which the Social Democratic Party lost power after having led the country for 40 consecutive years. Later a "tax rebellion" demanded the top marginal tax rates were reduced to 50% in the late 1980s.

Since the 1990s, the chief proponent of a maximum wage in the United States has been Sam Pizzigati; see References, particularly (Pizzigati 2004).

In his 2000 run for the Green Party presidential nomination, Jello Biafra called for a maximum wage of $100,000 in the United States, and the reduction of the income tax to zero for all income below that level. Biafra claimed he would increase taxes for the wealthy and reduce taxes for those in the lower and middle classes. Many Green parties have a maximum wage in their manifesto, which they argue would prevent conspicuous consumption and the subsequent environmental damage that they believe ensues, while allowing the financing of jobs and a guaranteed minimum income for the poorest workers.

In his campaign for the French presidency in 2012, Jean-Luc Mélenchon argued in favour of a tax rate of 100% on incomes over €360,000.

=== Association football ===
In the United Kingdom until 1901, individual clubs had set their own wage policies. That year, the Football League ratified a maximum weekly wage for footballers of £4 (equivalent to £425 in 2025). This severely limited the ability of the best players in the country to forgo the need to take paid employment outside of football and, this in turn led to the formation of the Players' Union in 1907.

By the summer of 1928, players could earn a weekly maximum of £8 (equivalent to £435 in 2025), although clubs routinely found ways to increase this. Arsenal player Eddie Hapgood supplemented his income by fashion modelling and advertising chocolate.

== See also ==
- Family wage
- Gini coefficient
- Income inequality metrics
- Living wage
- Minimum wage
- One-dollar salary
- Partmaximum
- Salary cap
- Social welfare
- Wage dispersion
- Wage ratio
- Welfare economics
