= Vydvizhenets =

A promotee from a rank-and-file position in the Soviet Union

In the early history of the Soviet Union, a vydvizhenets (выдвиженец) was someone, especially an ordinary person (worker, peasant, rank-and-file engineer, etc.) promoted to a position of responsibility. Vydvizhentsy were the core of the forming Soviet nomenklatura, described as the New Class. Vydvizhentsy in this sense should be distinguished from people being appointed to various leadership positions for the virtue of being trusted Bolshevik Party members.

Later the term vydvizhenets was applied to persons promoted in ranks by higher leadership and may be translated by the term "protege", and in this meaning it was seen as an evidence of widespread clientelism within Soviet Communist Party elites. For example, Nikita Khrushchev is recognized as "Stalin's vydvizhenets", i.e., Stalin's promotee.

== Etymology ==
The word is a noun derived from the verb выдвигать, meaning "to promote" in this context and it is literally translated as "promotee".

== History ==
Diane P. Koenker describes three types of worker vdvishentsy.

== Cultural references ==
Russian satirists Ilf and Petrov had a novella "Vydvizhenets for an Hour" within the novel 1001 Day or New Scheherazade. . Novella's title is a pun with the Russian title "Caliph for an Hour" of a story from One Thousand and One Nights. (In English a similar expression for a temporary ruler is "King for a Day".)
