= Uchraspred =

1919–1924 Soviet Russian communist party departments

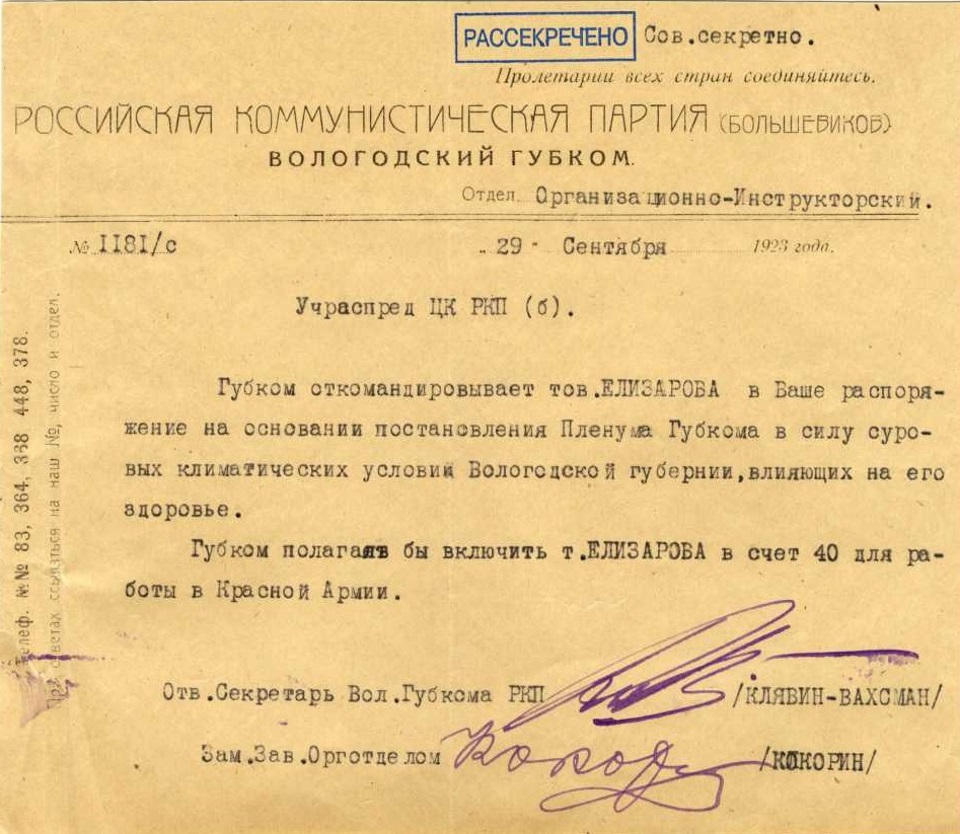
A letter placing a party member under the supervision of Uchraspred for further assignment

The Uchraspred (Russian: Учраспред, abbreviation for учетно-распределительный отдел, Registration and Distribution Department) was the name of the departments in various organizations in Soviet Russia responsible for registering Communist Party members in order to assign them to various managerial positions.

The uchraspred of the Central Committee of the Russian Communist Party was founded in April, 1919. However, the appointments to the highest party positions were under the jurisdiction of the Orgburo. In March 1924, the Communist Party Uchraspred was merged with the Организационно-инструкторский отдел ЦК РКП(б), forming the Orgraspred (Организационно-распределительный отдел ЦК РКП(б)).

== See also ==
- Apparatchik
- Cadre management in the Soviet Union
- Nomenklatura
