= Minimum wage =

Lowest remuneration which can be paid legally in a state for working

A minimum wage is the lowest remuneration that employers can legally pay their employees—the price floor below which employees may not sell their labor. Most countries had introduced minimum wage legislation by the end of the 20th century. Because minimum wages increase the cost of labor, companies often try to avoid minimum wage laws by using gig workers, by moving labor to locations with lower or nonexistent minimum wages, or by automating job functions. Minimum wage policies can vary significantly between countries or even within a country, with different regions, sectors, or age groups having their own minimum wage rates. These variations are often influenced by the cost of living, regional economic conditions, and industry-specific factors.

2025 minimum wages in the OECD, in U.S. dollars purchasing power parity
Country	Dollars per hour
Luxembourg	18
Germany	18
Australia	17
Netherlands	17
United Kingdom	17
Belgium	16
France	16
New Zealand	15
Spain	15
Ireland	15
Canada	13
Poland	13
Lithuania	12
Slovenia	12
South Korea	11
Japan	10
Portugal	10
Czech Republic	9
Israel	9
Turkey	8
Greece	8
Hungary	8
Slovakia	8
Estonia	8
Latvia	8
United States	7
Costa Rica	6
Chile	5
Colombia	4
Mexico	3

The movement for minimum wages was initially motivated by a desire to stop the exploitation of workers in sweatshops by employers who were thought to have unfair bargaining power over them. Over time, minimum wages came to be seen as a way to help lower-income families. Modern national laws enforcing compulsory union membership and prescribing minimum wages for members were first passed in New Zealand in 1894. Although minimum wage laws are now in effect in many jurisdictions, differences of opinion exist about the benefits and drawbacks of a minimum wage. Additionally, minimum wage policies can be implemented in various ways, such as directly legislating specific wage rates, setting a formula to adjust the minimum wage based on economic indicators, or establishing wage boards that determine minimum wages in consultation with representatives of employers, employees, and the government.

Because it acts as a price floor on labor, standard supply and demand models predict that minimum wages will lead to a surplus of labor (unemployment), particularly among low-skilled workers. However, they can increase labor market efficiency and employment in monopsony scenarios, where individual employers have some wage-setting power over the market as a whole. Supporters of the minimum wage say it increases the standard of living of workers, reduces poverty, reduces inequality, and boosts morale. In contrast, opponents of the minimum wage say it increases poverty and unemployment because some low-wage workers "will be unable to find work ... [and] will be pushed into the ranks of the unemployed".

== History ==
"It is a serious national evil that any class of his Majesty's subjects should receive less than a living wage in return for their utmost exertions. It was formerly supposed that the working of the laws of supply and demand would naturally regulate or eliminate that evil ... [and] ... ultimately produce a fair price. Where ... you have a powerful organisation on both sides ... there you have a healthy bargaining .... But where you have what we call sweated trades, you have no organisation, no parity of bargaining, the good employer is undercut by the bad, and the bad employer is undercut by the worst ... where those conditions prevail you have not a condition of progress, but a condition of progressive degeneration."

— Winston Churchill MP, Trade Boards Bill, Hansard House of Commons (28 April 1909) vol 4, col 388

Amongst the earliest minimum wages were introduced in Mesopotamia during the reign of Hammurabi, while in Ancient Egypt many workers received minimum wages in the form of rations. In addition, measures aimed at ensuring fair wages were carried out during the days of the Byzantine Empire and in early Islamic societies.

In medieval England, the Ordinance of Labourers (1349), a decree by King Edward III, set a maximum wage for laborers in medieval England. Edward, who was a wealthy landowner, was dependent, like his lords, on serfs to work the land. In the autumn of 1348, the Black Plague reached England and decimated the population. The severe shortage of labor caused wages to soar and encouraged King Edward III to set a wage ceiling. Subsequent amendments to the ordinance, such as the Statute of Labourers (1351), increased the penalties for paying a wage above the set rates.

While the laws governing wages initially set a ceiling on compensation, they were eventually used to set a living wage. An amendment to the Statute of Labourers in 1389 effectively fixed wages to the price of food. As time passed, the Justice of the Peace, who was charged with setting the maximum wage, also began to set formal minimum wages. The practice was eventually formalized with the passage of the Act Fixing a Minimum Wage in 1604 by King James I for workers in the textile industry.

By the early 19th century, the Statutes of Labourers were repealed as the increasingly capitalistic United Kingdom embraced laissez-faire policies that disfavored wage regulation (whether upper or lower limits). The subsequent 19th century saw significant labor unrest affect many industrial nations. As trade unions were decriminalized during the century, attempts to control wages through collective agreement were made.

It was not until the 1890s that the first modern legislative attempts to regulate minimum wages appeared in New Zealand and Australia. In 1896, the Australian state of Victoria introduced a Factory Act that established boards for setting minimum wages for people employed in industries known for sweating, such as meat, bread-making, furniture, and clothing. In Germany, a guaranteed minimum wage was introduced during the chancellorship of Leo von Caprivi. The movement for a minimum wage was initially focused on stopping sweatshop labor and curbing the proliferation of sweatshops in manufacturing industries. The sweatshops employed large numbers of women and young workers, paying them what were considered to be substandard wages. The sweatshop owners were thought to have unfair bargaining power over their employees, and a minimum wage was proposed to ensure fair pay. Over time, the focus changed to helping people, especially families, become more self-sufficient.

In the United States, the late 19th-century ideas for favoring a minimum wage also coincided with the eugenics movement. As a consequence, some economists at the time, including Royal Meeker and Henry Rogers Seager, argued for the adoption of a minimum wage not only to support the worker, but to support their desired semi- and skilled laborers while forcing the undesired workers (including the idle, immigrants, women, racial minorities, and the disabled) out of the labor market. The result, over the longer term, would be to limit the nondesired workers' ability to earn money and have families, and thereby, remove them from the economists' ideal society.

== Minimum wage laws ==
"It seems to me to be equally plain that no business which depends for existence on paying less than living wages to its workers has any right to continue in this country."

— President Franklin D. Roosevelt, 1933

The first modern national minimum wages were enacted by the government recognition of unions which in turn established minimum wage policy among their members, as in New Zealand in 1894, followed by Australia in 1896 and the United Kingdom in 1909. In the United States, statutory minimum wages were first introduced nationally in 1938, and they were reintroduced and expanded in the United Kingdom in 1998. There is now legislation or binding collective bargaining regarding minimum wage in more than 90 percent of all countries. In the European Union, 21 out of 27 member states currently have national minimum wages. Other countries, such as Sweden, Finland, Denmark, Switzerland, Austria, and Italy, have no minimum wage laws, but rely on employer groups and trade unions to set minimum earnings through collective bargaining.

Minimum wage rates vary greatly across many different jurisdictions, not only in setting a particular amount of money—for example $7.25 per hour ($14,500 per year) under certain US state laws (or $2.13 for employees who receive tips, which is known as the tipped minimum wage), $16.28 per hour in the U.S. state of Washington, or £11.44 (for those aged 21+) in the United Kingdom—but also in terms of which pay period (for example Russia and China set monthly minimum wages) or the scope of coverage. Currently, the United States federal minimum wage is $7.25 per hour, though most states have a higher minimum wage. However, some states do not have a minimum wage law, such as Louisiana and Tennessee, and others have minimum wages below the federal minimum, such as Georgia and Wyoming, although the federal minimum wage is enforced in those states. Some jurisdictions allow employers to count tips given to their workers as credit towards the minimum wage levels. India was one of the first developing countries to introduce minimum wage policy in its law in 1948. However, it is rarely implemented, even by contractors of government agencies. In Mumbai, as of 2017, the minimum wage was Rs. 348/day. India also has one of the most complicated systems with more than 1,200 minimum wage rates depending on the geographical region.

=== Informal minimum wages ===
Customs, tight labor markets, and extra-legal pressures from governments or labor unions can each produce a de facto minimum wage. So can international public opinion, by pressuring multinational companies to pay Third World workers wages usually found in more industrialized countries. The latter situation in Southeast Asia and Latin America was publicized in the 2000s, but it existed with companies in West Africa in the middle of the 20th century.

=== Setting minimum wage ===
Among the indicators that might be used to establish an initial minimum wage rate are ones that minimize the loss of jobs while preserving international competitiveness. Among these are general economic conditions as measured by real and nominal gross domestic product; inflation; labor supply and demand; wage levels, distribution and differentials; employment terms; productivity growth; labor costs; business operating costs; the number and trend of bankruptcies; economic freedom rankings; standards of living and the prevailing average wage rate.

In the business sector, concerns include the expected increased cost of doing business, threats to profitability, rising levels of unemployment (and subsequent higher government expenditure on welfare benefits, raising tax rates), and the possible knock-on effects to the wages of more experienced workers who might already be earning the new statutory minimum wage, or slightly more. Other concerns include purchasing power, inflation indexing and standardized working hours.

=== Impact of minimum wage on income inequality and poverty ===
Minimum wage policies have been debated for their impact on income inequality and poverty levels. Proponents argue that raising the minimum wage can help reduce income disparities, enabling low-income workers to afford necessities and contribute to the overall economy. Higher minimum wages may also have a ripple effect, pushing up wages for those earning slightly above the minimum wage.

However, opponents contend that minimum wage increases can lead to job losses, particularly for low-skilled and entry-level workers, as businesses may be unable to afford higher labor costs and may respond by cutting jobs or hours. They also argue that minimum wage increases may not effectively target those living in poverty, as many minimum wage earners are secondary earners in households with higher incomes. Some studies suggest that targeted income support programs, such as the Earned Income Tax Credit (EITC) in the United States, may be more effective in addressing poverty.

A 2025 National Bureau of Economic Research (NBER) working paper estimates a 2.7–3.6% relative decline in California's fast-food employment compared to the rest of the U.S. from September 2023 to September 2024 following an increase in the state's minimum wage from $16 to $20 per hour. The median estimate is about 18,000 jobs that would have existed without the policy.

Revised Bureau of Labor Statistics (BLS) data, analyzed in reports from Beacon Economics/Pepperdine (2025) and others, indicate job losses ranging from 10,000 to 23,000 in 2024, with California's sector declining by 3.2% while national fast-food employment grew slightly.

The effectiveness of minimum wage policies in reducing income inequality and poverty remains a subject of ongoing debate and research.

== Economic models ==
=== Supply and demand model ===
Graph showing the basic supply and demand model of the minimum wage in the labor market

According to the supply-and-demand model of the labor market shown in many economics textbooks, increasing the minimum wage decreases employment among minimum-wage workers. One such textbook states:

If a higher minimum wage increases the wage rates of unskilled workers above the level that would be established by market forces, the quantity of unskilled workers employed will fall. The minimum wage will price the services of the least productive (and therefore lowest-wage) workers out of the market. ... the direct results of minimum wage legislation are clearly mixed. Some workers, most likely those whose previous wages were closest to the minimum, will enjoy higher wages. Others, particularly those with the lowest prelegislation wage rates, will be unable to find work. They will be pushed into the ranks of the unemployed.

A firm's cost is an increasing function of the wage rate. The higher the wage rate, the fewer hours an employer will demand of employees. This is because, as the wage rate rises, it becomes more expensive for firms to hire workers and so firms hire fewer workers (or hire them for fewer hours). The demand of labor curve is therefore shown as a line moving down and to the right. Since higher wages increase the quantity supplied, the supply of labor curve is upward sloping; it is shown as a line moving up and to the right. If no minimum wage is in place, wages will adjust until the quantity of labor demanded is equal to quantity supplied, reaching equilibrium, where the supply and demand curves intersect. The minimum wage functions as a classical price floor on labor. Standard theory says that, if set above the equilibrium price, more labor will be willing to be provided by workers than will be demanded by employers, creating a surplus of labor, i.e., unemployment. The economic model of markets predicts the same of other commodities (like milk and wheat, for example): Artificially raising the price of the commodity tends to cause an increase in quantity supplied and a decrease in quantity demanded. The result is a surplus of the commodity. When there is a wheat surplus, the government buys it. Since the government does not hire surplus labor, the labor surplus takes the form of unemployment, which tends to be higher with minimum wage laws than without them.

The supply and demand model implies that by mandating a price floor above the equilibrium wage, minimum wage laws will cause unemployment. This is because a greater number of people are willing to work at the higher wage, while a smaller number of jobs will be available at the higher wage. Companies can be more selective in whom they employ; thus, the least skilled and least experienced will typically be excluded. An increase in the minimum wage will generally affect employment only in the low-skill labor market, where the equilibrium wage is already at or below the minimum wage, whereas in higher-skill labor markets, the equilibrium wage is too high for a change in the minimum wage to affect employment.

Classical liberal and libertarian economists have long emphasized this disemployment effect as a predictible consequence of government intervention in voluntary wage contracts. Milton Friedman described the minimum wage as "anti-black" because it disproportionately harms low-skilled minority workers by preventing them from competing on prices. Empirical patterns, including higher youth unemployment, reduced hours for teens, and substitution toward automation or offshoring, align with the model across decades of data.

=== Monopsony ===
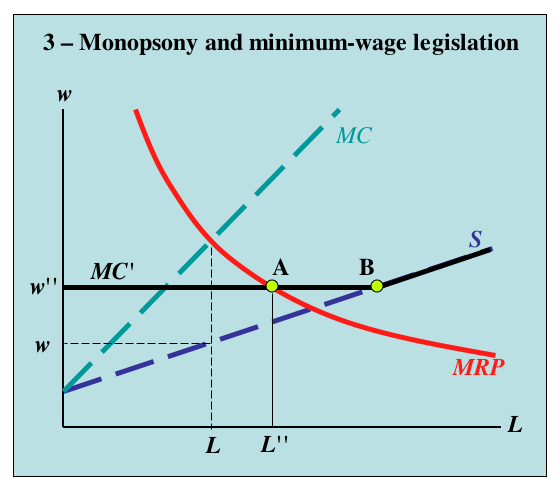
Monopsony models suggest that a moderate minimum wage may increase employment as labor markets are monopsonistic and workers lack bargaining power.

The supply and demand model predicts that raising the minimum wage helps workers whose wages are raised, but hurts people who are not hired (or who lose their jobs) when companies cut back on employment. But proponents of the minimum wage hold that the situation is much more complicated than the model can account for. One complicating factor is the possibility of monopsony in the labor market, whereby the individual employer has some market power over wages. Thus, it is at least theoretically possible that the minimum wage may boost employment. Though single-employer market power is unlikely to exist in most labor markets in the sense of the traditional 'company town,' asymmetric information, imperfect mobility, and the personal element of the labor transaction give some degree of wage-setting power to most firms.

Monopsony models predict that although an excessively high minimum wage may raise unemployment by setting the wage above the market-clearing level, a more reasonable minimum wage can increase employment and enhance growth and efficiency. This is because labor markets are monopsonistic and workers persistently lack bargaining power.

Keynesian economics predict an increase in aggregate demand due to a minimum wage hike, because lower-income individuals who benefit from the minimum wage have a higher propensity to spend their income. This, in turn, should prompt companies to expand production to meet demand, resulting in hiring and increased employment.

=== Criticisms of the supply and demand model ===
The argument that a minimum wage decreases employment is based on a simple supply-and-demand model of the labor market. A number of economists, such as Pierangelo Garegnani, Robert L. Vienneau, and Arrigo Opocher and Ian Steedman, building on the work of Piero Sraffa, argue that the model, even given all its assumptions, is logically incoherent. Michael Anyadike-Danes and Wynne Godley argue, based on simulation results, that little of the empirical work done with the textbook model constitutes a potentially falsifiable theory, and consequently empirical evidence hardly exists for that model. Graham White argues, partially based on Sraffianism, that the policy of increased labor market flexibility, including the reduction of minimum wages, does not have an "intellectually coherent" argument in economic theory.

Gary Fields, Professor of Labor Economics and Economics at Cornell University, argues that the standard textbook model for the minimum wage is ambiguous, and that the standard theoretical arguments incorrectly measure only a one-sector market. Fields says a two-sector market, where "the self-employed, service workers, and farm workers are typically excluded from minimum-wage coverage ... [and with] one sector with minimum-wage coverage and the other without it [and possible mobility between the two]," is the basis for better analysis. Through this model, Fields shows the typical theoretical argument to be ambiguous and says "the predictions derived from the textbook model definitely do not carry over to the two-sector case. Therefore, since a non-covered sector exists nearly everywhere, the predictions of the textbook model simply cannot be relied on."

An alternative view of the labor market characterizes low-wage labor markets as monopsonistic competition, in which buyers (employers) have significantly more market power than sellers (workers). This monopsony could be a result of intentional collusion between employers, or naturalistic factors such as segmented markets, search costs, information costs, imperfect mobility, and the personal element of labor markets. Such a case is a type of market failure and results in workers being paid less than their marginal value. Under the monopsonistic assumption, an appropriately set minimum wage could increase both wages and employment, with the optimal level being equal to the marginal product of labor. This view emphasizes the role of minimum wages as a market regulation policy akin to antitrust policies, as opposed to an illusory "free lunch" for low-wage workers.

Another reason minimum wage may not affect employment in certain industries is that the demand for the product the employees produce is highly inelastic. For example, if management is forced to increase wages, management can pass on the increase in wage to consumers in the form of higher prices. Since demand for the product is highly inelastic, consumers continue to buy it at the higher price, so the manager is not forced to lay off workers. Economist Paul Krugman argues this explanation neglects to explain why the firm was not charging this higher price absent the minimum wage.

Three other possible reasons minimum wages do not affect employment were suggested by Alan Blinder: higher wages may reduce turnover, and hence training costs; raising the minimum wage may "render moot" the potential problem of recruiting workers at a higher wage than current workers; and minimum wage workers might represent such a small proportion of a business' cost that the increase is too small to matter. He admits that he does not know if these are correct, but argues that "the list demonstrates that one can accept the new empirical findings and still be a card-carrying economist".

=== Mathematical models of the minimum wage and frictional labor markets ===
The following mathematical models are more quantitative in orientation and highlight some of the difficulties in determining the impact of the minimum wage on labor market outcomes. Specifically, these models focus on labor markets with frictions. They may result in positive or negative outcomes from raising the minimum wage, depending on the circumstances.

==== Welfare and labor market participation ====
Assume that the decision to participate in the labor market results from a trade-off between being an unemployed job seeker and not participating at all. All individuals whose expected utility outside the labor market is less than the expected utility of an unemployed person $V_{u}$ decide to participate in the labor market. In the basic search and matching model, the expected utility of unemployed persons $V_{u}$ and that of employed persons $V_{e}$ are defined by:

$$\begin{aligned}
rV_{e} &= w + q(V_{u}-V_{e}) \\
rV_{u} &= z + \theta m(\theta) (V_{e}-V_{u})
\end{aligned}$$
Let $w$ be the wage, $r$ the interest rate, $z$ the instantaneous income of unemployed persons, $q$ the exogenous job destruction rate, $\theta$ the labor market tightness, and $\theta m(\theta)$ the job finding rate. The profits $\Pi_{e}$ and $\Pi_{v}$ expected from a filled job and a vacant one are:
$$r\Pi_{e} = y-w+q(\Pi_{v}-\Pi_{e}), \quad r\Pi_{v} = -h + m(\theta)(\Pi_{e}-\Pi_{v})$$
where $h$ is the cost of a vacant job and $y$ is the productivity. When the free entry condition $\Pi_{v} = 0$ is satisfied, these two equalities yield the following relationship between the wage $w$ and labor market tightness $\theta$:

$${h\over{m(\theta)}} = {y-w\over{r+q}}$$
If $w$ represents a minimum wage that applies to all workers, this equation completely determines the equilibrium value of the labor market tightness $\theta$. There are two conditions associated with the matching function:
$$m'(\theta) < 0, \quad [\theta m(\theta)]' > 0$$
This implies that $\theta$ is a decreasing function of the minimum wage $w$, and so is the job finding rate $\alpha = \theta m(\theta)$. A hike in the minimum wage reduces the profitability of a job, so firms post fewer vacancies and the job-finding rate falls. Now let's rewrite $rV_{u}$ to be:
$$rV_{u} = {(r+q)z + \theta m(\theta) w\over{r+q + \theta m(\theta)}}$$
Using the relationship between the wage and labor market tightness to eliminate the wage from the last equation gives us:
$$rV_{u} = {\theta m(\theta)y + (r+q)z - \theta(r+q)h\over{r+q + \theta m(\theta)}}$$
By maximizing $rV_{u}$ in this equation, with respect to the labor market tightness, it follows that:
$${[1-\eta(\theta)](y-z)\over{r+q+\eta(\theta)\theta m(\theta)}} = {h\over{m(\theta)}}$$
where $\eta(\theta)$ is the elasticity of the matching function:
$$\eta(\theta) = -\theta{m'(\theta)\over{m(\theta)}} \equiv -\theta {d\over{d\theta}}\log m(\theta)$$
This result shows that the expected utility of unemployed workers is maximized when the minimum wage is set at a level that corresponds to the wage level of the decentralized economy in which the bargaining power parameter is equal to the elasticity $\eta(\theta)$. The level of the negotiated wage is $w^{*}$.

If $w < w^{*}$, then an increase in the minimum wage increases participation and the unemployment rate, with an ambiguous impact on employment. When the bargaining power of workers is less than $\eta(\theta)$, an increase in the minimum wage improves the welfare of the unemployed – this suggests that minimum wage hikes can improve labor market efficiency, at least up to the point when bargaining power equals $\eta(\theta)$.

==== Job search effort ====
In the model just presented, the minimum wage always increases unemployment. This result does not necessarily hold when workers' search effort is endogenous.

Consider a model where the intensity of the job search is designated by the scalar $\epsilon$, which can be interpreted as the amount of time and/or intensity of the effort devoted to search. Assume that the arrival rate of job offers is $\alpha\epsilon$ and that the wage distribution is degenerated to a single wage $w$. Denote $\varphi(\epsilon)$ to be the cost arising from the search effort, with $\varphi' > 0, \; \varphi'' > 0$. Then the discounted utilities are given by:
$$\begin{aligned}
rV_{e} &= w + q(V_{u}-V_{e}) \\
rV_{u} &= \max_{\epsilon} \; z - \varphi(\epsilon) + \alpha \epsilon(V_{e}-V_{u})
\end{aligned}$$
Therefore, the optimal search effort is such that the marginal cost of performing the search is equation to the marginal return:
$$\varphi'(\epsilon) = \alpha(V_{e}-V_{u})$$
This implies that the optimal search effort increases as the difference between the expected utility of the job holder and the expected utility of the job seeker grows. In fact, this difference actually grows with the wage. To see this, take the difference of the two discounted utilities to find:
$$(r+q)(V_{e}-V_{u}) = w-\max_{\epsilon}\left[z - \varphi(\epsilon) + \alpha \epsilon(V_{e}-V_{u}) \right]$$
Then differentiating with respect to $w$ and rearranging gives us:
$${d\over{dw}}(V_{e}-V_{u}) = {1\over{r+q+\alpha\epsilon^{*}}} > 0$$
where $\epsilon^{*}$ is the optimal search effort. This implies that a wage increase drives up job-search effort and, therefore, the job-finding rate. Additionally, the unemployment rate $u$ at equilibrium is given by:
$$u = {q\over{q+\alpha\epsilon}}$$
A hike in the wage, which increases the search effort and the job finding rate, decreases the unemployment rate. So it is possible that a hike in the minimum wage may, by boosting job seekers' search effort, increase employment. Taken together with the previous section, the minimum wage in labor markets with frictions can increase employment and reduce the unemployment rate when it is sufficiently low. However, a high minimum wage is detrimental to employment and increases the unemployment rate.

== Empirical studies ==
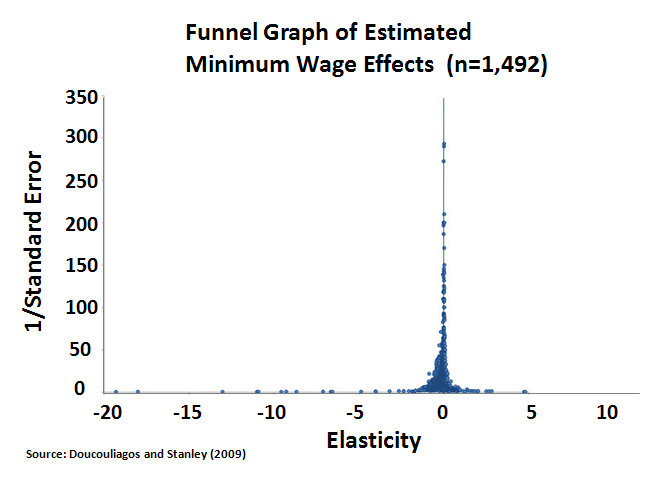
Estimated minimum wage effects on employment from a meta-study of 64 other studies showed insignificant employment effect (both practically and statistically) from minimum-wage raises. The most precise estimates were heavily clustered at or near zero employment effects (elasticity = 0).

Economists disagree as to the impact of minimum wages on employment. Empirical studies usually estimate the elasticity of employment with respect to the minimum wage level. This is done by dividing the estimated causal effect on employment rate by the percentage change in the minimum wage.

Economists have done empirical studies on different aspects of the minimum wage, including:

- Employment effects, the most frequently studied aspect
- Effects on the distribution of wages and earnings among low-paid and higher-paid workers
- Effects on the distribution of incomes among low-income and higher-income families
- Effects on the skills of workers through job training and the deferring of work to acquire education
- Effects on prices and profits
- Effects on on-the-job training

Until the mid-1990s, a consensus existed among economists–both conservative and liberal–that the minimum wage reduced employment, especially among younger and low-skill workers. In addition to the basic supply-demand intuition, there were some empirical studies that supported this view. For example, Edward Gramlich in 1976 found that many of the benefits went to higher income families, and that teenagers were made worse off by the unemployment associated with the minimum wage.

Brown et al. (1983) noted that, to that point, time-series studies had found that a 10 percent increase in the minimum wage was associated with a 1–3 percent decrease in teenage employment. However, the studies found wider variation, from 0 to over 3 percent, in their estimates for the effect on teenage unemployment (teenagers without a job and looking for one). In contrast to the simple supply and demand diagram, it was commonly found that teenagers withdrew from the labor force in response to the minimum wage, which produced the possibility of equal reductions in the supply as well as the demand for labor at a higher minimum wage, and hence no impact on the unemployment rate. Using a variety of specifications of the employment and unemployment equations (using ordinary least squares vs. generalized least squares regression procedures, and linear vs. logarithmic specifications), they found that a 10 percent increase in the minimum wage caused a 1 percent decrease in teenage employment, and no change in the teenage unemployment rate. The study also found a small but statistically significant increase in unemployment among adults aged 20–24.

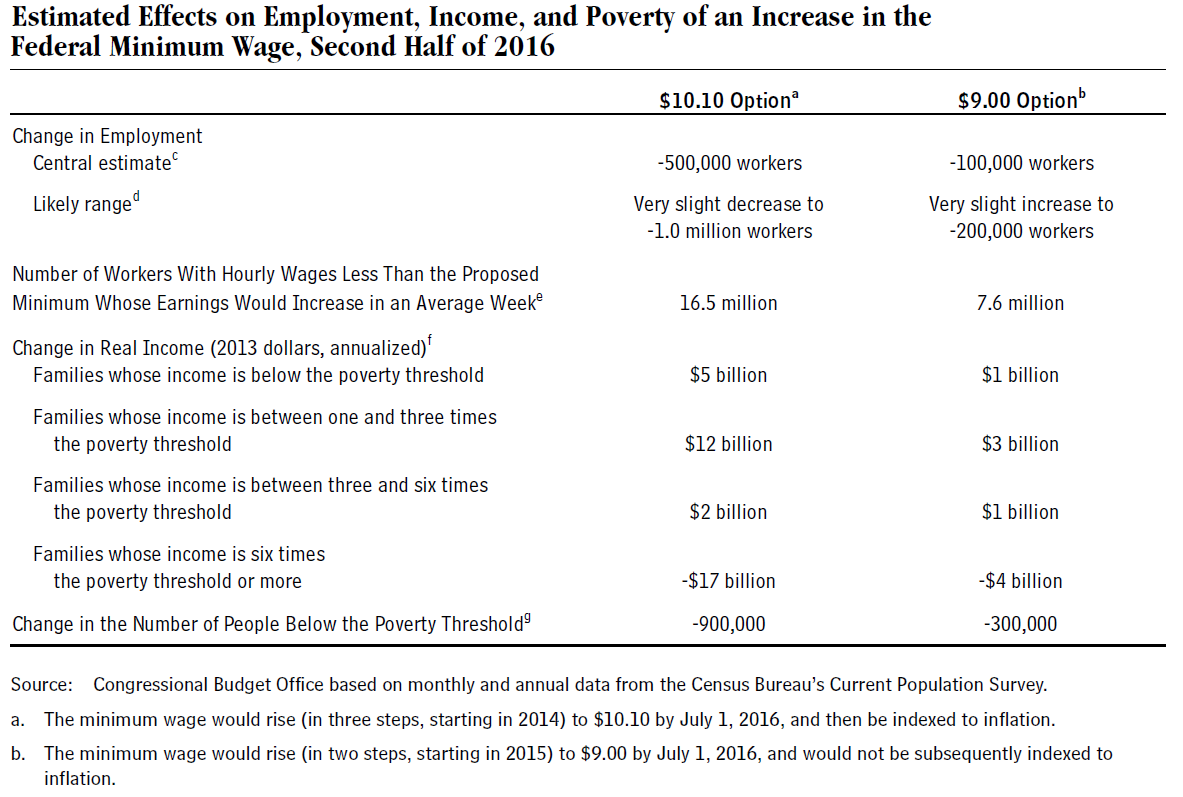
CBO table illustrating projections of the effects of minimum wage increases on employment and income, under two scenarios

Wellington (1991) updated Brown et al.'s research with data through 1986 to provide new estimates encompassing a period when the real (i.e., inflation-adjusted) value of the minimum wage was declining, because it had not increased since 1981. She found that a 10% increase in the minimum wage decreased absolute teenage employment by 0.6%, with no effect on the teen or young-adult unemployment rates.

Some research suggests that other factors dominate the unemployment effects of small increases in the minimum wage. In Florida, where voters approved an increase in 2004, a follow-up comprehensive study after the increase confirmed a strong economy with increased employment above previous years in Florida and better than in the US as a whole. When it comes to on-the-job training, some believe the increase in wages is taken out of training expenses. A 2001 empirical study found that there is "no evidence that minimum wages reduce training, and little evidence that they tend to increase training".

The Economist wrote in December 2013: "A minimum wage, providing it is not set too high, could thus boost pay with no ill effects on jobs....America's federal minimum wage, at 38% of median income, is one of the rich world's lowest. Some studies find no harm to employment from federal or state minimum wages, others see a small one, but none finds any serious damage. ... High minimum wages, however, particularly in rigid labour markets, do appear to hit employment. France has the rich world's highest wage floor, at more than 60% of the median for adults and a far bigger fraction of the typical wage for the young. This helps explain why France also has shockingly high rates of youth unemployment: 26% for 15- to 24-year-olds."

A 2019 study in the Quarterly Journal of Economics found that minimum wage increases did not affect the overall number of low-wage jobs in the five years following the wage increase. However, it did find disemployment in 'tradable' sectors, defined as those sectors most reliant on entry-level or low-skilled labor.

A 2018 study published by the University of California agrees with the study in the Quarterly Journal of Economics; it finds that minimum wages actually lead to fewer jobs for low-skilled workers. The article discusses a trade-off for low- to high-skilled workers: when the minimum wage is increased, GDP is more heavily redistributed toward high-academia jobs.

In another study, which shared authors with the above, published in the American Economic Review, found that a large and persistent increase in the minimum wage in Hungary produced some disemployment, with the large majority of additional cost being passed on to consumers. The authors also found that firms began substituting capital for labor over time.

=== David Card and Alan Krueger ===
In 1992, the minimum wage in New Jersey increased from $4.25 to $5.05 per hour (an 18.8% increase), while in the adjacent state of Pennsylvania, it remained at $4.25. David Card and Alan Krueger gathered information on fast food restaurants in New Jersey and eastern Pennsylvania in an attempt to see what effect this increase had on employment within New Jersey via a Difference in differences model. A basic supply-and-demand model predicts that relative employment should have decreased in New Jersey. Card and Krueger surveyed employers before the April 1992 New Jersey increase, and again in November–December 1992, asking managers for data on the full-time equivalent staff level of their restaurants both times. Based on data from the employers' responses, the authors concluded that the increase in the minimum wage slightly increased employment in the New Jersey restaurants.

Card and Krueger expanded on this initial article in their 1995 book Myth and Measurement: The New Economics of the Minimum Wage. They argued that the negative employment effects of minimum wage laws are minimal if not non-existent. For example, they look at the 1992 increase in New Jersey's minimum wage, the 1988 rise in California's minimum wage, and the 1990–91 increases in the federal minimum wage. In addition to their own findings, they reanalyzed earlier studies using updated data, generally finding that the earlier negative employment effects did not hold up in the larger datasets. This had major implications on policy, challenging long-held economic views that increasing minimum wage led to deadweight loss.

=== Research after Card's and Krueger's work ===
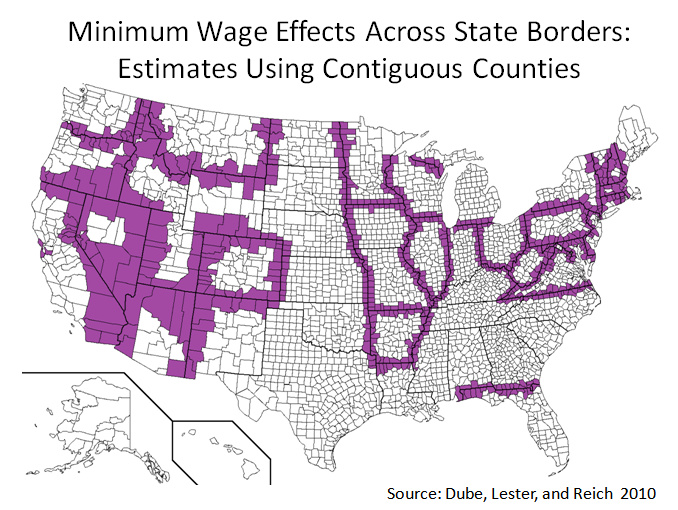
A 2010 study published in the Review of Economics and Statistics compared 288 pairs of contiguous U.S. counties with minimum wage differentials from 1990 to 2006 and found no adverse employment effects from a minimum wage increase. Contiguous counties with different minimum wages are in purple. All other counties are in white.

In 1996, David Neumark and William Wascher reexamined Card and Krueger's results using payroll records from large fast-food chains and reported that minimum wage increases led to decreases in employment. Their initial findings did not contradict Card and Krueger, but a later version showed a four percent decrease in employment, with statistically significant disemployment effects in some cases. Card and Krueger rebutted these conclusions in a 2000 paper.

A 2011 paper reconciled differences between datasets, showing positive employment effects for small restaurants but negative effects for large fast-food chains. A 2014 analysis found that minimum wage reduces employment among teenagers.

A 2010 study using Card and Krueger's methodology supported their original findings, showing no negative effects on low-wage employment.

A 2011 study by Baskaya and Rubinstein found that federal minimum wage increases negatively impacted employment, particularly among teenagers. Other studies, including a 2012 study by Sabia, Hansen, and Burkhauser, found substantial adverse effects on low-skilled employment, particularly among young workers.

A 2019 paper in the Quarterly Journal of Economics argued that job losses in studies like those by Meer and West, who found that a minimum wage "significantly reduces rates of job growth", are driven by unrealistic assumptions and that the effects of the minimum wage are more complex. Another 2013 study by Fang and Lin found significant adverse effects on employment in China, particularly among women, young adults, and low-skilled workers.

A 2017 study in Seattle found that raising the minimum wage to $13 per hour reduced the incomes of low-wage workers because they worked fewer hours as businesses adjusted to higher labor costs. A 2019 study in Arizona suggested that smaller minimum wage increases might lead to slight economic growth without significantly distorting labor markets.

In 2019, economists from Georgia Tech found that minimum wage increases could harm small businesses by increasing bankruptcy rates and reducing hiring, with significant impacts on minority-owned businesses.

The Congressional Budget Office's 2019 report on a proposed $15 federal minimum wage predicted modest improvements in take-home pay for those who retained employment but warned of potential job losses, reduced hours, and increased costs of goods and services. Similarly, a 2019 study found that increasing the minimum wage could lead to increased crime among young adults.

Studies from Denmark and Spain further highlighted that significant increases in the minimum wage could lead to substantial job losses, particularly among young workers. A 2021 study on Germany's minimum wage found that while wages increased without reducing employment, there were significant structural shifts in the economy, including reduced competition and increased commuting times for workers.

A 2010 study on the UK minimum wage found that it did not cause immediate price increases but led to faster price rises in sectors with many low-wage workers over the long term. A 2012 UK study (1997–2007) found the minimum wage reduced wage inequality and had neutral to positive effects on employment. Another 2012 UK study found no "spill-over" effects from the minimum wage on higher-earning brackets. A 2016 US study associated the minimum wage with reduced wage inequality and possible spill-over effects, though these might be due to measurement error.

=== Meta-analyses ===
- A 2013 meta-analysis of 16 UK studies found no significant employment effects from the minimum wage.
- A 2007 meta-analysis by Neumark found a consistent, though not always significant, negative effect on employment.
- A 2019 meta-analysis of developed countries reported minimal employment effects and significant earnings increases for low-paid workers.

In 1995, Card and Krueger noted evidence of publication bias in time-series studies of minimum wages, favoring studies showing negative employment effects. A 2005 study by T.D. Stanley confirmed this bias and suggested no clear link between the minimum wage and unemployment. A 2008 meta-analysis by Doucouliagos and Stanley supported Card and Krueger's findings, showing little to no negative association between minimum wages and employment after correcting for publication bias.

== Debate over consequences ==
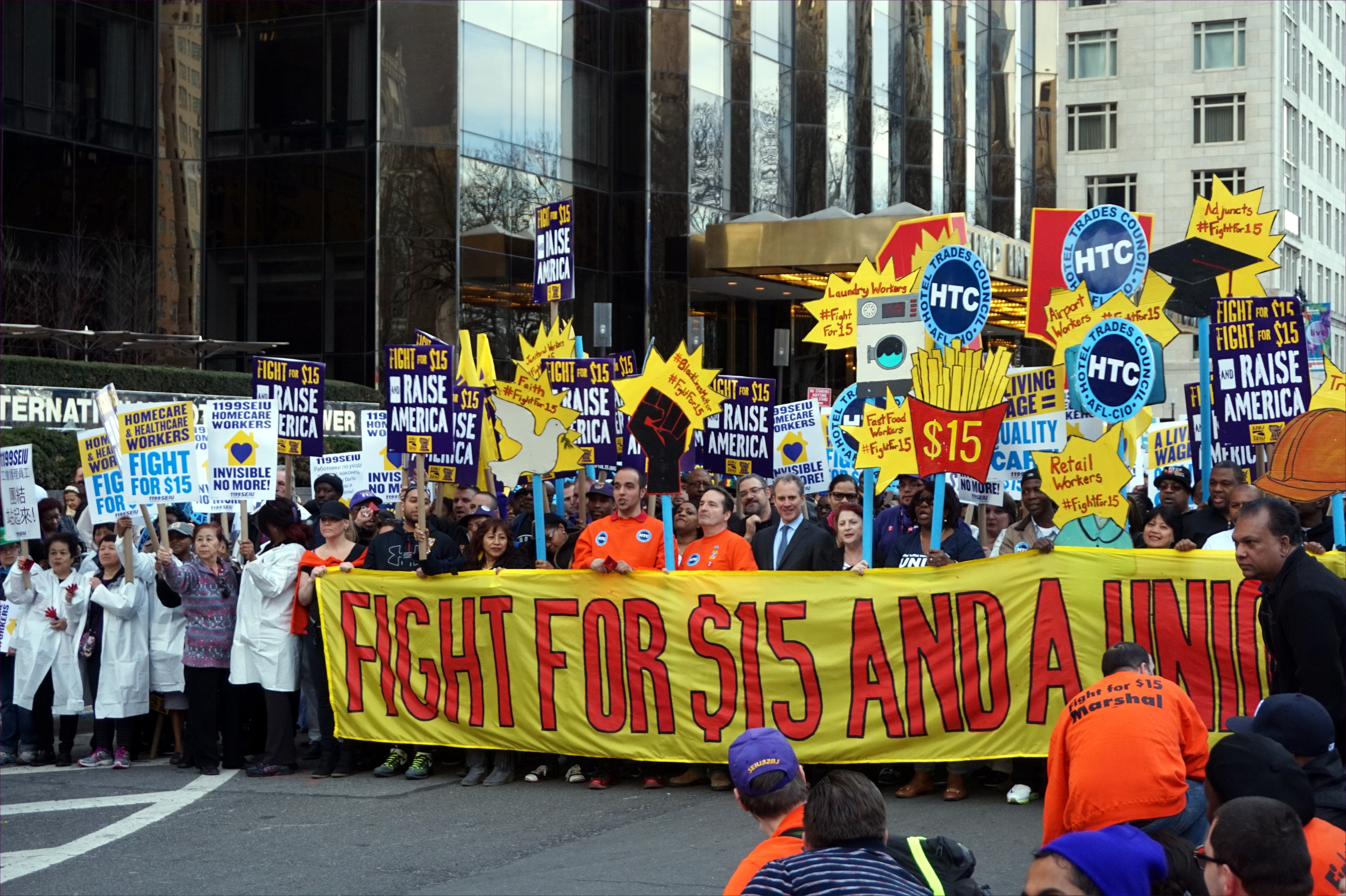
Protesters in New York City call for an increased minimum wage as part of the "Fight for $15" movement to require a US$15 per hour minimum wage, 2015.

Minimum wage laws affect workers in most low-paid fields of employment and have usually been judged against the criterion of reducing poverty. Minimum wage laws receive less support from economists than from the general public. Despite decades of experience and economic research, debates about the costs and benefits of minimum wages continue today.

Various groups have great ideological, political, financial, and emotional investments in issues surrounding minimum wage laws. For example, agencies that administer the laws have a vested interest in showing that "their" laws do not create unemployment, as do labor unions whose members' finances are protected by minimum wage laws. On the other side of the issue, low-wage employers such as restaurants finance the Employment Policies Institute, which has released numerous studies opposing the minimum wage. The presence of these powerful groups and factors means that the debate on the issue is not always based on dispassionate analysis. Additionally, it is extraordinarily difficult to separate the effects of the minimum wage from other variables that affect employment.

Studies have found that minimum wages have the following positive effects:

- Improves the functioning of the low-wage labor market, which may be characterized by employer-side market power (monopsony).
- Raises family incomes at the bottom of the income distribution, and lowers poverty.
- Positive impact on small business owners and industry.
- Encourages education, resulting in better-paying jobs.
- Increases incentives to take jobs, as opposed to other methods of transferring income to the poor that are not tied to employment (such as food subsidies for the poor or welfare payments for the unemployed).
- Increased job growth and creation.
- Encourages efficiency and automation of industry.
- Removes low-paying jobs, forcing workers to train for, and move to, higher-paying jobs.
- Increases technological development. Costly technology that increases business efficiency is more appealing as the price of labor increases.
- Encourages people to join the workforce rather than pursuing money through illegal means, e.g., selling illegal drugs

Studies have found the following negative effects:

- Minimum wage alone is not effective at alleviating poverty, and in fact produces a net increase in poverty due to disemployment effects.
- As a labor market analogue of political-economic protectionism, it excludes low-cost competitors from labor markets and hampers firms in reducing wage costs during trade downturns. This generates various industrial-economic inefficiencies.
- Reduces the quantity demanded of workers, either through a reduction in the number of hours worked by individuals or through a reduction in the number of jobs.
- Wage/price spiral
- Encourages employers to replace low-skilled workers with computers, such as self-checkout machines.
- Increases property crime and misery in poor communities by decreasing legal markets of production and consumption in those communities;
- Can result in the exclusion of certain groups (ethnic, gender, etc.) from the labor force.
- Is less effective than other methods (e.g., the Earned Income Tax Credit) at reducing poverty, and is more damaging to businesses than those other methods.
- Discourages further education among people with low incomes by enticing people to enter the job market.
- Discriminates against, through pricing out, less qualified workers (including newcomers to the labor market, e.g., young workers) by keeping them from accumulating work experience and qualifications, hence potentially graduating to higher wages later.
- Slows growth in the creation of low-skilled jobs
- Results in jobs moving to other areas or countries, which allow lower-cost labor.
- Results in higher long-term unemployment.
- Results in higher prices for consumers, where products and services are produced by minimum-wage workers (though non-labor costs represent a greater proportion of costs to consumers in industries like fast food and discount retail)

A widely circulated argument that the minimum wage was ineffective at reducing poverty was provided by George Stigler in 1949:

- Employment may fall more than in proportion to the wage increase, thereby reducing overall earnings;
- As uncovered sectors of the economy absorb workers released from the covered sectors, the decrease in wages in the uncovered sectors may exceed the increase in wages in the covered ones;
- The impact of the minimum wage on family income distribution may be negative unless the fewer but better jobs are allocated to members of needy families rather than to, for example, teenagers from families not in poverty;
- Forbidding employers to pay less than a legal minimum is equivalent to forbidding workers from selling their labor for less than the minimum wage. The legal restriction that employers cannot pay less than a legislated wage is equivalent to the legal restriction that workers cannot work in the protected sector at all unless they can find employers willing to hire them at that wage. That may be seen as a legal violation of human right to work in its most basic interpretation as "a right to engage in productive employment, and not to be prevented from doing so".

In 2006, the International Labour Organization (ILO) argued that the minimum wage could not be directly linked to unemployment in countries that have suffered job losses. In April 2010, the Organisation for Economic Co-operation and Development (OECD) released a report arguing that countries could alleviate teen unemployment by "lowering the cost of employing low-skilled youth" through a sub-minimum training wage. A study of U.S. states showed that businesses' annual and average payrolls grow faster and employment grew at a faster rate in states with a minimum wage. The study showed a correlation, but did not claim to prove causation.

Although strongly opposed by both the business community and the Conservative Party when introduced in the UK in 1999, the Conservatives reversed their opposition in 2000. Accounts differ as to the effects of the minimum wage. The Centre for Economic Performance found no discernible impact on employment levels from the wage increases, while the Low Pay Commission found that employers had reduced their rate of hiring and employee hours employed, and found ways to cause current workers to be more productive (especially service companies). The Institute for the Study of Labor found prices in minimum wage sectors (Note: notably take-away foods, canteen meals, hotel services and domestic services) rose faster than other sectors, especially in the four years after its introduction. Neither trade unions nor employer organizations contest the minimum wage, although the latter had especially done so heavily until 1999.

In 2014, supporters of minimum wage cited a study that found that job creation within the United States is faster in states that raised their minimum wages. In 2014, supporters of minimum wage cited news organizations who reported the state with the highest minimum-wage garnered more job creation than the rest of the United States.

In 2014, in Seattle, Washington, liberal and progressive business owners who had supported the city's new $15 minimum wage said they might hold off on expanding their businesses and thus creating new jobs due to the uncertain timeline for implementing the wage increase. However, subsequently at least two of the business owners quoted did expand.

Concerning the economic effects of introducing minimum wage legislation in Germany in January 2015, recent developments have shown that the feared increase in unemployment has not materialized; however, in some economic sectors and regions of the country, there has been a decline in job opportunities, particularly for temporary and part-time workers, and some low-wage jobs have disappeared entirely. Because of this overall positive development, the Deutsche Bundesbank revised its opinion, and ascertained that "the impact of the introduction of the minimum wage on the total volume of work appears to be very limited in the present business cycle".

A 2019 study published in the American Journal of Preventive Medicine showed that in the United States, those states that have implemented a higher minimum wage saw a decline in the growth of suicide rates. The researchers say that for every one-dollar increase, the annual suicide growth rate fell by 1.9%. The study covers all 50 states for the years 2006 to 2016.

According to a 2020 US study, the cost of a 10% minimum wage increase for grocery store workers was fully passed through to consumers as a 0.4% increase in grocery prices. Similarly, a 2021 study that covered 10,000 McDonald's restaurants in the US found that between 2016 and 2020, the cost of 10% minimum wage increases for McDonald's workers were passed through to customers as 1.4% increases in the price of a Big Mac. This results in minimum wage workers getting a lesser increase in their "real wage" than in their nominal wage, because any goods and services they purchase made with minimum-wage labor have now increased in cost, analogous to an increase in the sales tax.

According to a 2019 review of the academic literature by Arindrajit Dube, "overall, the most up to date body of research from US, UK and other developed countries points to a very muted effect of minimum wages on employment, while significantly increasing the earnings of low paid workers."

According to a 2021 study, " The Minimum Wage, EITC, and Criminal Recidivism," a $0.50 increase in the minimum wage reduces the probability that an ex-incarcerated individual returns to prison within 3 years by 2.15%; these reductions come mainly from recidivism for property and drug crimes.

== Surveys of economists ==
There used to be agreement among economists that the minimum wage adversely affected employment, but that consensus shifted in the early 1990s due to new research findings. According to one 2021 assessment, "there is no consensus on the employment effects of the minimum wage".

According to a 1978 article in the American Economic Review, 90% of the economists surveyed agreed that the minimum wage increases unemployment among low-skilled workers. By 1992, the survey found 79% of economists in agreement with that statement, and by 2000, 46% were in full agreement with the statement and 28% agreed with provisos (74% total). The authors of the 2000 study also reweighted data from a 1990 sample to show that at that time 62% of academic economists agreed with the statement above, while 20% agreed with provisos and 18% disagreed. They state that the reduction in consensus on this question is "likely" due to the Card and Krueger research and subsequent debate.

A similar 2006 survey by Robert Whaples polled PhD members of the American Economic Association (AEA). Whaples found that 47% respondents wanted the minimum wage eliminated, 38% supported an increase, 14% wanted it kept at the current level, and 1% wanted it decreased. Another survey in 2007 conducted by the University of New Hampshire Survey Center found that 73% of labor economists surveyed in the United States believed 150% of the then-current minimum wage would result in employment losses and 68% believed a mandated minimum wage would cause an increase in hiring of workers with greater skills. 31% felt that no hiring changes would result.

Surveys of labor economists have found a sharp split on the minimum wage. Fuchs et al. (1998) polled labor economists at the top 40 research universities in the United States on a variety of questions in the summer of 1996. Their 65 respondents were nearly evenly divided on whether the minimum wage should be increased. They argued that the different policy views were not related to views on whether raising the minimum wage would reduce teen employment (the median economist estimated a 1% reduction), but rather to value differences, such as income redistribution. Daniel B. Klein and Stewart Dompe conclude, based on previous surveys, "the average level of support for the minimum wage is somewhat higher among labor economists than among AEA members."

In 2007, Klein and Dompe conducted a non-anonymous survey of supporters of the minimum wage who had signed the "Raise the Minimum Wage" statement published by the Economic Policy Institute. 95 of the 605 signatories responded. They found that a majority signed because it transferred income from employers to workers, or equalized bargaining power between them in the labor market. In addition, a majority considered disemployment to be a moderate potential drawback to the increase they supported.

In 2013, a diverse group of 37 economics professors was surveyed about their views on the minimum wage's impact on employment. 34% of respondents agreed with the statement, "Raising the federal minimum wage to $9 per hour would make it noticeably harder for low-skilled workers to find employment." 32% disagreed, and the remaining respondents were uncertain or had no opinion. 47% agreed with the statement, "The distortionary costs of raising the federal minimum wage to $9 per hour and indexing it to inflation are sufficiently small compared with the benefits to low-skilled workers who can find employment that this would be a desirable policy", while 11% disagreed.

== Alternatives ==
Economists and other political commentators have proposed alternatives to the minimum wage. They argue that these alternatives may address poverty better than a minimum wage, as they would benefit a broader population of low-wage earners, not cause unemployment, and distribute costs more widely rather than concentrating them on employers of low-wage workers.

=== Universal basic income ===
Tom Holden at the Social Liberal Forum proposed a universal basic income as a replacement for the minimum wage that would reduce the economic distortions caused by the minimum wage.

=== Refundable tax credit ===
A refundable tax credit is a mechanism whereby the tax system can reduce the tax owed by a household to below zero, resulting in a net payment to the taxpayer beyond their own payments into the tax system. Examples of refundable tax credits include the earned income tax credit and the additional child tax credit in the US, and working tax credits and child tax credits in the UK. Such a system is slightly different from a negative income tax, in that the refundable tax credit is usually only paid to households that have earned at least some income. This policy is more targeted against poverty than the minimum wage, because it avoids subsidizing low-income workers who are supported by high-income households (for example, teenagers still living with their parents).

In the United States, earned income tax credit rates, also known as EITC or EIC, vary by state—some are refundable, while others are not. The federal EITC program has been expanded by many presidents including Jimmy Carter, Ronald Reagan, George H.W. Bush, and Bill Clinton. In 1986, President Reagan described the EITC as "the best anti-poverty, the best pro-family, the best job creation measure to come out of Congress". The ability of the earned income tax credit to deliver larger monetary benefits to the poor workers than an increase in the minimum wage and at a lower cost to society was documented in a 2007 report by the Congressional Budget Office.

The Adam Smith Institute prefers cutting taxes on the poor and middle class instead of raising wages as an alternative to the minimum wage.

=== Collective bargaining ===
Italy, Sweden, Norway, Finland, and Denmark are developed nations where legislation stipulates no minimum wage. Instead, minimum wage standards in different sectors are set by collective bargaining. Particularly the Scandinavian countries have very high union participation rates.

=== Wage subsidies ===
Some economists such as Scott Sumner and Edmund Phelps advocate a wage subsidy program. A wage subsidy is a payment made by a government for work people do. It is based either on an hourly basis or by income earned. Wage subsidies lack political support from either major political party in the United States.

=== Education and training ===
Providing education or funding for apprenticeships or technical training can serve as a bridge for low-skilled workers to move into higher-paying jobs. For example, Germany has adopted a state-funded apprenticeship program that combines on-the-job and classroom training. Having more skills makes workers more valuable and more productive, but having a high minimum wage for low-skill jobs reduces the incentive to seek education and training. Moving some workers to higher-paying jobs will decrease the supply of workers willing to accept low-skill jobs, increasing the market wage for those low-skilled jobs (assuming a stable labor market). However, in that solution, the wage will still not rise above the role's marginal return and will likely promote automation or business closures.

== By country ==
=== Argentina ===
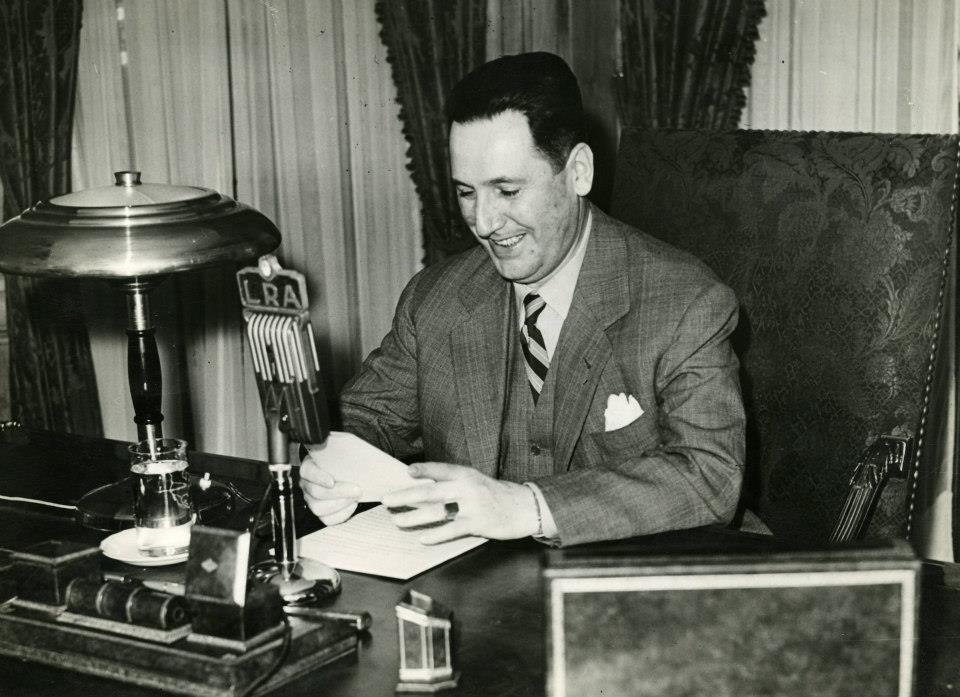
President of Argentina, Juan Domingo Perón, who introduced the minimum wage in 1945 as Secretary of Labour, and later reformed the Constitution to add the minimum wage

The minimum wage was introduced in Argentina in 1945, by Juan Domingo Perón, when he was Secretary of Labour during the government of Edelmiro Farrell. When Perón became president, he added it to the Constitutional Reform of 1949, however, the dictatorship that overthrew his government in 1955 eliminated the constitutional hierarchy the minimum wage that obtained.

In 1964, the minimum wage was reincorporated by the Congress in the Law 16.459

=== Australia ===
In Australia, the Fair Work Commission (FWC) is responsible for determining and setting the national minimum wage, the minimum wages in awards, and wage rates for particular occupations and industries. The Fair Work Act 2009 establishes an Expert panel tasked with providing and maintaining a safety net of a fair minimum wage. The Expert panel consists of the panel president, three full-time commission members, and three part-time commission members. All members must have experience in workplace relations, economics, social policy, or business, industry, and commerce, and can inform their decision-making through commissioning a range of economic and social research.

The legislative framework requires that, in setting minimum wages, the Expert Panel take into account the current state of the economy, including inflation, business competitiveness, productivity, and employment growth. In addition, the Expert panel must consider the social goals of promoting social inclusion, the standard of living of the low-paid, equal remuneration for work of equal or comparable value, and reasonable wages for junior employees, employees whose jobs have training requirements, and employees with disabilities. See Fair Work Act 2009 for more information.

The Expert panel conducts yearly wage reviews to determine if the minimum wage needs to be adjusted based on the economy's current and projected performance. The annual minimum wage review decisions in 2016–17 found, based on research tendered and submissions to the review, that moderate increases to minimum wages do not inhibit workplace participation or result in disemployment. This position was carried over to the 2017–18 and 2018–19 decisions and informed the decisions, including the 2018–19 decision, which delivered a 3% minimum wage increase when the corresponding headline rate of inflation was 1.3%. In the annual minimum wage review decisions of 2019–20 and 2020–21, the FWC was considerably more constrained in setting minimum wages due to uncertain economic conditions during the COVID-19 pandemic and the 2020–21 decision noted the uncertainty of the impact of increases in the minimum wages for youth employment.

=== Lebanon ===
After two years of financial trouble, Lebanon, as of 2021, ranks among the 10 countries with the lowest minimum wages due to the collapse of the local pound following the Lebanese financial crisis that began in August 2019.

The minimum monthly wage set at LBP 675,000, which valued US$450 before the crisis, is barely reaching US$30 nowadays. The currency has lost nearly 90% of its value and drove three quarters of residents into poverty.

Article 44 of the Lebanese Code of Labor states that, "the minimum pay must be sufficient to meet the essential needs of the wage-earner or salary-earner and his family", and according to Article 46, "the minimum pay assessed shall be rectified whenever economic circumstances render such review necessary".

=== Mexico ===
Mexico sets daily wage, computing monthly wage (6 day work week), multiplies 30.41 (days for paid weekly allowance) by daily wage. All region has same minimum rates except for Northern Border Free Zone. The Mexico government's announced to raise minimum wage rapidly to boost purchasing power from 2018 with 10~15% increase, this represents president's will to make it better for individuals life quality. This raise is part of a continued effort to boost worker income and represents a significant increase in purchasing power. Aiming their weekly work hours (48 hours) to reduce to 40 hours/week by 2030.

=== Republic of Ireland ===
The national minimum wage was introduced in the Republic of Ireland in April 2000. Before this, minimum wages were set by industry-specific Joint Labour Committees. However, coverage for workers was low, and the agreements were poorly enforced; moreover, those covered by the agreements received low wages.

As of April 2000, the government introduced a national minimum wage of €5.58 per hour. The minimum wage increased steadily from 2000 to 2007, reaching €8.65 per hour in July 2007. As the global economic downturn hit the country in 2008, there were no further wage increases until 2016, when the minimum wage was increased to 9.15.

Before 2019, there existed specific categories of employees that earned sub-minimum wage rates, expressed as a percentage of the full rate of pay. Employees under the age of 18 were eligible to earn 70 per cent of the minimum wage, employees in the first year of employment were eligible to earn 80 per cent, employees in the second year of full employment were eligible to earn 90 per cent and employees in structured training during working hours were eligible to earn 75, 80 or 90 per cent depending on their level of progression. This framework has since been abolished in favor of one based on the employee's age.

As of 1 January 2022, the minimum wage is €10.50. Those aged 20 and over are eligible to receive 100 percent of the minimum wage. Those under the age of 18 are eligible to receive 70 percent of the minimum wage, those aged 18 are eligible to receive 80 percent of the minimum wage and those aged 19 are eligible receive 90 percent of the minimum wage.

=== South Korea ===
Minimum wage in South Korea with terms of presidents

The South Korean government enacted the Minimum Wage Act on December 31, 1986. The Minimum Wage System began on January 1, 1988. At this time the economy was booming, and the minimum wage set by the government was less than 30 percent of that of other workers. The Minister of Employment and Labor in Korea asks the Minimum Wage Commission to review the minimum wage by March 31 every year. The Minimum Wage Commission must submit the minimum wage bill within 90 days after the request has been received by the 27 committee members. If there is no objection, the new minimum wage will then take effect from January 1. The minimum wage committee decided to raise the minimum wage in 2018 by 16.4% from the previous year to 7,530 won (US$7.03) per hour. This is the largest increase since 2001 when it was increased by 16.8%.

However, the government officially admitted that the policy of raising the minimum wage to 10,000 won by 2020, which had been the initial target but which the government had been forced to forego, had also caused a great burden on self-employed businesses and deteriorated the job market. In addition, there are opinions from various media that the minimum wage law is not properly applied in Korea.

South Korea has special allowance which's called weekly paid allowance for all employees working more than 15 hours a week with perfect completion of employment a week

=== Spain ===
The Spanish government sets the "Interprofessional Minimum Wage" (SMI) annually, after consulting with the most representative trade unions and business associations, for both permanent and temporary workers, as well as for domestic employees. It takes into account the consumer price index, national average productivity, the increase in labor's share in national income, and the general economic situation.

In the years following Franco's death in 1975, the minimum wage gradually increased, reaching 50.49 euros (8,400 pesetas) that year, which is equivalent to 657.23 euros in today's currency. Over the years, the minimum wage continued to rise, with several revisions along the way. In 2022, the Spanish government set the minimum wage at 33.33 euros per day or 1,000 euros per month, effective from 1 January. This represents a 47% increase from the previous minimum wage set in 2018 at 735.90 euros.

For instance, an analysis conducted by BCE (Central Bank of Spain, by its initials in Spanish) in 2019 on the impact of the 2017 increase in the minimum wage showed a negative effect on the probability of maintaining employment among affected workers, which was particularly significant for older workers.

Additionally, the 2022 minimum wage raise reignited the debate over the relationship between inflation and the SMI, with some arguing that the increase could contribute to inflation. The debate centres on whether it is a useful tool for maintaining the purchasing power of those who retain their jobs, or whether it is ineffective because it adds pressure on price growth and increases the likelihood of inflation becoming entrenched.

== Minimum to median wage ratio ==
The Kaitz index, devised in 1970 and named after Hyman Kaitz, is an economic indicator represented by the ratio of the nominal legal minimum wage to median wage adjusted for the industry-level coverage.

Country	Minimum to median wage ratio in 2025	2025 minimum wages in U.S. dollars purchasing power parity
Colombia	0.91	4
Costa Rica	0.85	6
Chile	..	5
Mexico	0.75	3
New Zealand	0.64	15
France	0.63	16
United Kingdom	0.62	17
Romania	0.61	11
South Korea	0.60	11
Slovenia	0.59	12
Portugal	0.59	10
Poland	0.59	13
Luxembourg	0.56	18
Australia	0.55	17
Spain	0.55	15
Croatia	0.54	10
Bulgaria	0.53	8
Slovak Republic	0.52	8
Israel	0.51	9
Ireland	0.51	15
Germany	0.50	18
Greece	0.50	8
Lithuania	0.50	12
Canada	0.49	13
Belgium	0.48	16
Hungary	0.48	8
Netherlands	0.48	17
Turkey	0.47	8
Czech Republic	0.47	9
Japan	0.46	10
Latvia	0.45	8
Estonia	0.43	8
United States	0.24	7

== See also ==
- Average worker's wage
- Corporatism
- Cost of living
- Economic inequality
- Employee benefits
- Family wage
- Garcia v. San Antonio Metropolitan Transit Authority
- Labor law
- Living wage
- Minimum Wage Fixing Convention 1970
- Negative and positive rights
- List of countries by minimum wage
- Price controls
- Salary cap
- Scratch Beginnings
- Thomas Sowell
- Universal basic income
- Youth unemployment
- Walter E. Williams
- Working poor
