= Nickel and Dimed =

2001 book by Barbara Ehrenreich

- First edition
- Author: Barbara Ehrenreich
- Language: English
- Genre: Undercover journalism
- Publisher: Metropolitan Books
- Publication date: 2001
- Publication place: United States
- Media type: Print
- Pages: 224 pp
- Awards: Christopher Award
- ISBN: 0-8050-8838-5

Nickel and Dimed: On (Not) Getting By in America is a book written by Barbara Ehrenreich. Written from her perspective as an undercover journalist, it sets out to investigate the impact of the 1996 welfare reform act on the working poor in the United States.

The events related in the book took place between spring 1998 and summer 2000. The book was first published in 2001 by Metropolitan Books. It was expanded from an article she wrote from a January 1999 issue of Harper's Magazine. Ehrenreich later wrote a companion book, Bait and Switch, published September 2005, about her attempt to find a white-collar job.

In 2019, the book was ranked 13th on The Guardian's list of the 100 best books of the 21st century. In 2024, it was ranked 57th on The New York Times's list of the 100 best books of the 21st century.

== Social and economic issues ==
Ehrenreich investigates many of the difficulties low wage workers face, including the hidden costs involved in such necessities as shelter (the poor often have to spend much more on daily hotel costs than they would pay to rent an apartment if they could afford the security deposit and first-and-last month fees) and food. For example, the poor have to buy food that is both more expensive and less healthy than they would eat if they had access to refrigeration and appliances needed to cook.

Foremost, Ehrenreich attacks the notion that low-wage jobs require only unskilled labor. A journalist with a Ph.D. in cell biology, she found that manual labor required highly demanding feats of stamina, focus, memory, quick thinking, and fast learning. Constant and repeated movement creates a risk of repetitive stress injury. Pain must often be worked through to hold a job in a market with constant turnover. The days are filled with degrading and uninteresting tasks, e.g. toilet-cleaning and mopping.

She details several individuals in management roles who served mainly to interfere with worker productivity, to force employees to undertake pointless tasks, and to make the entire low-wage work experience even more miserable. She describes her managers changing her shift schedule from week to week without notifying her.

Ehrenreich describes personality tests, questionnaires designed to weed out incompatible potential employees, and urine drug tests, increasingly common in the low wage market, arguing that they deter potential applicants and violate liberties while having little tangible positive effect on work performance. She comments that she believes they are a way for an employer to relay to an employee what is expected of them conduct-wise.

She argues that 'help needed' signs do not necessarily indicate a job opening. More often their purpose is to sustain a pool of applicants in fields that have notorious rapid turnover of employees. She posits that one low-wage job is often not enough to support one person, let alone a family. With inflating housing prices and stagnant wages, this practice increasingly becomes difficult to maintain. Many of the workers encountered in the book survive by living with relatives or other persons in the same position, or even in their vehicles.

Ehrenreich concludes with the argument that all low-wage workers, recipients of government or charitable services like welfare, food, and health care, are not simply living off the generosity of others. Instead, she suggests, we live off their generosity:

When someone works for less pay than she can live on ... she has made a great sacrifice for you ... The "working poor" ... are in fact the major philanthropists of our society. They neglect their own children so that the children of others will be cared for; they live in substandard housing so that other homes will be shiny and perfect; they endure privation so that inflation will be low and stock prices high. To be a member of the working poor is to be an anonymous donor, a nameless benefactor, to everyone.

— Nickel and Dimed, p. 221

The author concludes that someday, low-wage workers will rise up and demand to be treated fairly, and when that day comes everyone will be better off.

== The goal ==
Barbara Ehrenreich states in her book that her goal is to "see whether or not I could match income to expenses, as the truly poor attempt to do every day."

== Reception ==
According to the American Library Association, Nickel and Dimed was the 39th most frequently challenged book in the country from 2010-2019.

== Adaptations ==
Ehrenreich makes an appearance in the documentary The American Ruling Class in 2007. She portrays her life undercover working as a waitress and is accompanied by a musical rendition titled "Nickeled and Dimed".

== See also ==
- Maid: Hard Work, Low Pay and a Mother's Will to Survive (2019) by Stephanie Land, featuring an introduction written by Barbara Ehrenreich
- Hand to Mouth: Living in Bootstrap America (2014), the debut book by Linda Tirado, a memoir about poverty in the United States
- Scratch Beginnings: Me, $25, and the Search for the American Dream by Adam Shepard conceived as a refutation
- Moral Mazes
- Occupy Wall Street
- Undercover Boss
