= Cadre management in the Soviet Union =

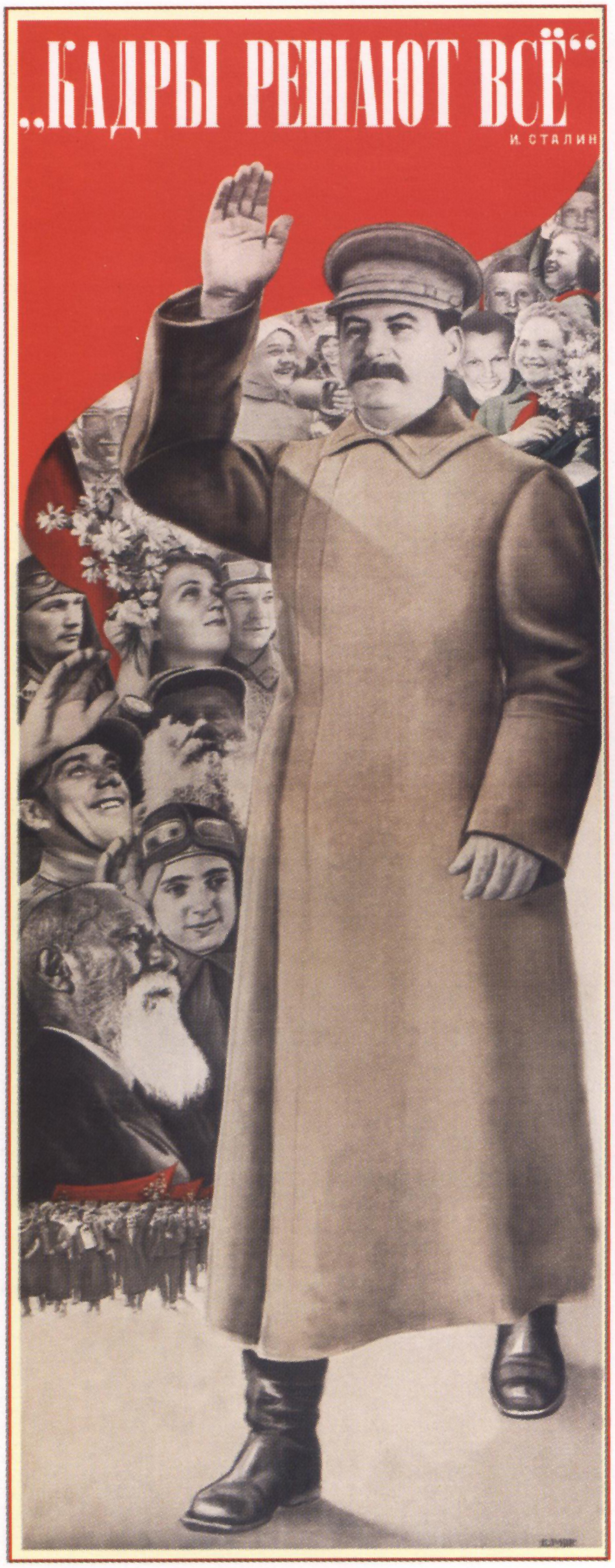
A 1935 poster with Stalin's slogan "Cadres decide everything!"

In modern Russian, the word "cadre" is synonymous with the term human resources. (Note: For example, the common Russian term "cadre department" is synonymous to "human resources department") In the history of the Soviet Union and the history of the Communist Party of the Soviet Union, particular emphasis was placed on the assignment of the managerial cadre known as upravlentsy (управленцы) in Soviet parlance, who, with the exception of the lower levels of bureaucracy, were supposed to be members of the Communist Party, and the management of the cadre of the Party itself. Over time this evolved into the system of nomenklatura encompassing managerial positions across the entire state.

== Cadre of the Communist Party of the Soviet Union ==
Over time, the cadre of the Russian Communist Party and the Communist Party of the Soviet Union were managed by special departments: Uchraspred of the Central Committee of the Russian Communist Party (1919-1924), Orgraspred, Orgburo, and Sekretariat.

== Bureaucracy in other spheres ==
During the initial years, the Soviet governmental bureaucracy was not predominantly Bolshevik. Moreover, in the state declared to be based on the dictatorship of the proletariat, only 2.4% of the staff of central state agencies were former workers in 1922.

== See also ==
- Apparatchik
- Cadre system of the Chinese Communist Party
- Nomenklatura
