= Scratch Beginnings =

Book by Adam Shepard

Scratch Beginnings: Me, $25, and the Search for the American Dream
- Author: Adam Shepard
- Publication date: 2007

Scratch Beginnings: Me, $25, and the Search for the American Dream is a book by Adam Shepard, a graduate of Merrimack College, about his attempt to live the American Dream. It was conceived as a refutation of the books Nickel and Dimed and Bait and Switch by Barbara Ehrenreich.

== Background ==
While Shepard states that his story is not politically motivated, he did intend it to be a rebuttal to Barbara Ehrenreich's books Nickel and Dimed and Bait and Switch on a socio-economic level. He writes, "Ehrenreich attempted to establish that working stiffs are doomed to live in the same disgraceful conditions forever ... my story is a search to evaluate if hard work and discipline provide any payoff whatsoever or if they are, as Ehrenreich suggests, futile pursuits." In achievement of his goal, Shepard resolved not to use his college education, credit history, or any of his previous contacts to help himself. Additionally, he would not beg for money or use services that were not available to others.

== Social issues ==
Along the way, Shepard explores controversial premises, such as:

- Why the book Nickel and Dimed was flawed from the beginning.
- Why raising the minimum wage does not stimulate the economy of the lower class.
- Why immigration and job outsourcing are not the causes of decreasing opportunity in the American workforce.
- How certain individuals are profiting from the consumer's fear of the death of the American Dream.

== Final outcome ==
A February 11, 2008, article about the book in The Christian Science Monitor states, "During his first 70 days in Charleston, Shepard lived in a shelter and received food stamps. He also made new friends, finding work as a day laborer, which led to a steady job with a moving company. Ten months into the experiment, he decided to quit after learning of an illness in his family. But by then he had moved into an apartment, bought a pickup truck, and had saved around $5,300."

In retrospect, he finds that bias is a real issue for jobseekers. For example, in a February 16, 2008 interview on NPR, Shepard related some advice he got from someone: "You know, I was sitting there, and I was not really happy that I had passed out 50 applications, and nobody was getting back to me, and he just went nuts, and he said listen, Adam, you are a homeless dude. Nobody looks at your application—you know because I had my homeless shelter as my address—nobody looks at that and says hey, yeah, I want to hire Adam Shepard, the homeless guy."

== Promotions and appearances ==
The book created great interest with the author Adam Shepard appearing in the Today Show, CNN, Fox News, and NPR as well as The Dave Ramsey Show and ABC program 20/20. His book was featured in many publications, notably The New York Times, New York Post, The Atlantic, The Christian Science Monitor amongst others. Scratch Beginnings was used in curriculums or suggested reading material in tens of American and international universities, colleges and schools and translated into other languages.

== Adam Shepard ==
The author Adam Shepard is a graduate of Merrimack College in North Andover, Massachusetts, where he studied with a basketball scholarship. He graduated with a degree in Business Management and Spanish.

After the success of Scratch Beginnings published by HarperCollins, he authored another book with the publishing house, The Best Four Years – full title The Best Four Years: How to Survive and Thrive in College (and Life) – about the years one spends in college based on his own experiences on how to make the most of the college experience from orientation to graduation.

After working as a bartender in North Carolina, he collected enough money to engage on a one-year world tour in 2011–2012 that took him to seventeen countries on four continents. He recounted his experiences in a book titled One Year Lived.

He also created a series of courses under the title Next Level Success.

On April 10, 2017, he released American Dream: A Documentary that chronicles in film footage his experiences when he is taken to a random American city and given $25 to survive for a month.

== See also ==
- George Orwell, Down and Out in Paris and London
- Polly Toynbee, Hard Work: Life in Low-Pay Britain
- Jack London, The People of the Abyss
- Jacob Riis, How the Other Half Lives
