= Family wage =

Sufficient pay to support a family

A family wage is a wage that is sufficient to raise a family. This contrasts with a living wage, which is generally taken to mean a wage sufficient for a single individual to live on, but not necessarily sufficient to also support a family.

== History ==
=== United States ===
Charles Krauthammer has said there should be a two-tiered system where breadwinners have a higher minimum wage.

=== Israel ===
A family wage – a basic wage, with a supplement by family size, was adopted by the dominant trade union in the British Mandate of Palestine (now the state of Israel), Histadrut, in 1923, and remained policy for a decade, but implementation was limited.

=== United Kingdom ===
In the United Kingdom, a family wage was a demand of male labour unionists at the turn of the 19th century.

== Family wage model ==
Family wage model is often described as the income dynamic between the husband or wife. For most of history, a typical family is one where the male earns the income to support his family. The female oftentimes performs domestic duties to support the family, such caring for their children. The female and children are dependant on the male figure to provide them sufficient finances and resources. This model is outdated due to more women entering the labor force and earning their own income.

== See also ==
- Employee benefits
- Employment discrimination
- Entitlement
- Family economics
- Guaranteed minimum income
- Household income
- Income distribution
- Labour law
- Living wage
- Maximum wage
- Minimum wage
- Wage slavery
- Wage theft
- Wages and salaries
- Welfare
- Working poor
