= Partmaximum =

Maximum wage allowed to Soviet Communist Party members

Partmaximum (Russian: партмаксимум) was a limit on the salary of a member of the Communist Party in the Soviet Union, a maximum wage. Partmaximum was introduced in 1920 by a decree of the All-Russian Central Executive Committee (ВЦИК) for all communists that held executive positions in Party, industry, government and Soviet trade unions. Their salary was not supposed to exceed that of a highly qualified industrial worker. If a communist had other incomes, e.g., honoraria or royalties, he had to transfer a specified percentage from the amount above the partmaximum into the Party funds.

Partmaximum was cancelled by a secret resolution of the Politburo of February 8, 1932; however, it was bypassed with benefits in kind even earlier. This cancellation is thought to mark the onset of the formation of the privileged nomenklatura class of Soviet apparatchiks, whose well-being no longer depended on the well-being of subordinated workers.
