= President for One Day (disambiguation) =

President for One Day may refer to:

- David Rice Atchison, a 19th-century United States Senator perhaps best known for the claim that he unknowingly served as Acting President of the United States from the end of the Presidency of James K. Polk on March 4, 1849 to the Inauguration of Zachary Taylor on March 5, 1849. This claim is dismissed by most scholars, as it fringes on the fact that Taylor delayed his inauguration ceremony to March 5. Despite this delay, Taylor legally became President on March 4.
- Clímaco Calderón, who served as President of Colombia on 21 December 1882
- Pedro Lascuráin, who served as President of Mexico for less than one hour on 19 February 1913

== See also ==
- King for a Day (disambiguation)
