= King for a Day =

King for a Day may refer to:

== Film and television ==
- King for a Day (1933 film), a Bollywood film starring Begum Akhtar
- King for a Day (1934 film), a 1934 short film starring tap dancer Bill "Bojangles" Robinson
- King for a Day (1940 film), a 1940 cartoon short in Max Fleischer's Gabby series
- King for a Day (1983 film), a Bulgarian film starring Todor Kolev
- "King for a Day" (Hercules: The Legendary Journeys), a 1996 episode of Hercules: The Legendary Journeys
- "King for a Day" (Joe 90), an episode of Joe 90
- "King for a Day" (Mia and Me), an episode of Mia and Me
- "King for a Day", a two-part episode of Power Rangers: Zeo
- Kings for a Day, a 1997 French film
- Tiny Tim: King for a Day, a 2020 Swedish film

== Music ==
- "King for a Day" (Thompson Twins song), 1985
- "King for a Day" (XTC song), 1989
- "King for a Day" (Jamiroquai song)
- "King for a Day" (Pierce the Veil song), 2012
- "King for a Day", a song by Battle Beast from the album Bringer of Pain
- "King for a Day", a song by Faith No More from the album King for a Day... Fool for a Lifetime
- "King for a Day", a song by Forever the Sickest Kids from Forever the Sickest Kids
- "King for a Day", a song by Goldfinger from Goldfinger
- "King for a Day", a song by Green Day from Nimrod
- "King for a Day", a song by Primal Fear from Delivering the Black
- "King for a Day", a song by Unisonic from Unisonic
- "King for a Day", a song from the musical The Real Ambassadors
- King for a Day, an album by Bobby Conn
- King for a Day, a tribute album by Micky Dolenz containing covers of songs written by Carole King
- King for a Day, a CD by Jason Wilber

== See also ==
- Un giorno di regno, an 1840 opera by Giuseppe Verdi
- Queen for a Day, an American radio and television game show
- President for One Day (disambiguation)
