= Cadre (politics) =

Person or group recognized as capable and militant within a political organization

In political contexts, a cadre (/ˈkɑːdrə/, also UK: /ˈkɑːdə/, also US: /ˈkɑːdreɪ/) consists of persons who function as leaders within a political organization. In some socialist states, a cadre is a group of people trained to carry out the goals of the party-state and to disseminate and enforce official ideology. These groups aim to stimulate loyalty by mobilizing citizens and by encouraging ideological and policy consensus. Cadres can be deployed in the field or employed in central offices by a political party, by the state, or by the secret police. They are often formed in order to break apart existing class hierarchies among citizens of a party-state. Such cadres have operated in a number of different countries: for example in the Soviet Union (1922 to 1991) and in Ethiopia during the Derg (1974 to 1987). As of 2025 the People's Republic of China maintains a cadre system.

== Cadre political parties ==
Byrd and Bradbury analyse the origins of cadre political parties within Western democracies:

Party organization in Western democracies was originally characterized by two principal types. Cadre parties developed as an expression of a small elite group. In the nineteenth century these were generally parties made up of social notables and their individual supporters. [...] Such cadre parties were generally loosely organized, had low memberships, and were not ideologically programmatic. Most conservative and right of centre parties evolved in this manner. In contrast, mass parties grew out of the development of late nineteenth-century working-class protest and the political ambitions of trade unions, friendly societies, and cooperative movements.

== Revolutionary socialist usage ==
For revolutionary socialists including Leninists, a cadre is a group of committed, active, and experienced intellectuals who share political beliefs and participate in the revolutionary movements they see the most promise in. The term can also refer to a member of said group.

Cadres decide everything!

— Joseph Stalin

== China ==
The Chinese Communist Party (CCP) maintains a system to train, organize, appoint, and oversee personnel to fulfill a wide range of civil service roles in party, state, military, business, and other organizations across the People's Republic of China. The system is composed of the several million full-time, professional staff.

The People's Republic of China is a one-party state under the CCP. The management of cadres is one of the key ways in which the leadership of the CCP controls Chinese society and disciplines the state and the party itself. Personnel must keep allegiance to the CCP and not develop any competing loyalties. To this end, the CCP enforces tight restrictions on the freedom of cadres to affiliate themselves with any other organizations, movements, ideologies, or activities or to practice any form of religion (although this last rule is sometimes not fully applied or can be partly evaded under certain circumstances). Cadres are not always official members of the party, but most of them are, and those who are not are usually limited to much more technical or specialist roles than their party-member colleagues, with little or no involvement in explicitly political matters. Cadres are trained to be not only competent and dependable administrators but also unwaveringly faithful to the party line and to the pursuit of socialism with Chinese characteristics.

== Romania ==
The Socialist Republic of Romania was an example of the use of cadres in communism, and an exploration of their role in Romania can give an overall picture of the importance of cadres.

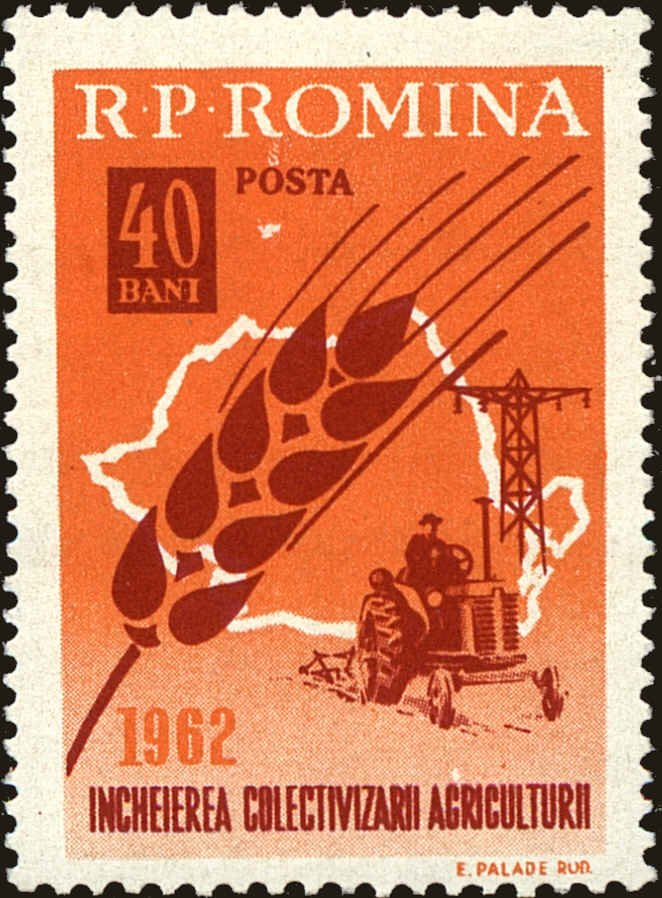
A Romanian stamp that reads, "Concluding the Collectivization of Agriculture."

Cadres were vital to spreading the ideology of Marxism–Leninism in Romania because cadres were the medium through which official party ideology was transmitted between countries. A cadre can and has been used by more countries than just Russia; their primary role makes them indispensable in ideology shift among a population. They functioned in two fashions throughout Romania (in particular), first to spread the communist ideology throughout the country and monitor communism's opinions among the rural populations to ensure that the Romanians viewed communism popularly. Collectivization relied on cadres to keep the system in order. However, due to the shortage of cadres, massive government surveillance and inconsistent policies produced an environment full of distrust and abuse. As a result, the cadre system consumed itself as frustration, distrust, and violence increased. These operational struggles were made worse by the fact that the cadres already had their work cut out for them due to the relative difficulty the party experienced in spreading their ideological base. The Romanian Communists attempted to execute a top-down conversion of their citizenry to communism, as opposed to a grassroots-style upheaval that was the case in Russia. This led to a situation where the workers and operatives they needed to most enthusiastically buy in were some of their strongest opposition most of the time. The state saw its operatives increasingly turn inwards and ensure their own well-being, frequently at the cost of other members of the party. There were even instances where the members would incriminate other cadres behaving the same way in the attempt to secure their own position and welfare within the party.

=== Collectivization in Romania ===
Collectivization was a system, first implemented in the Soviet Union, of taking land from peasants for government use, and then redistributing this land into large, government run farms. This worked to a degree in the USSR. However, in Romania this system was met with much more opposition and a lack of support from the general population. The cadres in Romania, at least at the beginning, were of a rather small number, so one of the most important cadres was an agitator, whose job was to go around from village to village trying to "whip up support" for the new party.

Cadre is a very general term, and refers to many positions within the communist bureaucracy. In addition to agitators, cadres were also responsible for the logistical aspects of collectivization, such as collecting quotas and getting people to join the collectives, as well as policing the state and making sure citizens were "good communists". To help with doing so, cadres were responsible for neutralizing the social and economic power of wealthier peasants. They often abused their positions, either by using force to complete their objectives or by using their position for political gain. As the Romanian Communist Party (RCP) grew in Romania, the main tasks of the cadres shifted from focusing on the collectivization of agriculture to stirring up class warfare and separating the communist "enemies" from the "good communists."

=== Reasons for collectivization ===
In establishing the RCP, many characteristics of the Soviet model were imitated as groundwork for the party. Because the RCP was politically weak, it required significant assistance from the Soviet Union. As a result, the RCP had many Soviet advisors within its bureaucracy, and based much of its structure on the Soviet blueprint.

Collectivization also provided a seemingly easy way to unite the masses under a single umbrella of social, political, economic control as well as limit individuality. Ultimately, this served as a tool to enforce subordination under the RCP.

Another key goal of the RCP was to initiate widespread intellectual reform. Such reform is mostly intangible and can thus be much more difficult to implement. As a result, by collectivizing land, the state could have greater control over class resources and exert greater overall control over every member within those classes. With such control, intellectual reform becomes much easier.

Collectivization was also an excellent way to create and subsequently destroy a class structure, especially when none already existed. For many communist countries, the Soviet Union's "extensive experience in collectivizing agriculture" served as their guiding light and provided the basic script. "Its central ingredient ... was the demonization of the wealthy peasants." Class war and collectivization went hand in hand.

=== Who was a cadre? ===
A cadre was "anyone directly employed by the Party-state in an official capacity". Their work included serving as "the apparatuses of Party, state, or Securitate at any level of the political hierarchy". Cadres were considered to be from "healthy" or "unhealthy" origins. A cadre from healthy origins was a poorer peasant, while a cadre from unhealthy origins was a wealthier peasant. Cadres from healthy origins, ironically, had more issues with literacy and less managerial experience, but they were still preferred over cadres from unhealthy origins. Cadres who came from either origin could have still been stigmatized by their local community, which could have compromised their effectiveness in the field. Among the cadres, there were issues of illiteracy, lack of respect from their community, and a lack of commitment to the full ideology of communism. The state frequently encountered difficulties ensuring that cadres were acting in the way they wanted them to, oftentimes cadres would end up abusing the power they were delegated by the state or would end up shirking the responsibilities altogether.

=== Recruitment problems ===
Initially, there was a shortage of labor supply from the cadres. Even though the population of cadres was not small, they were not able to work efficiently as most of them are uneducated. Thus, the RCP required its cadres to engage more propaganda and persuade others to become cadres. This led the RCP to a dilemma: it did not have enough labor, but the process of persuasion demanded labor, so that the RCP ran into a further shortage. Later on, there was a variety of problems related to the recruitment of cadres. One issue was finding people who were qualified; the majority of the "healthy" population was illiterate and impoverished, and therefore had limited productivity to accomplish many assigned tasks. Similarly, the work that the cadres were expected to do was held to a high standard, and people did not want to work in a job with such high pressure. Additionally, the people who were qualified were often the educated "chiaburs" (wealthy peasants) who were later labelled as "enemies" by the party, so they were also unqualified. Another issue was the negative perception of cadres in society. Because the job came with many negative connotations, many people did not want to become cadres and be ostracized by their local community. Moreover, while the RCP was always trying to find and set up its "enemies", it also had a desire to purge them. Hence, this action makes even fewer people eligible to work as cadres (i.e. not party enemies). This created shortage of qualified cadres, and some of them began to use leadership methods that may not have aligned with their behavioral code.

=== Signs of bad cadres ===
While cadres encompassed a large swath of the population and various segments of people, all were expected to abide by a certain behavioral code. While the following signs of "bad" cadres seem broad, it is important to understand that the Romanian Communist Party was very strict in its surveillance and punishment of cadres in the efforts to root out class enemies and disloyal employees to the state.

Drinking, and other similar fraternization behavior among the cadres was frowned upon by the RCP. Drinking and alcoholism could open up the cadres to bribery and undermine their ability to enforce quotas and collectivization. Similarly, any horizontal exchanges were deemed unacceptable by the RCP due to the vertically integrated state structure. This included sexual solicitation and theft. Cadres were also expected to uphold family values by remaining monogamous and refraining from divorce. Finally, cadres were discouraged from using excessive violence/force when not necessary because it violated the RCP's doctrine of "free consent."

== Cadre policies in states ==
A cadre policy as a political mechanism may take one of two forms:

1. Cadre deployment: the appointment by a government's governing party of a loyalist to an institution, as a means of enhancing public reporting-lines and ensuring that the institution stays true to the mandate of the party as elected by voters. It involves the creation of a comprehensive power-structure, so that functionaries implement the policies of the party as mandated by the public. In turn, that party advances the interests of the public.
2. Cadre employment: a process through which political parties in a democracy give effect to their policies and objectives by preferring functionaries who subscribe to the same values.

Under cadre policies, every level of government is steered by loyalists to the developmental and redress policies of the governing party. The African National Congress government in South Africa commonly practises cadre deployment to ensure that societal leaders actively implement redress policies. Together with Black Economic Empowerment policies, cadre policy is intended to address the inequities brought on by the former apartheid system in South Africa. However, in 2021 the Zondo Commission of inquiry into the State capture of South Africa by corrupt interests found that cadre deployment was a significant channel for diverting and looting public funds.

== See also ==
- Cadre management in the Soviet Union
