= Moral Mazes =

1988 book by Robert Jackall

Moral Mazes: The World of Corporate Managers
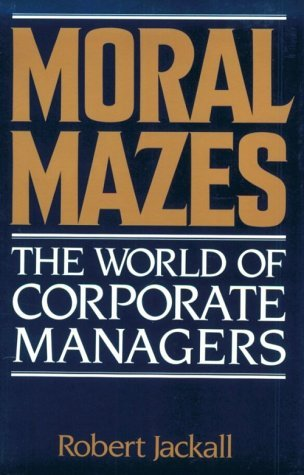
- Author: Robert Jackall
- Language: English
- Genre: Business, Business ethics, Non-fiction
- Publisher: Oxford University Press
- Publication date: 1988
- Publication place: United States
- Media type: Print (Hardback & Paperback)
- Pages: 294 p. (paperback edition)
- ISBN: 978-0199729883 (paperback 20th anniversary edition)

Moral Mazes: The World of Corporate Managers is a 1988 book by sociologist Robert Jackall that investigates the world of corporate managers in the United States.

In the introduction, Jackall writes that he "went into these organizations to study how bureaucracy—the prevailing organizational form of our society—shapes moral consciousness" and that the book is "an interpretive sociological account of how managers think the world works."

It was named the "Most Outstanding Business and Management Book" of 1988 by the Association of American Publishers.

== Summary ==
Moral Mazes is based on several years of fieldwork during which the author conducted interviews with managers in several large corporations in the early 1980s.

From these interviews, the book describes the social construction of reality within large corporations in the United States. The book argues that bureaucracy in large American corporations:

"regularizes people's experiences of time and indeed routinizes their lives by engaging them on a daily basis in rational, socially approved, purposive action; it brings them into daily proximity with and subordination to authority, creating in the process upward-looking stances that have decisive social and psychological consequences; it places a premium on a functionally rational, pragmatic habit of mind that seeks specific goals; and it creates subtle measures of prestige and an elaborate status hierarchy that, in addition to fostering an intense competition for status, also makes the rules, procedures, social contexts, and protocol of an organization paramount psychological and behavioral guides."

Perhaps the most important finding is that successful managers are dexterous symbol manipulators. Successful managers provide a public face and may be categorized as providing emotional labor as one of their major activities. They must be able to work well with others and to sublimate their emotional and psychological needs to the demands of others. The very ambiguity of their work and its assessment leads to the feeling on the part of the managers that "instead of ability, talent, and dedicated service to an organization, politics, adroit talk, luck, connections, and self-promotion are the real sorters of people into sheep and goats".

== Structure ==
The book begins with historical context. It shows how the organizational structure of American business changed in the 19th century. The author explains the creation of large corporations in the context of how the Industrial Revolution changed American industry. These changes demanded a professional management class. This new class then changed the organizational culture of American business, emphasizing decisions centered on money-based measures such as profit and loss (see also rational choice theory).

The book then describes the results of the author's interviews. The author's research included interviews with managers at various levels of the organizations. These unnamed organizations are large and medium-sized companies. The qualitative data collected by the interviews cover approximately four years, beginning in 1980, documenting changes in management within the corporations, business decisions, and the effect of those changes and decisions on the managers.

== Popularity among Hacktivists ==
Moral Mazes was one of the "very favorite books" of hacktivist Aaron Swartz, making it an influential book within that community. Peter Ludlow, a writer on hacktivist culture, used the world of Moral Mazes to explain the actions of Edward Snowden.

== See also ==
- Parkinson's Law
- Peter Principle
- Dilbert
