= Bait and Switch (book) =

2005 book by Barbara Ehrenreich

- First edition
- Author: Barbara Ehrenreich
- Publisher: Metropolitan Books
- Publication date: United States; 2005
- Pages: 256pp.
- ISBN: 1429915706

Bait and Switch: The (Futile) Pursuit of the American Dream is a 2005 book by Barbara Ehrenreich. The book follows Ehrenreich's examination of the world of insecure low-wage work that constituted Nickel and Dimed, published in 2001. In this case, she decided to pseudonymously penetrate the corporate world instead and then write about the way in which things operate in reality in a similar manner to her earlier book (in this case adopting her maiden name as a cover). She embarked upon a quest to try to get a job in public relations.

However, after ten months of effort (including hiring a career coach, attending careers fairs, networking with job seekers and signing up for an employment 'boot camp') Ehrenreich was unable to find a job, receiving only two offers of commission-based sales work in cosmetics and car insurance. Neither position offered enough money to land her in the middle class socio-economic bracket. In the meantime, she enters a world involving a blizzard of management-speak that she finds utterly objectionable, involving terms such as "takeaway," "skill set," "due diligence" and "in real time."

Ehrenreich's discussion, therefore, focuses on the instability of life at a middle or white-collar stratum of the employment world, particularly in the case of the long 'transition' periods when people lose one particular job and attempt to attain another. Her initial goal was to get a job that paid on the order of $50,000 with health insurance, but had to revise this as a result of the difficulties that she faced getting a job. The difficulty of finding a position was in part the product of the reality of the wider jobs market: at the time of writing, she argued that 44% of the long-term unemployed are people who can be categorized as white-collar professionals, showing the extent of the insecurity that is now endemic to much of the sector.

Implicitly she is critical of much of the motivational industry that has flourished in the face of employment insecurity and instability; on one character assessment she is described, rather superficially and vacuously, as 'Original and Effective' and on another as 'the commandant'. Throughout this process, she concludes, she is being asked to undergo a form of depersonalization. Moreover, she is critical of the notion that one loses a job or finds it hard to find one because of some internal failing, instead placing the emphasis on the difficulties and challenges of the external reality. Her hope is that future solutions lie in updated forms of collective action that protect employees from the vicissitudes and volatility of the employment world.
