= Nomenklatura =

High bureaucrats/ruling class in Eastern Bloc countries

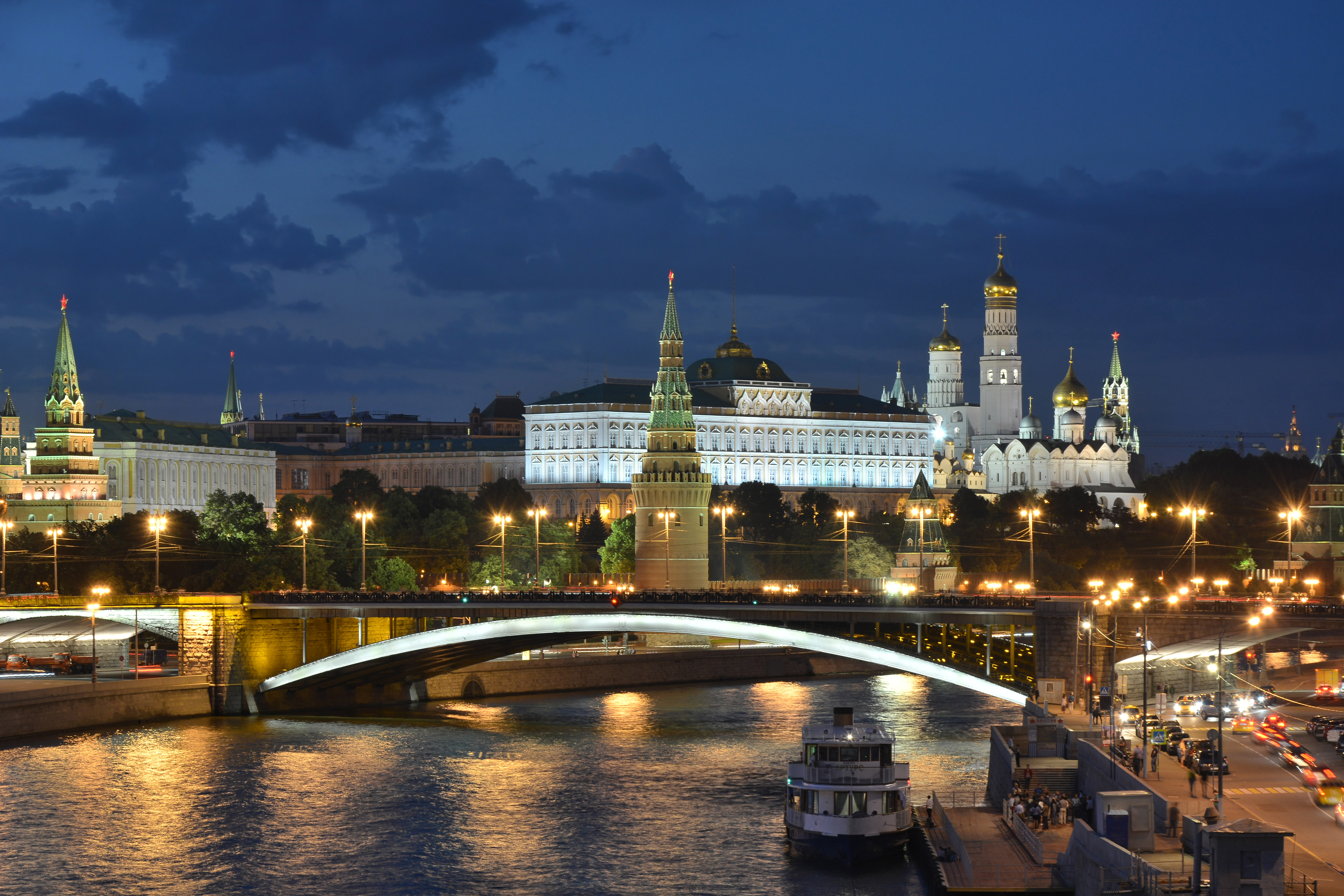
Moscow Kremlin, where the highest of the elite Soviet nomenklatura lived

The nomenklatura (Russian: номенклату́ра; from Latin: nomenclatura, system of names) were an elite category of people within the Soviet Union and other Eastern Bloc countries who held various key administrative positions in the bureaucracy, running all spheres of those countries' activity: government, industry, agriculture, education, etc., whose positions were granted only with approval by the communist party of each country or region. While in the Russian language the term номенклатура has the same generic meaning as "nomenclature", in the context of the politics of the Soviet Union it refers to the "party and state nomenklatura", lists of persons vetted for key management, or "nomenklatura lists".

== Description ==
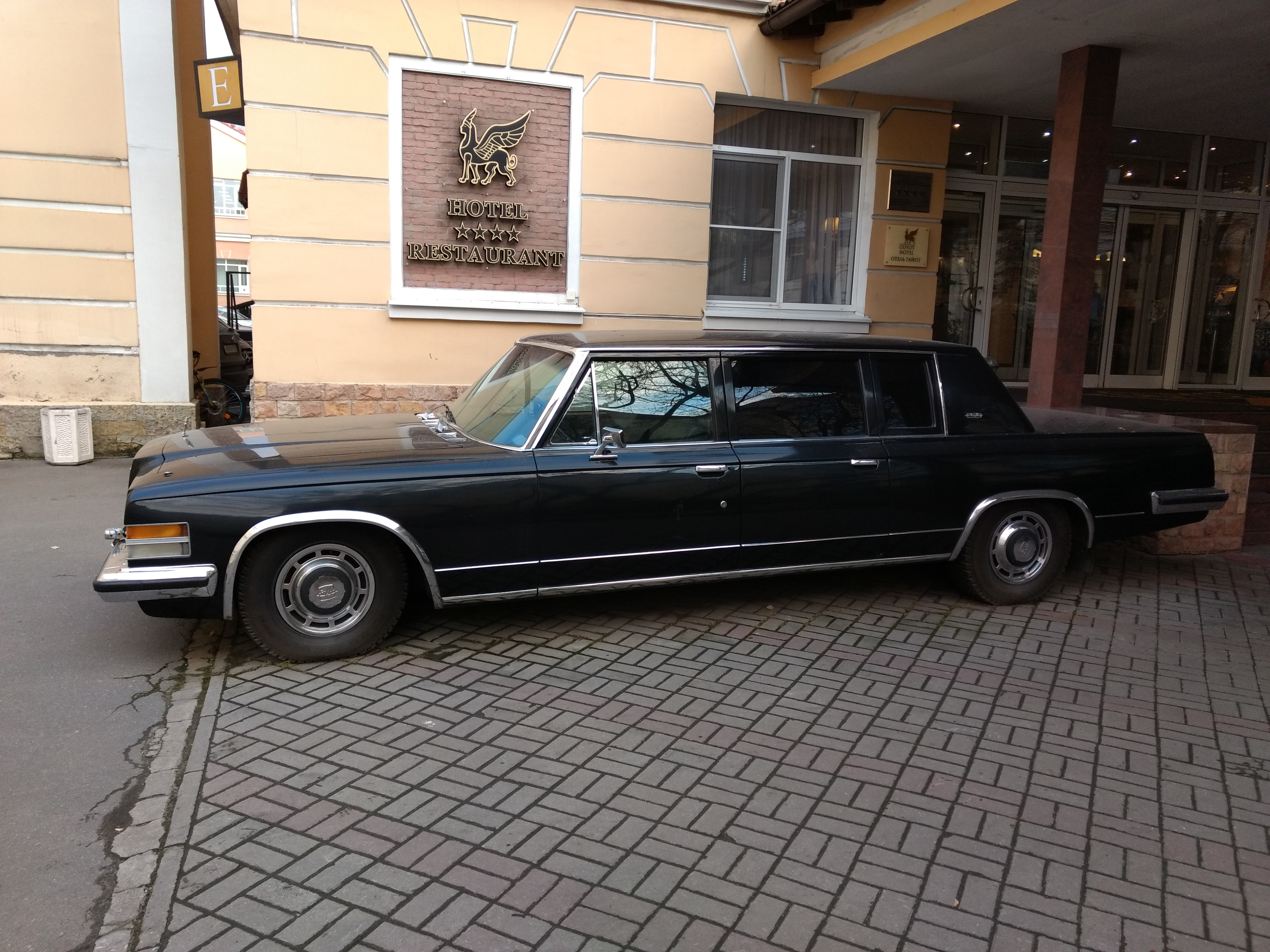
A black limousine made by ZiL was a status symbol of top Soviet nomenklatura, popularly known as chlenovoz (Note: Chlenovoz ("membermobile") is a derisive pun, because in Russian the word "член" is also a euphemism for "penis" (a truncation of the full term "половой член", "male sexual organ")) ("membermobile")

Virtually all members of the nomenklatura were members of a communist party. Yugoslav politician Milovan Đilas, a critic of Stalin, wrote of the nomenklatura as the "new class" in his book The New Class: An Analysis of the Communist System, and he claimed that it was seen by ordinary citizens as a bureaucratic elite that enjoyed special privileges and had supplanted the earlier wealthy capitalist elites. Richard Pipes, a Harvard historian, claimed that the nomenklatura system mainly reflected a continuation of the old Tsarist regime, as many former Tsarist officials or "careerists" joined the Bolshevik government during and after the Russian Civil War of 1917–1922.

The nomenklatura formed a de facto elite of public powers in the former Eastern Bloc; one may compare them to the Western establishment holding or controlling both private and public powers (for example, in media, finance, trade, industry, the state and institutions).

Individuals with a nomenklatura background have continued to dominate economic and political life in Russia since the end of the Cold War. According to one 2022 estimate, 60% of elites in the Vladimir Putin administration had nomenklatura backgrounds.

The nomenklatura referred to the Communist Party's governance to make appointments to key positions throughout the governmental system, as well as throughout the party's own hierarchy. Specifically, the nomenklatura consisted of two separate lists: one was for key positions, appointments to which were made by authorities within the party; the other was for persons who were potential candidates for appointment to those positions. The Politburo, as part of its nomenklatura authority, maintained a list of ministerial and ambassadorial positions that it had the power to fill, as well as a separate list of potential candidates to occupy those positions.

The nomenklatura system arose early in Soviet history. Vladimir Lenin wrote that appointments were to take the following criteria into account: reliability, political attitude, qualifications, and administrative ability. Joseph Stalin, who was the first general secretary of the party, was also known as "Comrade File Cabinet" (Tovarishch Kartotekov) for his assiduous attention to the details of the party's appointments. Seeking to make appointments in a more systematic fashion, Stalin built the party's patronage system and used it to distribute his clients throughout the party bureaucracy.

In 1922, Lenin allied with Leon Trotsky against the party's growing bureaucratisation and the influence of Joseph Stalin. Under Stalin's direction in 1922, the party created departments of the Central Committee and other organs at lower levels that were responsible for the registration and appointment of party officials. Known as uchraspred, these organs supervised appointments to important party posts. According to American Sovietologist Seweryn Bialer, after Leonid Brezhnev's accession to power in October 1964, the party considerably expanded its appointment authority. However, in the late 1980s, some official statements indicated that the party intended to reduce its appointment authority, particularly in the area of economic management, in line with Mikhail Gorbachev's reform efforts.

At the all-union level, the Party Building and Cadre Work Department supervised party nomenklatura appointments. This department maintained records on party members throughout the country, made appointments to positions on the all-union level, and approved nomenklatura appointments on the lower levels of the hierarchy. The head of this department sometimes was a member of the Secretariat and was often a protégé of the general secretary.

Every party committee and party organizational department, from the all-union level in Moscow to the district and city levels, prepared two lists according to their needs. The basic list (osnovnoi spisok) detailed positions in the political, administrative, economic, military, cultural, and educational bureaucracies that the committee and its department had responsibility for filling. The registration list (uchyotny spisok) enumerated the persons suitable for these positions.

== China's nomenklatura ==
China adopted the nomenklatura system from the Soviet Union in the 1960s and is still using this system of governance to this day. According to scholar Hon Chan, it establishes China's "party and governmental leadership" and is a "key instrument of Communist Party control." For China, it is not just the party that nomenklatura has control over but "the government, judicial system, schools, and universities, enterprises, research establishments, religious organizations, museums, libraries, hospitals" are all things that fall under the domain as well. Despite there being "elected" officials, "all positions of real importance fall under the CCP’s nomenklatura." The cadres higher up on the political ladder were able to control those under them. John Burns, a scholar of China's nomenklatura, highlights the different classes inside the party. Level "A" is the highest level of cadres, including heads of party central departments. Level "B" consisted of the lesser ranked officials. In 1983, a plan was presented to decentralize the control that personnel management had. The authorities suggested to halve the number of cadres from 13,000 to 7,000. The Central Committee, who previously had control over the majority of posts, was drastically reduced in its areas of management. It had previously controlled all high-level appointments and ensured party control over critical positions in government. The aim of this reform was to redistribute power to the lower levels and to make personnel management more efficient. Since 1984, the Central Committee's control over appointments has been divided into two lists:

1. The "Job Title List of Cadres Managed by the Party Central Committee", including about 5,000 senior positions requiring Central Committee approval for appointments and removals.
2. The "List of Cadre Positions to be Reported to the Party Central Committee", including tens of thousands of slightly lower-level positions that must be reported to the Central Committee.

== See also ==
- Apparatchik
- Bolibourgeoisie
- Bureaucratic collectivism
- Cadre management in the Soviet Union
- Criticism of communist states
- New Soviet man
- Partmaximum
- The Revolution Betrayed, includes analysis of the Soviet bureaucracy by Leon Trotsky
- Vydvizhenets
