= Apparatchik =

Term for a Soviet communist bureaucrat

An apparatchik (Russian: аппаратчик) was a full-time, professional functionary of the Communist Party of the Soviet Union or the Soviet government apparat (аппарат, apparatus), someone who held any position of bureaucratic or political responsibility, except for the higher ranks of management called nomenklatura. James Billington describes an apparatchik as "a man not of grand plans, but of a hundred carefully executed details." The term is often considered derogatory, with negative connotations in terms of the quality, competence, and attitude of a person thus described.

Members of the apparat (apparatchiks or apparatchiki) were frequently transferred between different areas of responsibility, usually with little or no actual training for their new areas of responsibility. Thus, the term apparatchik, or "agent of the apparatus" was usually the best possible description of the person's profession and occupation. Many officials became apparatchiks only in middle age. They were known to receive various benefits including free holiday vouchers, free meals and accommodation.

== Extended meanings ==
According to Collins English Dictionary the word can mean "an official or bureaucrat in any organization". Robert Shea elaborates on the ability of apparatchiks to be "extraordinarily good at manipulating- organizations to serve their own ends". According to Douglas Harper's Online Etymology Dictionary, the term was also used in the meaning "Communist agent or spy", originating in the writings of Arthur Koestler, c. 1941.

== See also ==
- Cadre (politics)
- Clientelism
- Jobsworth
- New class
- Partmaximum
- Cadre management in the Soviet Union
