= List of countries by GDP per capita growth =

List of countries by GDP per capita growth may refer to one of two articles:

- List of countries by GDP (real) per capita growth rate, which only measures the nominal dollar figure after correcting for inflation, or
- List of countries by GDP (PPP) per capita growth rate, which adjusts it for the price level in the country.
