= List of countries by minimum wage =

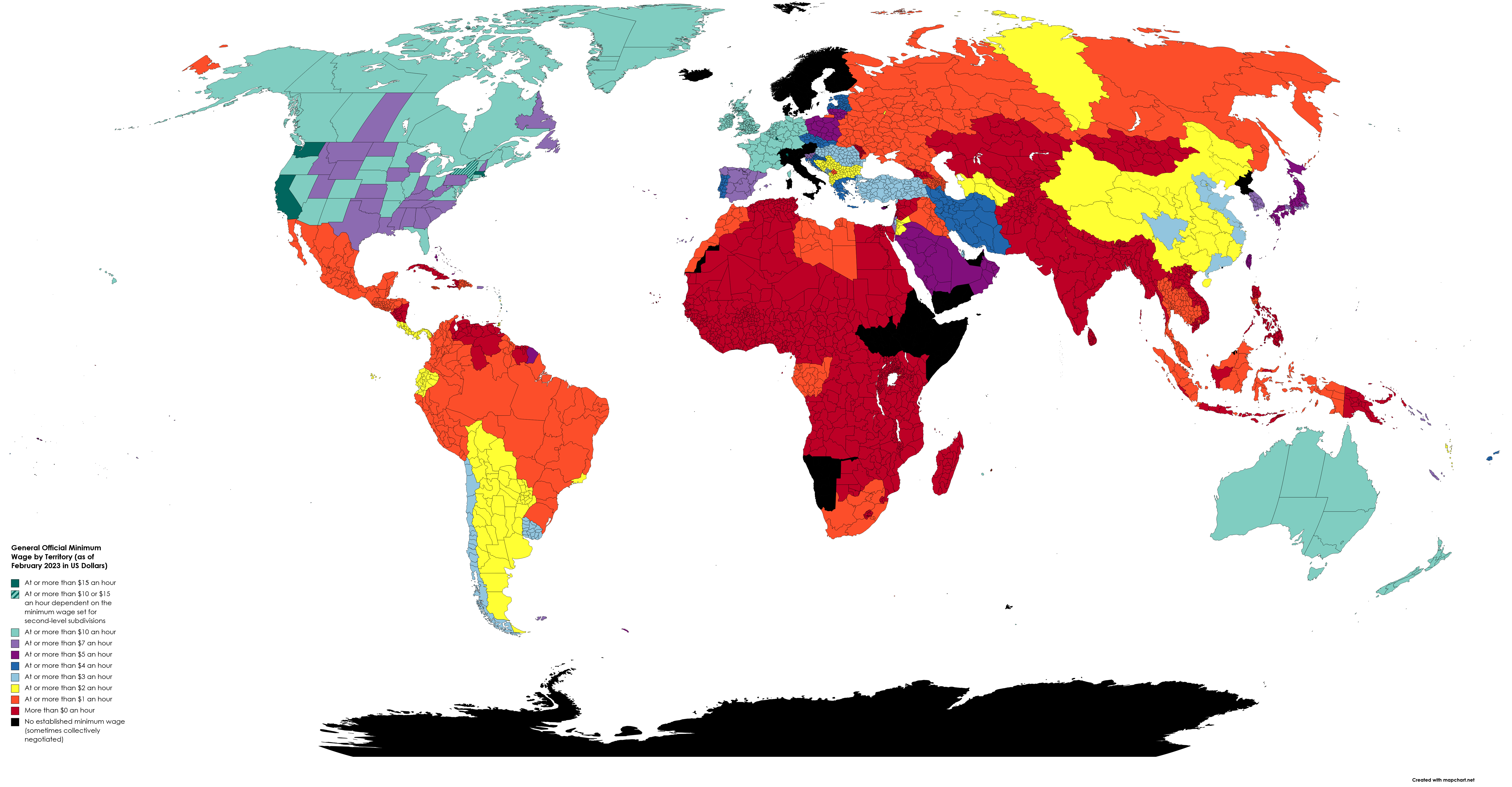
General minimum wage by territory, as of February 2023

This is a list of the official minimum wage rates of the 193 United Nations member states and former members of the United Nations, also including the following territories and states with limited recognition (Northern Cyprus, Kosovo, etc.) and other independent countries. Some countries may have a very complicated minimum wage system; for example, India has more than 1202 minimum wage rates for different types of industries and skill levels. Meanwhile, other countries may have a national rate which often is superseded by state, provincial, cantonal, county and city minimum wage rates. For example, 33 states in the United States have higher minimum wages than the federal rate (plus military rates on federal bases) – on top of this an additional 42 city-level subdivisions having different minimum wage rates and 53 countries. In effect, the United States has over 100 different minimum wages across the nation. This is common in federalist nations such as Canada, and minimum wage in China also has numerous different rates. In the table below, only the lowest minimum wage is cited, or the highest-level subdivision where it applies.

== Methodology ==
The minimum wages listed refer to a gross amount, that is before deduction of taxes and social security contributions, which vary from one country to another. Also excluded from calculations are regulated paid days off, including public holidays, sick pay, annual leave and social insurance contributions paid by the employer.

For comparison, an annual wage column is provided in international dollars, a hypothetical unit of currency calculated based on the purchasing power parity (PPP) of household final consumption expenditure. For calculating the annual wage, the lowest general minimum wage was used.

== List ==
Minimum wages by country or region. USD and Int$ PPP.
Country&Region	Notes	Annual		Work week (hours)	Hourly		% of GDP per capita	Effective date
Country&Region	Notes	Nominal (US$)	PPP (Int$)	Work week (hours)	Nominal (US$)	PPP (Int$)	% of GDP per capita	Effective date
Afghanistan	؋5,500 (US$70) per month for non-permanent private sector (Afs. 66,000 per annum). The minimum wage for permanent government workers was ؋6,000 (US$76.3) per month (Afs. 72,000 per annum). There was no minimum wage for permanent workers in the private sector.	858		40	0.41			2017
Albania	L50,000 (US$610) per month (600,000 lek per annum). The law establishes a 40-hour workweek, but the actual workweek is typically set by individual or collective-bargaining agreement.	4,637	10,187	40	2.23	4.9	88.3%	1 Jan 2026
Algeria	د.ج 24,000 (US$185.05) per month, DA 138.46 per hourly, nationally (DA 288,000 per annum).	2,132	6,900	40	1.03	3.32	46%	1 January 2026
Andorra	€7.7 (US$8.33) hourly.	18,253	13,493	40	8	6	28%	1 Jan 2023
Angola	Kz 32,181 (US$61) per month; paid thirteen times a year (Kz. 418,353 per annum)	663	1,149	44	0.29	0.5	17.8%	2022
Antigua and Barbuda	EC$8.2 per hour (US$3.03).	6,317	7,783	40	3.04	3.74	34.3%	1 Nov 2014
Armenia	֏ 75,000 (US$190) per month.	1,787	5,677	40	0.86	2.73	64.3%	15 Nov 2022
Australia	Most workers are covered by an award, which may vary by employee age, geographical location and industry. Workers receive mandatory employer loadings such as penalty rates or leave loading. Minimum wages are set federally by the Fair Work Commission. For those 21 and older, not covered by an award or other instrument, (as of July 1, 2024) - the minimum wage is $A 915.90 (US$622.17) per week, or $A 24.10 (US$16.37) per hour. Casual workers are paid a loading of typically 25%, resulting in a minimum of A$28 (US$18) per hour for those workers. Workers under 21, apprentices and trainees not covered by an award, have minimum wages set at a percentage of the ordinary rate. For those under 16, this is 36.8% or A$7.87 (US$5.25) per hour; $A 9.83 (US$6.56) with the casual loading.	35,810	32,519	38	18.12	16.46	70.7%	1 July 2024
Austria	None: National collective bargaining agreements set minimum wages by job classification for each industry and provide for a minimum wage of €1,200 (US$1354) per month. Wages where no such collective agreements exist, such as for domestic workers, janitorial staff and au pairs, are regulated by relevant legislation and are generally lower than those covered by collective bargaining. The national minimum wage legislation has lapsed, although is still in force by convention.			40				2017
Azerbaijan	₼345 (US$203) per month.	2,435	7,625	40	1.17	3.67	44.2%	5 Jan 2023
The Bahamas	B$5.25 (US$5.25) per hour, B$42 (US$42) per day, and B$210 (US$210) per week.	10,920		40	5.25			15 Aug 2015
Bahrain	None; .د.ب 300 (US$800) for the public sector workers (only applies to Bahraini nationals).			48				2017
Bangladesh	৳1,500 (US$13) per month for all economic sectors not covered by industry-specific wages; in the garment industry the minimum wage raised to ৳8,000 (US$67) per month since 1 Dec 2018, rising to ৳12,500 (US$106.40) per month on 1 Dec 2023. The minimum wage is set nationally every five years by the National Minimum Wage Board in a tripartite forum industry by industry.	212	515	48	0.08	0.21	14.4%	1 Dec 2013
Barbados	Bds$ 10.5 (US$5.25) per hour for general minimum wage rates. Bds$ 11.43 (US$5.71) per hour for security guards.	10,920		40	5.25			1 June 2025
Belarus	Br 554 (US$122) per month.	0	7,834	40	0	3.77	43.4%	1 Jan 2023
Belgium	€2,029.88 (US$2291) per month.	28,809	31,562	38	14.58	15.97	68%	1 April 2024
Belize	BZ$5 (US$2.48) per hour.	5,850	10,757	45	2.5	4.6	127.1%	22 July 2022
Benin	CFA 52,000 (US$86.12) per month; the government set minimum wage scales for a number of occupations.	865	2,447	40	0.42	1.18	112.9%	1 Jan 2023
Bhutan	Nu. 3,750 per month.	609	2,138	40	0.29	1.03	24%	1 Feb 2014
Bolivia	Bs. 2,500 (US$362) per month. plus an obligatory Christmas bonus equal to one month's pay, prorated for the amount of time the worker has worked in their present position. Plus a second Christmas Bonus if the government decries the economy grew enough, plus an extra month paid in May if the company made a profit for the previous year.	4,703	12,040	48	1.88	4.82	166.4%	1 May 2024
Bosnia and Herzegovina	KM 543 (US$269) net per month.	3,949	8,473	40	1.9	4.07	69.6%	2022
Botswana	P 7.34 (US$0.62) an hour for most full-time labour in the private sector; P 1,786 (US$152) per month.	1,933	4,036	48	0.77	1.62	23.8%	2022
Brazil	R$1,621 per month (US$291.78), paid 13 times a year. The Brazilian minimum wage is adjusted annually by the federal government, but each Brazilian state has the option to either follow the national minimum wage or to set its own minimum wage, which cannot be lower than the federal minimum wage. In 2022, five states (RS, SC, PR, SP and RJ) decided to stick with the latter option in order to have higher state minimum wages.	3,768	8,163	44	1.65	3.57	54%	1 Jan 2026
Brunei	None							2017
Bulgaria	лв. 1,077 (€550) per month, лв. 6.49 (€3.32) per hour.	8,181	32,558	40	3.93	15.65	169.2%	1 Jan 2025
Burkina Faso	CFA 34,664 (US$59) per month.	750	2,154	40	0.36	1.04	121.6%	1 Apr 2012
Burundi	None; in the past the government set the minimum wage, but during the year the minimum wage was set by market forces.			40				2017
Cambodia	៛ 818,800 (US$200) per month, for the textile and shoe industries.			48				3 Oct 2023
Cameroon	CFA 36,270 (US$62) per month.	785	2,082	40	0.38	1	57.7%	30 July 2014
Canada	The minimum wage in Canada is set federally and by each province and territory; ranges from CA$13 to CA$16 (US$9.69 to US$11.93) per hour. The minimum wage calculated here is a weighted average based on the relative population in each province.	24,128	23,927	40	11.6	11.5	53.4%	1 June 2022
Cape Verde	13.000$00 (US$141) per month.	1,673		44	0.73			1 Jan 2018
Central African Republic	FCFA 35,000 per month, FCFA 218.75 per hour.	821	1,757	40	0.39	0.84	251.4%	2011
Chad	FCFA 59,995 (US$110) per month, FCFA 355 (US$0.60) per hour.	1,298	3,232	39	0.64	1.59	162.3%	18 Oct 2011
Chile	CL$529,000 (US$553 per month for workers aged 18–65; or CL$394,622 (US$412) per month for workers younger than 18 and older than 65; and CL$340,988 (US$356) per month for 'non remunerative' purposes.	8,364	13,038	42	3.83	5.97	56.2%	1 May 2025
China	The minimum wage in China is set locally; ranges from CN¥ 1,620 (US$222.75) per month, or CN¥ 16.1 (US$2.21) per hour in Guangdong(Lowest Region); to CN¥ 2,690 (US$369.88) per month, or CN¥ 24 (US$3.30) per hour in Shanghai.	3,014	5,619	40	1.45	2.7	36.2%	1 Jan 2025
Colombia	COL$1,423,500 + COL$200,000 by transportation subsidy (US$350) per month	5,638	12,671	48	2.26	5.08	89.5%	1 Jan 2025
Comoros	CF 55,000 (US$129) per month.	1,587	2,601	40	0.76	1.25	170.9%	2017
Democratic Republic of the Congo	FC 1,680 (US$1.83) per day.	220		45	0.09			1 Jan 2009
Republic of the Congo	FCFA 90,000 (US$170) per month in the formal sector.	1,948		40	0.94			2017
Costa Rica	Varies for specified industries from ₡11,953.65 (US$23.21) per 8-hour work day for all workers to ₡15,613.91 (US$30.32) per day for specialized workers. All other occupations not explicitly covered fall under the generic scale, which varies from ₡358,609.5 (US$696.42) per month for unskilled workers to ₡765,985.67 (US$1,487.54) per month for licentiates.	6,932	13,681	48	2.78	5.48	82.4%	1 Jan 2024
Côte d'Ivoire	Varies by occupation, with the lowest set to CFA 60,000 (US$120) per month for the industrial sector; a slightly higher minimum wage rate is applied for construction workers.	792		40	0.38			2013
Croatia	€840 (US$900) per month.	1,585	19,356	40	0.76	9.31	82.6%	1 Jan 2024
Cuba	$MN2,100 (US$6.66) per month. Each citizen is however also given free food to supplement the salary.	44	669	48	0.44	0.74	0.4%	2021
Cyprus	None; €870 (US$1,006) per month for shop assistants, nurses' assistants, clerks, hairdressers, and nursery assistants; it rises to €924 (US$1,069) after six months' employment. For asylum seekers working as unskilled workers in the agricultural sector, the minimum monthly wage was €425 (US$570) with accommodation and food provided. For skilled workers in the agricultural sector, the minimum salary was €767 (US$1,040) without accommodation and food.			48				2017
Czech Republic	Czech Republic monthly gross minimum wage is 22,400 Kč (US$1051), that's 134.40 Kč (US$6.31) per hour. The net wage after tax comes off to 19,012 Kč, (US$892.21).	9,959		40	4.79			1 Jan 2026
Denmark	None; instead, negotiated between unions and employer associations; the average minimum wage for all private and public sector collective bargaining agreements was approximately kr. 110 (nominally US$16) per hour, exclusive of pension benefits.			37.5				2017
Djibouti	None; cancelled by the 2006 Labor Code for occupational categories, establishing that wages be set after common agreement between employers and employees. For public sector workers, minimum wage was Fdj35,000 (US$198) per month.			48				2017
Dominica	EC$4 (US$1.50) per hour.	3,081	5,340	40	1.48	2.57	48.8%	1 June 2008
Dominican Republic	RD$8,310 (US$166) per month in the FTZs and between RD$9,412 (US$188) and RD$15,448 (US$309) outside the FTZs, depending upon the size of the company; RD$5,884 (US$117) per month for the public sector; RD$320 (US$6) a day for farm workers who are covered by minimum wage regulations based on a 10-hour day, with the exception of sugarcane workers who received RD$146 based on an eight-hour workday.	2,613	6,279	44	1.14	2.74	41.3%	2021
Ecuador	US$594 per month (including mandatory 13th and 14th salaries, minimal 15 days vacation period per year and mandatory reserve funds after one year of continuous work). The minimum wage set by the government for 2025 is $470 per month without social benefits. Workers receive mandatory 13th and 14th salaries, paid vacations and reserve funds equal to an additional salary after one year of continuous work.	7,124	16,136	40	3.43	7.76	143.5%	1 Jan 2025
Egypt	None; The minimum wage of public sector is LE 6,000 (US$118.4) per month. The private sector (There are certain grace periods in certain industries such as tourism, retail, and clothing.) is LE 7,000 (US$138.1) per month.			42				1 Mar 2025
El Salvador	The minimum wage was set by the government at US$304.17 monthly in 2018.	3,650	7,785	44	1.6	3.4	90.3%	1 Jan 2018
Equatorial Guinea	FCFA 129,035 (US$224) per month.	2,792		48	1.12			2017
Eritrea	None; Nfk 360 (US$23.3) per month in the public sector.			44.5				2017
Estonia	€725 (US$818) per month, or €4.30 (US$4.85) per hour.	10,578	13,315	40	5.09	6.4	44.8%	1 Jan 2023
Eswatini	E 531.6 (US$76.50) per month for a domestic worker; E 420 (US$60.50) a month for an unskilled worker; E 600 (US$86.50) a month for a skilled worker.	694	1,128	48	0.33	0.54	19%	2011
Ethiopia	None; some government institutions and public enterprises set their own minimum wages: public sector employees, the largest group of wage earners, earned a monthly minimum wage of Br 420 (US$21); employees in the banking and insurance sector had a minimum monthly wage of Br 336 (US$18).			48				2017
Federated States of Micronesia	None; US$2.65 per hour for employment with the national government; all states have a minimum hourly wage for government workers: US$2.00 in Pohnpei, US$1.25 in Chuuk, US$1.42 in Kosrae, and US$1.60 in Yap; US$1.75 for private sector workers in Pohnpei.			40				2015
Fiji	FJ$2.68 per hour.	4,823	11,225	48	1.93	4.5	123.2%	December 2024
Finland	None; however, the law requires all employers, including non-unionized ones, to pay minimum wages agreed to in collective bargaining agreements; almost all workers are covered under such arrangements.			40				2017
France	The monthly minimum wage in France is 1801€, that is, 11.88€ per hour.	25,572	29,518	35	14.05	16.22	71.4%	1 Jan 2025
Gabon	FCFA 150,000 (US$255) per month; government workers received an additional monthly allowance of FCFA 20,000 (US$34) per child; government workers also received transportation, housing, and family benefits; the law does not mandate housing or family benefits for private sector workers.	3,246	6,409	40	1.56	3.08	35.4%	1 Feb 2010
The Gambia	D 50 (US$1.25) per day.	253		48	0.1			2017
Georgia	₾1,000 (US$400) per month	93	276	40	0.04	0.13	2.8%	2017
Germany	The monthly minimum wage in Germany is 2891.20€ that is based on 48 hours workweek at 13.90€ per hour.	41,033	48,262	48	16.44	19.34	98.8%	1 Jan 2026
Ghana	₵18.19 (US$1.2) per day.	814	901	40	0.39	0.43	21%	1 Jan 2024
Greece	€1027 (US$1159) per month in 12 payments, €880 (US$993) per month in 14 payments.	13,738	20,026	40	6.6	9.63	74.8%	1 Apr 2025
Grenada	Minimum wage schedules set pay by occupation; for example, the minimum wage for domestic workers, for example, was EC$4.5 per hour, while that for a security guard was EC$8 per hour.			40				2017
Guatemala	Q 81.87 (US$10.9) per day for agricultural and nonagricultural work and Q 74.89 (US$10) per day for work in export-sector regime factories. Minimum wage earners also are due a mandatory monthly bonus of Q 250 (US$33), and salaried workers receive two mandatory yearly bonuses (the bono 14 and the Christmas bonus), each equivalent to one month's salary.	3,924	8,838	48	1.57	3.54	111.2%	1 Jan 2016
Guernsey	£12.60 per hour (US$16.90) for those aged 18+ £11.35 per hour (US$15.20) for those aged 16–17.							1 Oct 2025
Guinea	The labor code allows the government to set a minimum hourly wage; however, the government has not exercised this provision except for setting the minimum wage for domestic workers at FG 440,000 (US$62) per month.			48				2017
Guinea-Bissau	CFA 19,030 (US$30) per month plus a bag of rice	412	1,016	45	0.18	0.43	63.1%	2017
Guyana	GY$35,000 (US$168) per month, or GY$1,616 (US$7) per day, or GY$202 (US$1) per hour.	2,015	4,296	40	0.97	2.07	54.8%	1 July 2013
Haiti	G 290 per day for servants for an eight-hour workday; G 400 per day for segment A industries; G 350 per day for segment B industries; G 290 per day for segment C industries; G 350 per day for companies with piece work that re-export; and G 350 per day for companies with piece work that exports.	1,014	678	48	0.41	0.27	38%	1 Aug 2017
Honduras	Minimum wages ranged from a low of L 8,134.08 per month, L 50.83 per hour to L 16,856.24 per month, L 105.35 per hour.	4,842	9,218	44	2.12	4.03	194.6%	1 Jan 2024
Hong Kong	HK$42.1 (US$5.4) per hour is the minimum wage in Hong Kong.	11,270		40	5.42			1 May 2025
Hungary	232,000 Ft (US$765) per month for unskilled labor, 296,400 Ft (US$978) per month for skilled labor.	9,184	13,611	40	4.42	6.54	51%	1 Jan 2023
Iceland	Unlike the other Scandinavian countries, minimum wages are negotiated in various collectively bargained agreements and applied automatically to all employees in those occupations, regardless of union membership; while the agreements can be either industry- or sector-wide, and in some cases firm-specific, the minimum wage levels are occupation-specific.			40	17.45			3 Dec 2022 (conversion rate, 1 Sep 2023)
India	Though stipulated by law, it varies from ₹160 (US$1.66) per day in Bihar, to ₹348/day (US$3.6) in Mumbai (2017), to ₹750 (US$8) per day in Kerala. State governments set a separate minimum wage for agricultural workers. The minimum wages are set according to Minimum Wages Act, 1948.	517	2,516	48	0.21	1.01	38.3%	2015
Indonesia	Established by provincial and district authorities, which vary by province, district, and sector; the lowest minimum wage is in the province of Yogyakarta at Rp 1,704,608 (US$121) per month and the highest is in Jakarta at Rp 4,276,349 (US$303) per month.	2,449	6,917	40	1.18	3.33	59.6%	1 Feb 2020
Iran	7,308,284 tomans (equal to ﷼94,661,840), and to US$145 as of 2024) per month effective on the 2024 Persian New year (﷼1,135,942,080 per annum); set annually for each industrial sector and region. The standard workweek is 44 hours, and any work over 48 entitles the worker to overtime.	1,747		44	0.76			20 Mar 2024
Iraq	د.ع 250,000 (US$214) per month.	2,069	5,495	40	0.99	2.64	31.7%	2014
Ireland	€14.15 (US$15.1) per hour, with sub-minimal rates for those aged 19 €12.74 (90% minimum), aged 18 €11.32 (80% minimum) and for those under the age of 18 €9.91 (70% of minimum) Eurostat calculates the monthly rate for Ireland as (hourly rate x 39 hours x 52 weeks) / 12 months.	37,801	35,357	39	18.64	17.43	49.5%	1 Jan 2025
Isle of Man	£8.25 stg per hour (US$10.18) for those aged 18+ £6.15 per hour (US$7.59) for those aged under 18 £7.30 per hour (US$9.01) for development workers.							1 Oct 2019
Israel	₪6,443.85 ILS (US$1995) per month; or ₪35.40 ILS (US$10.96) per hour.	23,940	21,152	42	10.96	9.68	56.8%	1 Apr 2026
Italy	None; instead set generally through collective bargaining agreements on a sector-by-sector basis.			40				2019
Jamaica	J$325 (US$2) per hour. J$52,000 (US$343) per month	4,461	6,881	40	2.14	3.31	78%	1 Apr 2023
Japan	Ranges from ¥1,023–¥1,226 per hour (US$6.70-US$8.03); varies on a prefectural and industry basis.	13,440	20,591	40	6.46	9.9	48.7%	31 Mar 2026
Jersey	£8.32 stg per hour (US$10.27) for those aged 18+ £7.28 stg per hour (US$8.99) for trainees year 2. £6.02 stg per hour (US$7.43) for trainees year 1.							1 Apr 2020
Jordan	minimum wage 290 JOD ($409) per month	5,408	12,065	48	2.17	4.83	133.3%	1 Jan 2025
Kiribati	$A 1.30 per hour for local businesses and companies, while the minimum wage for overseas-funded projects is $A 3.00 an hour	2,033		40	0.98			1 Nov 2016
North Korea	Averaging ₩5,000 – 10,000 (US$5.5 – US$11.1) per day.							2014
South Korea	₩9,620 (US$7.29 as of 2 Feb 2023) per hour is the nominal minimum wage in South Korea.	20,990		40	10.09			1 Jan 2023
Kosovo	€170 (US$224) per month for workers between 35 and 65 years of age; €130 (US$150) for workers under 35 years of age.	2,413		40	1.16			17 Aug 2011
Kuwait	د.ك 60 (US$216) per month.	2,400	3,930	48	0.96	1.57	5.3%	14 Apr 2010
Kyrgyzstan	KGS 2,460 (US$28) per month, nominally; used for administrative purposes. Will be raised to 2,865 som in 2025.	349		40	0.17			1 Jan 2024
Laos	₭800,000 (US$100) per month; additionally, employers were required to pay a ₭30,000 (US$3.74) meal allowance per day. The minimum wage for civil servants and state enterprise employees was last increased to ₭1,400,000 (US$170) per month.	1,732		48	0.69			2014
Latvia	€780 (US$1014) per month.	11,070	16,953	40	5.32	8.15	66.3%	1 Jan 2023
Lebanon	ل.ل 18,000,000 (US$200) per month, doubling the minimum wage of ل.ل 9,000,000 set the year before, on 18 Apr 2023.	5,373	139	48	2.15	0.06	1%	1 Apr 2024
Lesotho	M 1,178 (US$102) per month to M 1,285 (US$112) per month; varied by sector.	956	2,268	45	0.41	0.97	76.9%	2014
Liberia	L$15 (US$0.31) per hour not exceeding 8 hours per day, excluding benefits, for unskilled laborers; L$5,600 (US$114) per month for civil servants.	4	1,450	48	0	0.58	178.5%	2014
Libya	ل.د 450 (US$325) per month; the government heavily subsidizes rent and utilities.	1,169	3,013	40	0.56	1.45	51.9%	1 Mar 2011
Liechtenstein	None			48				2014
Lithuania	€1,153 (US$1301) per month, €7.05 (US$7.96) per hour for unskilled labor.	17,343	26,680	40	8.34	12.83	89.3%	1 Jan 2025
Luxembourg	€2,508.24 (US$2831) per month, €14.50 (US$16.37) per hour for unskilled workers over 18; increased by 20% for a skilled employee; decreased by 20% to 25% in the case of an adolescent worker.	32,103	31,093	40	15.43	14.95	30.4%	1 Apr 2023
Macau	MOP$6,656 (US$833) per month.	9,972		40	4.79			1 Nov 2020
Madagascar	Ar 133,013.4 (US$30.82) per month, Ar 767.4. per hour for non-agricultural workers; Ar 134,920 (US$31.26) per month, 674.60 Ar. per hour for agricultural workers.	376	1,093	41	0.18	0.51	72.6%	1 Jan 2015
Malawi	K687.7(US$0.40) per day.	266	342	48	0.11	0.14	29.3%	1 Jan 2016
Malaysia	RM1,500 (US$336) per month.	4,928	14,259	45	2.11	6.09	51.5%	1 August 2025
Maldives	None; Rf. 3,100 (US$242) per month in the government sector.			48				2014
Mali	CFA 28,465 (US$57), supplemented by a required package of benefits, including social security and health care.	616	1,766	48	0.25	0.71	83.1%	2014
Malta	€792.3 (US$767) per month.	11,245	15,578	40	5.41	7.49	41.1%	1 Jan 2022
Marshall Islands	US$2 per hour for government and private sector employees.	4,160		40	2			6 Mar 1986
Mauritania	UM 25.962 (US$0.71) per hour for general minimum wage rates. UM 24.612 (US$0.67) per hour for the agriculture sector.	1,473	4,429	40	0.71	2.13	115%	2023
Mauritius	₨ 2,035 (US$56.77) per week for an unskilled worker in the Export Processing Zone(EPZ); ₨ 2,035 per week for an unskilled factory worker outside the EPZ plus a "salary compensation" of ₨ 90 per week; set by the government by sector, and increased each year based on the inflation rate. Both categories of workers also benefit from a "special allowance" from the revenue agency which means that all full-time workers in Mauritius earn a minimum wage of ₨ 2,250 (US$62.76) per week or ₨ 9,000 (US$251.05) per month	2,538	5,263	45	1.08	2.25	24.9%	2019
Mexico	Mex$278.8 (US$13.75) per day; Mex$419.88 (US$20.71) per day on the Free Zone of the Northern Border. Day off is paid according to Mexican labor legislation so the total amount of paid hours is 56 (Art. 69)	5,020	8,998	48	2.01	3.61	52.1%	2025
Moldova	L 4,000 (US$222) per month in the private sector.	2,715	5,471	40	1.31	2.63	102.6%	1 Jan 2023
Monaco	€1,779.82 (US$2009) per month, or €10.53 (US$11.88) per hour; same as the French minimum wage, plus a 5% adjustment.	24,092		39	11.88		17%	1 Jan 2019
Mongolia	₮792,000 (US$229) per month.	3,336	8,049	40	1.6	3.87	65.7%	1 Apr 2025
Montenegro	€450 (US$511) netto per month.	6,387	12,302	40	3.07	5.91	69.8%	1 Jan 2022
Morocco	3,500DH (US$349) per month in public sector, 3,111DH (US$310) per month in private sector, 84.37 Dh, (US$8.42) per day for agricultural workers.	3,997	9,076	44	1.75	3.97	115.5%	1 July 2015
Mozambique	Set for Eight different economic sectors; ranges from MT 4,941.68 (US$78) per month in the public sector, to MT 17,881.32 (US$281) per month in the financial sector.	906	2,326	40	0.44	1.12	191.1%	1 April 2024
Myanmar	K 3,600 per day, K 450 per hour.	691		44	0.3			1 Sep 2015
Namibia	None; the mining, construction, security and agricultural sectors set basic levels of pay through collective bargaining.			45				2014
Nauru	None; there is a graduated salary system for public service officers and employees, none for private-sector workers.			40				2014
Nepal	रू 19,550 (US$165.5) per month	1,986	6,651	48	0.8	2.66	268.4%	July 2025
Netherlands	€2,549.73 (US$2878) per month, and €14.71 (US$16.6) per hour for persons 21 and older; between 30–80% (as low as €4.41 per hour) of this amount for persons aged 15–20. An additional holiday allowance of 8% of the annual wage is paid in May or June, prorated for the time worked in the year.	36,187	39,874	40	17.4	19.17	78.9%	1 Jan 2026
New Zealand	$NZ 23.50 (US$14.23) per hour for workers 18 years old or older, and $NZ 18.80 (US$11.38) per hour for those aged 16 or 17 or in training; there is no statutory minimum wage for employees who are aged 15 years or under.	34,667	31,967	40	16.67	15.37	82.9%	1 Apr 2025
Nicaragua	Set for nine different economic sectors; ranges from C$5,721 (US$155) per month in the agricultural sector to C$12,803 (US$348) per month in the financial sector.	1,506	3,914	48	0.6	1.57	70.6%	1 Mar 2024
Niger	CFA 30,047 (US$60) per month.	650	1,807	40	0.31	0.87	183.2%	17 Aug 2012
Nigeria	₦70,000 per month (following the recent devaluation of the naira has fallen to US$44.28). However, workers who meet the following conditions are exempt from the minimum wage: Part-Time and Commission-Based Employees; Businesses with fewer than 25 employees; Seasonal Workers: Employees; Maritime and Aviation Employees; Domestic Workers	2,103	2,641	40	1.01	1.27	45.1%	1 May 2024
North Macedonia	ден 22,146, (US$406) gross per month.	2,418	5,627	40	1.16	2.71	37.7%	1 Apr 2021
Northern Cyprus	₺24,000. (US$795 as of 19 Jan)			40				1 Jan 2024
Norway	None; wages normally fall within a national scale negotiated by labor, employers, and local governments.			37.5				2014
Oman	ر.ع. 225 (US$592) per month plus allowances of ر.ع. 100 (US$263) per month for citizens; does not apply to foreign workers.	10,263	21,445	45	4.39	9.16	46.8%	1 July 2013
Pakistan	US$4.00 per day (1100 Pkr); does not include foreign workers ₨37,500 (US$230) per month.	2,762	6,881	48	1.11	2.76	131.4%	1 June 2026
Palau	US$3.00 per hour; does not include foreign workers.	6,240	6,478	40	3	3.11	39.7%	1 Oct 2014
Palestine	₪1,880 ILS (US$582) per month;	6,985		45	2.98			2022
Panama	B/.1.53 to B/.4.45 (US$1.53 – US$4.45) per hour, depending on region and sector. Food and the use of housing facilities were considered part of the salary for some workers, such as domestic and agricultural workers. Salaries for domestic workers ranged from B/.250 to B/.275 (US$250-US$275) per month. The agricultural and construction sectors received the lowest and highest minimum wages, respectively.	3,819	7,688	48	1.53	3.08	33.4%	1 Jan 2018
Papua New Guinea	K 3.2 (US$1) per hour.	2,086	2,651	44	0.91	1.16	63.4%	1 Aug 2014
Paraguay	2,798,309 ₲ (US$363) per month; The law discriminates against domestic workers, who are legally entitled to only 40 percent of the minimum wage. The law mandates that housing and food be counted towards domestic worker's salary.	4,957	11,682	48	1.99	4.68	122.1%	1 July 2024
Peru	S/.1,130 (US$318) per month.	3,495	7,037	48	1.4	2.82	54.1%	1 June 2022
Philippines	Ranges from ₱436 (US$6.91) daily non-agricultural wage in Bangsamoro to ₱755 (US$11.96) daily non-agricultural wage in Metro Manila.	3,986	9,560	40	1.92	4.6	122.5%	25 July 2026
Poland	4,806zł (US$1245) per month, or 31.4zł (US$8.13) per hour (for certain types of contracts) is the minimum wage in Poland.	14,941	27,953	40	7.18	13.44	102.1%	1 Jan 2026
Portugal	€956.66 per month (US$790) in 12 payments; €820 per month (US$677) in 14 payments for full-time workers, rural workers, and domestic employees ages 18 and older.	11,638	17,122	40	5.6	8.23	55.8%	1 Jan 2024
Qatar	Minimum wage in Qatar is 1,800 Qar, US$274 per month			48				2025
Romania	RON 4,050 (US$915) per month; else RON 24.55 (US$5.5) per hour for a full-time schedule of 165 hours per month is the minimum wage in Romania.	11,683	22,288	40	5.62	10.72	96.8%	1 Jan 2025
Russia	27,093₽ (US$346,32) (Federal, in some territories more, for example, 39,730₽ (US$507,86) in Moscow)	3,815		40	1.83			1 Jan 2026
Rwanda	None; ranges from FRw 500 to FRw 1,000 (US$0.83 to US$1.66) per day in the tea industry and FRw 1,500 to FRw 5,000 (US$2.50 to US$8.30) per day in the construction industry.			45				2013
Saint Kitts and Nevis	EC$9 per hour.	6,933		40	3.33			1 Nov 2014
Saint Lucia	Minimum wage for some sectors; EC$300 (US$111) per month for office clerks; EC$200 (US$74) for shop assistants; EC$160 (US$59) for messengers.			40				2013
Saint Vincent and the Grenadines	Set sector by sector; for example, EC$56 ($20.74) per day for agriculture workers (shelter not provided); EC$40 (US$14.81) per day for industrial workers; and EC$25 per day for household domestic workers.	2,407		40	1.16			1 July 2008
Samoa	WS$2 (US$0.89) per hour for the private sector; WS$2.65 (US$1.18) for the public sector.	1,625	2,211	40	0.78	1.06	34.7%	2012
San Marino	€1501.49 (US$1735) per month; or €9.24 (US$10) per hour for the lowest paying industry	21,310	24,481	37.5	10.93	12.55	40.2%	1 Jan 2017
São Tomé and Príncipe	None; Db: 3000,00 (US$145) per month for civil servants	1740						2025
Saudi Arabia	ر.س 4,000 (US$1066,66) per month for public sector; does not apply to foreign workers. There are no minimum wage in private sector.	12,800	25,653	48	5.13	10.28	47.1%	2 Feb 2013
Senegal	CFA 209.1 (US$0.42) per hour for general workers and CFA 182.95 (US$0.37) per hour for agricultural workers.	686	1,680	40	0.33	0.81	65.5%	1 Jan 1996
Serbia	din. 53,915 (460eu or $510) monthly.	3,610	6,780	40	1.74	3.26	46.7%	1 Jan 2022
Seychelles	SR 26/70 (US$1.9) per hour for all workers other than casual workers; SR 30/78 (US$2.1) per hour for casual workers.	3,282	6,572	40	1.58	3.16	23.2%	1 Jan 2014
Sierra Leone	Le 500,000 (US$57) per month.	575	866,347	40	0.28	416.51	58,687.7%	1 Jan 2015
Singapore	None. However, two exceptions: 1) Cleaner jobs to have a minimum wage of S$1,200 (US$860) per month effective July 2019. 2) Security guards to have a minimum wage of S$1,100 (US$802) per month effective Sep 2016.			44				2019
Slovakia	€700 (US$790) per month, or €4.03 (US$4.55) per hour.	9,914		40	4.77			1 Jan 2023
Slovenia	€1203.36 (US$1358) per month.	17,079	24,359	40	8.21	11.71	74.4%	1 Jan 2023
Solomon Islands	SI$4 (US$0.55) per hour for all workers except those in the fishing and agricultural sectors, who received SI$3.2 per hour.	933	979	45	0.4	0.42	43.8%	1 May 2008
Somalia	None.			48				2013
South Africa	R 30.23 (US$2.05) per hour for all workers, except for Expanded Public Works Programme workers who have a minimum of R 16.62 (US$1.12).	4,786	9,139	45	2.05	3.91	69.3%	1 Mar 2026
South Sudan	None.							2011
Spain	€1,260 (US$1388) per month in 12 payments, €1,080 (US$1219) per month in 14 payments.	17,457	24,282	40	8.39	11.67	66.9%	1 Jan 2023
Sri Lanka	රු.27,000 (US$89.70) per month.The minimum wages are set according to National Minimum Wage of Workers Act, No. 3 of 2016.	1,629	3,993	48	0.65	1.6	32.4%	1 April 2025
Sudan	ج.س. 425 (US$0.95 as of Aug 2021) per month. See Minimum wage in Sudan.	13		40	0.01			2013
Suriname	SR$52.47 (US$2.88) per hour.	5,983	6,983	40	2.88	3.36	46.7%	1 April 2025
Sweden	None; in Sweden the law provides for the right of workers to form and join independent unions to bargain wages collectively, and it prohibits antiunion discrimination.			40				2017
Switzerland	As of 2024, three cantons have official minimum salaries: CHF 20.6 (US$22.64) per hour in the canton of Jura; CHF 21.09 (US$23.18) per hour in the canton of Neuchâtel, CHF 24.32 (US$26.73) in the canton of Geneva; the rest of the country has no minimum wage. There are a minority of the voluntary General Labour Contracts (GLC, collective labour agreements), reached on a sector-by-sector basis, contain minimum compensation clauses, which provide for compensation ranging from CHF 2,200 to CHF 4,200 (US$2418 to US$4615) per month for unskilled workers and CHF 2,800 to CHF 5,300 (US$3077 to US$5824) per month for skilled employees. On 18 May 2014, Swiss voters rejected a federal initiative (by 76.3%) that would have enforced GLCs for every sector and set the hourly minimum wage at CHF 22 (US$24.18, or PPP-adjusted US$12.55).			41.7				2014
Syria	£S 12,560/= (US$105) per month}}	96	2,850	40	0.4	1.37	54%	2013
Taiwan	NT$ 29,500 (c.US$908) per month; NT$ 196 (US$6.06) per hour is the minimum wage in Taiwan.	11,973	23,432	40	5.76	11.27	33.7%	1 Jan 2026
Tajikistan		1,061		40	0.51			1 Sep 2025
Tanzania	Varies by sector from TSh 40,000/= (US$17) per month, to TSh 400,000/= (US$174) per month.	209	726	45	0.09	0.31	26%	1 July 2013
Thailand	Ranges from ฿328 to ฿354 (US$9.01–US$9.72) per day and up, depending on the cost of living in various provinces; set by provincial tripartite wage committees that sometimes include only employer representatives.	3,733	11,257	48	1.5	4.51	66.6%	1 Jan 2023
Timor-Leste	US$115 per month.	1,380	3,097	44	0.6	1.35	144.7%	22 June 2012
Togo	CFA 35,000 (US$70) per month.	757	1,923	40	0.36	0.92	129%	1 Jan 2012
Tonga	None			40				2013
Trinidad and Tobago	TT$15 (US$2.22) per hour; (US$53) per month	4,615	8,123	40	2.22	3.91	24.7%	1 Jan 2015
Tunisia	For the industrial sector: د.ت 465 (US$166) per month for a 48-hour workweek and د.ت 401 (US$143) per month for a 40‑hour workweek.	2,000	5,692	48	0.8	2.28	49.1%	2020
Tuvalu	None; the minimum annual salary in the public sector was approximately $A 3,000 to $A 4,000 (US$3,120 to US$4,160).							2013
Uganda	USh 130,000/= (US$34.58) per month.	426	1,167	40	0.2	0.56	64.1%	1 July 2017
Ukraine	₴8,647 (US$204.24) per month, ₴52 (US$1.23) per hour, annual wage US$2,450.91	3,802	8,746	40	1.83	4.2	105.8%	1 Jan 2026
United Arab Emirates	No mandated wage.			48 (reduced during Ramadan)				4 April 2025
United Kingdom	The minimum wage in the United Kingdom is: £12.71 stg (US$17.41) per hour for those aged 21+ (also known as the National Living Wage £10.85 (US$14.86) per hour for those aged 18–20 £8 (US$10.96) per hour aged under 18, and those aged 19 or over who are in their first year of apprenticeship. Workers under the school leaving age (usually 16, however varies by region and time of birth in the year, also whether or not they have a National Insurance Number) are not eligible for national minimum wage, as well as certain specialised industries and job roles.	36,215	37,685	40	17.41	18.12	88.3%	1 Apr 2025
United States	The federal nationwide minimum wage in the United States is US$7.25 per hour. States may also set a minimum, in which case the higher of the two is controlling; some territories are exempt and have lower rates. As of January 3, 2022, effective state minimum wage rates range from US$7.25 to US$16.66 per hour, with an average of about $12.00 across all minimum wage workers as of 2019. Local government minimum wages exist as well, the highest of which reach to $17.13 per hour.	15,080	15,080	40	7.25	7.25	26.2%	1 Jan 2025
Uruguay	$U 22,268 (US$507) per month.	6,136	8,950	48	2.46	3.59	41.4%	2024
Uzbekistan	UZS 920,000 (US$71) per month.	1,041	3,090	40	0.5	1.49	47.4%	1 June 2022
Vanuatu	VT 30,000 (US$323) per month, VT 170 per hour.	3,240	2,893	40	1.56	1.39	93.9%	20 Aug 2012
Venezuela	The minimum wage in Venezuela is Bs. 400,000 per month, including a food bond the total raises up to Bs. 800,000, which is equivalent to about US$0.86 as 26 Nov 2020.	10.32						1 May 2020
Vietnam	Varies by region; Region I: ₫5,310,000 per month; Region II: ₫4,730,000 per month; Region III: ₫4,140,000 per month and Region IV: ₫3,700,000 per month.	2,751		40	1.32			1 Jan 2026
Yemen	None; the minimum civil service wage was ﷼21,000 ($100) per month.			48				2013
Zambia	Varies by sector; ZMW 993.6 (US$81) per month for domestic workers. Shop workers' minimum wage is ZMW 1,698.6 with transport, lunch and housing allowances inclusive, and wages increasing according to the grades of employees, with the minimum wage of the highest grade in this category being ZMW 3,558.9. In the general workers' category, which includes receptionists and guards among others, the minimum wage for category one workers is ZMW 1,698.6, while the highest category is at ZMW 3,151.61.	596	1,421	48	0.24	0.57	36.1%	10 Sep 2018
Zimbabwe	None, except for agricultural and domestic workers; government regulations for each of the 22 industrial sectors specify minimum wages. The minimum wage for all mine workers is currently pegged at $227 per month.							2012

== OECD ==
Organisation for Economic Co-operation and Development.

- Note: "Annual working hours" = Annual wages divided by hourly wages.

OECD Real minimum wages (US dollar)
Country	2023					2024				
Country	Nominal		PPP		Annual working hours	Nominal		PPP		Annual working hours
Country	Annual	Hourly	Annual	Hourly	Annual working hours	Annual	Hourly	Annual	Hourly	Annual working hours
Australia	30,008	13.1	31,676	12.4	1,976	30,861	13.4	32,576	12.6	1,976
Belgium	26,234	10.2	31,218	10.9	2,086	26,601	10.3	31,654	11.0	2,086
Brazil	2,984	3.5	6,370	7.0	1,846	3,144	4.0	6,712	7.7	1,937
Bulgaria	5,312	3.5	12,342	7.0	1,846	6,193	4.0	14,390	7.7	1,937
Canada	23,856	9.9	27,282	10.1	2,080	24,455	10.0	27,967	10.2	2,080
Chile	5,438	2.1	10,274	3.0	2,346	5,787	2.2	10,931	3.1	2,346
Colombia	4,249	1.2	10,566	2.6	2,920	4,467	1.2	11,107	2.7	2,920
Costa Rica	8,851	1.2	13,172	2.6	2,920	9,050	1.2	13,469	2.7	2,920
Croatia	9,457	3.5	17,197	7.0	1,846	10,910	4.0	19,839	7.7	1,937
Czech Republic	9,160	3.3	14,370	5.4	2,000	9,769	3.5	15,326	5.8	2,000
Estonia	9,748	3.4	13,519	4.9	2,020	10,651	3.6	14,770	5.2	2,019
France	22,980	13.2	28,653	12.0	2,289	23,025	11.2	28,710	12.1	2,189
Germany	26,523	10.0	33,855	11.5	2,033	26,679	10.3	34,053	11.8	2,033
Greece	11,883	3.7	19,170	5.2	2,507	12,388	4.0	19,984	5.7	2,507
Hungary	7,994	2.8	15,096	5.2	2,112	8,755	2.9	16,534	5.5	2,086
Ireland	25,978	10.8	26,090	9.9	2,080	28,592	11.0	28,716	10.1	2,080
Israel	18,482	8.1	18,406	6.9	2,232	18,821	8.0	18,745	6.9	2,232
Japan	13,712	8.1	20,511	8.0	2,080	-	-	-	-	-
Latvia	8,155	2.8	13,827	4.4	2,086	9,092	2.8	15,415	4.3	2,086
Lithuania	10,988	2.8	18,675	4.9	1,959	12,001	3.8	20,397	6.7	1,965
Luxembourg	32,456	13.3	33,879	12.4	2,077	33,393	13.4	34,857	12.5	2,095
Malta	11,112	3.5	16,822	7.0	1,846	12,019	4.0	18,194	7.7	1,937
Mexico	3,086	0.6	5,141	1.1	2,080	3,536	0.7	5,892	1.2	2,080
Netherlands	28,482	10.5	34,049	11.0	2,253	29,862	10.5	35,699	11.0	2,253
New Zealand	28,925	10.8	32,163	10.4	2,080	29,001	11.5	32,247	11.0	2,035
Peru	3,342	3.5	6,434	7.0	1,846	3,277	4.0	6,308	7.7	1,937
Poland	11,091	3.2	21,303	6.6	2,086	12,426	3.4	24,730	6.9	2,086
Portugal	11,795	4.4	18,808	6.1	2,086	12,875	4.5	19,814	6.3	2,086
Romania	8,286	3.5	18,059	7.0	1,846	9,134	4.0	19,907	7.7	1,937
Slovak Republic	9,343	2.1	15,292	3.2	3,145	9,741	2.1	15,944	3.2	3,319
Slovenia	15,937	5.5	24,501	7.7	2,086	16,286	5.7	25,038	7.9	2,086
South Korea	18,107	6.5	26,467	7.8	2,508	18,138	7.2	26,512	8.6	2,508
Spain	16,820	5.6	25,660	7.1	2,086	17,184	6.8	26,216	8.6	2,086
Turkey	6,790	2.4	17,747	6.2	2,086	7,317	2.6	19,123	6.7	2,086
United Kingdom	27,995	12.23	31,136	10.2	2,079	29,735	10.4	33,071	10.5	2,079
United States	15,525	7.4	15,525	7.4	2,080	15,080	7.3	15,080	7.3	2,080

== See also ==
- Kaitz index
- List of ASEAN countries and subdivisions by minimum wage
- List of countries by average annual labor hours
- List of countries by average wage
- List of countries by median wage
- List of countries by labour productivity
- List of countries by wealth per adult
- List of minimum wage laws
- List of European countries by minimum wage
- List of U.S. states by minimum wage
- List of minimum wages in Canada
- List of minimum wages in China (PRC)
- Minimum Wages Act 1948
