= Smag =

smag or variant, may refer to:

- Soviet Military Administration in Germany (1945-1949), Soviet occupation government in Germany post-WWII
- St. Mary's Academy, Guagua (SMAG), Pampanga, Philippines (est.1908), a co-ed Catholic school
- salaire minimum agricole garanti (French: guaranteed agricultural minimum wage)
- Salzgitter Maschinenbau AG, a German firm in Salzgitter-Bad
- Schiff- und Maschinenbau-Actien-Gesellschaft Germania, former name of German shipbuilder Friedrich Krupp Germaniawerft
- Sefer Mitzvot Gadol (SMaG; English: Large Book of Commandments) by Rabbi Moses ben Jacob of Coucy, enumerating the 613 commandments

== See also ==
- SMAGS (Surface Movement and Guidance System)
