= JJ Bean =

Canadian coffee chain

- Trade name: JJ Bean Coffee Roasters
- Industry: Coffee
- Founded: 1996; 30 years ago in Granville Island, Vancouver, Canada
- Headquarters: Vancouver, Canada, Canada
- Key people: John Neate Jr
- Products: Coffee beverages
- Revenue: CAN$26 million (2019)
- Website: jjbeancoffee.com

JJ Bean is a Canadian coffee chain, coffee retailer, and roaster which operates more than 20 locations in the Greater Vancouver area.

JJ Bean was founded in 1996 by John Neate Jr., opening two locations on Granville Island Market and Vancouver's Port Town with a staff of 12. JJ Bean expanded its operations to Toronto, Ontario, in 2016. The company gave the Ontario minimum wage to Vancouver staff after the province mandated an increased minimum wage in 2018. Further expansion plans in Ontario were suspended during the COVID-19 pandemic, with all five locations in Toronto ceasing operations.

In 2019, JJ Bean reported $26 million in sales with 350 employees. As of 2022, JJ Bean has 23 locations in Vancouver.

== See also ==
- List of coffeehouse chains
