= Minimum wage in Romania =

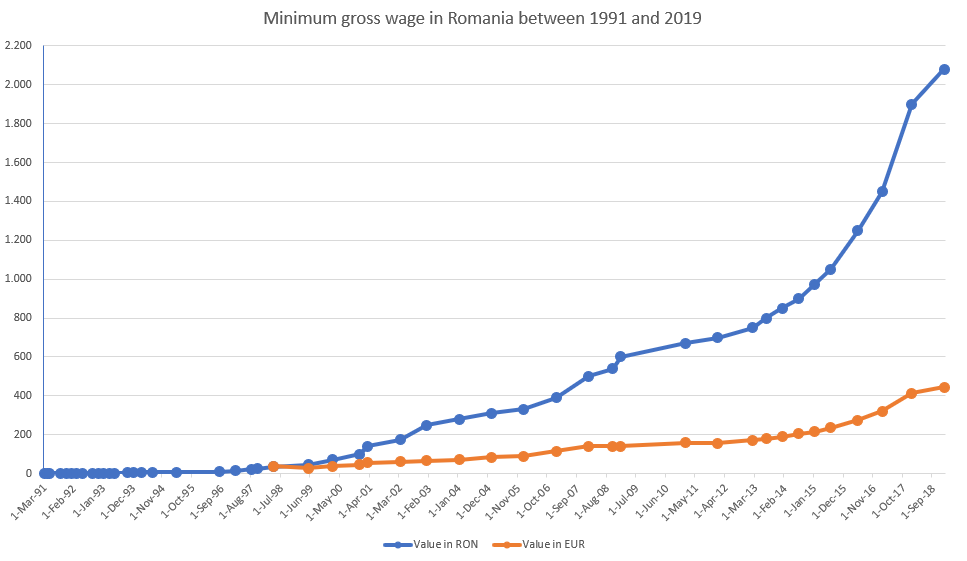
Minimum (Gross) Wage in Romania between 1998 and 2017

The minimum wage in Romania is the lowest monthly or hourly remuneration that employers are legally allowed to pay their workers in Romania. The sum is decided by the Romanian government and is subject to periodic reviews and adjustments based on economic indicators, inflation rates, and other relevant factors.

As of 1 January 2025, the minimum gross monthly wage in Romania is 4.050 RON (BRUT) and 2.574 RON (NET-this is the real salary that they get) in , equivalent to approximately €814 BRUT and €492 NET. This translates to an hourly rate of 15,3 RON, based on a standard work month of 168 hours. This figure doesn't account for any additional benefits, such as meal vouchers or allowances, that employers might provide.

== Chart ==
View source data.
Evolution of the minimum wage in Romania

== History ==
Starting date	Gross Value in RON	Salary Growth	Gross Hourly Pay in RON	NET Value in RON	Gross Value in EUR	NET Value in EUR	Legislation
1 January 2025	4.050 RON	+9.46%	24,5 RON/Hourly	2574 RON	€814	€517	HG 598/2024
1 July 2024	3.700 RON	+12.1%	22,02 RON/Hourly	2363 RON	€743	€474	HG 598/2024
1 October 2023	3.300 RON	+10%	19,96 RON/Hourly	2079 RON	€695	€417	HG 900/2023
1 January 2023	3.000 RON	+17.6%	18,14 RON/Hourly	1898 RON	€645	€383	HG 1447/2022
1 January 2022	2.550 RON	+14.3%	15,23 RON/Hourly	1524 RON	€515	€308	HG 1071/2021
1 January 2020	2230 RON		14,04 RON/Hourly	1346 RON	€466	€281	HG 935/2019
1 January 2019	2080 RON (for people without a University Degree/ 2350 RON for people with a University Degree or minimum 15 working years)				€445/€504		HG 937/2018
1 January 2018	1900 RON	+ 37.9%	11,40 RON/Hourly		€413		HG 846/2017
1 February 2017	1450 RON	+ 16.0%	8,73 RON/Hourly		€320		HG 1/2017
1 May 2016	1250 RON	+ 19.0%	7,38 RON/Hourly		€275		HG 1017/2015
1 July 2015	1050 RON	+ 7.7%			€236		HG 1091/2014
1 January 2015	975 RON	+ 8.3%			€216		HG 1091/2014
1 July 2014	900 RON	+ 5.9%			€205		HG 871/2013
1 January 2014	850 RON	+ 6.3%			€189		HG 871/2013
1 July 2013	800 RON	+ 6.7%			€179		HG 23/2013
1 February 2013	750 RON	+ 7.1%			€171		HG 23/2013
1 January 2012	700 RON	+ 4.5%			€155		HG 1225/2011
1 January 2011	670 RON	+ 11.7%			€159		HG 1193/2010
1 January 2009	600 RON	+ 11.1%			€142		HG 1051/2008
1 October 2008	540 RON	+ 8.0%			€142		HG 1051/2008
1 January 2008	500 RON	+ 28.2%			€140		HG 1507/2007
1 January 2007	390 RON	+ 18.2%			€114		HG 1825/2006
1 January 2006	330 RON	+ 6.5%			€90		HG 1766/2005
1 January 2005	310 RON	+ 10.7%			€85		HG 2346/2004
1 January 2004	2,800,000 ROL	+ 12.0%			€70		HG 1515/2003
1 January 2003	2,500,000 ROL	+ 42.9%			€65		HG 1105/2002
1 March 2002	1,750,000 ROL	+ 25.0%			€62		HG 1037/2001
1 March 2001	1,400,000 ROL	+ 40.0%			€56		HG 231/2001
1 December 2000	1,000,000 ROL	+ 42.9%			€45		HG 1166/2000
1 February 2000	700,000 ROL	+ 55.6%			€39		HG 101/2000
1 May 1999	450,000 ROL	+ 28.6%			€28		HG 296/1999
1 April 1998	350,000 ROL	+ 40.0%			€38		
1 October 1997	250,000 ROL	+ 11.1%					
1 August 1997	225,000 ROL	+ 50.0%					
1 February 1997	150,000 ROL	+ 54.6%					
1 August 1996	97,000 ROL	+ 29.3%					
1 April 1995	75,000 ROL	+ 15.4%					
1 July 1994	65,000 ROL	+ 8.3%					
15 March 1994	60,000 ROL	+ 33.3%					
1 December 1993	45,000 ROL	+ 11.9%					
1 October 1993	40,200 ROL	+ 34.0%					
1 May 1993	30,000 ROL	+ 70.5%					
1 March 1993	17,600 ROL	+ 6.0%					
1 January 1993	16,600 ROL	+ 9.1%					
1 November 1992	15,215 ROL	+ 17.8%					
1 September 1992	12,920 ROL	+ 15.4%					
1 May 1992	11,200 ROL	+ 22.4%					
1 March 1992	9,150 ROL	+ 7.6%					
1 January 1992	8,500 ROL	+ 21.4%					
1 November 1991	7,000 ROL	+ 3.3%					
1 September 1991	6,775 ROL	+ 13.4%					
1 May 1991	5,975 ROL	+ 27.8%					
1 April 1991	4,675 ROL	+ 48.4%					
1 March 1991	3,150 ROL	+ 57.5%					
1 July 1988	2,000 ROL	+ 33.3%					
1 September 1983	1,500 ROL	+ 5.3%					
1 August 1979	1,425 ROL	+ 18.8%					
1 July 1975	1,200 ROL	+ 5.3%					
1 August 1974	1,140 ROL	+ 14.0%					
1 September 1972	1,000 ROL	+ 25.0%					
1 May 1970	800 ROL	+ 6.7%					
1 March 1970	750 ROL	+ 7.1%					
1 August 1967	700 ROL	+ 27.3%					
1 September 1965	550 ROL	+ 15.8%					
1 December 1961	475 ROL	+ 18.8%					
1 August 1959	400 ROL	+ 14.3%					
1 May 1957	350 ROL	+ 59.1%					
1955	220 ROL	+ 32.5%					
1949	166 ROL						

== See also ==
- List of countries by minimum wage
