= Kaitz index =

Economic indicator

The Kaitz index, devised in 1970 and named after Hyman Kaitz, is an economic indicator represented by the ratio of the nominal legal minimum wage to median wage adjusted for the industry-level coverage.

Country	Minimum to median wage ratio in 2025	2025 minimum wages in U.S. dollars purchasing power parity
Colombia	0.91	4
Costa Rica	0.85	6
Chile	..	5
Mexico	0.75	3
New Zealand	0.64	15
France	0.63	16
United Kingdom	0.62	17
Romania	0.61	11
South Korea	0.60	11
Slovenia	0.59	12
Portugal	0.59	10
Poland	0.59	13
Luxembourg	0.56	18
Australia	0.55	17
Spain	0.55	15
Croatia	0.54	10
Bulgaria	0.53	8
Slovak Republic	0.52	8
Israel	0.51	9
Ireland	0.51	15
Germany	0.50	18
Greece	0.50	8
Lithuania	0.50	12
Canada	0.49	13
Belgium	0.48	16
Hungary	0.48	8
Netherlands	0.48	17
Turkey	0.47	8
Czech Republic	0.47	9
Japan	0.46	10
Latvia	0.45	8
Estonia	0.43	8
United States	0.24	7

== See also ==
- Minimum to median wage ratio
- Minimum wage law
