= List of countries by real GDP per capita growth =

Real GDP per capita growth for year 2025 in %: Below -3 -3 to -2 -2 to -1 -1 to 0 0 to 1 / 1 to 2 2 to 3 3 to 4 4 to 5 above 5 No data

This is a list of countries by real GDP per capita growth rate, which is the per capita economic growth of the gross domestic product which takes into account inflation and population growth rate. Real GDP per capita growth is not to be confused with gross national income per capita growth or the real GDP growth.

== List ==
The annual real GDP per capita growth in % according to the World Bank based on constant-dollar accounting is shown for last available year:

Country / territory	GDP per capita annual growth (%)	Year
Afghanistan	-1.0	2024
Albania	5.0	2025
Algeria	2.5	2025
American Samoa	3.6	2022
Andorra	2.7	2025
Angola	0.1	2025
Antigua and Barbuda	4.5	2025
Argentina	4.0	2025
Armenia	5.4	2025
Aruba	6.2	2024
Australia	-0.2	2025
Austria	0.3	2025
Azerbaijan	1.0	2025
Bahamas	2.9	2024
Bahrain	2.7	2025
Bangladesh	2.2	2025
Barbados	2.6	2025
Belarus	1.8	2025
Belgium	0.3	2025
Belize	1.3	2025
Benin	5.5	2025
Bermuda	2.0	2024
Bhutan	7.3	2025
Bolivia	-2.9	2025
Bosnia and Herzegovina	2.9	2025
Botswana	-2.3	2025
Brazil	1.9	2025
Brunei Darussalam	-0.1	2025
Bulgaria	3.2	2025
Burkina Faso	3.0	2025
Burundi	1.8	2025
Cabo Verde	5.8	2025
Cambodia	4.1	2025
Cameroon	0.6	2025
Canada	0.8	2025
Cayman Islands	1.8	2024
Central African Republic	1.0	2025
Chad	2.0	2025
Chile	2.0	2025
China	5.1	2025
Collectivity of Saint Martin	11.3	2021
Colombia	1.6	2025
Comoros	1.8	2025
Costa Rica	4.1	2025
Croatia	3.1	2025
Cuba	-0.7	2024
Curaçao	4.1	2024
Cyprus	2.3	2024
Czech Republic	2.8	2025
DR Congo	2.4	2025
Denmark	2.4	2025
Djibouti	5.1	2025
Dominica	3.6	2025
Dominican Republic	1.3	2025
East Timor	5.6	2025
Ecuador	2.9	2025
Egypt	2.8	2025
El Salvador	3.5	2025
Equatorial Guinea	-8.1	2025
Eritrea	6.7	2011
Estonia	1.0	2025
Eswatini	3.1	2025
Ethiopia	7.0	2025
Faroe Islands	0.4	2024
Fiji	2.7	2025
Finland	-0.3	2025
France	0.6	2025
French Polynesia	0.9	2024
Gabon	0.3	2025
Georgia	4.1	2025
Germany	0.3	2025
Ghana	4.0	2025
Greece	2.0	2025
Greenland	0.5	2023
Grenada	4.3	2025
Guam	4.2	2022
Guatemala	2.7	2025
Guinea	5.0	2025
Guinea-Bissau	3.6	2025
Guyana	18.6	2025
Haiti	-3.8	2025
Honduras	2.1	2025
Hong Kong	3.8	2025
Hungary	1.0	2025
Iceland	-0.2	2025
India	6.6	2025
Indonesia	4.3	2025
Iran	-3.7	2025
Iraq	-4.2	2025
Ireland	10.5	2025
Isle of Man	-2.1	2023
Israel	1.7	2025
Italy	0.6	2025
Ivory Coast	4.0	2025
Jamaica	0.2	2025
Japan	1.7	2025
Jordan	3.1	2025
Kazakhstan	5.2	2025
Kenya	2.6	2025
Kiribati	2.7	2025
Kosovo	4.7	2025
Kuwait	3.4	2025
Kyrgyzstan	9.3	2025
Laos	3.2	2025
Latvia	3.2	2025
Lebanon	-7.6	2024
Lesotho	0.9	2025
Liberia	2.8	2025
Libya	12.2	2025
Liechtenstein	-1.9	2009
Lithuania	2.9	2025
Luxembourg	-0.8	2025
Macau	4.8	2025
Madagascar	0.6	2025
Malawi	-0.7	2025
Malaysia	3.9	2025
Maldives	5.9	2025
Mali	2.6	2025
Malta	2.0	2025
Marshall Islands	5.9	2025
Mauritania	1.2	2025
Mauritius	3.3	2025
Mexico	-0.3	2025
Micronesia	0.6	2025
Moldova	4.2	2025
Monaco	9.4	2024
Mongolia	5.5	2025
Montenegro	2.8	2025
Morocco	2.8	2024
Mozambique	-3.3	2025
Myanmar	-2.6	2025
Namibia	-0.3	2025
Nauru	1.5	2025
Nepal	4.5	2025
Netherlands	1.3	2025
New Caledonia	-14.3	2024
New Zealand	-0.2	2025
Nicaragua	3.6	2025
Niger	3.6	2025
Nigeria	1.9	2025
North Macedonia	3.7	2025
Northern Mariana Islands	18.9	2022
Norway	0.4	2025
Oman	-1.6	2025
Pakistan	2.1	2025
Palau	6.5	2025
Palestine	1.9	2025
Panama	3.1	2025
Papua New Guinea	3.8	2025
Paraguay	5.4	2025
Peru	2.4	2025
Philippines	3.6	2025
Poland	3.9	2025
Portugal	0.8	2025
Puerto Rico	0.9	2025
Qatar	-1.1	2025
Republic of the Congo	0.7	2025
Romania	0.8	2025
Russia	4.6	2024
Rwanda	7.0	2025
Saint Kitts and Nevis	2.5	2025
Saint Lucia	-0.8	2025
Samoa	3.6	2025
San Marino	0.1	2023
Saudi Arabia	-0.2	2025
Senegal	4.3	2025
Serbia	2.6	2025
Seychelles	4.6	2025
Sierra Leone	2.5	2025
Singapore	3.7	2025
Sint Maarten	2.1	2025
Slovakia	1.0	2025
Slovenia	0.9	2025
Solomon Islands	1.2	2025
Somalia	-0.4	2025
South Africa	-0.0	2025
South Korea	1.1	2025
South Sudan	-9.8	2015
Spain	1.8	2025
Sri Lanka	5.7	2025
St. Vincent and Grenadines	4.1	2025
Sudan	-14.7	2024
Suriname	0.9	2025
Sweden	1.3	2025
Switzerland	0.3	2025
Syria	-3.9	2022
São Tomé and Príncipe	-1.0	2025
Tajikistan	6.4	2025
Tanzania	2.6	2024
Thailand	2.5	2025
The Gambia	3.6	2025
Togo	4.0	2025
Tonga	3.2	2025
Trinidad and Tobago	-0.7	2025
Tunisia	1.9	2025
Turkey	3.2	2025
Turkmenistan	4.6	2025
Turks and Caicos Islands	4.9	2024
Tuvalu	5.7	2023
Uganda	3.5	2025
Ukraine	2.5	2024
United Arab Emirates	-0.8	2024
United Kingdom	1.1	2025
United States Virgin Islands	-0.9	2022
United States of America	1.6	2025
Uruguay	1.8	2025
Uzbekistan	5.7	2025
Vanuatu	0.8	2025
Venezuela	1.2	2025
Vietnam	7.4	2025
Yemen	-2.2	2018
Zambia	0.9	2025
Zimbabwe	6.1	2025

== See also ==
- Economic growth
- Democracy and economic growth
- Growth accounting
- List of countries by productivity growth
- Median income
- Per capita income
- Productivity
- Productivity-improving technologies
- Standard of living
