= Minimum wage law =

Legislation to protect workers

Minimum wage law is the body of law which prohibits employers from hiring employees or workers for less than a given hourly, daily or monthly minimum wage. More than 90% of all countries have some kind of minimum wage legislation.

Until recently, minimum wage laws were usually very tightly focused. In the US and Great Britain, for example, they applied only to women and children. Only after the Great Depression did many industrialized economies extend them to the general work force. Even then, the laws were often specific to certain industries. In France, for example, they were extensions of existing trade union legislation. In the US, industry specific wage restrictions were held to be unconstitutional. The country's Fair Labor Standards Act of 1938 established a uniform national minimum wage for nonfarm, nonsupervisory workers. Coverage was later extended to most of the labor force.

- In Mesopotamia during the reign of Hammurabi, minimum wage rates were set by law.
- In 1894, New Zealand established arbitration boards with the Industrial Conciliation and Arbitration Act.
- In 1896, the colony of Victoria, Australia established similar boards.
- In 1907, the Harvester decision was handed down in Australia. It established a 'living wage' for a man, his wife and two children to "live in frugal comfort."
- In 1909, the Trade Boards Act was enacted in the United Kingdom, establishing four such boards.
- In 1912, the state of Massachusetts, United States, set minimum wages for women and children.
- In the United States, statutory minimum wages were first introduced nationally in 1938.
- In the 1960s, minimum wage laws were introduced into Latin America as part of the Alliance for Progress; however these minimum wages were, and are, low.

Several conventions of the International Labour Organization provide for "minimum wage fixing" for rights of labours, for example: Minimum Wage-Fixing Machinery Convention, 1928, Minimum Wage Fixing Machinery (Agriculture) Convention, 1951, and Minimum Wage Fixing Convention, 1970.

== Minimum wage law by jurisdiction ==
=== Australia ===
The Australian National Minimum Wage is the minimum base rate of pay for ordinary hours worked to any employee who is not covered by a Modern Award or an Agreement. In 1896 in Victoria, Australia, an amendment to the Factories Act provided for the creation of a wages board. The wages board did not set a universal minimum wage; rather it set basic wages for 6 industries that were considered to pay low wages. First enacted as a four-year experiment, the wages board was renewed in 1900 and made permanent in 1904; by that time it covered 150 different industries. By 1902, other Australian states, such as New South Wales and Western Australia, had also formed wages boards. The notion of a "basic wage" was established in 1907 with the Harvester Judgment. In Australia, on 14 December 2005, the Australian Fair Pay Commission was established under the Workplace Relations Amendment (WorkChoices) Act 2005 responsible for the adjustment of the standard federal minimum wage, replacing the role of the Australian Industrial Relations Commission that took submissions from a variety of sources to determine appropriate minimum wages. The Australian Fair Pay Commission was replaced by Fair Work Australia in 2010.

==== Australian historical rates ====
Commencement Date	Federal Minimum Wage (AUD)		Notes
Commencement Date	per Hour	per 38 Hour Week	Notes
July 1966		£16/8/-	
14 February 1966	$1.00	$38.00	Currency changed from pounds/shillings/pence (£/s/d) to dollars.cents ($.¢)
1967	$1.00	$38.00	No wage increase
July 1967	Unchanged	Unchanged	No wage increase
October 1968	$1.35	$51.00	Increased to $1.35
December 1969	$1.39	$52.54	3% wage increase
1970	$1.47	$55.90	6% wage increase
January 1971	Unchanged	Unchanged	No wage increase
5 May 1972	$2.00	$76.00	Increased to $2.00
15 December 1972	Unchanged	Unchanged	No wage increase
8 May 1973	$2.04	$77.52	2% wage increase
2 May 1974	$2.08	$81.57	2% + $2.50 wage increase
April 1975	$2.15	$81.88	3.6% wage increase
September 1975	$2.23	$84.75	3.5% wage increase
November 1975	Unchanged	Unchanged	Wage increase refused
February 1976	$2.37	$90.16	6.4% wage increase
May 1976	$2.44	$92.76	3% wage increase
August 1976	$2.50	$95.26	$2.50 wage increase
November 1976	$2.55	$97.09	2.2% wage increase
March 1977	$2.70	$102.79	$5.70 wage increase
May 1977	$2.75	$104.54	1.9% wage increase
August 1977	$2.80	$106.59	2% wage increase
November 1977	$2.84	$107.99	1.5% wage increase
February 1978	$2.88	$109.53	1.5% wage increase
March 1978	$2.91	$110.86	1.3% wage increase
September 1978	$3.02	$115.00	4% wage increase
June 1979	$3.11	$118.43	3.2% wage increase
January 1980	$3.24	$123.49	4.5% wage increase
July 1980	$3.37	$128.29	4.2% wage increase
January 1981	$3.49	$132.79	3.7% wage increase
May 1981	$3.61	$137.39	3.6% wage increase
May 1982	Unchanged	Unchanged	No wage increase
September 1983	$3.76	$142.88	4.3% wage increase
April 1984	$3.91	$148.73	4.1% wage increase
April 1985	$4.01	$152.44	2.6% wage increase
November 1985	$4.16	$158.17	3.8% wage increase
June 1986	$4.25	$161.71	2.3% wage increase
December 1986	Unchanged	Unchanged	Increase refused
March 1987	$4.51	$178.24	$10.00 + 4% wage increase
December 1987	Unchanged	Unchanged	Increase refused
February 1988	$4.84	$184.24	$6.00 wage increase
August 1988	$4.98	$189.43	3% wage increase
February 1989	$5.48	$208.37	10.0% wage increase
August 1989	$5.64	$214.49	3% + 3% wage increase
March–April	$5.64	$214.49	No wage increase
April 1991	$6.59	$250.45	2.5% wage increase
April 1992	$6.59	$250.45	No wage increase
November 1993	$6.80	$258.45	$8.00 wage increase
September 1994	$7.01	$266.45	$8.00 wage increase
March 1995	$7.22	$274.45	No wage increase
October 1995	$7.48	$284.45	$8.00 wage increase
April 1997	$9.45	$359.40	$10.00 wage increase
April 1998	$9.82	$373.40	$14.00 wage increase
April 1999	$10.14	$385.40	$12.00 wage increase
May 2000	$10.53	$400.40	$15.00 wage increase
May 2001	$10.87	$413.40	$13.00 wage increase
May 2002	$11.35	$431.40	$18.00 wage increase
May 2003	$11.80	$448.40	$17.00 wage increase
May 2004	$12.30	$467.40	$19.00 wage increase
May 2005	$12.75	$484.50	$17.00 wage increase
1 July 2006	$13.37	$508.07	$27.36 wage increase
1 December 2006	$13.47	$511.86	$10.26 wage increase
1 October 2007	$13.74	$522.12	
1 October 2008	$14.31	$543.78	
1 July 2009	Unchanged	Unchanged	Fair Work Act 2009 commenced
1 July 2010	$15.00	$569.90	
1 July 2011	$15.51	$589.30	
1 July 2012	$15.96	$606.40	Different rates apply to the young, apprentices/trainees, and people with a disability. Depending on these factors, including geographical cost of living calculations, actual "minimum wage" can be as much as 50% lower than shown.
1 July 2013	$16.37	$622.20	Different rates apply to the young, apprentices/trainees, and people with a disability. Depending on these factors, including geographical cost of living calculations, actual "minimum wage" can be as much as 50% lower than shown.
1 July 2014	$16.87	$640.90	Different rates apply to the young, apprentices/trainees, and people with a disability.
1 July 2015	$17.29	$656.90	
1 July 2016	$17.70	$672.70	
1 July 2017	$18.29	$694.90	
1 July 2018	$18.93	$719.20	Fair work decision (Announced 1 June 2018)
1 July 2019	$19.49	$740.80	
1 July 2020	$19.84	$753.80	Source – www.fairwork.gov.au/minimumwage
1 July 2021	$20.33	$772.60	
1 July 2022	$21.38	$812.60	
1 July 2023	$23.23	$882.80	
1 July 2024	$24.10	$915.80	
1 July 2025	$24.95	$948.10	
1 July 2026	$26.44	$1,004.90	

Australian Fair Work Ombudsman, Minimum Wages Fact Sheet

=== Brazil ===
Since Plano Real, the Brazilian national minimum wage is adjusted annually. Historical data and a rough approximation to US Dollars can be seen in the table below.

Starting date	Value (R$)	Value (US$)
1 July 1994	64,79	70,96
1 September 1994	70,00	81,30
1 May 1995	100,00	104,82
1 May 1996	112,00	109,06
1 May 1997	120,00	108,89
1 May 1998	130,00	95,45
1 May 1999	136,00	74,52
3 April 2000	151,00	79,85
1 April 2001	180,00	73,71
1 April 2002	200,00	63,88
1 April 2003	240,00	82,08
1 May 2004	260,00	91,48
1 May 2005	300,00	130,82
1 April 2006	350,00	162,52
1 April 2007	380,00	201,60
1 March 2008	415,00	218,67
1 February 2009	465,00	236,27
1 January 2010	510,00	293,77
1 January 2011	540,00	332,92
1 March 2011	545,00	336,00
1 January 2012	622,00	348,08
1 January 2013	678,00	331,38
1 January 2014	724,00	302,80
1 January 2015	788,00	280,33
1 January 2016	880,00	225,41
1 January 2017	937,00	283,94
1 January 2018	954,00	
1 January 2019	998,00	
1 January 2020	1.039,00	
1 February 2020	1.045,00	
1 January 2021	1.100,00	
1 January 2022	1.212,00	
1 January 2023	1.302,00	
1 May 2023	1.320,00	
1 January 2024	1.412,00	
1 January 2025	1.518,00	

In Brazil each increase the minimum wage results in a significant burden on the federal budget, because the minimum wage is tied to social security benefits and other government programs and salaries.

=== Canada ===
Under the Canadian Constitution's federal-provincial division of powers, the responsibility for enacting and enforcing labour laws rests with the ten provinces; the three territories also were granted this power by virtue of federal legislation. This means that each province and territory has its own minimum wage. Some provinces allow lower wages to be paid to liquor servers and other tip earners, and/or to inexperienced employees.

The federal government could theoretically set its own minimum wage rates for workers in federal jurisdiction industries (interprovincial railways, for example). As of 2006 however, the federal minimum wage is defined to be the general adult minimum wage rate of the province or territory where the work is performed. This means, for example, that an interprovincial railway company could not legally pay a worker in British Columbia less than $10.45 an hour regardless of the worker's experience.

=== People's Republic of China ===
The Ministry of Human Resources and Social Security set the People's Republic of China's first minimum wage law on 1 March 2004. The Regulations on Enterprises Minimum Wage was made to "ensure the basic needs of the worker and his family, to help improve workers' performance and to promote fair competition between enterprises." One monthly minimum wage was set for full-time workers, and one hourly minimum wage for part-time workers. Provinces, municipalities, and autonomous regions are allowed to legislate for their own minimum wage separate from the national one.

Alongside local discretion in minimum wage standards, national rules also provide for how those standards are defined and enforced. China’s Minimum Wage Rules (2004) set minimum wage standards that cover employers and workers nationwide, with rules on how these standards are structured and updated locally. The Rules distinguish between monthly minimum wages for full-time workers and hourly minimum wages for part-time workers, direct provincial labor regulators to develop local minimum wage plans through an approval process, and require that standards be adjusted as necessary and revised at least once every two years. Under the Rules, county labor regulators and local labor unions are tasked with overseeing employer compliance with local standards and are empowered to request enforcement against and order noncompliant employers to correct violations, pay any owed wages, and, in some cases, pay compensatory damages of one to five times owed wages.

A law approved February 2013 mandates a nationwide minimum wage at 40% average urban salaries to be phased in fully by 2015. See List of minimum wages in China (PRC) for a list of the latest minimum monthly wages for various provinces or municipalities in China.

==== Hong Kong ====
The Legislative Council of Hong Kong (LegCo) passed the Minimum Wage Bill in 2010, requiring the Chief Executive to propose a minimum wage. Through a Provisional Minimum Wage Commission appointed by the government, a HK$28 hourly wage floor was introduced and eventually accepted by the LegCo after much debate. Prior to this, a monthly minimum wage of HK$3,580 for foreign domestic helpers had already been set. In some trades, such as bar-bending and bamboo scaffolding workers in the construction industry, have daily minimum wage negotiated between the trade unions and employers' organisations. As of September 2018, the statutory minimum wage is HK$37.50 per hour.

=== European Union ===
In the European Union 18 out of 27 member states currently have national minimum wages. Many countries, such as Sweden, Finland, Denmark, Austria, Italy, and Cyprus have no minimum wage laws but rely on employer groups and trade unions to set minimum earnings through collective bargaining.

==== France ====
The first nationwide minimum wage in France was introduced via the Interprofessional Guaranteed Minimum Wage (SMIG – Salaire minimum interprofessionnel garanti) law, passed in 1950 and accompanied by a High Commission for Collective Agreements (to set the wages based on average cost of living) and a companion law known as "SMAG" for rural/agricultural occupations. The SMIG, which established one baseline hourly wage rate for the Paris region and one for the rest of the country, was indexed to price inflation but rose more slowly than average wages. It was replaced by (SMIC – Salaire minimum interprofessionnel de croissance) in 1970, which remains the basis of the modern minimum wage law in France.

The national minimum wage (SMIC) in France is updated by the government every year in January. By law, the increase cannot be lower than the inflation rate for the previous year. In recent years, the increase was up to two times higher than inflation (around 5%, with inflation around 2%).

In 2004, 15% of the working population received the minimum wage. In July 2006, the minimum wage in France was set at €8.27 per hour. In July 2008 it was set at €8.71 per hour. An increase of 1.3% on 1 July 2009 brought the hourly rate to €8.82. In 2010, the minimum wage was increased by 0.5% to €8.86 per hour.

==== Germany ====
Germany's national minimum wage law (MiLoG – Mindestlohngesetz) came into force on 1 January 2015, introducing Germany's first nationwide legal minimum wage to the amount of €8.50 per hour. The German minimum wage level will be updated every other year by a minimum wage commission and acceptance by the government. Since a legal minimum wage law is a derogation of the constitutional right of a collective tariff autonomy, it is discussed whether and to what extent the minimum wage is consistent with the constitution.

==== Ireland ====
The minimum wage was introduced in Ireland in 2000 at IR£4.40 (€5.59) per hour, and as of 1 January 2025, it is €13.50 per hour. This is subject to reduction as follows:

- 30% reduction for all employees under 18.
- 20% reduction for employees aged 18
- 10% reduction for employees aged 19

It may further be reduced by up to €4.55 a day if lodgings and/or food are provided as part of a job.

Ireland's minimum wage prior to the €1 cut in the 2011 budget, was only fifth highest of eight EU countries surveyed for the British Low-Pay Commission Report in 2010, with the UK, Netherlands, France and Belgium all listed as having higher minimum wage rates when OECD Comparative Price Levels are taken into account.

=== India ===
India has among the most complicated minimum wage laws, with over 1200 minimum wages across the country, depending on the regional level of villages, tehsils, towns and cities and their individual expenses. For example, Mumbai has a minimum wage of Rs. 348/month (as of 2017) while the minimum wages in Nashik and villages in Bihar are far lesser. However, the law is rarely implemented at the ground level, even for contract labourers for government projects and works.In Mumbai, as of 2017, the minimum wage was Rs. 348/day.

=== Japan ===
View chart definition.
Japan's minimum wage rate over time, Weighted national average

=== New Zealand ===
- New Zealand was the first country to implement a national minimum wage, enacted by its government through the Industrial Conciliation and Arbitration Act 1894.
- Current minimum wage law is described in the Minimum Wage Act 1983. The Minimum Wage (New Entrants) Amendment Act 2007 provided that the rates for 16- to 17-year-olds and those in training cannot be lower than 80% of the adult rate.

==== Application of gendered wage rates ====
From 1 April 1946 to 31 March 1977, there were separate minimum wage rates for men and women in New Zealand. From 1 April 1977, New Zealand abolished these gendered minimum wages, instead having one minimum wage for all adults.

==== Application of youth and adult rates ====
From 5 March 2001, the minimum youth rate (now known as the Starting Out rate) applied only to workers aged 16 or 17-years-old. From 31 March 1994 to 4 March 2001, the minimum youth rate applied to workers aged 16, 17, 18 or 19-years-old. Before 31 March 1994, there was no minimum wage for workers under the age of 20. As such, the adult minimum wage has applied to workers aged 18 and older since 5 March 2001. Before that, it applied to workers aged 20 and older.

==== Current rates ====
As at 1 April 2023, the current minimum wage rates in New Zealand are:

Wage group	Rate (NZD per hour).
Adult rate^{[A]}	$22.70
Training rate ^{[B]}	$18.16
Starting Out rate^{[C]}	$18.16
Aged 15 years or under	No minimum applies

^{A} The adult minimum wage is available to those persons aged 18 or older.
^{B} The training rate can be applied to those completing recognised industry training involving at least 60 credits per year.
^{C} Workers aged 16 or 17-years-old may be on the Starting Out rate.

==== Historical rates ====
===== 1946 to 1967 =====
Note: Until 10 July 1967, New Zealand's currency was the New Zealand pound, a non decimal currency denoted in pounds (£), shillings (s.) and pence (d.)

Commencement Date	Male rate (NZ£ per hour)	Female rate (NZ£ per hour)
1 April 1946	2s. 9d.	1s. 8d.
3 October 1952	4s. 1d.	2s. 9d.
18 December 1953	4s. 6d.	3s.
16 December 1954	4s. 7.5d.	3s. 1d.
7 December 1956	4s. 10d.	3s. 3d.
23 October 1959	5s. 1d.	3s. 5d.
10 August 1962	5s. 2.5d.	3s. 6d.
30 October 1964	5s. 6.5d.	3s. 8.5d.
17 February 1967	5s. 8.25d.	3s. 9.75d.

===== 1967 to 1977 =====
Commencement Date	Male rate (NZD per hour)	Female rate (NZD per hour)
10 July 1967	$0.57	$0.39
11 October 1968	$0.60	$0.41
10 October 1969	$0.65	$0.47
23 April 1971	$0.68	$0.49
28 April 1973	$1.125	$0.85
26 October 1973	$1.175	$0.94
22 February 1974	$1.21	$0.97
12 July 1974	$1.32	$1.06
1 October 1974	$1.32	$1.125
24 January 1975	$1.375	$1.17
11 July 1975	$1.43	$1.235
1 October 1975	$1.43	$1.29
10 February 1976	$1.52	$1.38
1 October 1976	$1.52	$1.45
15 March 1977	$1.62	$1.54

===== 1977 to present =====
Commencement Date	Adult rate (NZD per hour)^{[A]}	Youth rate (NZD per hour)^{[B]}	Training Rate (NZD per hour)^{[C]}
1 April 1977	$1.62	N/A	N/A
17 July 1978	$1.86	N/A	N/A
3 September 1979	$1.95	N/A	N/A
1 August 1980	$2.03	N/A	N/A
11 June 1981	$2.14	N/A	N/A
5 February 1985	$2.50	N/A	N/A
2 September 1985	$4.25	N/A	N/A
9 February 1987	$5.25	N/A	N/A
8 February 1988	$5.625	N/A	N/A
15 May 1989	$5.875	N/A	N/A
17 September 1990	$6.125	N/A	N/A
31 March 1994	$6.125	$3.68	N/A
22 March 1995	$6.25	$3.75	N/A
18 March 1996	$6.375	$3.825	N/A
1 March 1997	$7.00	$4.20	N/A
6 March 2000	$7.55	$4.55	N/A
5 March 2001	$7.70	$5.40	N/A
18 March 2002	$8.00	$6.40	N/A
24 March 2003	$8.50	$6.80	N/A
1 April 2004	$9.00	$7.20	$7.20
21 March 2005	$9.50	$7.60	$7.60
27 March 2006	$10.25	$8.20	$8.20
1 April 2007	$11.25	$9.00	$9.00
1 April 2008	$12.00	$9.60	$9.60
1 April 2009	$12.50	$10.00	$10.00
1 April 2010	$12.75	$10.20	$10.20
1 April 2011	$13.00	$10.40	$10.40
1 April 2012	$13.50	$10.80	$10.80
1 April 2013	$13.75	$11.00	$11.00
1 April 2014	$14.25	$11.40	$11.40
1 April 2015	$14.75	$11.80	$11.80
1 April 2016	$15.25	$12.20	$12.20
1 April 2017	$15.75	$12.60	$12.60
1 April 2018	$16.50	$13.20	$13.20
1 April 2019	$17.70	$14.16	$14.16
1 April 2020	$18.90	$15.12	$15.12
1 April 2021	$20.00	$16.00	$16.00
1 April 2022	$21.20	$16.96	$16.96
1 April 2023	$22.70	$18.16	$18.16

^{A} The adult minimum wage applied to persons aged 20 and over until 5 March 2001. Since then, the adult minimum wage has applied to persons aged 18 and over.
^{B} From 5 March 2001, the minimum youth rate applied only to workers aged 16 or 17-years-old. On 1 May 2013, this rate became known as the Starting Out rate, and would apply to those aged 16 or 17-years-old, who have not worked for six continuous months for that employer. From 31 March 1994 to 4 March 2001, the minimum youth rate applied to workers aged 16, 17, 18 or 19-years-old. Before 31 March 1994, there was no minimum wage for workers under the age of 20.
^{C} While the training rate and youth rate have been the same, they are listed separately in Orders in Council that give effect to the minimum wage. Currently, this rate is applied to those who are completing recognised industry training involving at least 60 credits per year.

=== Pakistan ===
Monthly minimum wages in Pakistan are recommended by the Federal Government under nationally applicable Labour Policies and set by Provincial Minimum Wages Boards under the Minimum Wages Ordinance, 1961.

Pakistan's first minimum wage was introduced in 1992 when it was set at PKR 1,500 (~US$45) per month.

It was, subsequently, raised:

in 1996 to PKR 1,650 (~US$45.83) per month
in 1998 to PKR 1,950 (~US$40.12) per month
in 2001 to PKR 2,500 (~US$ $40.90) per month
in 2003 to PKR 3,000 (~US$ $54.15) per month
in 2004 to PKR 4,000 (~US$ $69.32) per month
in 2007 to PKR 4,600 (~US$ $75.78) per month
in 2008 to PKR 6,000 (~US$ $85.42) per month
in 2010 to PKR 7,000 (~US$ $83.83) per month
in 2012 to PKR 8,000 (~US$ $86.39) per month
in 2013 to PKR 10,000 (~US$ $102.56) per month
in 2014 to PKR 12,000 (~US$ $124.10) per month

(USD equivalents are calculated using the average annual exchange rate in the respective year)

=== Romania ===
Two minimum wage levels are enforced in Romania. For state employees, the level is set by law at 600 RON (~US$200). For all other employees, the wage is set at 440RON (~US$145) by collective bargaining, which also stipulates multiplication indices for various levels of education. Jobs that require high-school and college qualifications are paid at least 1.5 and 2 times the minimum wage, respectively. Teachers' unions resorted to justice to claim same treatment and be paid according to collective bargaining. As of November 2007, they won three landmark cases and expect similar decisions in several dozens other courts. A single, unified level was proposed starting 1 January 2008 but it failed.

=== Taiwan ===
The Taiwanese government does not have a set minimum wage, but a basic wage in its Labor Standards Law serves the minimum wage function. The basic wage set per month is NT$25,250, NT$168 per hour, effective 1 July 2022.

=== United Kingdom ===
Municipal regulation of wage levels began in some towns in 1524.

==== Wages councils ====
The Trade Boards Act 1909 created four Trades Boards that set minimum wages which varied between industries for a number of sectors where "sweating" was generally regarded as a problem and where collective bargaining was not well established. This system was extended considerably after the Second World War; in 1945 Trades Boards became Wages Councils, which set minimum wage standards in many sectors of the economy, including the service sector as well as manufacturing.

Wages councils fell into decline due, in large part, to Trades Union opposition. A lower limit of pay, or "pay floor" was regarded as threatening the voluntary system of collective bargaining favoured in the UK. The government attempted to abolish Wages Councils in 1986, having abandoned existing legislation that tried to widen the scope of voluntary agreements to include those firms that had not taken part in negotiations, such as the Fair Wages Resolutions. These required that government contractors pay fair wages and respect the rights of their employees to be members of trades unions. The Wages Act 1986 reformed the wages councils and abolished the power to create new ones.

Wages councils were finally abolished in 1993,

==== National Minimum Wage ====
A National Minimum Wage (NMW) was introduced for the first time by the Labour government on 1 April 1999 at the rate of £3.60 per hour for those workers aged 22 and over, Labour having promised to set a minimum wage in their 1997 general election campaign. In its election manifesto, it had said that every other modern industrial country had already adopted a minimum wage.

This rate was set after the Low Pay Commission (LPC), an independent body the government appointed in July 1997 to advise it on low pay, recommended the rate. The LPC's permanent status was later confirmed and it continues to make recommendations to government on the NMW, which has been uprated in October every year since 2000. The LPC board consists of nine members—three trade unionists, three employers, and three labour market relations experts. The Commission undertakes consultations each year to gather available evidence before making recommendations in its biennial review.

The current minimum wage in the UK, as of April 2021 is £8.91 per hour for workers aged 23 and above, £8.36 for workers aged 21–22, £6.56 for workers aged 18–20, £4.62 for workers under 18, and £4.30 for apprentices aged 16–18 and those aged 19 or over who are in their first year.

Some workers undertaking apprenticeships or accredited training may be exempted (that is, not considered eligible to receive the NMW) for a certain period of time, which varies according to their age and the length of time in employment. Other categories of worker who are exempt include au pairs, share fishermen, clergy, those in the Armed Forces, prisoners and some people working in family businesses. The rate payable under the NMW can, in all cases, also be reduced where accommodation is provided to the worker.

Unlike most other employment rights legislation in the UK, which generally rely on affected individuals raising grievances and making claims, if necessary, before tribunals to enforce these rights, the NMW has compliance teams, attached to His Majesty's Revenue and Customs (HMRC) offices who will act on approaches from workers who think they are being paid less than the minimum wage by contacting and visiting their employers. Affected workers can either make a complaint directly to a national helpline or seek advice from another agencies such as their local Citizens Advice Bureau or the Scottish Low Pay Unit—this is particularly recommended if other employment rights issues are involved, as the HMRC can only deal with minimum wage enquiries.

==== National Living Wage ====
From 1 April 2016 a National Living Wage was introduced for workers over 25, implemented at a significantly higher minimum wage rate. It was expected to rise to at least £9 per hour by 2020, although the actual figure set for April 2020 was £8.72.

=== United States ===
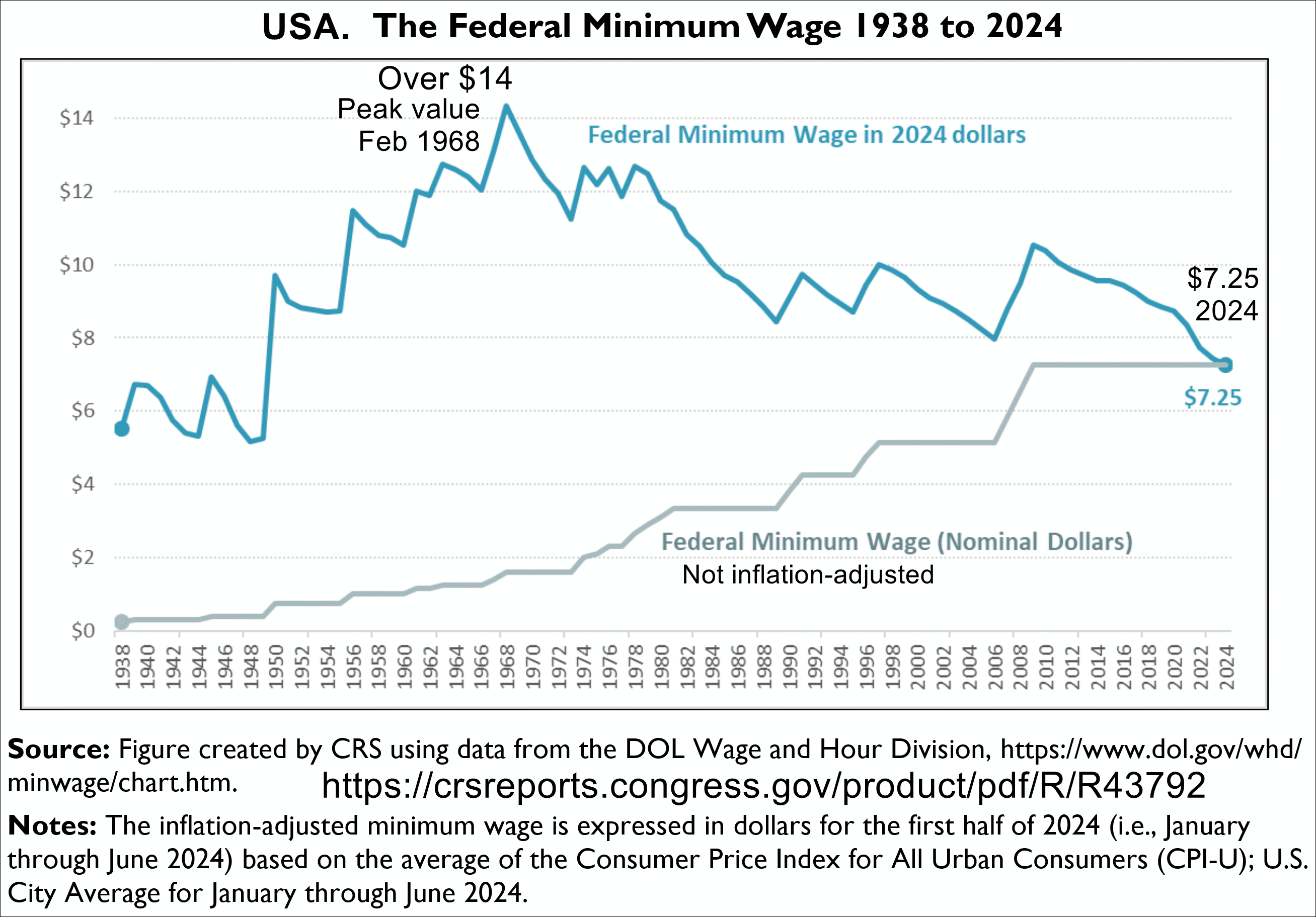
History of the US federal minimum wage. Lower line is nominal dollars. Top line is inflation-adjusted.

No business which depends for existence on paying less than living wages to its workers has any right to continue in this country.

— President Franklin Delano Roosevelt, 1933, Statement on National Industrial Recovery Act.

US state minimum wages

In the United States, statutory minimum wages were first introduced nationally in 1938.

The Fair Minimum Wage Act of 2007 is the current federal minimum wage law of the United States. It was signed into law on 25 May 2007 as a rider to the U.S. Troop Readiness, Veterans' Care, Katrina Recovery, and Iraq Accountability Appropriations Act, 2007. The act implemented three increases to the federal minimum wage—from $5.15 an hour to $5.85 per hour on 24 July 2007, to $6.55 per hour on 24 July 2008, and to $7.25 an hour on 24 July 2009.

Nearly all states within the United States have minimum wage laws; Alabama, Louisiana, Mississippi, South Carolina, and Tennessee are the only states yet to set a minimum wage law.

As of 24 July 2009, U.S. federal law requires a minimum wage of at least $7.25 per hour. In 2011 5.2% of all hourly-paid workers age 16 or over earned an hourly wage at or below the federal minimum wage.

According to the Economic Policy Institute, the minimum wage in the United States would have been $18.28 in 2013 if the minimum wage kept pace with labor productivity. To adjust for increased rates of worker productivity in the United States, raising the minimum wage to $22 (or more) an hour has been presented.

== See also ==
- Average worker's wage
- Economic inequality
- Fair Labor Standards Act
- List of minimum wages by country
- List of U.S. minimum wages
- Living wage
- Maximum wage
- Minimum wage
- Minimum Wage Fixing Convention, 1970
- Minimum wage in the United States
- United States labor law
- Wage slavery
- Working poor
