= Minimum wage in Taiwan =

The minimum wage in Taiwan is the lowest hourly or monthly remuneration that employers may legally pay to workers in Taiwan. It is also known as the basic wage. Taiwan's basic wage system is discussed in the third quarter of every year by the Basic Wage Committees and announced and implemented by the Executive Yuan after its approval. The current net minimum wage in Taiwan is NT$29,500 per month (c. US$912) and NT$196 (US$6.06) per hour, as of 1 January 2026.

== Applicability ==
According to the Labor Standards Law, workers who are applicable may be applicable to the basic wage as well, and wages that employers give to them may not be less than the basic wage.

Minimum monthly wage (1979–2023)	Minimum hourly wage (1992–2023)

== History ==
=== 20th century ===
Taiwan first established a minimum wage in 1956, with the Minimum Wage Act.

In 1968, the ROC Executive Yuan issued Temporary Measures for the Basic Wage, which regulated NT$600 as the monthly basic wage. Meanwhile, it was the first official basic wage rule regulated by law.

In 1984, Article 21 of the Labor Standards Law provided, "A worker shall be paid such wages as determined through negotiations with the employer, provided, however, that such wages shall not fall below the basic wage."

In 1986, Article 23 of the Minimum Wage Law, set up on the continent 11 December 1936 and published on 23 December 1936, was abolished by legislature on November 21, as announced by the president on 3 December 1986.

In 1988, after the adoption of the Regulations of Basic Wage, the Council of Labor Affairs formulated basic wage related policy and began to have adjustments every year. Because of the Asian financial crisis, a large number of industrial relocation, and other factors, it did not adjust it for nearly a decade from 1997 to 2007. The monthly wage was NT$15,840 then.

=== 21st century ===
In 2007, the basic wage included holiday working hours. The hourly wage had a substantial portion of adjusted, but the monthly wage had about 9% of the adjustments.

Since 2010, Basic Wage Committees, which consist of workers, employers, and government representatives, administer the basic wage. The Executive Yuan announces and implements the related policy of the basic wage.

In 2012, the Executive Yuan of Taiwan intended to attract investments made by Taiwanese in China back to Taiwan. It wanted to increase the proportions of foreign workers hired in manufacturers to above 40% and to decouple the basic wages of its citizens and foreign workers.

However, some organizations firmly opposed the policy. They thought it violated international conventions and value of the International Labour Organization. Once the basic wages of foreign workers were decoupled, Taiwan would be contrary to its own commitments in the international arena.

Furthermore, some groups believe that the basic wages between citizens and foreign workers should be decoupled to avoid high domestic wages of foreign workers. This would trigger domestic enterprises to flee abroad, causing the domestic employment market to shrink, and making local workers suffer.

In 28 August 2013, the CLA held the 26th the basic wage review committee. The hourly basic wage went from NT$109 to NT$115, from 1 January 2014. The basic wage per month changed from NT$19,047 to NT$19,273, from 1 July 2014.

The government wants to avoid labor disputes caused by the annual committee and set a threshold of the basic wage to reconvene the council. (The price index must have risen over 3%.)

On 16 August 2018, the Ministry of Labor announced the increase of monthly minimum wage from NT$22,000 to NT$23,100, and hourly minimum wage from NT$140 to NT$150, effective 1 January 2019.
