= Interprofessional Guaranteed Minimum Wage =

French minimum wage (1950–70)

The Interprofessional guaranteed minimum wage or salaire minimum interprofessionnel garanti ('SMIG') was the first statutory minimum wage in France, adopted in 1950. A number of former French colonies also have or have previously had a law with that name or a similar name. This article concerns the SMIG laws of France and Morocco.

== In France (1950-1970) ==
French sovereignty after the occupations of World War II was restored in 1945 and the French Fourth Republic began on 13 October 1946. The years leading to 1950 were politically contentious but focused on economic reconstruction from the devastation of the war. The centrist coalition governments of the Third Force, positioned between the Communist left and the Gaullist right, adopted the country's first minimum wage law in 1950. However, the groundwork had actually been laid during the wartime Vichy government.

According to the Paris-based Higher Institute of Labour (Institut supérieur du travail), in its history of minimum wage laws in France:

It was the Charter of Work issued on October 4, 1941 that paved the way. It referred to a 'living minimum wage' and this notion necessarily had a universal character: a subsistence minimum is the same for everyone, whatever the profession. Still, the cost of life is not the same everywhere which was then much more sensitive than today. Therefore, they had divided the country into twenty "pay zones", each with a different minimum wage, but all minimum wages proceeded downward from that of Zone 0 (Paris) by a fixed percentage: -2.5% zone, -4% zone, etc., which allowed them to maintain unity while respecting [economic] diversity. This system of zones would not disappear until May 1968: By then there were only two zones.

Paul Bacon (of the Christian Democratic MRP), who was the Minister of Labor from 1950 to 1956 and again in 1957–1959, is considered to be the father of the postwar Interprofessional Guaranteed Minimum Wage (SMIG) law passed in February 1950 under the second government of Georges Bidault, a Third Force Coalition government.

The value of the minimum wage was set by the High Commission for Collective Agreements, established by a decree on 3 March 1950. They were in charge of assessing the composition of the average household budget, which served to determine the value of the SMIG (i.e. minimum rate).

In August 1950, the first report of the commission was presented to the Council of Ministers (the cabinet), which issued a decree that established the first SMIG rate at 64 francs (or 78 in Île-de-France, the Paris region). The decree did not apply at the time to certain parts of France: those overseas departments in French Algeria, Guadeloupe, Martinique, and Réunion. They would have their SMIG rate set later, depending on local conditions. The minimum rate in France also did not apply to agricultural occupations, which received a separate minimum wage law, called the SMAG, later in 1950 (see below).

Defending the minimum wage as it was implemented under his first government, Prime Minister René Pleven (who also led a Third Force coalition) presented it as a means of fighting the expansion of Communism. This was one of the unifying concerns of the Third Force governments of the period. (The French minimum wage law was introduced the year after the Berlin Blockade by the Soviet Union and at the midpoint of the First Indochina War, which France's military was waging against the communist Viet Minh independence movement.)

The SMIG law was replaced in 1970 by the Salaire minimum interprofessionnel de croissance (SMIC) and by the "minimum guarantee." The latter is the basis for calculating the allocation of certain social benefits beyond wages. The reason for this change was that the SMIG minimum wage, which was only indexed to prices, increased less rapidly than average wages due to the increase in productivity (which means fewer working hours are needed to produce the same quantity of goods), which President Georges Pompidou considered abnormal. The current minimum wage of France, SMIC, (as of June 1, 2026) is €1,867.02 gross monthly.

Today, the French acronym "SMIC" is synonymous with the concept of "minimum wage," and it is dated (as well as incorrect) to use the term SMIG interchangeably with SMIC to mean minimum wage. The similarity between the two acronyms has sometimes been a source of confusion (and is sometimes not distinguished clearly in computerized translations). Even Socialist Party leader François Mitterrand, who would become President of France in a later election, mistakenly used the term SMIG in a 1974 presidential debate with Giscard d'Estaing, who quipped in response that this error proved his opponent was a "man of the past." At the time, the SMIC had only been the law for a few years. Mitterrand had actually been a Cabinet Minister in the Pleven government in 1950, the year of SMIG's introduction.

=== SMAG (agricultural minimum wage) ===
Later in 1950, in October, a guaranteed minimum agricultural wage (SMAG or salaire minimum agricole garanti) was adopted under the first government of René Pleven, a Third Force Coalition government like the Bidault government, which had passed the SMIG law for other professions earlier in the year.

At introduction, SMAG was less than the minimum wage, in consideration of factors specific to the existence of rural life of the time (lower housing costs, direct access to food, etc.). However, it was aligned with the regular minimum wage in June 1968, the rural living conditions having been reconciled with urban living conditions.

=== Legislators behind the SMIG law of 1950 ===
- Mme Marcelle Devaud, draftsman of the Committee on Justice.
- Mr. Abel Burand, Rapporteur of the Committee on Marine and Fisheries.
- Mr. Pierre de Villoutreys, draftsman of the industrial production commission.
- Mr. Pierre de Felice, draftsman of the Committee on Agriculture.
- Mr. Georges Laffargue, President and Rapporteur of the Committee on Economic Affairs.
- Mr. Marc Bardon-Damarzid, draftsman of the Committee on Justice.

== In Morocco ==
Morocco was a protectorate of France from 1912 until 1956, just a few years after the French government had introduced the SMIG minimum wage in France. French remains a recognized national language of Morocco and French legal influences like the SMIG continue up to the present.

=== Official definition ===
The "interprofessional guaranteed minimum wage" (SMIG) currently refers in Morocco to the country's hourly minimum wage in force now. As its name suggests, the minimum wage applies to all professional bodies with the notable exception of agricultural occupations. As France had done in 1950, Morocco made these jobs subject to a separate wage system, also called the SMAG (for guaranteed minimum agricultural wage).

The minimum wage is fixed by decree by the government. This is usually done as a result of intense tripartite negotiations between the state, the unions and employers.

=== History of increases ===
The kingdom's SMIG minimum wage fixed in 2008 at 9.66 Moroccan dirham (DH) per hour, or about 1,800 DH / month (gross). In 2009 after many negotiations between the Moroccan government and the various unions minimum wage stood at 10.64 DH / h or 2,110 DH / month.

On May 26, 2011, the coalition Moroccan government under conservative Prime Minister Abbas El Fassi decided to increase the SMIG minimum wage by 15% in two tranches for the sectors of industry, of commerce, and services (and SMAG for agriculture). It was to come into effect from 1 July 2011 at the rate of 10% and from 1 July 2012 (5%), according to the Moroccan Minister of Communication and Moroccan government spokesman, Mr. Khalid Naciri, a socialist, after a meeting of the Moroccan Government Council.

Thus, the minimum wage in the sectors of industry, trade and services will amount to 11.70 dirhams per hour from 1 July 2011 and then to 12.24 DH / hour from 1 July 2012 . Regarding the agricultural and forestry sector, the minimum daily wage will be at 60.63 DH as of 1 July 2011 and will be of 63.39 DH from 1 July 2012.

So between 2008 and 2012 the minimum wage increased from 9.66 DH / h to 12.24 DH / h an increase of 26.7%.

In 2014, the Moroccan government announced the increase of the minimum wage by 5% in July 2014 and 5% in July 2015 to move from 12,85DH / h 13,46DH / h in summer 2015.

The legal workweek in Morocco is 44 hours per week, which means by the summer of 2015 the Moroccan minimum wage for full-time employment will equal 30,796.48 DH / year on average 2566.37 DH / month (€228.51 / month according to the exchange rate on 29.04.2014).
