= List of countries by labour productivity =

The following list of countries by labour productivity ranks countries by their workforce productivity. Labour productivity can be measured as gross domestic product (GDP) or gross national income (GNI) generated per hour of work.

== OECD ==
Different countries by labour productivity measured as GDP per hour worked in 2023 (US$ PPP), GNI per hour worked in 2022 (US$ PPP), and productivity growth in 2024 (%):

Country	GDP per hour worked (2023)	GNI per hour worked (2022)	Productivity growth (%)
Ireland	149.31	116.7	0.51
Norway	132.28	119.3	2.09
Luxembourg	126.45	88.1	−0.37
Switzerland	100.63	98.5	1.24
Belgium	100.33	101.5	0.71
Denmark	99.23	107.6	3.34
United States	97.05	92.3	2.49
Austria	94.96	95.1	−0.21
Netherlands	94.38	91.5	−0.23
Germany	93.81	94.4	−0.13
Sweden	89.22	99.2	1.37
France	88.15	88.3	0.37
Australia	83.66	75.6	−10.90
Finland	82.96	85.5	0.63
United Kingdom	78.05	77.1	−0.72
Italy	77.09	74.7	−1.53
Canada	73.44	70.9	−0.35
Spain	73.42	69.1	1.58
Slovenia	65.50	60.9	0.59
Israel	60.51	58.0	0.41
Czech Republic	60.48	54.5	−1.26
Lithuania	60.37	59.0	−0.15
Slovakia	60.13	55.7	1.26
Portugal	59.25	55.5	1.23
Japan	56.26	57.0	−2.90
Latvia	55.88	57.1	−0.34
New Zealand	55.42	50.6	0.06
Hungary	54.74	50.2	0.12
South Korea	54.64	50.8	−3.12
Poland	54.28	53.8	4.20
Estonia	53.38	53.3	−1.65
Greece	44.78	44.3	0.30
Chile	36.51	33.6	–
Costa Rica	31.84	27.5	0.03
Mexico	24.97	23.4	−19.75
Colombia	21.35	20.0	–
Turkey	–	44.4	–
Bulgaria	–	–	3.55
Croatia	–	–	−1.47
Iceland	–	–	−1.59
Romania	–	–	−1.90

== International Labour Organization ==
Different countries by labour productivity (GDP per working hour) in 2025 using 2021 International dollar according to the International Labour Organization (ILO) modeled estimates and projections:

Countries by Labour productivity using the US dollar in viridis colourscale, according to International Labour Organization.

Country	Productivity
Ireland	164.7
Luxembourg	159.5
Norway	125.6
Singapore	100.4
Guyana	99.6
Netherlands	92.3
Denmark	92.2
Belgium	91.5
Austria	86.7
Switzerland	85.8
Sweden	83.9
United States	81.8
Macau	81.3
Finland	80.5
Germany	80.5
France	80.2
Italy	74.1
Australia	71.8
Taiwan	69.9
Canada	69.8
Spain	68.1
United Kingdom	67.3
Iceland	66.4
Saudi Arabia	65.3
Hong Kong	62.8
Israel	61.1
Puerto Rico	61.0
Qatar	60.3
Malta	50.7
Brunei	49.5
Slovenia	59.9
Croatia	58.7
Czech Republic	56.5
Lithuania	53.6
Portugal	52.9
Japan	52.7
New Zealand	51.4
Estonia	51.3
Romania	50.7
Bahrain	49.3
Poland	48.8
Greece	48.8
South Korea	47.9
Slovakia	47.4
Hungary	45.3
Latvia	45.3
Panama	43.6
Russia	43.2
Kazakhstan	41.5
United Arab Emirates	41.2
Turkey	40.9
Cyprus	38.2
Uruguay	38.0
Bulgaria	37.2
Iraq	35.7
Bahamas	35.1
Chile	34.4
North Macedonia	34.0
Argentina	33.8
Gabon	33.0
Kuwait	32.9
Trinidad and Tobago	31.9
Oman	31.6
Belarus	31.5
Montenegro	31.3
Malaysia	30.4
Mauritius	29.9
Serbia	29.8
Georgia	29.5
Costa Rica	29.1
Turkmenistan	27.9
Algeria	27.9
Djibouti	26.9
Dominican Republic	26.8
Egypt	26.4
Azerbaijan	26.4
Bosnia and Herzegovina	26.3
Armenia	26.0
Suriname	25.6
Saint Lucia	23.7
Iran	23.6
Libya	22.9
South Africa	22.8
Barbados	22.8
Mexico	22.7
Cuba	22.6
Eswatini	22.2
Botswana	22.2
Saint Vincent and the Grenadines	22.1
Brazil	21.2
China	20.6
Maldives	20.5
Tunisia	19.3
Mongolia	19.0
Fiji	19.0
Albania	18.7
Colombia	18.3
Equatorial Guinea	18.2
Sri Lanka	18.2
Thailand	17.9
Lebanon	17.6
Jordan	16.7
São Tomé and Príncipe	16.4
Paraguay	16.3
Namibia	15.9
Ecuador	15.6
Indonesia	15.5
Belize	15.3
Peru	15.3
Mauritania	15.1
Guatemala	15.0
Tonga	14.7
Morocco	14.0
Uzbekistan	13.7
Vietnam	12.7
Philippines	12.0
Moldova	12.0
El Salvador	11.8
Ghana	11.6
Bhutan	11.4
Cape Verde	11.4
India	10.8
Tajikistan	10.3
Nepal	9.7
Angola	9.5
Nicaragua	9.3
Bolivia	9.2
Jamaica	8.9
Bangladesh	8.8
Laos	8.7
Ivory Coast	8.3
Samoa	7.9
Western Sahara	7.4
Honduras	7.8
Republic of the Congo	7.5
Kenya	7.3
Pakistan	7.2
Nigeria	6.8
Guinea	6.8
Timor-Leste	6.6
Rwanda	6.3
Vanuatu	6.3
Sudan	6.2
Senegal	6.2
Papua New Guinea	6.1
Cameroon	6.1
Afghanistan	6.0
Somalia	6.0
Gambia	6.0
Myanmar	5.8
Zambia	5.0
Comoros	5.2
Cambodia	5.2
Ethiopia	4.7
Sierra Leone	4.4
Togo	4.3
Benin	4.2
Zimbabwe	4.2
Tanzania	3.9
Mali	3.7
South Sudan	3.6
Haiti	3.3
Lesotho	3.3
Guinea-Bissau	3.2
Uganda	3.2
Malawi	2.9
Burkina Faso	2.8
Solomon Islands	2.7
Eritrea	2.5
Democratic Republic of the Congo	2.4
Mozambique	2.2
Niger	2.1
Madagascar	1.8
Liberia	1.5
Central African Republic	1.5
North Korea	1.4
Burundi	0.9

== Historical development ==
Different countries by development of labour productivity since 1970 according to the OECD:

GDP per hour worked 1970–2022 (2015=100)
Country	2022	2020	2015	2010	2000	1990	1980	1970
Australia	103.3	103.1	100	92.2	80.9	66.0	60.3	51.4
Austria	105.0	103.7	100	95.6	83.0			
Belgium	101.8	104.0	100	96.4	88.1	71.6	58.3	38.4
Bulgaria		110.6	100	89.5	63.8			
Canada	104.1	111.4	100	94.7	86.7	73.1	66.6	56.1
Chile	110.6	119.4	100	89.6	72.5	43.4		
Colombia		134.2	100	89.0	77.3	80.8	73.3	
Costa Rica		128.1	100	86.9	68.1			
Croatia		97.3	100	88.5	75.2			
Czech Republic	108.0	107.8	100	91.7	66.0			
Denmark	106.1	107.7	100	94.2	85.6	70.0	54.5	39.2
Estonia	115.7	119.5	100	95.2	60.5			
Finland	106.1	103.3	100	98.9	86.5	63.3	46.8	30.2
France	99.8	103.5	100	95.7	87.5	72.9	54.3	36.6
Germany	106.5	104.0	100	94.9	87.1	70.9	56.2	38.8
Greece	99.8	99.0	100	112.8	99.9	85.1		
Hungary	116.6	112.1	100	97.5	69.3			
Iceland	110.3	108.8	100	96.1	69.6	61.6	54.9	33.2
Ireland	139.6	122.4	100	78.8	58.9	39.3	27.1	17.0
Israel	118.0	115.1	100	92.5	81.6	75.6		
Italy	101.9	103.0	100	98.9	99.1	84.6	70.9	47.5
Japan	104.1	104.5	100	94.1	84.5	68.0	45.8	30.2
South Korea	121.3	117.6	100	90.4	55.9	30.8	14.6	8.4
Latvia	128.9	116.1	100	87.4	54.1			
Lithuania	120.5	119.5	100	88.0	53.4			
Luxembourg	100.4	101.1	100	101.4	97.7	82.3	58.3	46.5
Mexico	92.4	98.2	100	94.4	99.1			
Netherlands	102.7	98.8	100	97.1	88.0	77.2	65.0	44.5
New Zealand	105.1	101.3	100	94.3	84.1	74.9	62.1	57.2
Norway	103.4	102.7	100	97.2	90.5	69.2	54.0	35.0
Poland	126.0	119.6	100	91.3	64.6			
Portugal	111.2	103.2	100	97.2	86.1	71.5	58.3	41.0
Romania		117.8	100	82.4	43.8			
Russia		112.3	100	95.0	63.5			
Slovakia	116.5	112.7	100	89.7	58.6			
Slovenia	113.5	111.5	100	96.4	76.3			
South Africa			100	89.7				
Spain	102.5	101.0	100	94.3	86.9	78.5	59.6	37.6
Sweden	108.3	103.3	100	95.0	79.6	63.1	56.2	44.2
Switzerland	111.0	107.0	100	97.8	86.4	77.6	70.8	57.8
Turkey	124.8	122.0	100	83.6	62.4	52.2	35.1	26.6
United Kingdom	104.3	104.6	100	97.7	87.1	66.8	53.8	40.4
United States	107.0	106.3	100	98.2	78.9	66.0	56.7	48.8

== See also ==
- Decoupling of wages from productivity
- Income distribution
- Labor share
- Median income
- Productivity
- Workforce productivity
- List of countries by average annual labor hours
- List of countries by average wage
- List of countries by minimum wage
- List of countries by GNI per capita growth
