= Minimum wage in Canada =

Under the Constitution of Canada, the responsibility for enacting and enforcing labour laws, including the minimum wage, rests primarily with the ten Provinces of Canada. The three Territories of Canada have a similar power, delegated to them by federal legislation. Some provinces allow lower wages to be paid to liquor servers and other gratuity earners or to inexperienced employees.

The Government of Canada has the constitutional authority to set minimum wages only for employees within federal jurisdiction, such as federal public servants and workers in industries that are under federal regulatory jurisdiction, such as banks, airlines and interprovincial railways. The federal government earlier set its own minimum wage rates for workers under its jurisdiction. In 1996, however, the federal minimum wage was redefined to be the general adult minimum wage rate of the province or territory where the work is performed. Following the 2021 budget, the Government of Canada reestablished a federal minimum wage for federally regulated industries on December 29, 2021.

== Demographics ==
In 2013, 50% of minimum wage workers were between the ages of 15 and 19; in 1997, it was 36%. 50.2% of workers in this age group were paid minimum wage in 2013, an increase from 31.5% in 1997. Statistics Canada notes that "youth, women and persons with a low level of education were the groups most likely to be paid at minimum wage."

According to one study, in 2019, 62% of people on minimum wage in Quebec worked part time, and 61% were aged 15 to 24.

== Minimum wage levels by jurisdiction ==
Assuming a 40-hour workweek and 52 paid weeks per year, the annual gross employment income of an individual earning the minimum wage in Canada is between C$31,200 (in Alberta) and C$41,953.60 (in Nunavut).

The following table lists the hourly minimum wages for adult workers in each province and territory of Canada. The provinces which have their minimum wages in bold allow for lower wages under circumstances which are described under the "Comments" heading.

Note: The following table can be sorted by Jurisdiction, Wage, or Effective date using the icon.

Jurisdiction	Wage (C$/h)	Effective date	Comments	Indexation Formula ("CPI" refers to Statistics Canada's Consumer Price Index — All-items)
Federal	18.15	April 1, 2026	Only for workers of federally-regulated sectors (i.e. banking, telecommunications, postal services). The provincial or territorial minimum wage applies if it is higher.	Each April 1, based on Canada CPI for the previous calendar year.
Alberta	**15.00**	October 1, 2018	Students under age 18 (working during a school break, summer holidays, or 28 hours or less per week while school is in session): $13.00	
British Columbia	18.25	June 1, 2026		Each June 1 (started in 2022 (Note: Indexation officially started in 2024. However, the actual increases in 2022 and 2023 correspond to applying the indexation formula.)), based on British Columbia CPI for the previous calendar year.
Manitoba	16.40	October 1, 2026	Workers in the construction industry (industrial, commercial, institutional, or heavy construction sectors): rates based on occupational classification	Each October 1, based on Manitoba CPI for the previous calendar year, unless the government decrees a freeze due to economic conditions. There were additional increases of $1.15 on October 1, 2022, and $0.65 on April 1, 2023.
New Brunswick	15.90	April 1, 2026		Each April 1, based on New Brunswick CPI for the previous calendar year. The minimum wage was lifted to $12.75 on April 1, 2022, and there was an additional increase of $1.00 on October 1, 2022.
Newfoundland and Labrador	16.35	April 1, 2026		Each April 1 (resumed in 2024), based on Canada CPI for the previous calendar year. There were additional increases of $0.50 on October 1, 2020, $0.25 on April 1, 2021, $0.25 on October 1, 2021, $0.50 on October 1, 2022 and $0.50 on October 1, 2023. On April 1, 2023, the minimum wage was increased by $0.80 in lieu of indexation.
Northwest Territories	17.20	September 1, 2026		Each September 1 (started in 2023), based on the changes in the Yellowknife CPI and in the average hourly wage in the Northwest Territories as measured by Statistics Canada for the previous calendar year.
Nova Scotia	17.00	October 1, 2026		Each April 1, based on Canada CPI for January through November of the previous calendar year plus, starting in 2023, 1%. (Note: The additional 1% officially started in 2024. However, the ad hoc increases in October 2022 and April 2023 combined for the same increase as applying the new formula in 2023.) In 2019 and 2021, an extra $0.30 was added before applying indexation. In 2020, the minimum wage was increased by $1.00 in lieu of indexation. There were early increases of $0.25 on October 1, 2022 and $0.50 on October 1, 2023. There was an additional increase of $0.80 on October 1, 2025, while $0.25 of the 2026 increase was delayed to October 1, 2026.
Nunavut	20.17	September 1, 2026		Each September 1 (started in 2025), based on the average of the changes in the Iqaluit CPI and in the average hourly wage (excluding overtime, for employees paid by the hour) in Nunavut as measured by Statistics Canada for the previous calendar year.
Ontario	**17.95**	October 1, 2026	Students under age 18 (working during a school break, summer holidays, or 28 hours or less per week while school is in session): $16.90; Homeworkers (employees who do paid work in their own homes - includes students and supersedes the student wage): $19.70	Each October 1 (resumed in 2020), based on Ontario CPI for the previous calendar year. There was an additional increase of $0.65 on January 1, 2022.
Prince Edward Island	17.30	October 1, 2026	To be increased to $17.60 on April 1, 2027	
Quebec	**16.60**	May 1, 2026	Workers receiving gratuities: $13.30	
Saskatchewan	15.70	October 1, 2026		Each October 1 (resuming in 2025), based on the average of the changes in the Saskatchewan CPI and in the average hourly wage in Saskatchewan as measured by Statistics Canada for the previous calendar year, subject to Cabinet approval. The minimum wage was lifted to $13.00 on October 1, 2022, and there were increases of $1.00 in lieu of indexation in 2023 and 2024.
Yukon	18.51	April 1, 2026		Each April 1, based on Whitehorse CPI for the previous calendar year. In 2019, an extra $0.90 was added before applying indexation. In 2020, an extra $0.75 was added after applying indexation. In 2021, an extra $1.35 was added on August 1.

== See also ==
- Minimum wage
- List of countries by minimum wage
