= Barbara Ehrenreich =

American writer and journalist (1941–2022)

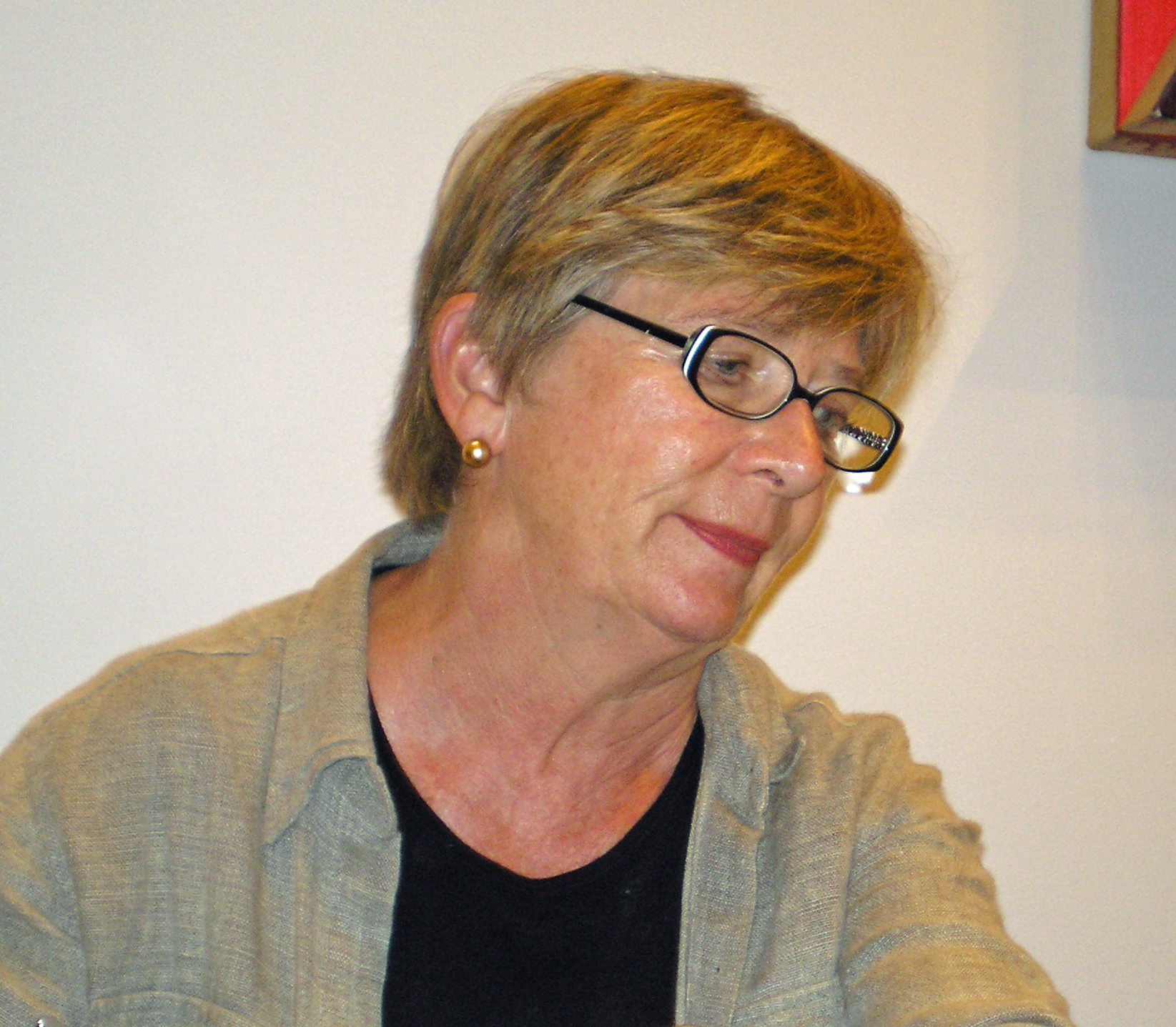
- Ehrenreich in 2006
- Born: Barbara Alexander; August 26, 1941; Butte, Montana, U.S.
- Died: September 1, 2022 (aged 81); Alexandria, Virginia, U.S.
- Education: Reed College (BA); Rockefeller University (PhD)
- Occupations: Social critic; journalist; author; activist
- Spouses: John Ehrenreich (m. 1966; div. 1977) Gary Stevenson (m. 1983; div. 1993)
- Children: Rosa Brooks; Ben Ehrenreich
- Writing career
- Genres: Nonfiction, investigative journalism
- Notable work: Nickel and Dimed
- Website: barbaraehrenreich.com

Barbara Ehrenreich (/ˈɛərənraɪk/, AIR-ən-rike; née Alexander; August 26, 1941 – September 1, 2022) was an American author and political activist. During the 1980s and early 1990s, she was a prominent figure in the Democratic Socialists of America. She was a widely read and award-winning columnist and essayist and the author of 21 books.

Ehrenreich is best known for her 2001 book Nickel and Dimed: On (Not) Getting By in America, a memoir of her three-month experiment surviving on a series of minimum-wage jobs. She was a recipient of a Lannan Literary Award and the Erasmus Prize.

== Early life ==
Ehrenreich was born to Isabelle (née Oxley) and Ben Howes Alexander in Butte, Montana, which she describes as then being "a bustling, brawling, blue collar mining town". In an interview on C-SPAN, she characterized her parents as "strong union people" with two family rules: "never cross a picket line and never vote Republican". In a talk she gave in 1999, Ehrenreich called herself a "fourth-generation atheist".

Later in life, she wrote that she rejected "the God of monotheism" because of the philosophical problem of a being that was all good and all powerful, when people were living with "all the misery he allowed or instigated". She had mystical experiences throughout her life, which she identified as belonging to a type of animism rather than theism.

"As a little girl", she told The New York Times in 1993, "I would go to school and have to decide if my parents were the evil people they were talking about, part of the Red Menace we read about in the Weekly Reader, just because my mother was a liberal Democrat who would always talk about racial injustice." Her mother was a deeply unhappy homemaker. Her father was a copper miner who went to the Montana School of Mines (renamed Montana Technological University in 2018) and then to Carnegie Mellon University. A high-functioning alcoholic, he strongly valued intelligence.

After her father graduated from the Montana School of Mines, the family moved to Pittsburgh, New York, and Massachusetts, before settling down in Los Angeles. He eventually became a senior executive at the Gillette Corporation. Her parents later divorced.

Ehrenreich studied physics at Reed College, switched to chemistry, graduating in 1963. Her senior thesis was Electrochemical oscillations of the silicon anode. In 1968, she enrolled in a theoretical physics Ph.D, but changed early on to cellular immunology and received her Ph.D at Rockefeller University.

In 1970, Ehrenreich gave birth to her daughter Rosa in a public clinic in New York. "I was the only white patient at the clinic, and I found out this was the health care women got," she told The Globe and Mail newspaper in 1987, "They induced my labor because it was late in the evening and the doctor wanted to go home. I was enraged. The experience made me a feminist."

== Career ==
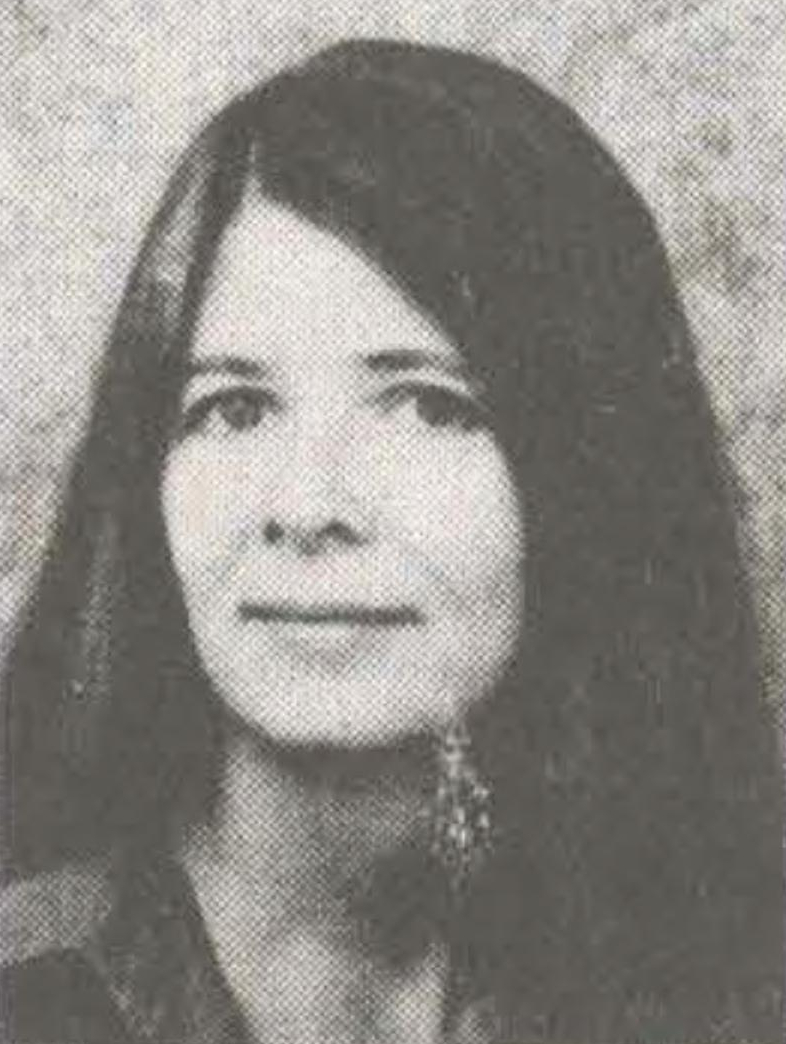
Ehrenreich, March 1982

After completing her doctorate, Ehrenreich did not pursue a career in science. Instead, she worked first as an analyst with the Bureau of the Budget in New York City and with the Health Policy Advisory Center, and later as an assistant professor at the State University of New York at Old Westbury.

In 1972, Ehrenreich began co-teaching a course on women and health with feminist journalist and academic Deirdre English. Through the rest of the seventies, Ehrenreich worked mostly in health-related research, advocacy and activism, including co-writing, with English, several feminist books and pamphlets on the history and politics of women's health. During this period she began speaking frequently at conferences staged by women's health centers and women's groups, by universities, and by the United States government. She also spoke regularly about socialist feminism and about feminism in general.

Together with her then husband, John Ehrenreich, she coined the term "professional-managerial class" in 1977.

Throughout her career, Ehrenreich worked as a freelance writer. She is arguably best known for her non-fiction reportage, book reviews and social commentary. Her reviews have appeared in The New York Times Book Review, The Washington Post, The Atlantic Monthly, Mother Jones, The Nation, The New Republic, the Los Angeles Times Book Review supplement, Vogue, Salon.com, TV Guide, Mirabella and American Film. Her essays, op-eds and feature articles have appeared in Harper's Magazine, The New York Times, The New York Times Magazine, Time, The Wall Street Journal, Life, Mother Jones, Ms., The Nation, The New Republic, the New Statesman, In These Times, The Progressive, Working Woman, and Z Magazine.

Ehrenreich served as founder, advisor or board member to a number of organizations including the National Women's Health Network, the National Abortion Rights Action League, the National Mental Health Consumers' Self-Help Clearinghouse, the Nationwide Women's Program of the American Friends Service Committee, the Brooklyn-based Association for Union Democracy, the Boehm Foundation, the Women's Committee of 100, the National Writers Union, the Progressive Media Project, FAIR's advisory committee on women in the media, the National Organization for the Reform of Marijuana Laws, and the Campaign for America's Future.

Between 1979 and 1981, she served as an adjunct associate professor at New York University and as a visiting professor at the University of Missouri at Columbia and at Sangamon State University (Now University of Illinois, Springfield.) She lectured at the University of California, Santa Barbara, was a writer-in-residence at the Ohio State University, Wayne Morse chair at the University of Oregon, and a teaching fellow at the graduate school of journalism at the University of California, Berkeley. She was a fellow at the New York Institute for the Humanities, the John Simon Guggenheim Memorial Foundation, the Institute for Policy Studies, and the New York-based Society of American Historians.

In 2000, Ehrenreich endorsed the presidential campaign of Ralph Nader; in 2004, she urged voters to support John Kerry in the swing states.

In February 2008, she expressed support for then-Senator Barack Obama in the 2008 U.S. presidential campaign.

In 2001, Ehrenreich published her seminal work, Nickel and Dimed: On (Not) Getting By in America. Seeking to explore whether people can subsist on minimum wage in the United States, she worked "undercover" in a series of minimum-wage jobs, such as waitress, housekeeper, and Wal-Mart associate, and reported on her efforts to pay living expenses with the low wages paid by those jobs (an average of $7 per hour). She concluded that it was impossible to pay for food and rent without working at least two such jobs. Nickel and Dimed became a bestseller and admirers regard the book as "a classic of social justice literature." Ehrenreich founded the Economic Hardship Reporting Project with one main purpose: support immersive reporting on the working poor, in the manner of Ehrenreich's own Nickel and Dimed.

Filling in for a vacationing Thomas Friedman as a columnist with The New York Times in 2004, Ehrenreich wrote about how, in the fight for women's reproductive rights, "it's the women who shrink from acknowledging their own abortions who really irk me" and said that she herself "had two abortions during my all-too-fertile years".

In her 1990 book of essays, The Worst Years of Our Lives, she wrote that "the one regret I have about my own abortions is that they cost money that might otherwise have been spent on something more pleasurable, like taking the kids to movies and theme parks."

In 2005, The New Yorker called her "a veteran muckraker".

In 2006, she founded United Professionals, an organization described as "a nonprofit, non-partisan membership organization for white-collar workers, regardless of profession or employment status. We reach out to all unemployed, underemployed, and anxiously employed workers—people who bought the American dream that education and credentials could lead to a secure middle class life, but now find their lives disrupted by forces beyond their control."

In 2009, she wrote Bright-sided: How Positive Thinking Is Undermining America (published in the UK as Smile Or Die: How Positive Thinking Fooled America and the World), which investigated the rise of the positive thinking industry in the United States. She included her own experience after being told that she had breast cancer as a starting point in the book. In this book, she brought to light various methods of what Nobel physicist Murray Gell-Mann called "quantum flapdoodle".

Beginning in 2013, Ehrenreich was an honorary co-chair of the Democratic Socialists of America, and served as such until the position was abolished in 2017. She also served on the NORML board of directors, the Institute for Policy Studies board of trustees and the editorial board of The Nation. She has served on the editorial boards of Social Policy, Ms., Mother Jones, Seven Days, Lear's, The New Press, and Culturefront, and as a contributing editor to Harper's.

== Works ==
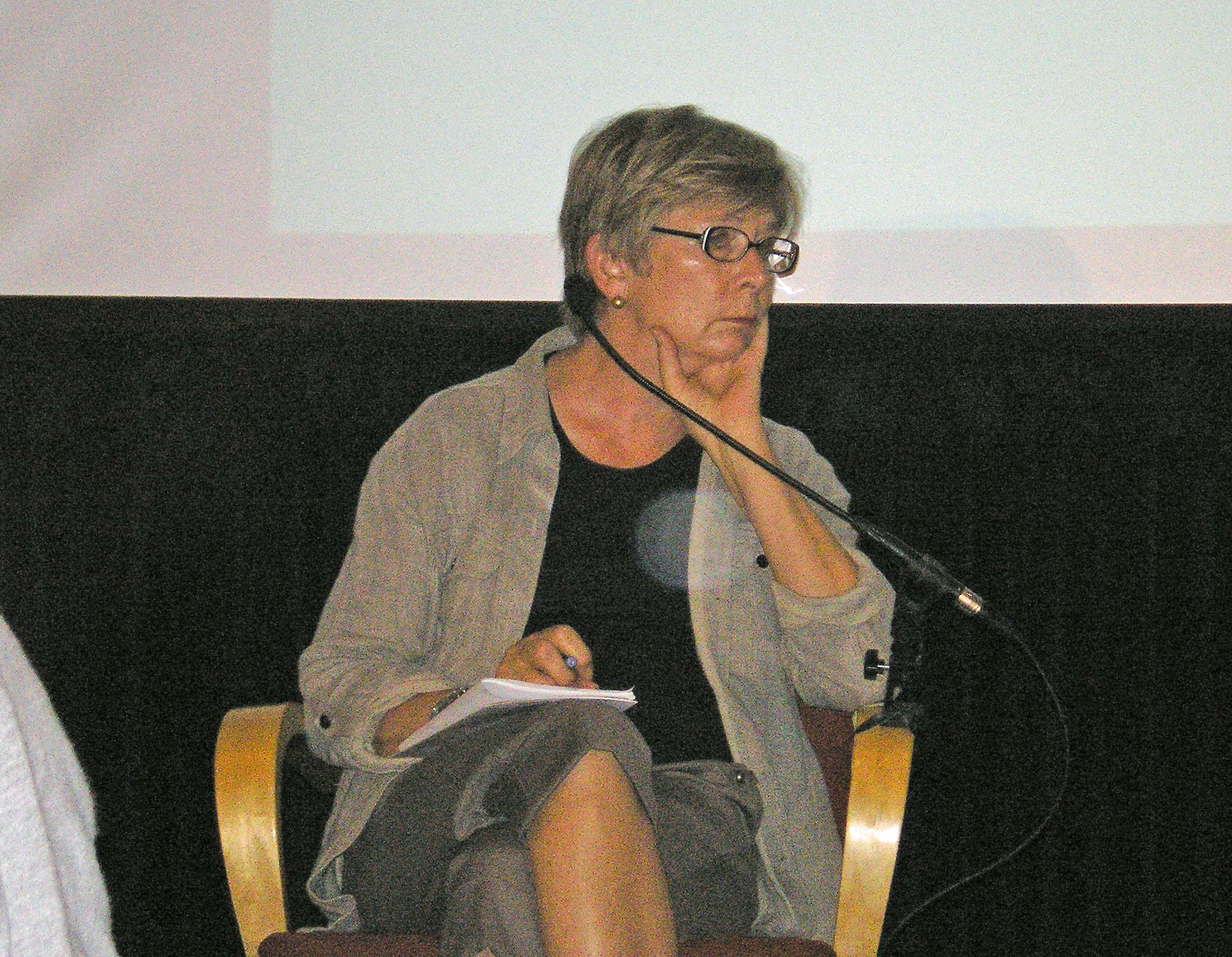
Ehrenreich at a New York Times discussion

=== Nonfiction ===
- Ehrenreich, Barbara; Ehrenreich, John (1969). Long March, Short Spring: The Student Uprising at Home and Abroad. Monthly Review Press. ISBN 9780853450863. (with John Ehrenreich)
- Ehrenreich, Barbara (1971). The American Health Empire: Power, Profits, and Politics. Knopf Doubleday Publishing. ISBN 9780394714530. (with John Ehrenreich and Health PAC)
- Ehrenreich, Barbara; English, Deirdre (1972). Witches, Midwives, and Nurses: A History of Women Healers. Feminist Press. ISBN 0912670134. (with Deirdre English)
- Ehrenreich, Barbara; English, Deirdre (1973). Complaints and Disorders: The Sexual Politics of Sickness. Feminist Press at CUNY. ISBN 9781558616950. (with Deirdre English)
- Ehrenreich, Barbara; English, Deirdre (1978). For Her Own Good: Two Centuries of the Experts' Advice to Women. Anchor Press. ISBN 9780385126502. (with Deirdre English)
- Fuentes, Annette; Fuentes, Carlos; Ehrenreich, Barbara (1983). Women in the Global Factory. South End Press. ISBN 9780896081987.
- Ehrenreich, Barbara (1983). The Hearts of Men: American Dreams and the Flight from Commitment. Anchor Press/Doubleday. ISBN 9780385176149.
- Ehrenreich, Barbara; Hess, Elizabeth; Jacobs, Gloria (1986). Re-Making Love: The Feminization of Sex. Anchor Press/Doubleday. ISBN 9780385184984. (with Elizabeth Hess and Gloria Jacobs)
- Block, Fred L.; Cloward, Richard A.; Piven, Frances Fox (1987). The Mean Season: Attack on the Welfare State. Pantheon Books. ISBN 9780394744506. (with Fred L. Block, Richard A. Cloward, and Frances Fox Piven)
- Ehrenreich, Barbara (1989). Fear of Falling: The Inner Life of the Middle Class. Pantheon Books. ISBN 9780394556925.
- Ehrenreich, Barbara (1990). The Worst Years of Our Lives: Irreverent Notes from a Decade of Greed. HarperPerennial. ISBN 9780060973841.
- Ehrenreich, Barbara (1995). The Snarling Citizen: Essays. Farrar, Straus and Giroux. ISBN 9780374266486.
- Ehrenreich, Barbara (1997). Blood Rites: Origins and History of the Passions of War. DIANE Publishing Company. ISBN 9780756754389.
- Ehrenreich, Barbara (2001). Nickel and Dimed: On (Not) Getting By In America. Macmillan. ISBN 9780805063882.
- Ehrenreich, Barbara; Hochschild, Arlie Russell (2003). Global Woman: Nannies, Maids, and Sex Workers in the New Economy. Macmillan. ISBN 9780805069952. (ed., with Arlie Hochschild)
- Ehrenreich, Barbara (2005). Bait and Switch: The (Futile) Pursuit of the American Dream. Macmillan. ISBN 9780805076066.
- Ehrenreich, Barbara (2007). Dancing in the Streets: A History of Collective Joy. Macmillan. ISBN 9780805057232.
- Ehrenreich, Barbara (2008). This Land is Their Land: Reports from a Divided Nation. New York: Metropolitan Books. ISBN 978-0-8050-8840-3. OCLC 182737659.
- Ehrenreich, Barbara (2009). Bright-Sided: How the Relentless Promotion of Positive Thinking has Undermined America. New York: Metropolitan Books. ISBN 978-0-8050-8749-9. OCLC 317928923. (UK: Smile Or Die: How Positive Thinking Fooled America and the World)
- Ehrenreich, Barbara (2014). Living with a Wild God: A Nonbeliever's Search for the Truth about Everything. New York: Twelve. ISBN 978-1-4555-0176-2. OCLC 856053601.
- Ehrenreich, Barbara (2018). Natural Causes: An Epidemic of Wellness, the Certainty of Dying, and Killing Ourselves to Live Longer. New York: Twelve. ISBN 978-1-4789-6126-0. OCLC 1039523821.
- Ehrenreich, Barbara (2020). Had I Known: Collected Essays. Twelve. ISBN 978-1-4555-4369-4.

Fiction

- Ehrenreich, Barbara (1993). Kipper's Game. Farrar, Straus, Giroux. ISBN 9780374181550.

=== Essays ===
- Ehrenreich, John and Barbara (1979). "The Professional-Managerial Class". Between Labor and Capitol. South End Press. ISBN 978-0896080386.
- "The Charge: Gynocide", investigative journalism about the Dalkon Shield in the third world, Mother Jones, November/December 1979.
- "Making Sense of La Difference", Time, 1992.
- "Burt, Loni and Our Way of Life", Time, September 20, 1993.
- "In Defense of Talk Shows", Time, December 4, 1995.
- "The New Creationism: Biology Under Attack" The Nation, June 9, 1997.
- ", Time, January 31, 2000.
- "Welcome to Cancerland", Harper's Magazine, November 2001. National Magazine Award finalist
- "A New Counterterrorism Strategy: Feminism", AlterNet, 2005.
- "Fight for Your Right to Party" Time, December 18, 2006.
- , The Guardian, February 22, 2009.
- "Is It Now a Crime to Be Poor?", The New York Times, August 9, 2009.
- "Are Women Getting Sadder? Or Are We All Just Getting a Lot More Gullible?", Guernica, October 13, 2009.
- "Smile! You've got cancer", The Guardian, January 2, 2010.
- Death of a Yuppie Dream – The Rise and Fall of the Professional-Managerial Class February 12, 2013.

== Awards ==
In 1980, Ehrenreich shared the National Magazine Award for excellence in reporting with colleagues at Mother Jones magazine for the cover story The Corporate Crime of the Century, about "what happens after the U.S. government forces a dangerous drug, pesticide or other product off the domestic market, then the manufacturer sells that same product, frequently with the direct support of the State Department, throughout the rest of the world."

In 1998 the American Humanist Association named her "Humanist of the Year".

In 2000, she received the Sidney Hillman Award for journalism for the Harper's article "Nickel and Dimed", which was later published as a chapter in her book of the same title.

In 2002, she won a National Magazine Award for her essay "Welcome to Cancerland: A mammogram leads to a cult of pink kitsch", which describes Ehrenreich's own experience of being diagnosed with breast cancer, and describes what she calls the "breast cancer cult," which "serves as an accomplice in global poisoning – normalizing cancer, prettying it up, even presenting it, perversely, as a positive and enviable experience."

In 2004, she received the Puffin/Nation Prize for Creative Citizenship, awarded jointly by the Puffin Foundation of New Jersey and The Nation Institute to an American who challenges the status quo "through distinctive, courageous, imaginative, socially responsible work of significance".

In 2007, she received the "Freedom from Want" Medal, awarded by the Roosevelt Institute in celebration of "those whose life's work embodies FDR's Four Freedoms".

Ehrenreich received a Ford Foundation award for humanistic perspectives on contemporary society (1982), a Guggenheim Fellowship (1987–88) and a grant for research and writing from the John D. and Catherine T. MacArthur Foundation (1995). She received honorary degrees from Reed College, the State University of New York at Old Westbury, the College of Wooster in Ohio, John Jay College, UMass Lowell and La Trobe University in Melbourne, Australia.

In November 2018, Ehrenreich received the Erasmus Prize by King Willem-Alexander of the Netherlands for her work in investigative journalism.

== Personal life and family ==
Ehrenreich had one brother, Ben Alexander Jr., and one sister, Diane Alexander. When she was 35, according to the book Always Too Soon: Voices of Support for Those Who Have Lost Both Parents, her mother died "from a likely suicide". Her father died years later from Alzheimer's disease.

Ehrenreich was married and divorced twice. She met her first husband, John Ehrenreich, during an anti-war activism campaign in New York City, and they married in 1966. He is a clinical psychologist, and they co-wrote several books about health policy and labor issues before divorcing in 1977. In 1983, she married Gary Stevenson, a union organizer for the Teamsters. She divorced Stevenson in 1993.

Ehrenreich had two children with her first husband. Her daughter Rosa, born in 1970 and named after a great-grandmother and Rosa Luxemburg, is a Virginia-based law professor, national security and foreign policy expert and writer. Ehrenreich's son Ben, born in 1972, is a novelist and a journalist in Los Angeles. In 2026 he released a memoir / short stories collection, Hold Still, featuring stories and reflections written in the first few months after his mother's death. Many of the reminiscences are about his mother and his processing her death.

Ehrenreich was diagnosed with breast cancer in 2001, shortly after the release of her book Nickel and Dimed: On (Not) Getting By in America. This led to the award-winning article "Welcome to Cancerland," published in the November 2001 issue of Harper's Magazine. She was featured in the 2011 documentary Pink Ribbons, Inc.

Ehrenreich lived in Alexandria, Virginia, where she died from a stroke at a hospice facility on September 1, 2022. Her New York Times obituary called her an "Explorer of Prosperity's Dark Side" for her commentary on inequality in the United States.
