= Dancing in the Street (disambiguation) =

"Dancing in the Street" is a 1964 song by Martha and the Vandellas, later recorded by other artists

Dancing in the Street may also refer to:

- Dancing in the Street (album), a 1967 album by the Ramsey Lewis Trio
- Dancing in the Street: the Songs of Motown II, a 2006 album by Human Nature
- Dancing in the Streets: A History of Collective Joy, a 2006 book by Barbara Ehrenreich
- Dancing in the Street (TV series), a 1996 PBS/BBC television documentary series about the history of rock music (a.k.a. "Rock & Roll" in the US)
