= Nils Gilman =

Academic and author

Nils Gilman is an historian, futurist, and author who is Chief Operating Officer and Executive Vice President at the Berggruen Institute, a think tank based in Los Angeles. He holds a BA, an MA, and a doctorate in history from the University of California, Berkeley. From 2014 to 2017, he was Associate Chancellor at UC Berkeley. As an intellectual historian he is the author of Mandarins of the Future: Modernization Theory in Cold War America and Children of a Modest Star: Planetary Thinking for an Age of Crises. As a futurist, he is known as the cofounder with Rosa Brooks of the Transition Integrity Project. He is also a fellow at the Quincy Institute for Responsible Statecraft.

== Books ==
- Staging Growth. Modernization, Development, and the Global Cold War (2003)
- Mandarins of the Future: Modernization Theory in Cold War America (2004)
- Deviant Globalization: Black Market Economy in the 21st Century (2011)
- Children of a Modest Star: Planetary Thinking for an Age of Crises (2024)
