= Educational inequality in the United States =

History of educational inequality in the US, possible causes and solutions

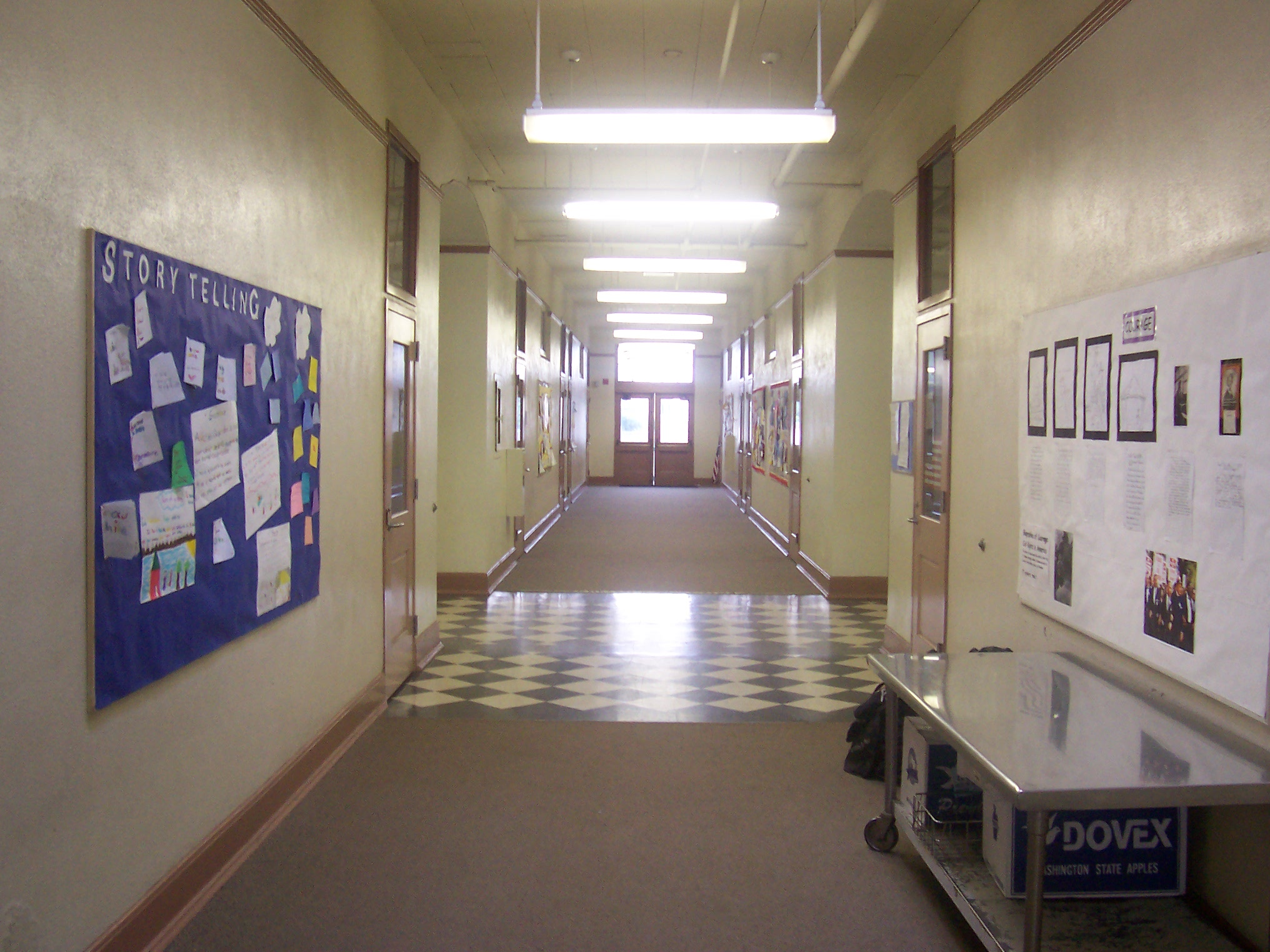
Hallway of a U.S. elementary school

Unequal access to education in the United States results in unequal outcomes for students. Disparities in academic access among students in the United States are the result of multiple factors including government policies, district funding, school choice, family wealth, parenting style, implicit bias towards students' race or ethnicity, and the resources available to students and their schools. Educational inequality contributes to a number of broader problems in the United States, including income inequality and increasing prison populations. Educational inequalities in the United States are wide-ranging, and many potential solutions have been proposed to mitigate their impacts on students.

== History ==
=== Colonial era ===
The earliest forms of education in the U.S. were primarily religious. Education in the 17th and 18th centuries aimed to teach the children of white colonists how to read the Bible and abide by Puritan values. For Indigenous children, the formal education was generally a means to forcibly assimilate them into white Puritan society and convert them to Christianity. Through this process of assimilation, which continued even after the colonial period, white settlers compelled Indigenous populations to give up cultural traditions, including their native languages. In the early 20th century, Indigenous children were forcibly taken from their families and enrolled in boarding schools. The purpose of this was to "civilize" and assimilate Indigenous communities into American society.

Historically, African Americans in the United States experienced trouble accessing quality education. In colonial times, many white people felt that if Black people, particularly enslaved Black people, were to become educated, they would start to challenge the systems of power that kept them oppressed. Southern states feared slaves would begin to act out against their slave owners or escape to northern states if they were educated. As a result, several states enacted laws that prohibited slaves from learning to read or write—commonly referred to as anti-literacy statutes. Although punishment varied from state to state, several southern states (Virginia, South Carolina, Mississippi, and Georgia) would criminally prosecute any slave who attempted to learn to read or write. In some cases, white people could also be punished for attempting to educate slaves. When some religious groups attempted to establish schools for African Americans, this was often met with severe opposition from white community members.

=== Civil War and Reconstruction era ===
The Civil War and the emancipation of slaves led to a push for more education opportunities for African Americans. Most Black people did not have access to education until the Reconstruction era following the Civil War, when public schools started to become more common.

Newly freed African Americans prioritized education, and many considered education an effective way to empower their communities. In southern states, Black residents engaged in collective action and collaborated with the Freedmen's Bureau, northern philanthropic organizations, and other white groups to ensure their access to public education. During the Reconstruction era, the enrollment of Black students began to expand because of the increased population of freed blacks.

Although Black students' enrollment rate continued increasing, there still evidence today of unequal achievement between white students and students from non-white racial identities, as well as between students from low socioeconomic backgrounds and students from higher socioeconomic backgrounds.

=== Jim Crow era ===
Under Jim Crow, schools were still segregated, which often resulted in Black schools receiving less public funding. This meant Black students were educated in worse facilities, with fewer resources, and with lower-paid teachers than their white counterparts. Furthermore, under Jim Crow, segregation had many negative effects that are still seen today. For example, because segregated schools had fewer resources, less experienced teachers, and overall less funding, there were lower expectations for student academic achievement. This academic achievement gap is something that is still seen in the 21st century (1).

Due to the nature of this academic environment, dropout rates for black students in segregated schools increased. This limited students' future employment opportunities and perpetuated a cycle of poverty and inequity. Additionally, fewer African-American students enrolled in school relative to their white counterparts, and fewer public schools were available to them. The majority of Black students did not continue their education past an elementary school level.

In Plessy v. Ferguson (1896), the United States Supreme Court decided that educational facilities were allowed to segregate white students from students of color as long as the educational facilities were considered equal. In practice, separate educational facilities meant fewer resources and access for Black and other minority students. On average, white students received 17–70% more educational expenditures than their Black counterparts. The first federal legal challenge of these unequal segregated educational systems occurred in the California case Mendez v. Westminster (1947), followed by Brown v. Board of Education (1954).

Brown v. Board of Education was a landmark Supreme Court case that declared segregation in public schools unconstitutional, with the court issuing this decision on May 17, 1954. The NAACP brought this case to challenge segregation in Kansas, which prohibited African Americans from attending white schools. The court held that segregation in public schools violated the Equal Protection Clause of the Fourteenth Amendment, which guarantees all citizens the same protection under the law. It held that segregation perpetuated feelings of inferiority among African-American children and hindered their ability to learn. The court therefore ordered schools to integrate. The Brown decision served as a catalyst for the civil rights movement. (Brown V Board of Ed)

=== Integration ===
In the United States, integration is the process of ending race-based segregation within public and private schools, and it is generally referred to in the context of the Civil Rights Movement. Integration has historically been employed as a method for reducing the achievement gap that exists between white students and students of color in the United States. Students in integrated schools also learn to be more accepting of others, which has been shown to reduce race-based prejudice.

Studies conducted in schools across the country have found that racial integration of schools is effective in reducing the achievement gap. In 1964, following the Civil Rights Act, the United States Congress commissioned sociologist James Coleman to direct and conduct a study on school inequality in the U.S. The report, known colloquially as the Coleman Report, was a landmark study in the field of sociology and education. The report detailed the extreme levels of racial segregation in schools that still persisted in the Southern United States despite the ruling of the Supreme Court in Brown v. Board of Education. Coleman found that Black students benefited greatly from learning in mixed-race schools. Therefore, he argued that busing Black students to white school districts to integrate the schools would be more effective in reducing the Black student's disadvantages compared to increasing in funding, which, according to the report, had little impact on student achievement. These findings would serve as an influential factor in the creation of the practice known as desegregation busing.

== Factors contributing to inequalities ==
A meta-analysis by MacCann and others (2019) indicates that at least 73.9% (100% - 26.1%) of variation in academic performance remains to be explained after accounting for intelligence, conscientiousness (i.e. persistent effort and organization), and emotional intelligence. The following are other factors that may explain the remaining variability in academic performance.

=== Race ===
Race is often a big contributor to educational inequalities, and it can explain the widening achievement and discipline gaps between white students and students of color. Implicit bias and stereotyping perpetuate systemic injustices and lead to unequal opportunities.

Race influences teachers' expectations and, in turn, influences achievement results. A 2016 study showed that non-Black teachers had much lower expectations of Black students than Black teachers who evaluated the same student. White teachers were 12% less likely to think the student would graduate from high school and 30% less likely to think they would graduate from college. Previous studies have demonstrated the importance of teachers' expectations: students whose teachers believe they are capable of high achievement tend to do better (Pygmalion effect). Another study found that white teachers were more likely to give constructive feedback on essays if they believed the student who wrote it was white. Essays perceived to be written by Black or Latino students were given more praise and less guidance on how to improve their writing. One reason for this lack of quality feedback could be that teachers do not want to appear racist so they grade Black students more easily; however, this is detrimental and can lead to lower achievement over time.

One study examined how implicit bias affects students of color, finding that white teachers who gave lessons to Black students had greater anxiety and delivered less clear lectures. They played recordings of these lectures to non-Blacks students who then performed just as badly, showing that achievement was not a result of the students' ability but rather the teachers' implicit bias.

Non-Asian minority students often do not have equal access to high-quality teachers, which can be an indication for how well a student will perform. However, there has been conflicting research on how large the effect truly is. Some claim having a high-quality teacher is the biggest predictor of academic success, while another study states that inequalities are largely caused by other factors.

Moreover, a study from the Educational Longitudinal Study of 2002 showed that two teachers who teach the same students can disagree on the expectations of the student's academic career and, in the case of African-American students, the belief in question was that they will achieve less academically. This study found that African-American teachers have greater expectations for African-American children succeeding academically than non-African-American teachers. Additionally, these disparities were more pronounced in white male teachers of African-American female students.

It is important that more information is gathered about teachers' implicit biases because they can affect the way they teach students. Students of color are affected by these biases, so more research on racial disparities in education will help determine the role of bias in the educational system.

There is a cultural disconnect between white teachers and African-American students that makes it hard for African-American students to learn effectively because they do not understand their teacher's instruction style, which is notably different from African-American adults' instruction style. African-American teachers know the instruction style that African-American students are used to, which makes it easier for these students to learn from them. Additionally, African-American children often look to their teachers in school as a guide to help them succeed in life because their parents and other family members may not be able to demonstrate that same support. White teachers may not understand the need for extra support because traditionally white, middle-class students have family support that does not require white teachers to be role models and guides. It is important that teachers understand this discrepancy in family life between African-American children and white children so that they can support students effectively. However, inequality in education can diminish if teachers of different ethnicities and races are taught how to support students of different ethnicities and races. If teachers are taught more about their implicit biases and how to deal with them then, they will be able to teach students more fairly.

Strategies that white teachers can implement to support African-American students properly can include having an authoritative and disciplined style, which includes:

- Maintaining control of the classroom
- Viewing themselves as an additional parent, which means caring for them as their own children
- Promoting interpersonal relationships, as well as protective instincts of the children's well being
- Being racially conscious, which means having multicultural class materials even if discussions about race are not directly part of the lesson

These strategies are subtle ways that can help white teachers connect to African-American students in a more effective way and help students learn better.

Another key recommendation is to hold African-American students to the same academic levels and expectations as white students. Expecting the same level of greatness helps African-American students develop more successfully and confidently in their academic journey.

==== White supremacy in curriculum ====
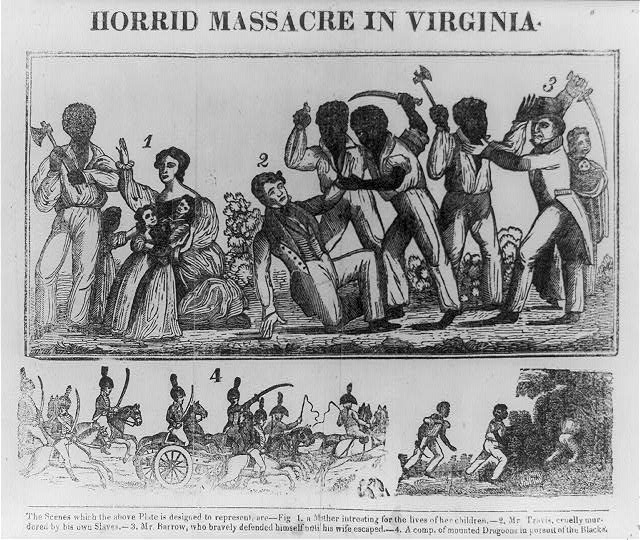
19th century woodcut depiction of the Southampton Insurrection led by Nat Turner. While one history textbook covered the White casualties from the revolt, it did not cover the much larger number of casualties inflicted on enslaved Black Americans by whites afterward.

A range of scholars beginning at least the late 19th century has produced arguments that white supremacy exists in U.S. school curriculum, oftentimes to the detriment of non-white students' learning outcomes and the whole of American society. In the early 20th century, Historian Carter G. Woodson argued that U.S. education indoctrinated students into believing white people were superior, and Black people inferior, by showcasing white accomplishments and effectively denying that Black people had made any contributions to society or had any potential. In his experience, the racial message contained in schools' teachings was so strong that he claimed, "there would be no lynching if it did not start in the schoolroom." More recent scholarship still points to the overrepresentation of perspectives, histories, and accomplishments associated with European and White American culture, and the simultaneous underrepresentation of the perspectives, histories, and accomplishments of non-White Americans. Swartz (1992) and King (2014) explain that school curriculum has been structured by what they call a master script. Swartz defines this term as an account of the reality that advances and reaffirms white people's dominance in American society through the centering of white achievements and experiences, while consistently omitting, simplifying, and "distorting" non-white peoples (p. 341–342).

As an example, Powell and Frankenstein (1997) draw attention to Eurocentrism in the field of mathematics, arguing that the critical advancements made in societies outside of Europe, including Egypt, Mesopotamia, Persia, India, and China, are very frequently ignored in the narrative that the Ancient Greeks pioneered most math, which Europe then later salvaged after the Dark Ages. In her analysis of American history textbooks, Swartz (1992) highlights a repeated failure to provide meaningful information about Black Americans, namely throughout slavery, Reconstruction, Jim Crow, and the civil rights movement. Instead, textbooks often frame slavery and other issues in ways that encourage sympathy with white Americans, including slave-holders. Multiple textbooks include discussions of slave revolts in terms of the damage they caused white people instead of focusing on the need of enslaved Black people to overthrow the system of slavery (pp. 346–347). Other scholars, including Brown (2014), Elson (1964), Huber et al. (2006), Mills (1994), and Stout (2013) have argued that Black people, Native Americans, East Asian and Southeast Asian Americans, and Mexican Americans have been subject to marginalization, silencing, or misrepresentation in U.S. school curriculum.

Other scholars have argued that white (and middle-class) cultural norms are employed in the creation and delivery of school curriculum, to the detriment of students who do not have the same cultural background. Crawford (1992) writes that white American values such as "competition," "confrontation" structure class proceedings when students with different upbringings may be uncomfortable with or confused by these conventions. The same is true, she argues, for activities such as group work and engaging in dialogues with the teacher, rather than perhaps receiving information silently. Crawford also asserts that schools often do not look to conform to their students' specific life circumstances, thereby obstructing these students' educational paths (p. 21). Hudley and Mallinson (2012) discuss the use of "standardized English" in schools and how that impacts students, who speak a wide range of types of English. "Standardized English" refers to the version of English used in American academia and professional settings, which is also the type of English spoken by middle-class white Americans (pp. 11–12). The authors cite a consensus among linguists that there is no objective standard for English, and that, in reality, standardized English has been judged to be "standard" because it is what is spoken by people who wield power in society (p. 12). They emphasize that children who grow up speaking standardized English enjoy linguistic privilege when both when learning how to read and write, and when interacting with teachers. At the same time, students who grow up speaking with different English conventions suffer stigmatization due to their speech patterns and experience the added difficulty of having to learn a whole new set of language conventions while participating in "normal" schoolwork (p. 36). The authors assert that, by holding minority students to historically White English norms, schools often communicate that these students must make themselves whiter to be seen as acceptable. This is potentially true for African-American Vernacular-speaking students in particular (p. 36).

===== Effects =====
Crawford (1992), and Hudley and Mallinson (2012) state that non-white students may struggle in school and in life due to marginalization of their races and cultures in the curriculum. Other scholars have raised concerns about the lack of opportunities for non-white students to see themselves as having academic or professional potential. These authors assert that the lack of meaningful use and discussion of non-white perspectives, practices, and feats may lead minority students to feel disillusioned with school, disengage from learning, and doubt their own capabilities. In a study on internalized racism, Huber et al. (2006) find that curriculum underrepresents minorities and that this may contribute to ingrained senses of racial inferiority (p. 193).

Citing the aforementioned issues, Hudley and Mallinson (2012), and Fryer (2006) discuss the development of a stigmatizing label of "acting white" that some Black and Hispanic students use. According to these authors, the phenomenon of "acting white" comes from seeing academic success as coming hand in hand with whiteness or, for some non-white students, the abandonment of their original cultures in order to succeed in a white-culture-normative society. In this case, academic success is coupled with accepting Eurocentric practices in schools, which means self-disenfranchisement. This social stigma of "acting white" may discourage striving for academic success among Black and Hispanic students. Fryer (2012) explains that Hispanic students' popularity starts to decline relative to their grade point average (GPA) after they attain a 2.5. For Black students, popularity declines at a 3.5 GPA. For white students, this relationship does not appear to exist.

White supremacy in curriculum may contribute to the perpetuation of white supremacy in society in general, affecting future generations. Huber et al. (2006) note that Euro- or white-centric curriculum can contribute to normalizing racial inequality and tolerating white dominance (p. 193). Brown and Brown (2010) also state that, if schools continue not teaching about systemic racism, students will grow up to be "apathetic" about Black victims of mass incarceration and gun-related violence, as well as the disproportionate suffering Black Americans experience after natural disasters (p. 122).

=== Socioeconomic status ===
Ivy-Plus admissions rates vary with the income of the students' parents, with the acceptance rate of the top 0.1% income percentile almost double that of other students.

In the United States, a family's socioeconomic status (SES) has a significant impact on the child's education. The parents' level of education, income, and career attainment combine to determine the level of difficulty their children will face in school. This milieu creates an inequality of learning between children from high-SES families and children from low-SES families. High-SES families can ensure their children receive a beneficial education while low-SES families are not usually able to ensure the same educational quality for their children. This results in children of less wealthy families performing less well in schools than children of wealthier families. There are several factors that contribute to this disparity; these factors narrow into two main subjects: resources and environment.

The type of environment a student lives in is a determinant of the education they receive. The environment a child is raised in shapes their perceptions of education. In low-SES homes, literacy is not stressed as much as it is in high-SES homes. It has been shown that wealthier parents spend more time talking to their children, which builds their vocabulary early on and enhances their literacy skills. In a study from the National Center for Education Statistics (NCES), outside school, parental involvement grows exponentially as the household income grows. It shows that parents making $100,000 a year or more had a 75% chance of telling their child a story, whereas a family making $20,000 is had only a 60% probability of the same. These types of activities are what leads to brain development and kids with in lower-SES households are statistically receiving less. Low-SES children are also exposed to a more stressful environment than higher-SES children. They worry about problems a lack of money in the household could create (such as bills and food). This stress manifests itself all throughout a student's learning career. Statistically, students coming from higher-poverty areas graduate college at nearly half the rate of students from a lower-poverty school.

There is great variation in the resources available to children in schools. Higher-SES families can invest more into their children's education. This ability manifests in the popular tactic of shopping for school districts: parents plan where they are going to live based on the quality of the school district. They can afford to live in areas where other high-SES families reside, and this congregation of high-SES families produces a well-funded school district. These families are capable of directly investing in their children's education by donating to the school. Having access to such funds gives the schools capacity to have high-caliber resources such as experienced teachers, technology, good nutrition, clubs, sports, and books. If students have access to such resources, they are able to learn more effectively. Children of lower-SES families do not have these resources. The NCES study has an example of inequality related to home internet access by median income and race. It shows that, by a large margin, Black and Hispanic students have the least access to the internet along with those of the lowest median income quarter. These low-SES families settle down where there jobs are available, and are less able to "shop" for school districts. Clusters of low-SES families are typically located within worse school districts. The families are not in a position to donate to their children's school and the schools lack appropriate funding for quality resources. This results in schools that cannot compete with wealthier schools. However, recent political developments favor legal changes to these funding laws. For example, a court in Pennsylvania held the state's funding processes are failing to uphold the state's constitutional obligation to provide education.

==== Neighborhood effects ====
Neighborhoods play a significant effect on the development in adolescents and young adults. As a result, much research has studied how neighborhoods can explain a person's level of educational attainment.

Research has shown that an adolescent's neighborhood can significantly affect his or her life chances. Children from poorer neighborhoods are less likely to climb out of poverty compared to children who grow up in more affluent neighborhoods. In terms of education, students from high-SES neighborhoods have higher levels of school readiness and higher IQ levels. Studies have also shown that there are "links between neighborhood high SES and educational attainment" in regards to older adolescents. Children growing up in high-SES neighborhoods are more likely to graduate from high school and attend college compared to students growing up in low-SES neighborhoods. Living in a low-SES neighborhood has many implications in terms of education. Among them are "greater chances of having a child before age 18; lesser chances of graduating from high school; and earning lower wages as a young adult. Experiencing more neighborhood poverty as a child is also associated with a lower rate of college graduation."

The neighborhood effect is mitigated when students who grow up in low-SES neighborhoods move to high-SES neighborhoods. These students are more likely to reap the same benefits as students in high-SES neighborhoods and school systems; their chances of attending college are much higher than those who stayed in low-SES neighborhoods. One study done in Chicago placed African-American students in public housing in the suburbs as opposed to in the city. The schools in the suburbs generally received more funding and had mostly white students. Students who attended these schools "were substantially more likely to have the opportunity to take challenging courses, receive additional academic help, graduate on time, attend college, and secure good jobs."

=== Private vs. public education ===
There are several differences in how private schools operate compared to public schools. Public schools are funded by federal, state, and local sources with nearly half of their funding coming from local property taxes. Private schools are funded from resources outside of the government, which typically include a combination of student tuition, donations, fundraising, and endowments. Private school enrollment makes up about 10% of all K–12 enrollment in the U.S. (about 4 million students), while public school enrollment encompasses 56.4 million students.

Because private schools are funded outside of government channels, they often exercise more freedom in how they operate their schools. Many private schools choose to teach material outside of the state-mandated curriculum. They are also allowed to have religious affiliations and selection criteria for which students they accept. In contrast, public schools are not allowed to have religious ties and must accept any student geographically zoned in their area. There have been several arguments raised against private school systems. Some argue that they perpetuate elitist forms of education and have high barriers to entry, as tuition to private schools can be up to tens of thousands of dollars. For reference, the national average cost of private school tuition in the 2020–2021 school year was $11,004. Since several private schools have religious affiliations, there have also been arguments regarding potential bias and questionable standards in religious private schools.

Differences in private and public education can affect children's future achievement. Several studies point out that students who attend private schools are more likely to graduate from high school and attend college afterward. There have been studies indicating that areas with a homogeneous public education system have higher amounts of inter-generational social mobility. In comparison, private education systems can lead to higher inequality and less mobility. The National Longitudinal Survey of Youth has also noted that students who attend private schools tend to earn more in their careers compared to their public-school counterparts.

=== Language barriers ===
As of 2015, there were nearly 5 million English language learner (ELL) students enrolled in U.S. public schools and they are the fastest-growing student population in the U.S. About 73% of ELL students speak Spanish as their first language, although the most common language varies by state. Sixty percent of ELL students come from low-income families in which parents have very limited educational levels. Family income level and lack of English language skills are often two intertwined barriers that ELL students face.

Students who are not proficient in English are put at a serious disadvantage when compared to their peers. There is a strong association between English-language ability and the success of students in school. ELL students have disproportionately high dropout rates, low graduation rates, and low college completion rates.

A potential cause of ELL students' lack of achievement is communication difficulties that can arise between student and teacher. Many educators may treat students with low English proficiency as slow learners or intellectually disadvantaged. There is evidence that a potential consequence of this lack of understanding is a self-fulfilling prophecy: teachers treat students as less capable, then students internalize these expectations and underperform. These students may also feel a cultural conflict between their native language and English. Cultural differences may cause students to feel a rejection of their native culture or language, leading to a decrease in academic motivation. Most experts agree that it takes students around 5–7 years to learn academic English, which, in a school setting, can place ELL students behind their English-speaking classmates.

== Educational inequalities ==
K–12

Education at the K–12 level is important in setting students up for future success. However, in the United States, there are persisting inequalities in elementary, junior high, and high school that lead to many detrimental effects for low-income students of color.

K-12 levels are primarily funded by state and local governments, with a small percentage of federal investment. The Department of Education is a key public organization that administers federal programs, reinforce civil rights laws on schools, and collects meaningful educational data around the United States. However, this organization is not responsible for curricula or funding policy, since these are state and district responsibilities.

One indicator of inequality is that Black children are more likely to be placed in special education. Teachers are disproportionately identifying African-American students as having developmental disorders: Black students "are about 16% of the school-age population yet are 26% and 34% of children receiving services under the SED [serious emotional disturbances] and MMR [mild mental retardation] developmental delay categories." On the other hand, ADHD in Black children is more likely to go undiagnosed and, as a result, these students are often punished more severely than white students who have been recognized as having ADHD. One study shows that Black students with undiagnosed ADHD are seen as disruptive and more frequently removed from class, reducing their learning opportunities and increasing the chances they will end up in prison.

More evidence of inequality is that resources allocation and quality of instruction are much worse for African-American, Native American, and Latino students when compared to their white counterparts. An analysis by the Stanford University School of Education found that there is a high concentration of minority students in schools that receive fewer resources like books, laboratories, and computers. In addition, these schools often have larger student-to-teacher ratios and instructors with fewer qualifications and less experience. Unqualified and inexperienced teachers are less likely to adapt to different learning methods and less likely to implement higher-order learning strategies that constitute quality education. Students who are placed in gifted education often receive better instruction; it was discovered that Black children were 54% less likely to be placed in one of these programs and "were three times more likely to be referred for the programs if their teacher was Black rather than white."

According to multiple studies, African-American students are disadvantaged from the very beginning of elementary school. One survey reported that they have very high aspirations (much higher when compared to the white students) but usually face negative schooling experiences that discourage them. These disparities carry over into higher education and explain much of why many Black students choose not to pursue a degree.

Furthermore, in a 2006–2007 study by the Institute of Education Sciences, statistics show that Black, Hispanic, poor, and near-poor students made up 10% of the population of total students who attended public schools that did not meet Adequate Yearly Progress (AYP) standards.

Higher education

Higher education encompasses undergraduate and postgraduate schooling and usually results in obtaining a higher-paying job. Not only do Black and Hispanic people have less access to universities, they face many inequities while they attend and while applying to postgraduate programs. For most of history, Black Americans were not admitted into these institutions and were generally dissuaded from pursuing higher education. Even though laws have been enacted to make access to higher education more equal, racial inequalities today continue to prevent completely equal access.

One study found that the social environment of universities makes African Americans feel more isolated and less connected to the school. They observed that "African American students at White institutions have higher attrition rates, lower grade point averages, lower satisfactory relationships with faculty, lower enrollment into postgraduate programs, and greater dissatisfaction." Additionally, many researchers have studied stereotype threat—the idea that negative perceptions of race can lead to underperformance. One of these experiments done at Stanford University tested a group of African-American students and a group of white students with the same measured ability. However, the African Americans did worse when the test was presented as a measure of their intellect, but matched their white peers' performance when they were told the test did not reflect intellectual ability.

Other studies have analyzed the different majors that students choose and how these majors hold up in the job market. After analyzing data from 2005 to 2009, they saw that African Americans were less likely to major in a STEM-related field, which has a higher return on investment than the liberal arts. A 2018 study yielded similar results: white students are twice as likely to major in engineering than Black students, and Hispanic students are also underrepresented.

In regards to postgraduate study, Black students are less likely to be accepted into such programs after college. One possible reason is because they are not being recruited for doctoral programs and are looked upon less favorably if they received a degree from an HBCU (historically black colleges and universities).

=== Achievement gap ===
The achievement gap describes the inconsistencies in standardized test scores, rates of high school and college completion, and grade point average between different ethnic-racial groups in the United States. The achievement gap is significant because white students tend to achieve far more academically compared to Black and Latino students. Latino and Black students have some of the lowest college school completion rates in the United States. On average, they also have lower literacy rates in school and lag behind white students in terms of math and science proficiency. These discrepancies have long-term achievement effects on Latino and Black students.

African Americans and Mexicans lower than their socioeconomically advantaged or white counterparts on standardized tests and receive more punishments of explosion and suspension. Also, Black and Mexicans have an less of an advantage to do well academically. These achievement gaps are often assigned to academic opportunity gaps since socioeconomically disadvantaged, Black, and Latinx youth are systematically given fewer opportunities for positive academic trajectories (Cruz, 2021). Unfortunately, these setbacks are associated with poverty and neglect. Research has been studied that African Americans and Latinos are more likely to endure poverty than White Americans and Asians.

There are several factors that can explain the achievement gap. Among some of the most studied and popular theories are that predominantly Black/Latino schools are concentrated in low-SES neighborhoods that do not receive adequate resources to invest in their students' education (such as the ability to pay for qualified teachers) and that parental participation in Black and Latino families lags behind that of white families. Family influence is significant as shown in a study that demonstrated how high levels of parental involvement in low-income communities can actually assist in mitigating the achievement gap.

==== Standardized Testing ====
There is growing discussion on whether standardized testing is an equal tester of ability or learning, or if disparity between test scores for different groups is caused by inherent flaws in the testing process and origin. While the gap between Black and white test scores is decreasing, the average score black students receive is still below 75% of all white scores. Common explanations for this have been on poverty, segregation, and poor funding of schools. Research suggests that proficiency tests for teachers and reducing class sizes can improve test scores for both white and black students, and often black students benefit to an even greater extent when this is enacted.

=== Summer learning gap ===
An imbalance in resources at home creates a phenomenon called the summer learning gap. This refers to the impact of resources outside of school that influence a child's education progression. There is a troubling contrast between the growth in math skills over the summer between high-SES and low-SES children.

Higher-SES children are already ahead of the lower-SES children before grade school starts because of the amount of resources available to them at home. This may be due to their early introduction into literacy and higher vocabulary due to the higher amount of words they are exposed to. Also, the lower-SES children's access to books comes solely through school, and their reading skills are not developed at all at year one because they have not had sufficient exposure.

The two groups of children learn at the same rate only when they are in school. The higher-SES students are still above the lower-SES students because the rate of learning of the children changes radically during the summer. In the summer, the higher-SES children show a very slight increase in learning. This is due to their access to various resources during the summer months. Their families are able to enroll them in summer enrichment activities such as summer camp. These activities ensures that children are still being educationally stimulated even when not in school. While at the same time, lower-SES students show evidence of a slight decrease in learning during the summer months. Lower-SES students do not have the same opportunities as the higher-SES students. During the summer, these students are not focused on learning. Their parents do not enroll them in as many summer activities because they cannot afford them, so the children have more autonomy and freedom in those three months. They are concerned with having fun, and forget some of what they gained during the school year. This continuing disparity from year to year results in an approximately 100-point difference in their math scores after six years of school.

==== Summer learning gap programs ====
Summer programs have been used as a method to decrease the achievement gap in American public schools. Many programs are free or at a reduced cost, which make them more accessible. There are a wide range of programs provided by local school districts, non-profit organizations, or organizations that receive federal funding to operate. Some programs are required or mandated by school districts. There are also costly programs that only students higher-SES students are able to attend. Programs usually last for several weeks over the summer. There are programs students can participate in at home. The majority of summer programs focus on improving math and reading skills because those are the two subjects students struggle with the most according to national test scores. Local school districts often provide summer reading programs with the intention of boosting students' interest in books. Schools provide the books, which make them accessible. Summer programs that focus on reducing the summer learning gap focus on retaining the knowledge that students have gained through the academic year. Programs have a lot more instructional time to help boost students' skills. Since these programs are able to have smaller class sizes, focus on individual students' needs, and provide students with a lot more attention, they foster a better learning environment.

Access to programs is a concern. Students who might not have access to summer programs may struggle more the following academic year. Lack of access also increases the achievement gap that already exists between students from lower and higher SES. While there are programs that are low-cost or free, there is also the concern that the types of programs that come with a fee are better quality and provide a lot more to the students from higher-income backgrounds.

The effectiveness of summer programs has been a growing concern. Programs that have produce positive results are available to lower-SES students. While there are sufficient data that summer learning programs can be effective in some ways, there are also data showing it takes a while for these types of programs to actually make an impact on students.

=== Discipline gap ===
The discipline gap refers to the overrepresentation of minority students among the differing rates of school discipline, especially in comparison to white students. Shifts in disciplinary policy have been attributed to the discipline gap, with African-American students bearing the brunt of the subsequent inequalities. In recent decades, disciplinary policies meant to strengthen school control over social interactions, such as through the use of zero-tolerance, have been implemented, leading to a large increase of sanctions levied against students. Studies have also suggested that, for Black students, the likelihood of suspension increases along with a rise in the population of Black students in a school's student body, as well as an increased likelihood of facing harsher punishments for behavior. Additional research has suggested that African-American students are both differentially disciplined and more likely to face harsher punishments relative to white students. Furthermore, minority students are more often accused of subjective, rather than objective, disciplinary infractions. Other minority demographics, such as Latino and Native American students, face similar, disproportionately high rates of school discipline—though these findings have been less consistent relative to data about Black students.

Explanations for the cause of the discipline gap are wide-ranging, as both broad factors and individual actions have been considered as potential sources. On a macro level, things like school culture have been suggested to be meaningfully associated with differences in suspension rates. Conversely, a significant amount of research has been conducted on the micro-interactions that take place between teachers and students. Teachers' self-efficacy and confidence inherently influence their interactions with students, which can then shape their methods of classroom management and propensity to discipline students. Moreover, preexisting assumptions or biases about students can also influence a teacher's treatment of their students. Additional issues, such as cultural differences, have been identified as further complications in the relationship between teachers and students. Most notably, cultural misunderstandings between white teachers and Black students have been found to result in disproportionate disciplinary action against Black students. Research has also indicated that the risk of cultural mishaps may be more pronounced among inexperienced or new teachers..

==== Zero-tolerance policies ====
Zero-tolerance policies, also known as no-tolerance policies, were originally instituted to prevent school shootings by strictly prohibiting the possession of dangerous weapons in schools. As these policies have proliferated nationally, research has shown that schools with large populations of minority students tend to utilize zero-tolerance more frequently relative to other schools, often in addition to the use of punitive disciplinary procedures. Over time, these policies have gradually evolved from their original purpose and shifted towards meeting school-specific disciplinary goals, which has inadvertently contributed to the discipline gap. In many schools, subjective misbehaviors—like disrupting the class or acting disrespectfully—have become offenses that are addressed by zero-tolerance. This has resulted in negative consequences for minority students, as research has indicated that minorities tend to be disproportionately disciplined for subjective transgressions. Additionally, zero-tolerance punishments can lead to student referrals to the juvenile detention system, even for offenses that may otherwise be considered minor. The connection between zero-tolerance and juvenile detention has also been linked to other elements of the discipline gap, such as school-based arrests. Despite comprising approximately 15% of students, African Americans account for 50% of the arrests in schools. While researchers have attributed many disciplinary policies to this disparity, zero-tolerance has been noted as a significant contributing factor.

==== Exclusionary policies ====
Exclusionary discipline policies refer to the removal, or 'exclusion,' of students from the classroom—typically in the form of suspensions or expulsions. The national emphasis on suspensions and other exclusionary policies has been partially attributed to the rise of zero-tolerance, as suspensions have become a favored method of punishing students and broadly applied to various infractions. Even though suspensions are a common form of discipline, suspension rates for all student demographics—except African Americans—have declined. The increase in the suspension rate for African Americans has followed a trend that was identified in the 1970s, when Black students were estimated to be twice as likely to receive a suspension, and that has continued to increase over time. Studies have also indicated that, particularly among female Black students, darker skin tones may raise the risk of receiving a suspension. In addition to being more likely to receive a suspension, studies have shown that Black students tend to receive longer suspensions. As a result of these disparities, research has signaled that students of color perceive the gap among suspension rates as the result of intentional discrimination, rather than as efforts to appropriately enforce school rules.

Exclusion from the classroom has been found to be detrimental to a student's academic performance. Research has shown that engagement in the classroom is positively related to student achievement, and, given that suspensions can last for several days, this can greatly influence the risk of academic failure—particularly among groups like Black male students, who are disproportionately suspended. The added impact of suspensions on Black students has been noted as compounding other issues facing them, such as higher disengagement from classes, that contribute to the racial achievement gap. Academic performance is further affected by the largely unsupervised time spent outside of the classroom, which can bring students in contact with additional youth who have been suspended or expelled from schools. Suspensions stay on a student's school record, which can shape academic or personal expectations for the student when seen by future teachers or administrators. Additional consequences arising from exclusionary policies include internalization of stigmas, higher risk of dropping out, and the de facto re-segregation of schools. Exclusion from school typically coincides with labels of being 'defiant' or 'difficult to deal with' that students have a high likelihood of internalizing. Moreover, the services provided during suspensions or at suspension centers often fail to address this internalization or the stigmas that result upon returning to school. This can be significant for a student's educational path, as research has revealed that cycles of antisocial behaviors can result from such labels and stigmas. Suspensions have shown to triple the rate of high school dropouts, in addition to also making students three times more likely to face future incarceration. On a macro level, some researchers have begun to consider the racial gap among suspension rates as a form of effectively re-segregating schools. Although the exact causes for the de facto school re-segregation are still being researched, racist attitudes and cultural friction have been suggested to be potential sources of this issue.

=== Prison pipeline ===
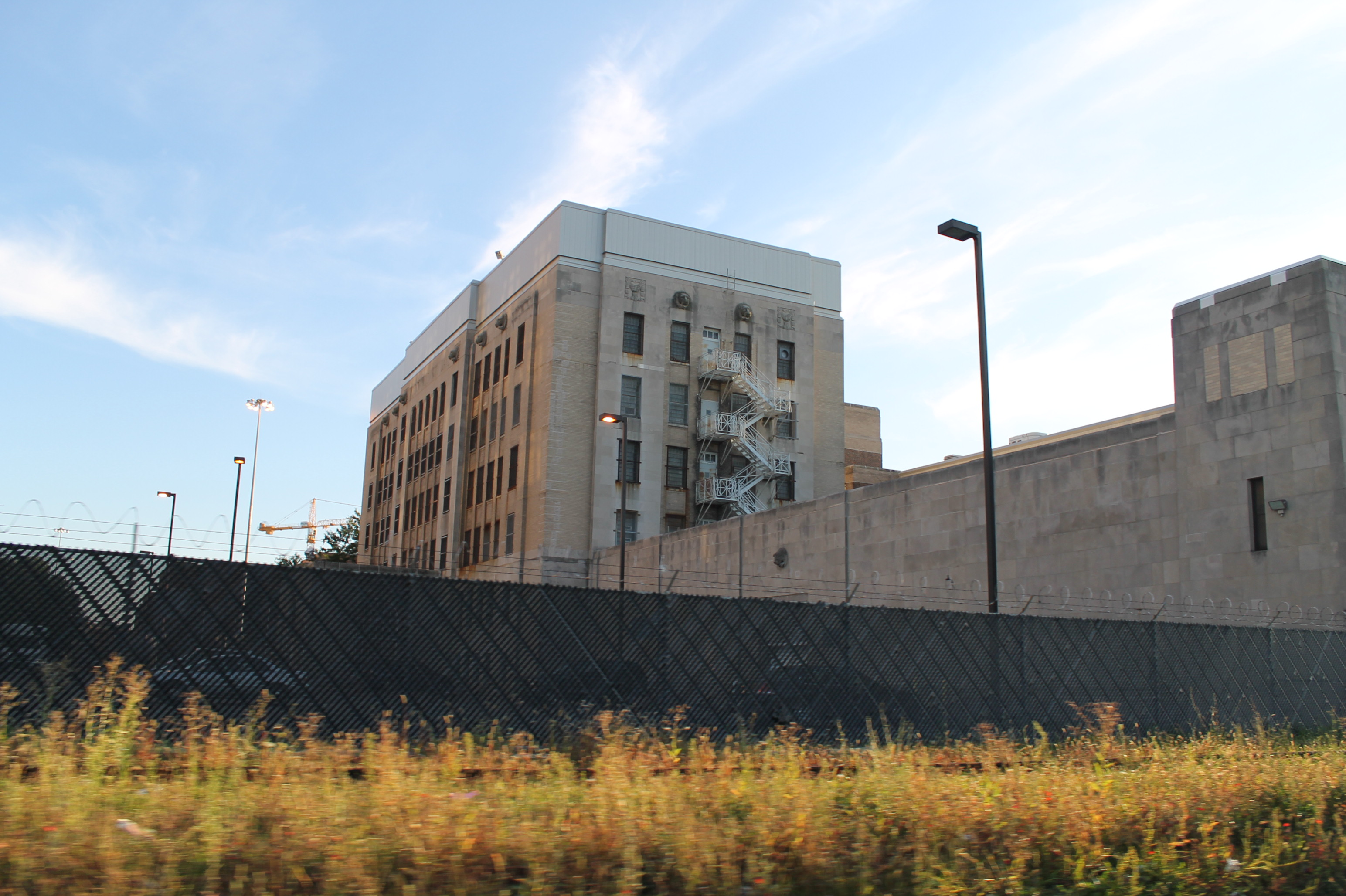
A juvenile prison in Cook County, Illinois

The prison pipeline, also known as the school-to-prison pipeline (SPP), refers to the system of student disciplinary referrals to the American juvenile justice system, rather than using disciplinary mechanisms within schools themselves. As a result of this system, negative consequences during adulthood, such as incarceration, that disproportionately impact minority students have been attributed to the pipeline, which is closely related to the issue of race in the United States criminal justice system. Many studies have revealed that exposures to the justice system during childhood make students more likely to become imprisoned later in life. School disciplinary policies that overly effect Black and minority students, such as zero-tolerance and exclusionary policies, increase the risk for students to come into contact with the juvenile justice system. These policies disproportionately target students of color, as evidence has revealed a rise among African-American males in the prison system who were expelled from schools with recently implemented zero-tolerance policies. Furthermore, suspensions have been identified as tripling the risk of youth incarceration for students. Other factors that have fostered the development of the prison pipeline include law enforcement on school campuses, such as school resource officers, that play a role in school discipline. Law enforcement officers intervene or perform arrests to address student issues—like drug use or assault of teachers or other students—that break the law. However, implicit biases against minority students have been linked to the disciplinary recommendations made by school officers, which tend to result in more severe punishments to be levied against these students.

Though many different factors have gradually led to the creation of the prison pipeline, one of the clearest indicators of its development comes from state budgets, as states have generally been increasing investments in justice system infrastructure while simultaneously divesting from education. School-specific factors have also contributed to the development of the prison pipeline, including the discipline gap and the criminalization of schools. A significant number of studies has indicated that exclusionary discipline can create cycles of bad behaviors that result in progressively more severe consequences—often ending in involvement with the justice system. This has been evidenced by disproportionate arrest rates in schools. For example, even though they constitute only 15% of students, Black students comprise 50% of arrests in schools. Subsequent punishments, especially institutional confinement, can have inadvertent consequences, like leading to students dropping out of school. Moreover, the bureaucracy of correctional institutions does not correspond well with school systems, as curricula do not always match. Consequently, students who re-enroll in school tend to lack support systems for reentry and have to overcome the deficit between curricula. Research has also indicated that, especially in inner cities, the various elements of the prison pipeline are ultimately counterproductive to improving or "fixing" a student's education and disciplinary track record.

== Resistance ==
There have been a variety of grassroots movements led by minority community members and governmental efforts alike to resist racial educational inequality since the end of the civil war. Individual schools, organizations, and activist groups throughout United States' history have pushed back against various forms of educational inequality through the creation of compensatory educational programs, creating community-led schools in times of crises, protesting school segregation and inequality, and advocating for critical race theory in the classroom.

=== Improving Learning in WWII Japanese Internment Camps ===
During World War II, President Franklin D. Roosevelt signed Executive Order 9066, which led 120,000 people of Japanese descent to be forcibly relocated to concentration camps in the western United States. Schools were set up by the government for all education levels, but they were incomplete, poorly funded, overcrowded, and understaffed. Schools did improve by the time camps closed down in 1945, however there was still chronic lack of supplies, and many students who graduated while incarcerated at the camp in the early years believed they were unprepared for college and felt that living in the camps had ruined their chances for academic success. In response to this educational crisis, captive Japanese Americans built three additional school campuses by hand, students made some of their own school materials, and a club was formed to help prepare students for college and returning to society after internment.

=== Freedom Schools ===
The Freedom schools of the 1960s were an educational program directed towards young Black southerners that rose out of the civil rights movement. The first Freedom Schools began in rural Mississippi in 1964, where educational inequality and segregation was rampant in the pre-civil rights act era. They were created by the Student Nonviolent Coordinating Committee (SNCC) as a part of a greater voter registration and educational movement called Freedom Summer. Schools generally had greatly positive reception from its students, with a curriculum focused on teaching about empowerment, social movements, and African American history.

Freedom schools were one of many efforts during the civil rights movement to achieve equality for Black Americans, reflecting a desire of civil rights activists, especially the SNCC, to create institutions that meet the needs of Black people that existing institutions were not supporting. The Freedom Schools were only intended to last for the summer as a part of the Freedom Summer campaign to register more voters and increase voter literacy among Black youth, they persisted for years after the summer of 1964.

=== Black Studies ===
Another form of resistance that has been pervasive throughout history and educational activist movements is the struggle for identity-based education, such as Black Studies. Generally, Ethnic studies provide insight on an identity's culture, history, and philosophy for students as an interdisciplinary form of education. Black studies in its form today grew out of the civil rights movement, but the first examples of what could be described as Black studies came from Quaker schools that served to educate Black people as early as the late 17th century. In the 1960s, growing ideals of self-determination, Black pride, and Black radicalism motivated many student-led movements for Black studies in college curriculums. Civil rights activist Malcom X was also a proponent of this movement, encouraging students to push for Black studies in speeches and debates on college campuses. San Francisco State College (now San Francisco State University) was the first college to establish a Black studies department in 1968, after student-led protests succeeded in convincing the administration.

=== Mexican American Studies ===
Similar to the origin of Black Studies, Mexican American and Latino studies arose out of the Chicano Movement, a social movement combatting racial oppression of the late 1960s and 1970s. The place of Mexican American studies in the classroom has received considerable backlash in recent years, tied to nation-wide bans on Critical Race Theory in public schools in the early 2020s. Most well known, perhaps, is the battle for Mexican American studies in the Arizona TUSD public school district, where an almost ten year ban on the subject took place from 2010-2017, ending in a winning lawsuit filed by students and teachers against HB 2281, a law that called for the close of the district's Mexican American Studies through its ban of ethnic studies.

=== NoDAPL Indigenous Schooling ===
During the NoDAPL protests, a 2016 movement led by Oceti Sakowin (Sioux) tribes to protest the Dakota Access Pipeline, a temporary school was set up within the blockade camp to educate the Indigenous children who were joining in the protests. This school, named by its students the Defenders of the Water School, was created to take advantage of the opportunity of the gathering of many Indigenous children and elders of different tribes in one space to pass on knowledge of culture, history, and environmental activism that is not taught in conventional schools.

== Other policies ==
=== No Child Left Behind Act (NCLB) ===
The No Child Left Behind Act (NCLB) was a reauthorization of the Elementary and Secondary Education Act of 1965 (ESEA) which aimed to improve the education of "disadvantaged" students through monetary aid, known as "Title 1 money." Signed in 2001 by President Bush, NCLB aimed to create a more inclusive, more responsive, and fairer education system by ensuring accountability, flexibility, and increased federal support for schools. NCLB emphasized the educational needs of minorities, the poor, ELLs, and "special education" students. Some of the criticisms NCLB has received include that its curriculum overemphasizes math and reading, restricts teaching and devalues creativity, and fixates on improving test scores instead of the educational system.

NCLB uses test scores from mathematics and reading to determine whether the achievement gap has shrunk. The reliance on standardized tests may not illustrate the child's holistic progress and achievement. Furthermore, these tests are used to determine whether a school meets "adequate yearly progress" (AYP). Penalties are administered to schools who fail to meet AYP, an approach known as "test and punish." Such penalties may include the loss of Title 1 funding, the school's closure, the "restructuring of the entire system," the school's conversion into a charter school, the provision of free tutoring, or permitting students "to transfer to a better-performing public school in the same district." While some of NCLB's sanctions have been shown not to work, the forced "restructuring [of] leadership" has proven beneficial to a school's improvement.

Another NCLB provision was the hiring of "highly qualified" individuals. This required teachers to have a bachelor's degree and a state-specific teaching credential. Some argue that such requirements overemphasize a mastery of "subject matter" while underemphasizing interpersonal skills, such as introspection. Despite NCLB's goal of reaching disadvantaged students, "highly qualified" teachers often end up at wealthier schools due to better pay.

=== Every Student Succeeds Act ===
On December 10, 2015, the NCLB ended and was replaced the by the Every Student Succeeds Act (ESSA), eliminating some of the controversial provisions of NCLB. Under the new law, the federal government continues to provide a broad framework for schools. However, the responsibility of holding schools accountable shifts back to the states. Each state must set flexible goals for its schools and evaluate them accordingly.

Under the new law, states must still test students once a year in certain areas such as math and reading. However, states are not limited to using their own tests, and the law encourages states to get rid of unnecessary testing.

In 2019, Collaborative for Student Success, an educational advocacy organization that focuses on defending efforts on advancing policies that support the development of strong systems and practices to ensure that all kids are prepared to achieve their potential and professional goals held an ESSA Anniversary Summit on Capitol Hill in Washington, D.C. At the summit, Becky Pringle, Vice President of the National Education Association (NEA), pointed out that despite "the many successes and new opportunities [ESSA brought] ... some states [had not] had the capacity to take advantage of the innovations built into the law."

== Potential solutions ==
=== Early intervention ===
Research studies have shown that early intervention may have drastic effects on future growth and development in children, as well as improve their well-being and reduce the demand for social services over their life. Early intervention can include a wide array of educational activities, including an increased emphasis on reading and writing, providing additional tools or resources for learning, as well as supplements to aid special education students.

==== Perry Preschool Project ====
The Perry Preschool Project in Ypsilanti, Michigan, reaffirmed the positive relationship between early education and future achievement. The study assigned random three- and four-year-old children from low-income families to attend the Perry school, which had ample resources and a high teacher-to-student ratio. It also heavily emphasized the development of reading and writing skills. After graduating, students who attended the Perry school were found to be less than 20% as likely to have committed a criminal offense compared to those who did not attend the preschool. The study also discovered that those who attended the preschool program earned, on average, $5,500 more per year than those who did not attend the school, pointing to a higher return on investment for the students who attended the Perry school. This study received widespread acclaim and validated the idea that early intervention is a powerful tool in alleviating educational and income inequality in America.

==== Abecedarian Early Intervention Project ====
The Abecedarian Project in North Carolina is another study that found early intervention in education produced significant gains for future attainment. The study provided a group of infants from low-income families with early childhood education programs five days a week for eight hours each day. The educational programs emphasized language, and incorporated education into game activities. This program continued for five years. The group's future progress was then measured as they aged and, compared to a control group that contained students of a similar socioeconomic status who did not receive early intervention. Children who received early education were more likely to attend college and graduate high school, and they reported having higher salaries. They were also less likely to engage in criminal activities, and more likely to have consistent employment. This study was also highly influential in supporting the positive effect of early intervention initiatives.

==== General effects of early intervention ====
There is more evidence that points to the beneficial effects of early intervention programs. It has been found that children who attend education centers or participate in early childhood education programs perform better on average on initial math and reading assessments than children who did not participate in these initiatives. This gap continues through the early years of children's schooling and is more prominent among groups of students who come from disadvantaged backgrounds. Most social studies conducted regarding intervention programs find that inequality in early education leads to inequality in future ability, achievement, and adult success. Neurological studies have also found that negative psychosocial risks in early childhood affect the developing brain and a child's development. These studies concluded that reducing the effects of these negative risks and subsequent inequality requires targeted interventions to address specific risk factors, like education.

=== Parental involvement and engagement ===
Parental involvement is when schools give advice to parents on what they can do to help their children while parental engagement is when schools listen to parents on how better they can teach their students. Parental involvement has been shown to work well, but engagement works even better. Researchers have found that high-achieving African-American students are more likely to have parents who tutor them at home, provide additional practice problems, and keep in touch with school personnel.

There is evidence that African-American parents do value education for their child, but may not be as involved in schools because they face hostility from teachers when they give their input. Lack of involvement can also be due to social class and socioeconomic status; working-class, African-American parents tend to have less access to "human, financial, social, and cultural resources." Working-class, African-American parents also tend to be more confrontational toward school personnel compared to the middle-class, African-American parents who usually have the ability to choose which school and which class their child is enrolled in.

Surveys conducted on parental involvement in low-income families showed that more than 97% of the parents said they wanted to help their children at home and wanted to work with the teachers. However, they were more likely to agree with the statements "I have little to do with my children's success in school," "Working parents do not have time to be involved in school activities," and "I do not have enough training to help make school decisions." A case study of Clark Elementary in the Pacific Northwest showed that teachers involved parents more after understanding the challenges that the parents faced, such as being a non-native English speakers or being unemployed.

=== School funding ===
School funding and quality have been shown to account for as much of a 40% variance in student achievement. While school funding can be seen as a factor that perpetuates educational inequality, it also has the ability to assist in mitigating it.

The funding gap is a term often used to explain the differences in resource allocation between high-income and low-income schools. Many studies have found that states are spending less money on students from low-income communities than they are on students from high-income communities (Growing Gaps figure). A 2015 study found that, across the United States, school districts with high levels of poverty are likely to receive 10% less funding per student (in resources provided from the state and local government) compared to more affluent school districts. For students of color, this funding gap is more pervasive. School districts where students of color are the majority have been shown to receive 15% less per student compared to school districts that are mostly white.

The funding gap has many implications for students whose school districts are receiving less aid from the state and local government (in comparison to less impoverished districts). For students in districts receiving less aid, this funding gap has led to poorer teacher quality, which has been shown to lead to low levels of educational attainment among poor and minority students. The Learning Policy Institute concluded from a longitudinal study in 2018 demonstrating that "a 21.7% increase in per-pupil spending throughout all 12 school-age years was enough to eliminate the education attainment gap between children from low-income and non-poor families and to raise graduation rates for low-income children by 20 percentage points".

Another factor is district funding distribution and the models used. Each model prioritizes a specific aspect in education and varies in how much each school receives in funds. Even when state methods distribute funds equitably, the district models may affect the path of dollars, which can blunt or amplify equity, and even increase the educational gap.

=== Charter schools ===
A charter school is an independent learning institution most commonly serving secondary students. It receives public funding through a charter granted to a state or local agency.

Charter schools have been depicted as a controversial solution to alleviate educational inequality in the United States. In an effort to combat the impacts of living in a low-income school district, charter schools have emerged as a means of reorganizing funding to better assist low-income students and their communities. This method is designed to decrease the negative effects on students' educational quality as a result of living in a low-tax-base community.

Critics of charter schools argue they de-emphasize the significance of public education and are subject to greedy enterprise exploiting the fundamental right of education for the sole purpose of profiting. While charter schools are technically considered "public schools," opponents argue that their operational differences implicitly create differences in quality and type of public education, as standards and operating procedures are individualized based on each school. Another criticism of charter schools is the possible negative effects they may have on students who are racial minorities or who come from low-income backgrounds. Studies have found charter schools to be much more segregated than their public school counterparts. Free-market proponents often support charter schools, arguing they are more effective than typical public schools, specifically in reference to low-income students. Other charter school supporters argue that these schools revive participation in public education, expand existing boundaries regarding teaching methods, and encourage a more community-based approach towards education. However, studies have not found conclusive evidence that charter schools as a whole are more effective than traditional public schools.

One common model of charter schools is called a "no excuses" school. This label has been adopted by many charter schools as a means of indicating their dedication to a rigorous and immersive educational experience. While there is no official list of features required to be a "no-excuse" charter, they have many common characteristics. Some of these attributes include high behavioral expectations, strict disciplinary codes, college preparatory curriculum, and initiatives to hire and retain quality teachers.

=== School discipline reform ===
Educational and disciplinary inequalities are complex and multi-faceted, but there have been many proposals to reduce disparities. Some researchers suggest that improving relationships between students and teachers, as well as the overall school culture, can better support minority students and provide a foundation for other reforms. Research has shown that, when teachers are engaging with and involved in a student's success, African-American students are more likely to accept them. Engaging teaching styles can better connect with Black students, who often face more barriers to success, and improve classroom management, reducing behavioral conflicts and the need for disciplinary intervention. Suggestions for improving teaching styles include accounting for challenges students may face outside of school, contextualizing student actions, implicit bias training, and acknowledging cultural differences between teachers and students. Even though research about how to reduce the discipline gap is still ongoing, acknowledging the risk of bias when disciplining students has been noted as a potential method of limiting the growth of the gap.

Other approaches related to reducing the discipline gap focus on disciplinary practices themselves. It has been suggested that school discipline should center around empathetic accountability systems rather than punitive consequences. Research has shown that negative perceptions of a school's disciplinary climate can lead to apathy towards rules and school in general. One method of implementing this shift is through Positive Behavior Interventions and Supports (PBIS), which focuses on building relationships and proactively discussing rules and codes of conduct with students. However, critics note that it can be expensive to implement. Advocates for school discipline reform have also expressed interest in applying restorative justice practices to school disciplinary procedures. Restorative justice in schools uses conflict mediation to address disciplinary infractions and build stronger relationships between parties involved; however, the efficacy of restorative programs is still being determined. Additional approaches focus on mitigating the negative consequences of zero-tolerance policies by expanding disciplinary options and moving away from exclusionary policies such as suspensions or expulsions. Community involvement has also been suggested to address discrepancies in disciplinary policies by bringing families and school officials together to improve advocacy for minority students. This approach has had some success, such as in California communities where community advocacy involving youth, school officials, and family members successfully addressed disciplinary issues related to suspensions.

Given that the discipline gap disproportionately moves Black and minority students into the prison pipeline, school discipline reform has also focused on reducing the factors that contribute to the pipeline. Advocates note that shifting away from bias and policies that contribute to the pipeline, such as punitive discipline, also entails broader considerations of how the pipeline manifests and what it costs society. Suspensions and other precursors to the pipeline not only potentially lead to future incarceration, but also to societal expenses that range from costs associated with crime to forfeited sources of tax revenue. Other reforms related to breaking the pipeline include addressing transitional issues between correctional facilities and schools, as transitions often fail to effectively transfer students without a loss of school time. Ensuring better transitions has been identified as a potential area that legislation and policymakers can address. Additionally, reform efforts include raising awareness of how juvenile justice system referrals or other disciplinary punishments can lead to severe consequences later in life for students, especially because school staff and resource officers have a degree of discretion when issuing punishments.

== See also ==
- Inequality in the United States
- Educational inequality
- Public school funding
- School segregation
