= John Ehrenreich =

American author, academic, and clinical psychologist

John Ehrenreich (born February 20, 1943) is an American clinical psychologist and social critic, who has published books on health policy, humanitarian policy, US history and US social policy. He is known for his development (with his then-wife, Barbara Ehrenreich) of the idea of the "medical–industrial complex" and the concept of the "professional–managerial class".

His book, Third Wave Capitalism: How Money, Power, and the Pursuit of Self-Interest Have Imperiled the American Dream (Cornell University Press) was described by Washington Post columnist E.J. Dionne as "a brilliant take on what ails our society and our politics," and by Arlie Hochschild, author of Strangers in Their Own Land, as "a fascinating 'long look' at America.... Sobering, startling, important―a big-think book."

His latest book is The Making of a Pandemic: Social, Political, and Psychological Perspectives on Covid-19 (Springer).

== Life and work ==
Born in Philadelphia, Ehrenreich received his bachelor's degree in 1964 from Harvard College, followed by a Ph.D. in cellular biology from Rockefeller University and a second Ph.D. in clinical psychology from the New School for Social Research. He was a professor at the State University of New York at Old Westbury, first in American Studies, later in Psychology. He retired from Old Westbury in 2018.

In 1967, Ehrenreich married fellow Rockefeller University graduate student Barbara Alexander, now better known as social critic Barbara Ehrenreich (author of the 2001 best-seller Nickel and Dimed). Together, John and Barbara Ehrenreich played a leading role in the anti-Vietnam War movement in New York City. They co-authored several books and articles, including Long March, Short Spring: The Student Uprising at Home and Abroad (1969), The American Health Empire: Power, Profits and Politics (1970), and two articles on The Professional-Managerial Class (1977).

Although the pair divorced in the late-1970s, John and Barbara Ehrenreich continued to author occasional articles together, including an updating of their previous work on the professional managerial class, Death of a Yuppie Dream: The Rise and Fall of the Professional Managerial Class (2013), and The Making of the American 99% and the Collapse of the Middle Class (2011).

John Ehrenreich has also published several other books, including The Humanitarian Companion: A Guide for International Aid, Development, and Human Rights Workers (2005); and Managing Stress in Humanitarian Workers (Ed., 2012), The Altruistic Imagination: A History of Social Work and Social Policy in the United States (1985), The Cultural Crisis of Modern Medicine (Ed., 1978); and The Making of a Pandemic: Social, Political, and Economic Perspectives on Covid-19 (2022)

In addition to his books and journalistic writing, Ehrenreich has published numerous articles on social policy and psychology in scholarly and professional journals, including Understanding PTSD: Forgetting Trauma (2003), Managing Stress in Humanitarian Aid Workers (2004); Women in prison: Approaches to understanding the lives of a forgotten population (with S. McQuaide, 1998) and Personality Theory: A Case of Intellectual and Social Isolation? (1997).

Ehrenreich has served as a consultant to NGOs in Bosnia, Turkey, Jordan, Sierra Leone, as well as in Europe and the United States. He is an International Associate of the Netherlands-based Antares Foundation.

== Family ==
Ehrenreich has two children from his marriage to Barbara (Alexander) Ehrenreich: journalist, law professor, and national security expert Rosa Brooks and journalist and novelist Ben Ehrenreich. In 1987, he married social worker Sharon McQuaide, with whom he has one child, Alexander Ehrenreich.
