= How Everything Became War and the Military Became Everything: Tales from the Pentagon =

2016 book by Rosa Brooks

- Author: Rosa Brooks
- Publisher: Simon & Schuster
- English publication date: 2016
- ISBN: 9781476777863
- OCLC: 940795371

How Everything Became War and the Military Became Everything: Tales from the Pentagon is a 2016 book by Rosa Brooks.

The New York Times' review stated "At its finest, 'How Everything Became War and the Military Became Everything' is a dynamic work of reportage, punctuated by savory details like this one. But Ms. Brooks has a larger ambition: She wants to explore exactly what happens to a society when the customary distinctions between war and peace melt away." Writing in Foreign Affairs, Lawrence Freedman said the book details how the U.S. military became part of a blurred boundary between war and peace, and drawn "into pursuits for which it is not well suited, such as postconflict reconstruction". A National Review book review said that it confirmed real-world "consequences" of trends noted in a 1992 Air Force officer thesis, printed in the United States Army War College quarterly journal, Parameters that was set in a fictionalized 2012, in which "after years of being handed the tough jobs the rest of the government seemed incapable of handling, the U.S. military, with the acquiescence of the American people and their government, simply took over" in a military coup d'état of the United States government.
