= Ben Ehrenreich =

American journalist

- Born: 1972 (age 53–54)
- Occupations: Journalist; novelist
- Parent(s): John Ehrenreich; Barbara Ehrenreich
- Website: benehrenreich.net

Ben Ehrenreich (born 1972) is an American freelance journalist and novelist who lives in Los Angeles.

== Life and career ==
Ehrenreich was raised in Syosset, New York and graduated from Syosset High School. He began working as a journalist in the alternative press in the late 1990s, publishing extensively in LA Weekly and The Village Voice. His journalism, essays, and criticism have since appeared in Harper's, The New York Times Magazine, The Nation, the Los Angeles Times, The Believer, and the London Review of Books. He has reported from Afghanistan, Haiti, Cambodia, El Salvador, Mexico, and all over the United States. In 2011, he received a National Magazine Award in feature writing for an article published in Los Angeles magazine.

His first novel, The Suitors, was published by Counterpoint Press in 2006. Reviewing it, the American Library Association named him "a writer to watch" while Publishers Weekly called him "an original talent". In BOMB magazine, the novelist Frederic Tuten called The Suitors "truly a ravishing book". Ehrenreich's short fiction has appeared in McSweeney's, BOMB, Black Clock, and many other publications.

Ehrenreich teaches in the graduate writing program at Otis College of Art and Design.

Ehrenreich's book The Way to the Spring: Life and Death in Palestine was published in 2016. It describes life in the Palestinian village of Nabi Salih and the villagers' struggle against the encroaching Israeli settlement of Halamish. The Economist wrote that the book "should be read by friends and foes of Israel alike." In a review for The New York Times, Ben Rawlence called it a "weighty contribution to the Palestinian side of the scales of history".

In 2020, Ehrenreich released Desert Notebooks: A Road Map for the End of Time. In the Los Angeles Times, Jim Ruland called the book "a hybrid memoir, travelogue and metaphysical enquiry". In The New York Times, William Atkins wrote that Ehrenreich has "built a potent memorial to our own ongoing end-times".

=== Personal life ===
Ehrenreich is the son of best-selling author Barbara Ehrenreich (Nickel and Dimed) and psychologist John Ehrenreich. His sister is law professor Rosa Brooks.

== Written works ==
- Ehrenreich, Ben (2006). The Suitors. Counterpoint Press. ISBN 1582433356.
- Ehrenreich, Ben (2011). Ether. City Lights Books. ISBN 978-0872865242.
- Ehrenreich, Ben (2016). The Way to the Spring: Life and Death in Palestine. Penguin. ISBN 978-0698148192.
- Ehrenreich, Ben (2020). Desert Notebooks: A Road Map for the End of Time. Counterpoint Press. ISBN 978-1640093539.
