= Transition Integrity Project =

Political scenario exercises in United States

- Formation: 2019
- Type: Series of June 2020 political scenario exercises
- Purpose: To identify risks to a free, fair and peaceful 2020 election
- Location: United States
- Methods: Simulation exercises
- Key people: Rosa Brooks; Nils Gilman; Jennifer Granholm; Michael Steele; John Podesta; William Kristol; David Frum; Trey Grayson

Transition Integrity Project (TIP) was a series of political scenario exercises in the United States at the beginning of June 2020, involving over 100 current and former senior government and campaign leaders, academics, journalists, polling experts and former federal and state government officials. The exercises examined potential disruptions to the 2020 presidential election and transition. TIP is not an organization, but rather a short-term project run under the auspices of the organization Protect Democracy.

== Background ==
The Transition Integrity Project was initially organized in late 2019 by Rosa Brooks, a law professor at Georgetown and former Pentagon senior official, and Nils Gilman, a former vice chancellor of the University of California, Berkeley and historian at the Berggruen Institute. Other participants in the Transition Integrity Project's exercises included:

- Michael Steele — former chair of the Republican National Committee
- John Podesta — former White House Chief of Staff to former President of the United States, Bill Clinton
- Jennifer Granholm — former Governor of Michigan
- Trey Grayson — former Secretary of State of Kentucky
- Donna Brazile — former Democratic National Committee Acting Chair
- William Kristol — journalist
- Edward Luce — journalist
- Max Boot — journalist
- David Frum — journalist

The Transition Integrity Project (TIP) was launched "out of concern that the Trump Administration may seek to manipulate, ignore, undermine or disrupt the 2020 presidential election and transition process."

=== History and context ===
Peaceful presidential transitions are seen as a hallmark of republican democracy in the United States. Even when there have been rancorous differences between the political parties and their presidential nominees, the defeated party nominee has always conceded the presidency to the electoral winner.

TIP was motivated to do a short term project by their assessment that the November elections would "be marked by a chaotic legal and political landscape. We also assess that President Trump is likely to contest the result by both legal and extra-legal means, in an attempt to hold onto power."

Trump's own statements have fueled concerns about the peaceful transition of power. In an interview with Chris Wallace in July, 2020, Donald Trump refused to say whether or not he would accept the results of the 2020 election.

A day later, Trump tweeted about postponing the 2020 election, spurring concerns that he might attempt to delay the election due to unspecified and unsubstantiated voter fraud. "With Universal Mail-In Voting (not Absentee Voting, which is good), 2020 will be the most INACCURATE & FRAUDULENT Election in history. It will be a great embarrassment to the USA. Delay the Election until people can properly, securely and safely vote???"

In the history of the United States, the presidential election has never been postponed, and the president does not have the legal power to delay an election, whose date is set by an 1845 law. Representative Jerry Nadler, chairman of the House Judiciary Committee, noted that only the Congress has the authority to change laws that deal with the date of the election.

Trump also claimed that mail balloting leads to widespread fraud, making a distinction between universal mail-in Voting and absentee voting. "Absentee Ballots are a great way to vote for the many senior citizens, military, and others who can't get to the polls on Election Day. These ballots are very different from 100% Mail-In Voting, which is 'RIPE for FRAUD,' and shouldn't be allowed!" Fact checkers say there is no evidence of substantial fraud associated with mail voting. Many studies show that postal voting has an extremely small risk of fraud. Known instances of such fraud are very rare, with one database finding 491 cases of absentee ballot fraud from 2000 to 2012, a period in which billions of votes were cast. A Washington Post analysis found that officials identified just 372 possible cases of double voting or voting on behalf of deceased people out of about 14.6 million votes cast by mail in the 2016 and 2018 general elections, or 0.0025 percent. All mailed-in ballots in all states are verified before they are counted, regardless of whether they are cast in an all-mail state, said Wendy Underhill, direction of elections and redistricting at the NCSL.

Trump has also claimed that Democrats' efforts to expand the availability of mail-in voting and ballot collection will result in widespread voter fraud. Democrats see this as Trump laying the groundwork for a contested election. This outcome could be especially likely in the event of a so-called "Red Mirage", where Trump appears to have won on election night but actually loses after all of the mail-in ballots have been tallied. Democrats also became concerned that Trump might interfere with the ability of the United States Postal Service to deliver ballots.

In September 2020, a federal judge issued an injunction against the recent USPS actions, ruling that Trump and Postmaster Louis DeJoy were "involved in a politically motivated attack on the efficiency of the Postal Service," adding that the 14 states requesting the injunction "demonstrated that this attack on the Postal Service is likely to irreparably harm the states' ability to administer the 2020 general election."

On September 25, 2020, Donald Trump repeated his concerns that "ballots were a disaster" and he refused to commit to a peaceful transfer of power, insisting on a "continuation of power" instead.

== War games ==
=== Methodology ===
In the summer of 2020, TIP conducted a series of war-gaming exercises. The scenarios examined by TIP included:

1. Game One: Ambiguous. The first game investigated a scenario in which the outcome of the election remained unclear from election night and throughout gameplay. The results from three states are in contention and ballots are destroyed in one of the states, making it unclear who should have won that state. Neither campaign is willing to concede.
2. Game Two: Clear Biden Win. Biden wins both the Electoral College and the popular vote. Trump alleges fraud and takes steps to benefit himself and his family but ultimately hands the White House over to Biden.
3. Game Three: Clear Trump Win. The third scenario started with an Electoral College victory for President Trump (286 to 252), but a popular vote win (52% to 47%) for former Vice President Biden. In this scenario Biden refused to concede, convinced the Democratic governors of two states that Trump won to send separate slates of electors to the Electoral College, encouraged three states to threaten secession, and convinced the House of Representatives to refuse to certify the election and declare Biden the victor.
4. Game Four: Narrow Biden Win. The final scenario explored a narrow Biden win where he leads with less than 1% of the popular vote and has a slim lead at 278 electoral votes. The Trump campaign sows chaos but Senate Republicans and the Joint Chiefs of Staff eventually signal that they accept Biden's win. Trump refuses to leave and is removed by the Secret Service.

=== Conclusions ===
In August 2020, TIP released a report outlining its findings and recommendations. The report stated, "We […] assess that the [sic] President Trump is likely to contest the result by both legal and extra-legal means, in an attempt to hold onto power. Recent events, including the President's own unwillingness to commit to abiding by the results of the election, the Attorney General's embrace of the President's groundless electoral fraud claims, and the unprecedented deployment of federal agents to put down leftwing protests, underscore the extreme lengths to which President Trump may be willing to go in order to stay in office." The report's intention was to inspire the necessary changes to ensure a fair election in 2020. "These risks can be mitigated; the worst outcomes of the exercises are far from a certainty. The purpose of this report is not to frighten, but to spur all stakeholders to action."

== Analysis ==
The TIP report sparked a national conversation about risks to the 2020 election and transition and means of mitigating those risks. The TIP team admitted that they didn't game out two areas of interest: post-election legal actions and media, including social media, actions after the election. These shortcomings were simulated in another post-election simulation run in October.

== Similar efforts by conservative groups ==
Two American conservative think tanks, the Texas Public Policy Foundation and the Claremont Institute, assembled a team of constitutional scholars and experts in other relevant fields (election law, foreign affairs, law enforcement, and media) and performed a similar set of exercises. They gamed out three scenarios:

1. Game One: Clear Trump Win. Trump eventually wins 32 states and 322 Electoral College votes, but the announcement is delayed for days or weeks to allow time for counting mail-in ballots.
2. Game Two: Clear Biden Win. Biden eventually wins 26 states and Washington, D.C., which gives him 342 Electoral College votes, but the announcement is delayed for days or weeks to allow time for counting mail-in ballots.
3. Game Three: Ambiguous. The final election results of several states are the subject of intense court fights that disrupt voting by the Electoral College and certification of the election by Congress. Eventually these fights end up being argued before the Supreme Court.

They concluded that even in the face of public unrest and attempted interference by Russia and China, the constitutional order would prevail.

== Aftermath ==
Donald Trump lost the popular vote by a wide margin (over 7 million votes nationally) and the electoral college by the same margin as Trump won the White House in 2016: 306/232 in Biden's favor.

Having lost the popular vote and failing to secure the 270 electoral college votes required to win the Presidency, Trump claimed widespread fraud. He ordered his legal team to file dozens of court cases throughout the country. To date, they won one case and 59 were dropped by his own attorneys, dismissed by courts before evidence was presented, or had rulings against Trump's efforts.

The day after Trump's lawyers abandoned their court case in Michigan courts, Trump summoned Michigan state Senate Majority Leader Mike Shirkey and House Speaker Lee Chatfield to the White House to discuss having the legislature ignore the loss at the ballot box and certify electors favorable to him. Biden won Michigan by 150,000 votes. Such a move would be unprecedented and may be illegal according to Michigan law.

Trump also unsuccessfully personally pressured the Governor of Georgia, Republican Brian Kemp, to overturn the election.

Since the election, Trump raised money allegedly for legal costs related to overturning the election. Trump sources claim hundreds of millions in donations to date. However, the fund raising materials spell out that the vast majority of donations are not going toward funding litigation to overturn the election, but rather, to his new Leadership PAC, "Save America," which allows the money to be spent on virtually anything including direct payments to Trump himself.

Thus, much of scenario two of the war games has played out.

In addition, on January 6, 2021, the day Congress met to certify the votes of the Electoral College, Donald Trump held a rally in front of the White House calling for a march on the Capital which resulted in a riot. This was the first such attack on the U.S. Capitol since Puerto Rican Nationalists attacked Congress in 1954. Violence was also one of the possible outcomes that the TIP report suggested.

In response, Nancy Pelosi, The Speaker of the House, and many Democrats called for one article of Impeachment against Donald J. Trump for, "Incitement of Insurrection". Donald Trump was impeached by the House of Representatives for a second time on January 13, 2021.

Shortly before Twitter disabled Trump's account on January 8, 2021, he finally conceded the election in a tweet, saying, "To all of those who have asked, I will not be going to the Inauguration on January 20th," and "new administration will be inaugurated on January 20"
