= Rosa Brooks =

American legal academic

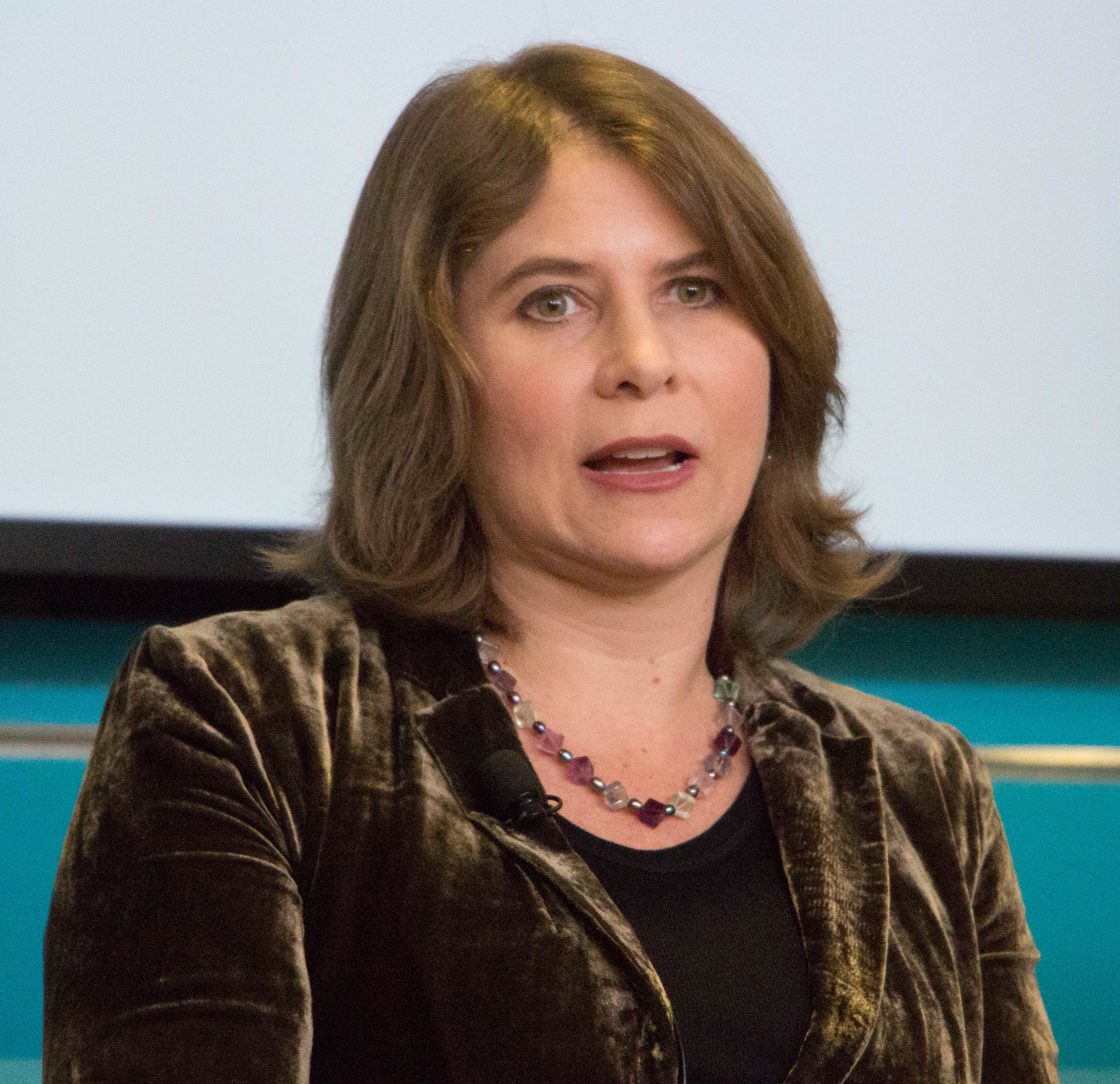
- Brooks in 2017
- Born: Rosa Ehrenreich; 1970 (age 55–56); New York City, New York, U.S.
- Education: Harvard University (BA); Christ Church, Oxford (MSt); Yale University (JD)
- Political party: Democratic
- Spouses: Peter Brooks (divorced); Joseph Mouer
- Parents: John Ehrenreich (father); Barbara Ehrenreich (mother)
- Relatives: Ben Ehrenreich (brother); Sharon McQuaide (stepmother); Gary Stevenson (stepfather)
- Police career
- Country: United States
- Allegiance: District of Columbia
- Department: Metropolitan Police Department of the District of Columbia
- Service years: 2016–2020
- Rank: Reserve Police Officer
- Website: rosa-brooks.com

Rosa Brooks (née Ehrenreich; born 1970) is an American law professor, journalist, author and commentator on foreign policy, U.S. politics and criminal justice. She is the Scott K. Ginsburg Professor of Law and Policy at Georgetown University Law Center. Brooks is also an adjunct scholar at West Point's Modern War Institute and a senior fellow at the New America Foundation. From April 2009 to July 2011, Brooks was a counselor to Under Secretary of Defense for Policy Michèle Flournoy.

Brooks is a commentator on politics and foreign policy. She served as a columnist and contributing editor for Foreign Policy and as a weekly columnist for the Los Angeles Times. Brooks authored the 2016 book How Everything Became War and the Military Became Everything and the 2021 book Tangled Up in Blue: Policing the American City, which is based on her five years as a reserve police officer in Washington, D.C.

At Georgetown Law, Brooks founded the Center for Innovations in Community Safety, formerly the Innovative Policing Program, which in 2017 launched the Police for Tomorrow Fellowship Program with Washington, D.C.'s Metropolitan Police Department. She founded the Leadership Council for Women in National Security, the Transition Integrity Project and the Democracy Futures Project. In 2021, 2022 and 2023, Washingtonian magazine listed Brooks as one of Washington's "most influential people."

== Early life and education ==
Rosa Brooks is the daughter of author Barbara Ehrenreich (née Alexander) and psychologist John Ehrenreich. Her parents separated when she was young and she also grew up with her stepparents, Gary Stevenson and Sharon McQuaide. Her mother was of Scottish, Irish and English descent, while her father's ancestors were Jewish immigrants from Central Europe, but both her parents were from non-religious families. She was named after Rosa Parks and Rosa Luxemburg. Her brother is journalist and author Ben Ehrenreich. Brooks was born in a public clinic in New York City but when she was a child her parents moved to Oyster Bay, New York. She attended elementary school in Syosset and briefly attended Syosset High School in Syosset, New York, but left early after two years to attend Harvard. In 1991, she earned a Bachelor of Arts (history and literature) from Harvard University.

While an undergraduate, Brooks lived in Lowell House and served as president of the Phillips Brooks House Association, Harvard's undergraduate public service organization. She graduated Phi Beta Kappa and was a Marshall Scholar at Christ Church, Oxford. In 1993, Brooks received a Master of Studies from Oxford University in Social anthropology. In 1996, she received a J.D. from Yale Law School.

== Career ==
Brooks was a lecturer at Yale Law School, where she was the director of Yale Law School's human rights program. She was a fellow at the Carr Center for Human Rights Policy at Harvard's Kennedy School of Government, a board member of Amnesty International USA and a member of the Executive Council of the American Society of International Law. Brooks served on the board of the Open Society Foundation's US Programs Fund and as a senior advisor at the US Department of State's Bureau of Democracy, Human Rights and Labor. Brooks was also a consultant for the Open Society Institute and for Human Rights Watch.

Brooks was a member of the Policy Committee of the National Security Network. From 2001 to 2006, she was an associate professor at the University of Virginia School of Law. Brooks has been a columnist for the Los Angeles Times (June 2005 to April 9, 2009) and, since 2007, a professor at the Georgetown University Law Center. In 2019 she was named the Inaugural Scott K. Ginsberg Professor of Law and Policy.

From April 2009 to July 2011, she was on public service leave from Georgetown to serve as counselor to Under Secretary of Defense for Policy, Michele Flournoy. She received the Secretary of Defense Medal for Outstanding Public Service for her work at the Defense Department.

Brooks currently serves on the board of the Harper's Magazine Foundation, the Advisory Committee of National Security Action, the Steering Committee of the Leadership Council for Women in National Security and the board of the American Bar Association's Rule of Law Initiative.

From 2016 to 2020, she was also a reserve police officer with the Metropolitan Police Department of the District of Columbia, and she received the Chief of Police Special Award in 2019. She has also been active in Democratic presidential campaigns. She served most recently as a volunteer advisor on defense policy to the Biden campaign, and she is frequently consulted as an expert advisor on issues of national security, criminal justice, democracy and rule of law. In July 2024, after Biden's weak debate performance, she promoted a "blitz primary" to identify an alternative candidate to Joe Biden.

=== Writings ===
Brooks' scholarly work has focused mostly on national security, terrorism and rule of law issues, international law, human rights, law of war, failed states, and, more recently, criminal justice and policing. Along with Jane Stromseth and David Wippman, Brooks coauthored Can Might Make Rights? Building the Rule of Law After Military Interventions (2006). Brooks is also the author of numerous scholarly articles published in law reviews.

Brooks authored the 2016 book How Everything Became War and the Military Became Everything. It was a New York Times Notable Book of the Year and was selected by Military Times as one of the ten best books of the year. The book was also shortlisted for the Lionel Gelber Prize and the Arthur Ross Book Award.

In 2021, she published Tangled Up in Blue: Policing the American City, which is about her experience as a reserve police officer in Washington, D.C. Tangled Up in Blue was selected by the Washington Post as one of the best non-fiction books of 2021.

== Political commentary ==
In addition to serving as a weekly opinion columnist for the Los Angeles Times and Foreign Policy, Brooks was a founder of Foreign Policy's weekly podcast, The E.R., and is now a member of the Deep State Radio podcast team. She has been a frequent guest and panelist on MSNBC, Fox, CNN and NPR. Brooks has contributed numerous op-eds and book reviews to the Washington Post, The New York Times, The Atlantic, The Wall Street Journal and numerous other publications.

== Personal life ==
Brooks has two children. Brooks was previously married to the Yale literary critic Peter Brooks, and subsequently married LTC Joseph Mouer, a now-retired Army Special Forces officer.

== Works ==
- Tangled Up in Blue: Policing the Nation's Capital, Penguin, 2021, ISBN 9780525557852
- How Everything Became War and the Military Became Everything, Simon and Schuster, 2016, ISBN 9781476777863
- Rosa Brooks, Jane Stromseth, David Wippman, Can Might Make Rights? Building the Rule of Law After Military Interventions, Cambridge University Press, 2006, ISBN 0521678013
- A Garden of Paper Flowers: An American at Oxford, Picador, 1994, ISBN 9780330327947 (under the name Rosa Ehrenreich; later articles are credited to Rosa Ehrenreich Brooks)
