= Inequality in the United States =

Inequality in the United States may refer to:

- Educational inequality in the United States
- Gender inequality in the United States
- Health inequality in the United States
- Racial inequality in the United States

== Economic ==
- Income inequality in the United States
  - Causes of income inequality in the United States
- Tax policy and economic inequality in the United States
- Wealth inequality in the United States

== See also ==
- Gerontocracy
- Socioeconomic mobility in the United States
