= Public school funding in the United States =

Public education in the United States of America provides basic education from kindergarten until the twelfth grade. This is provided free of charge for the students and parents, but is paid for by taxes on property owners as well as general taxes collected by the federal government. This education is mandated by the states. With the completion of this basic schooling, one obtains a high school diploma or General Education Development (GED) as certification of basic skills.

In the United States, the largest source of funding for elementary and secondary education comes from state government aid, followed by local contributions (primarily property taxes).

According to a review of the economics literature by Kirabo Jackson, there is strong evidence of "a causal relationship between increased school spending and student outcomes. All but one of the several multi-state studies find a strong link between spending and outcomes – indicating that money matters on average... the robustness of the patterns across a variety of settings is compelling evidence of a real positive causal relationship between increased school spending and student outcomes on average." Some school investments yield notable improvements in student achievement outcome, such as investments into HVAC systems, safety and health improvements, STEM equipment, infrastructure, and classroom space.

== Categories of spending ==
The National Center for Education Statistics reports that approximately 80% of school funding in years 2000-01, 2010–11, 2016-17 was dedicated to salaries and employee benefits. Salaries decreased by 7% and benefits spending Increased by 6% from 2000-01 to 2016-17.

Current expenditures per pupil enrolled in the fall in public elementary and secondary schools were 20 percent higher in 2016–17 than in 2000–01 ($12,794 vs. $10,675, both in constant 2018–19 dollars). Current expenditures per pupil increased from $10,675 in 2000–01 to $12,435 in 2008–09, decreased between 2008–09 and 2012–13 to $11,791, and then increased to $12,794 in 2016–17.

Capital outlay expenditures per pupil in 2016–17 ($1,266) were 10 percent lower than in 2000–01 ($1,412). Interest payments on public elementary and secondary school debt per pupil were 22 percent higher in 2016–17 than in 2000–01. During this period, interest payments per pupil increased from $312 in 2000–01 to $415 in 2010–11, before declining to $379 in 2016–17 (all in constant 2018–19 dollars).

== State and local roles in education funding ==
The Federal Government contributes about 8% to funding US public schools. To fund the remaining balance per student in the public education system, state and local governments are mandated to allocate money towards education. The state allocates a percentage of its revenue, from sales and income tax, to use towards education. The funds that are set aside for education are determined by the State constitutions, Propositions, and incoming Government officials. The National Conference of State Legislatures reports that states provide structure, equality, fiscal accountability, stability and support to the public education systems. Legislation per state varies towards the level of support schools receive. Since 2008, states have reduced their school funding from taxes by 12%, the most pronounced drop on record.

Local governments allocate education funding from the revenue generated by property taxes and other fundraising efforts. Local officials have the ability to influence the rate of change of property taxes, used to fund local expenditures, including education.

Varied levels of income throughout states and within local communities results in education funding inequalities. Some communities receive excessive funding while others are lacking important resources to support students. "Much of the current litigation and legislative activity in education funding seeks to assure "adequacy", that is, a sufficient level of funding to deliver an adequate education to every student in the state." Key factors in which states receive more funding include teacher salaries, employee benefits, cost of living, class sizes, and demographics. Utah has the lowest state funding due to their demographics. They cannot afford to let average costs rise with a majority demographic of youth in which one in five residents attend public school. New York, on the other hand, has the highest-ranking expenditures, twenty thousand per student including teacher salaries, and the cost of living; significantly higher than other states.

The role of states in education funding may change following the removal of ESSER funds. They may obtain a greater role in maintaining programs or salaries of their school districts without federal intervention available. This allocation of funds towards education is a state-by-state decision left to politicians. Local funding can also supplement lost funds but is unreliable for many, especially high-poverty areas without the means to break the fall off the funding cliff.

== COVID-19 relief funding ==
In the wake of COVID-19, Congress created the Elementary and Secondary School Emergency Relief (ESSER) Fund in March 2020. The ESSER I fund responded to impacts on education for schools under the Coronavirus Aid, Relief, and Economic Security (CARES) Act. In December of 2020, ESSER II was created under the Consolidated Appropriations Act, and in March 2021, the ARP ESSER fund was enacted under the American Rescue Plan Act. $190 Billion were issued nationwide, designated to be used for a variety of purposes in response to pandemic struggles: prevention, preparation and response to COVID-19.

Through 2021-22, ESSER funds were largely (47.7%) spent towards student's academic, social, and emotional needs, including summer and afterschool learning programs, tutoring, and the purchasing of instructional materials. Another large proportion (33.6%) was spent towards continuing school operations. Lesser amounts (15.8% & 3%) were allocated towards physical health and safety as well as mental health support for students and staff respectively.

These funds had a deadline for usage; the latest, the ARP ESSER fund, with an obligation deadline of September 30, 2024. Districts also received a 120-day liquidation period following the deadline to fully spend funds- ending January 28, 2025, for ARP ESSER. States could request deadline extensions to the liquidation period and were approved, leaving a cushion for a smooth transition. Full effects of the fiscal drop are still speculation. They may cause large disruptions to learning environments that are unprepared and not academically recovered enough to go without the support programs and interventions ESSER funds provided. Without continued funding, issues of low-test scores and low attendance are predicted to worsen. This funding removal also impacts districts disproportionately; those districts with the highest poverty percentage were awarded more funds as they faced greater challenges. The removal of such funds will lead to the largest funding cliff and mass disruptions in the educational environment without money to fill the gaps in the underfunded institutions.

== Resource inequality ==
Income and tax revenue varies widely from district to district. The current school funding model has led to a huge disparity in the funding that schools may receive nationwide or in the same state. Primarily, schools in affluent areas receive more funding as compared to those located in low-income areas, who have comparatively lower property and income taxes, affecting the funding of the schools. Poor school performance in low-income areas has a direct causal relationship with the low income and property taxes. "Using state taxes to fund public education has the potential to create funding insecurities. [...] state tax revenues are largely generated from income and sales taxes. Income and sales tax revenue are not stable sources and have the propensity to drop, in times of recession" (p.122). A funding system of recapture and redistribution from property wealthy districts to property poor districts is the most effective of funding models to create equality in school funding. While most effective, under its legislation, students in poverty are experiencing only minimal benefits compared to their wealthier peers. The greatest inequality is found between students in rural areas compared to urban areas, sending about 25% more supplemental funding to rural areas.

Twenty-three states send more funding to their wealthiest districts. Only 1/5th of states spends more money on their neediest schools, half as many as did in 2008. The majority of districts with Title 1 schools, while receiving more federal funds, still see unequal funding for staff and low funds for non-staff costs. Minority students are disproportionately impacted as white students attend low-income schools 18% of the time versus 60% of the time for black and Hispanic students. While funding levels have dropped and remained inequitable, the number of school fundraising organizations, such as Parent Teacher Associations, have risen by 230%. Form 990 filings required for revenues above $25,000 have increased by 300%, and total revenues have increased by 347.7% to 880 million and low-poverty school districts receive a much greater level of these voluntary donations.

Despite some efforts to improve school funding, 60% of schools report that their facilities need repair. Federal COVID relief funds were intended to be used for building upgrades, PPE equipment, and other interpretations that classify as one-time expenses. Some schools could utilize their funds in this way, however, areas with greater need were possibly unable to use federal funds for items such as facility repairs. Immediately pressing issues like teacher salaries, technologies to continue learning, programs to aid learning loss, and more were a priority instead. With an unequal starting place, some are racing to catch up, while others may speed ahead, leaving greater inequalities than they began with.

Inadequate school funding has a disproportionate impact on low-income students and high-poverty schools. Only 14% of fourth graders at poor schools were at or above proficient in reading and reaching 17% in math. In low poverty schools, more than twice as many were at proficiency or above in reading and 60% met or exceed expectations for math. Graduation rates for high poverty schools average at 68% compared to 91% for other schools. The rate of college attendance for those from high poverty districts is 28% versus 52% from wealthier areas. Low-income children are a full year behind by 14, and the total achievement gap between the richest and poorest 10% has grown by 30-40% in 25 years.

== Variance in education funding ==
A variety of education opportunities are found among states due to disparities among average funding for public education. State education funding was analyzed through funding level, distribution, and effort to discover "fairness" levels across the U.S. Funding level is the per pupil funds in a district, funding distribution is the practice of providing greater aid to districts with higher poverty levels, and funding effort is the allocated state and local funding as a percentage of state GDP towards education. While each category of analysis can be dissected individually, they are best understood when combined. Some states measure up to low grades in all criteria like FL, TX, & NV, while states with high grades include DE, OH, NY, WY. The majority fall in the middle.

Ohio, a high performing state, has spent the most on education in fiscal year 23 in state history, and it is only projected to rise. They use a foundation funding formula, implemented in fiscal year 22 along with universal access to scholarships that allow school choice. The formula funds students based on the school they attend instead of their residential area. The base cost accounts for student/teacher ratios, minimum staffing levels, and actual costs to determine unique per student costs. They aim to equalize funding through additional provisions for districts without the capacity or wealth to raise them locally. Ohio also provides supplemental funds based on student needs and demographics, issued to students with disabilities, in career education programs and those who are gifted, economically disadvantaged or learning English.

Florida is on the other end of the spectrum with well below average, inequitable funding and regressive distribution. They operate under the Florida Education Finance Program (FEFP), utilizing federal funds (17%), state general revenue (32%), and local taxes (51%) to distribute funds on a student-by-student basis. During fiscal year 25, Florida's base student allocation decreased, teacher pay was reduced, and school readiness programs to assist low-income families lost funding. Overall money going into the public K-12 school system decreased. Differences in funding levels and effort create great contrast in equitable education opportunities for students.

== Responses ==
The majority of targeted school funding reforms have been in response to court orders, often lawsuits. Protests to change the amount of funding public schools receive are occurring nationwide. Often these lawsuits implement new funding formulas for states to increase equitable funding throughout the state, varying greatly.

Beginning in 1984, the Mexican American Legal Defense and Educational Fund filed a lawsuit against the commissioner of education on behalf of The Edgewood Independent School District in San Antonio School District. In 1989, the method of funding previously used was found to violate the Texas constitution as reliance on local property taxes created a vast inequality. In 1990 a recapture system, known otherwise as the Robin Hood plan, was passed. This system recaptured property taxes raised above a given per student amount and redirected them to property poor districts. To ensure equal spending, 1058 districts were consolidated into 188 County Education districts until 1992, when it was found unconstitutional. In 1993, a new funding formula was settled on, that Texas currency operates under. The formula aims to equalize funding through a multi-option plan. Districts may merge their tax base with a poorer district, send money to the state to pay for poorer students, educate students in districts outside their own through contracts, voluntarily consolidate with one or more districts, or transfer some taxable property to another's tax rolls.

California introduced the Local Control Funding Formula (LCFF) in 2013 with a goal to reduce academic achievement gaps between economically disadvantaged students and their advantaged peers. This formula incrementally distributed $18 Billion of state support over 8 years towards public education. The long-term nature of the plan allowed districts to plan lasting, impactful initiatives rather than singular expenditures. Following three consecutive years with an increase of $1000 in per pupil spending, math and reading achievements, high school graduation and college readiness rates increased, while grade repetition, suspensions and expulsions decreased. Sustained multiyear funding with an instructional focus created the greatest benefit towards increasing student performance. Reduced class sizes, increased teacher salaries and reduced teacher turnover rates are some of the impactful implemented measures created under the school's chosen expenditure of funds.

== See also ==
- San Antonio Independent School District v. Rodriguez
