= Dancing in the Streets =

2006 book by Barbara Ehrenreich

Dancing in the Streets: A History of Collective Joy
- First edition
- Author: Barbara Ehrenreich
- Language: English
- Subject: Social history
- Publisher: Metropolitan Books
- Publication date: January 1, 2006
- Publication place: United States
- Media type: Hardcover
- Pages: 336
- ISBN: 978-0-8050-5723-2
- OCLC: 70718693
- Dewey Decimal: 394.26 22
- LC Class: GT3940 .E47 2007

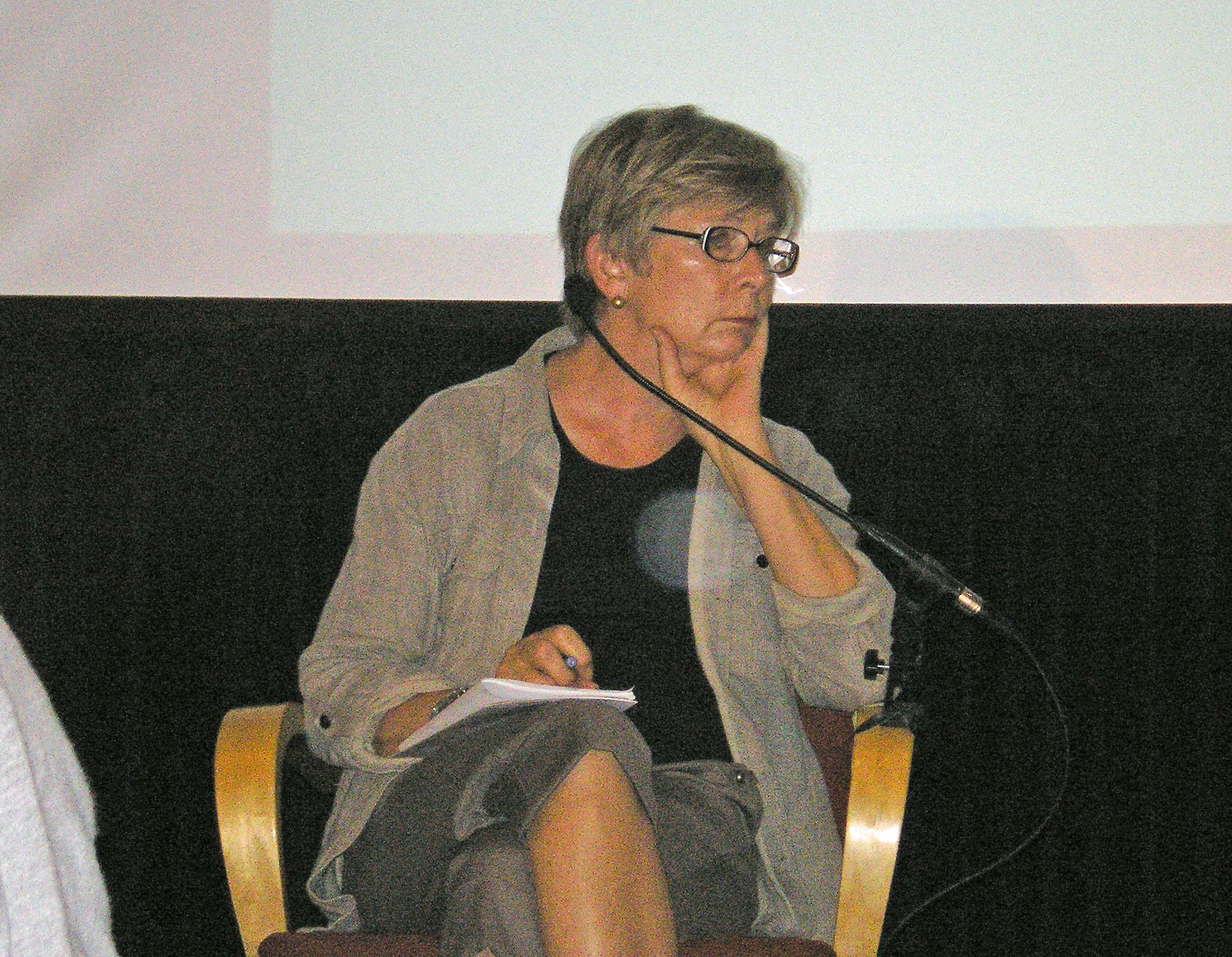
Author Barbara Ehrenreich

Dancing in the Streets: A History of Collective Joy is a book by Barbara Ehrenreich.

== Description ==
Ehrenreich coins the term "collective joy" to describe group events which involve music, synchronized movement, costumes, and a feeling of loss of self. There is no single word in English to describe the phenomenon.

The book describes cycles of creation and suppression of collective joy events. The events generally arise spontaneously and are regarded as dangerous (see Collective hysteria and Riot). The powerful elements of society gradually convert the participants into spectators. This conversion drains the events of their power, and the cycle begins anew. The author describes Western society as particularly lacking in such events and describes current and recent examples of collective joy events.

== Well-known examples of collective joy ==
=== Historical ===
- Woodstock Festival

=== Current ===
- Brazilian Carnival and Mardi Gras
- Burning Man: Possibly the best modern example of collective joy, this event erases social boundaries and encourages participation as a near-religious experience.
- Rock concerts and raves: The example of collective joy most familiar to Americans. The term especially applies to Grateful Dead concerts.
- Love Parade: Costumed dancers and electronic music festival held in many cities around the world.

== Collective joy in transition ==
- Sports fans: The author contends that group movement like "the wave" and costuming (body paint, team colors) represent an attempt by participants to wrest the spectator nature of professional sports back into the realm of collective joy, by making fans active participants in the team events.
- Halloween: In the past three decades, Halloween has changed from a children's to an adults' holiday, including street fairs in major cities such as New York's Village Halloween Parade and San Francisco's Castro District.

== See also ==
- Collective effervescence
- Collective identity
