= Guides Cavalry =

Guides Cavalry (Frontier Force)
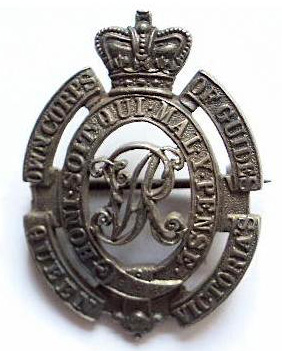
- Active: 14 December 1846 - Present
- Country: (British Raj) British India; Pakistan
- Branch: British Indian Army; Pakistan Army
- Type: Armoured Regiment
- Size: Regiment
- Nickname: The Guides
- Mottos: Rough & Ready
- Uniform: Drab; faced red
- March: "Cavalry Brigade"
- Engagements: North West Frontier of India; Second Sikh War 1848-49; Indian Mutiny 1857-58; Second Afghan War 1878-80; First World War 1914-18; Second World War 1939-45; Indo-Pakistani War of 1965; Indo-Pakistani War of 1971

Commanders
- Notable commanders: Lt Gen Sir Harry Lumsden, KCSI, CB; Gen Sir Sam Browne, VC, GCB, KCSI; Gen Sir Henry Daly, GCB, CIE; Gen Muhammad Zia-ul-Haq; Maj Gen Syed Wajahat Husain; Brig Amir Gulistan Janjua; General Muhammad Yusaf Khan; Lt. Gen. Fazle Haq; Brig. Kazim Mustehsan SI(M); Lt. Gen Gul Hassan Khan

The Guides Cavalry (Frontier Force) is an armoured regiment of the Pakistan Army which was raised in 1846 as The Corps of Guides. During more than a hundred and fifty years of military service, the regiment has earned the reputation of one of the most renowned military units in the world.

== History ==
The Corps of Guides was raised at Peshawar on 14 December 1846 by Lieutenant Harry Burnett Lumsden on the orders of Sir Henry Lawrence, the British Resident at Lahore, capital of the enfeebled Sikh Empire. Initially composed of a troop of cavalry and two companies of infantry mounted on camels, the Guides were organized as a highly mobile force. The corps was ordered to recruit,

Trustworthy men, who could, at a moment's notice, act as guides to troops in the field; men capable, too, of collecting trustworthy intelligence beyond, as well as within, our borders; and, in addition to all this, men, ready to give and take hard blows, whether on the frontier or in a wider field.

These were qualities that would become the hallmark of the Guides. Although the corps recruited men from all over the country and even beyond the Frontier of India, Pathans, Punjabi Muslims, Sikhs and Dogras later formed the bulk of their manpower.

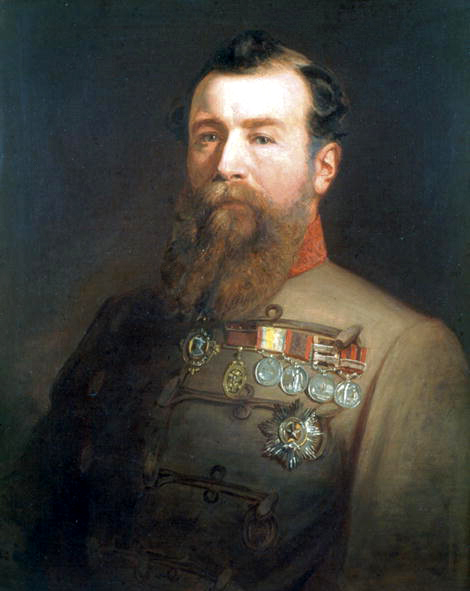
General Sir Harry Lumsden of the Guides. Oil painting by John Maclaren Barclay, c. 1866.

Harry Lumsden was the optimal choice to train and lead this corps d'elite:

He was a man of strong character, athletic, brave, resolute, cool and resourceful in emergency; a man of rare ability and natural aptitude for war, and possessed, moreover, of that magnetic influence which communicates the highest confidence and devotion to those who follow. Lumsden upheld the principle that the greatest and best school for war is war itself. He believed in the elasticity which begets individual self-confidence, and preferred a body of men taught to act and fight with personal intelligence.

Lumsden left a lasting imprint on the Guides, who soon showed their mettle in numerous frontier operations. Believing that fighting troops were for service and not for show, Lumsden introduced loose and comfortable dust-coloured uniforms for the first time, which would soon become famous as "khaki" and within decades would be adopted by most of the armies of the world. In 1851, the Guides established themselves at Mardan, which would remain their cherished home until 1938.

In 1851, The Corps of Guides became part of the Punjab Irregular Force, which later became famous as the Punjab Frontier Force or Piffers. The Piffers consisted of five regiments of cavalry, eleven regiments of infantry and five batteries of artillery besides the Corps of Guides. Their mission was to maintain order on the Punjab Frontier; a task they performed with great aplomb during the next fifty years.

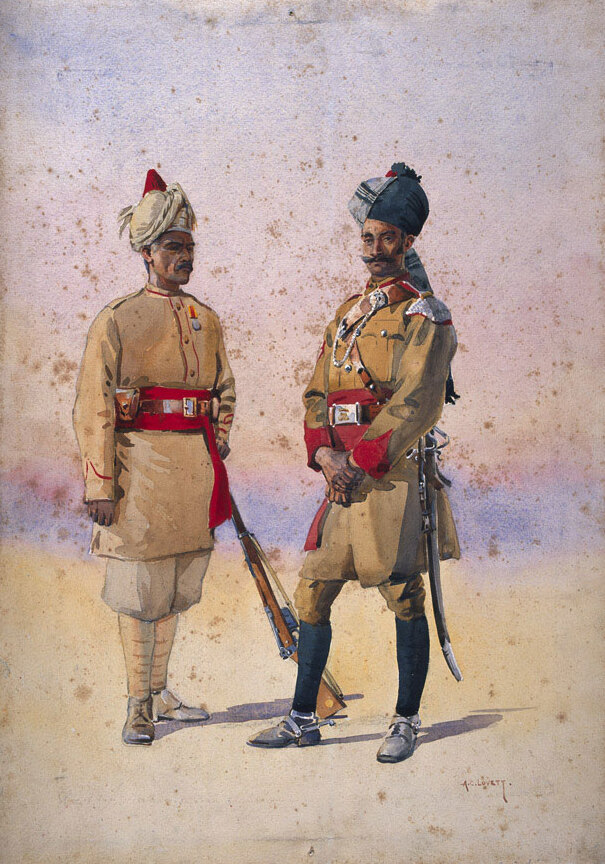
c. 1908 illustration of a Guides Cavalry daffadar (right)

In 1876, Queen Victoria rewarded the Guides by granting them the use of the Royal Cypher and they became Queen's Own Corps of Guides with the Prince of Wales as their Colonel. During the First World War, the cavalry and infantry of the Guides fought separately. In 1921, they were formally separated; the cavalry becoming the 10th Queen Victoria's Own Corps of Guides Cavalry (Frontier Force), while the infantry joined the newly formed 12th Frontier Force Regiment, making up the 5th and 10th (Training) Battalions of the new infantry regiment. The new class composition of Guides Cavalry was Punjabi Muslims, Sikhs and Dogras. The regiment retained its drab uniform with red facings. Their badge consisted of the 'VR' Cypher of Queen Victoria within the Garter, Victorian crown above, surrounded by a ribbon-scroll reading 'Queen Victoria's Own Corps of Guides'. In 1927, the regiment's designation was changed to The Guides Cavalry (10th Queen Victoria's Own Frontier Force).

On the Partition of India in 1947, Guides Cavalry was allotted to Pakistan. The Dogras were exchanged with Punjabi Muslims of the Hodson's Horse, while the Sikhs were exchanged with the Kaimkhanis of the Poona Horse. The regiment also received a squadron of Ranghars from the Scinde Horse.

Out of the six tank regiments given to Pakistan, Probyn’s Horse, 13th and 19th Lancers, were designated as medium armoured regiments. These regiments were equipped with Sherman tanks and formed part of the armored brigade. The Guides, based at Kohat, was also equipped with Sherman tanks when it came under the command of the newly formed 9th (Frontier) Division. Despite having Shermans, it retained its designation as a heavy armored regiment because of the Churchill tanks it was equipped with at Ahmednagar. In 1956, when Pakistan became a republic, all titles pertaining to British royalty were dropped, and the regiment was redesignated as Guides Cavalry (Frontier Force). On 14 February 1981, the Corps of Guides was resurrected with the re-unification of the Guides Infantry and Cavalry in an impressive ceremony at Multan. General Muhammad Iqbal Khan, CJSC, was appointed Colonel of the Corps of Guides.

== Campaigns ==
=== Frontier operations ===
The intrepid Guides quickly made a name for themselves on the North West Frontier of India in numerous operations against the turbulent frontier tribes. Between 1847 and 1878, the corps participated in fifteen major frontier expeditions and operations. Their formidable reputation soon spread far and wide, and was immortalized by Rudyard Kipling in several of his works such as The Ballad of East and West. Around the start of the 20th century, the Guides had acquired such a legendary status that when Robert Baden-Powell, the founder of Boy Scouts, decided to form a similar organization for girls in 1909, he named them Girl Guides after the Corps of Guides. How Girls Can Help to Build Up the Empire, the Girl Guides' handbook has this to say about the Corps of Guides:

On the Indian frontier the mountain tribes are continually fighting, and our troops there are renowned for their splendid achievement and gallant conduct. The best known of all is the corps called "The Guides" … To be a Guide out there means you are one who can be relied upon for pluck, for being able to endure difficulty and danger, for being able cheerfully to take up any job that may be required, and for readiness to sacrifice yourself for others.

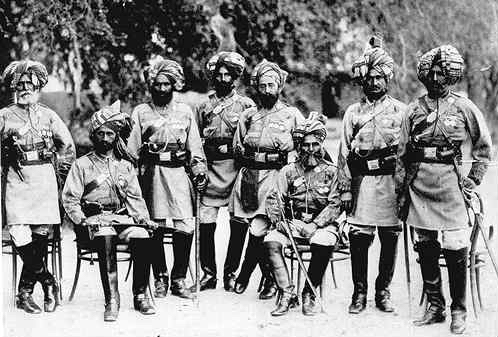
Native Cavalry Officers of the Corps of Guides, 1880.

=== Second Sikh War 1848-49 ===
Following their victory in the First Sikh War of 1845–46, the British posted a Resident at the Sikh Durbar at Lahore to control the affairs of the Sikh state. However, the Sikhs resented British interference in their affairs and began planning a revolt. Early in 1848, Lumsden and his Guides were summoned to Lahore to gather evidence of the planned Sikh insurrection - a mission that they successfully carried out. However, British counter-measures were unable to prevent the revolt, which broke out at Multan in April 1848 and soon spread to the rest of the country. The Guides served at the Siege of Multan and then participated in the Battle of Gujrat on 21 February 1849, where the Sikh Army was decisively defeated. The Second Sikh War resulted in the dissolution of the Sikh state and annexation of the Punjab by the British.

=== The War of Independence of 1857 ===
In March 1857, when the war of independence broke out, Lumsden was on a mission at Kandahar and Captain Henry Daly led the Guides to join the Delhi Field Force then besieging the ancient capital city. They left Hoti Mardan on 13 May and arrived at Delhi on 9 June after marching 580 miles in twenty-six days and fourteen hours in the searing Indian summer temperatures.

The moral effect of the arrival of the Guides in Delhi was perhaps in some measure greater even than the actual fighting strength thus brought into line. The fame of the march from the far distant frontier, the fine physique and martial bearing of soldiers drawn from warlike tribes new to the eyes of their British comrades, ... all tended to give the approach of the travel-stained Guides a high significance. An eye-witness recorded: They came in as firm and light as if they had marched but a single mile.

The Guides went into action the same day and by evening, all of their officers had been killed or wounded. They continued to fight gallantly throughout the summer and took part in the final assault and capture of Delhi. By the time they returned home, they had suffered 350 casualties out of the 600 men who had set out in May. For their gallant conduct at Delhi, they were awarded the distinction of red piping on their tunic collars; an honour shared with the 60th Foot and the Sirmoor Battalion, who fought alongside them at Delhi.

=== Second Afghan War 1878-80 ===
A Risaldar of Guides Cavalry, 1900. Painting by Chater Paul Chater.

During the Second Afghan War of 1878–80, the Guides joined the Peshawar Field Force under General Sir Sam Browne and took part in the capture of Ali Masjid, the advance to Jalalabad and the cavalry action at Fatehabad, where Lieutenant Walter Hamilton won the Victoria Cross for gallantry. Following the Treaty of Gandamak in May 1879, the Afghan King agreed to the presence of a British Mission in Kabul. The mission, led by Sir Louis Cavagnari, arrived in Kabul on 24 July 1879, escorted by a detachment of 76 Guides under Lieutenant Hamilton, VC. However, on 3 September, a disgruntled regiment of the Afghan Army attacked the British Residency. Although the Afghans offered quarter to the Indian ranks, the Guides chose to fight to the death. The Residency finally fell after twelve hours of fierce resistance by the Guides, who perished to the last man along with 600 of their foes. The sacrifice of these gallant men is commemorated in the impressive Guides Memorial at Mardan with the following words:

The annals of no army and no regiment can show a brighter record of devoted bravery than has been achieved by this small band of Guides.

The epic stand of the Guides at Kabul Residency was immortalized by MM Kaye in her bestselling novel The Far Pavilions and in the 1984 motion picture of the same name.

The massacre at Kabul led to the resumption of hostilities and in December 1879, the Guides were dispatched to join the Kabul Field Force under General Sir Frederick Roberts at Sherpur Cantonment near Kabul. They participated in the attacks on Takht-i-Shah and Asmai Heights, where Captain Arthur Hammond won the Victoria Cross for conspicuous gallantry.

After the Second Afghan War, the Guides were involved in a number of actions along the North West Frontier including the Relief of Chitral in 1895, as part of Malakand and Buner Field Forces during the Frontier Uprising of 1897–98, and in the Mohmand Expedition of 1908. In 1906, the Corps of Guides was reorganized into separates units of cavalry and infantry within the corps.

=== First World War ===
On the outbreak of World War I, the Guides initially remained in India for service on the Frontier; the Guides Cavalry participating in the Mohmand Blockade in 1915. In November 1917, they joined the 11th Indian Cavalry Brigade in Mesopotamia and fought in the Battles of Sharqat and Khan Baghdadi. After the armistice, they remained in Persia as part of Norperforce to counter any threat to British interests from the Russian Bolsheviks and Persian socialists. They returned to India in 1921. Meanwhile, the Guides Infantry served in Mesopotamia and Palestine. The end of the war also spelt the end of the Corps of Guides as a unit. In the post-war reorganization of the Indian Army in 1921, the corps was broken up and the cavalry and infantry became separate units.

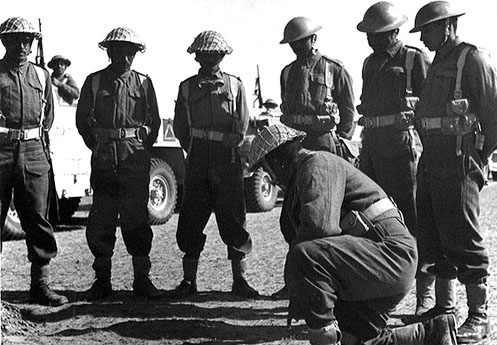
Guides Cavalry in North Africa, 1942.

=== Second World War ===
On 26 September 1940, the Guides Cavalry was mechanized as a Light Reconnaissance Regiment equipped with wheeled armoured carriers and 15 cwt trucks. In May 1941, it was dispatched to Iraq. The regiment took part in the Anglo-Soviet invasion of Iran, when one of its squadrons, supported by an infantry battalion, stormed and captured the city of Khorramshahr on 25 August. In June 1942, the regiment arrived in North Africa and covered the British Eighth Army's open desert flank as it withdrew towards Egypt after the debacle at Gazala. The Guides Cavalry returned to Iraq in September 1942. In November 1943, it proceeded to Kohat in India, where it was converted into an Armoured Car Regiment for operations on the North West Frontier. The regiment received its first tanks in November 1945, when it was equipped with Stuart tanks. In 1946, the Stuarts were replaced with Churchill tanks.

=== Indo-Pakistan War 1965 ===
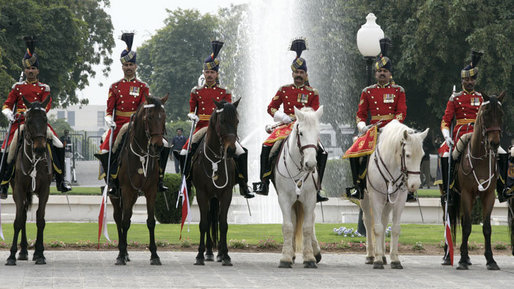
The Honor Guards from the Guides Cavalry Regiment, in traditional Red Coat, welcoming the U.S. President George W. Bush at the Presidency in Islamabad in 2006.

During the Indo-Pakistani War of 1965, Guides Cavalry was part of the 6 Armoured Division, equipped with M48 Patton tanks. The regiment, under the command of Lieutenant Colonel Amir Gulistan Janjua, greatly distinguished itself in the Battle of Chawinda, considered to be the greatest tank battle since World War II. On 7 September 1965, the Indians opened their main offensive with one armoured and three infantry divisions in the Sialkot Sector and penetrated up to Phillaura. However, in an audacious action, 25 Cavalry threw back the Indian armoured division, which took two days to regain its balance. In the meantime, 6 Armoured Division was inducted to counter the enemy on the Chawinda Front. The Guides Cavalry was deployed at Badiana, west of Chawinda to protect the division's left flank. On 11 September, the Indians renewed their offensive but were unable to capture the pivotal position of Chawinda. They also made a flanking move towards Bhagowal and Khakanwali in the west, where they were effectively checked by the Guides Cavalry. On 14 September, the Indians resumed their attack but again, could not breach the defences of Chawinda. At the same time, they tried to outflank the town from the west. It was here that the decisive tank battles of the war were fought in which Guides Cavalry covered itself in glory. The regiment was part of an ad hoc Task Force guarding the area between Chawinda and Sialkot. The Guides Cavalry was engaged in fierce fighting near Badiana, where it beat back repeated Indian attacks and inflicted heavy losses on the enemy armour. The regiment was awarded five Sitara-i-Jurat for its excellent performance in the war.

== Battle honours ==
- Mooltan, Goojerat, Punjaub, Delhi 1857
- Ali Masjid, Kabul 1879, Afghanistan 1878-80
- Chitral, Punjab Frontier, Malakand, Khan Baghdadi, Sharqat, Mesopotamia 1917-18
- NW Frontier, India 1915, Afghanistan 1919
- Bir Hacheim, Minqar Qaim, Deir el Shein, North Africa 1940-43
- Chawinda 1965.

== Victoria Cross recipients ==
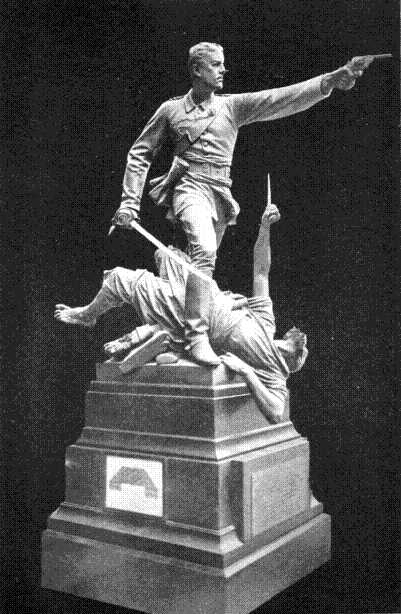
Silver statuette commemorating Lieutenant WRP Hamilton, VC.

- Lieutenant RH Shebbeare, Delhi, 14 September 1857
- Lieutenant WRP Hamilton, Fatehabad, Afghanistan, 2 April 1879
- Captain AG Hammond, Asmai Heights, Afghanistan, 14 December 1879
- Major RB Adams, Landakai, Swat, 17 August 1897
- Lieutenant HLS Maclean, Landakai, Swat, 17 August 1897
- Captain Godfrey Meynell VC MC, Nahaqqi Pass, 29 September 1935

== Changes in title ==
- 1846 The Corps of Guides
- 1851 The Corps of Guides, Punjab Irregular Force
- 1865 Corps of Guides, Punjab Frontier Force
- 1876 Queen's Own Corps of Guides, Punjab Frontier Force
- 1901 Queen's Own Corps of Guides
- 1904 Queen's Own Corps of Guides (Lumsden's)
- 1906 Queen Victoria's Own Corps of Guides (Frontier Force) (Lumsden's) Cavalry
- 1922 10th Queen Victoria's Own Corps of Guides Cavalry (Frontier Force)
- 1927 The Guides Cavalry (10th Queen Victoria's Own Frontier Force)
- 1956 Guides Cavalry (Frontier Force)

== Affiliations and alliances ==
- (Pakistan) 2nd Battalion (Guides) The Frontier Force Regiment
- (Pakistan) The Frontier Force Regiment
- (United Kingdom) King's Royal Hussars
