= Guides Infantry =

2nd Battalion (Guides) The Frontier Force Regiment
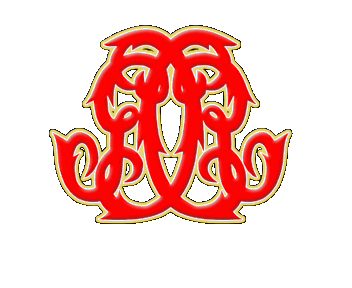
- Active: 1846 - Present
- Country: (British Raj) British India; Pakistan
- Branch: British Indian Army; Pakistan Army
- Type: Mechanized Infantry
- Size: Battalion
- Nickname: Guides Paltan
- Mottos: Rough & Ready
- Uniform: Drab; faced scarlet red
- March: Advance Khaki
- Mascot: CG
- Anniversaries: 14 December
- Engagements: North West Frontier of India; Second Sikh War 1848-49; India Mutiny 1857-58; Second Afghan War 1878-80; First World War 1914-18; Third Afghan War 1919; Second World War 1939-45; Kashmir War 1948; Indo-Pakistan War 1965; Indo-Pakistan War 1971; Operation Zarb-e-Azb

Commanders
- Colonel of the Regiment: Lt Gen Muhammad Aqeel, HI(M)
- Notable commanders: Lt Gen Sir Harry Lumsden, KCSI, CB; Gen Sir Sam Browne, VC, GCB, KCSI; Gen Sir Henry Daly, GCB, CIE; Gen M Iqbal Khan, NI (M), SBt; Maj Gen Mustafa Anwar Hussain; Maj Gen Waheed Arshad Gejial; Maj Gen Bilal Ahmed; Lt Gen Mumtaz Gul, HI(M); Brig Yasub Ali Dogar, SI(M), S Bt, Lt Gen Syed Sabahat Husain, HI(M); Lt Gen Hassan Azhar Hayat, HI(M); Lt Gen Inayat Husain, HI(M); Maj Gen Aneeq Malik, HI(M); Maj Gen Mazhar Nazir, HI(M); Maj Gen Ali Ejaz Rafi; Brig Nadeem Rahmatullah Khan, SI(M)

The Guides Infantry, or 2nd Battalion (Guides) The Frontier Force Regiment, is an infantry battalion of the Pakistan Army. It was raised in 1846 as part of the famous Corps of Guides, a highly mobile force to act as guides to troops in the field and gather intelligence beyond the borders of British India. The corps recruited men from various backgrounds, with Pathans, Punjabi Muslims, Sikhs, and Dogras forming the majority of their manpower. Under the leadership of Lieutenant Harry Burnett Lumsden, the Guides gained a formidable reputation and introduced the dust-colored "khaki" uniforms, later adopted by the British Army in India. The corps became part of the Punjab Frontier Force, known as Piffers, which maintained order on the Punjab Frontier for fifty years.

The Guides participated in numerous frontier operations, earning recognition for their gallantry and resilience. They fought in the Second Sikh War, played a crucial role in the suppression of the Indian Mutiny in Delhi, and served in the Second Afghan War, where they defended the British Residency in Kabul. During World War I, the Guides raised additional battalions and fought in Mesopotamia and Palestine. Following the war, the Corps of Guides was reorganized, with the cavalry and infantry becoming separate units. In the Second World War, the Guides Infantry served in Iraq and Iran.

The Guides Infantry demonstrated their valor in the Indo-Pakistan wars of 1948 and 1965. In 1948, they defended the Kishenganga Valley in Kashmir, and in 1965, they established a bridgehead for the 1st Armored Division across the India-Pakistan border. The Guides Infantry also participated in the Rann of Kutch Conflict in 1965, capturing Indian positions and earning several awards for their bravery. Throughout their history, the Guides Infantry played a vital role in frontier operations and earned a reputation as a brave and dependable force.

== Historical overview ==
The Corps of Guides was raised at Peshawar on 14 December 1846 by Lieutenant Harry Burnett Lumsden on the orders of Sir Henry Lawrence, the British Resident at Lahore, capital of the Sikh Empire. Initially composed of a troop of cavalry and two companies of infantry mounted on camels, the Guides were organized as a highly mobile force. The corps was ordered to recruit:

trustworthy men, who could, at a moment's notice, act as guides to troops in the field; men capable, too, of collecting trustworthy intelligence beyond, as well as within, our borders; and, in addition to all this, men, ready to give and take hard blows, whether on the frontier or in a wider field.

Although the corps recruited men from all over the country and even beyond the Frontier of India, Pathans, Punjabi Muslims, Sikhs and Dogras later formed the bulk of their manpower.

Harry Lumsden was chosen to train and lead the force:

He was a man of strong character, athletic, brave, resolute, cool and resourceful in emergency; a man of rare ability and natural aptitude for war, and possessed, moreover, of that magnetic influence which communicates the highest confidence and devotion to those who follow. Lumsden upheld the principle that the greatest and best school for war is war itself. He believed in the elasticity which begets individual self-confidence, and preferred a body of men taught to act and fight with personal intelligence.

Lumsden left a lasting imprint on the Guides, who first fought in numerous frontier operations. Believing that fighting troops were for service and not for show, Lumsden introduced loose and comfortable dust-coloured uniforms for the first time, which would soon become famous as "khaki" and within decades would be adopted by the British Army for service in India. In 1851, the Guides established themselves at Mardan, which would remain their home until 1938.

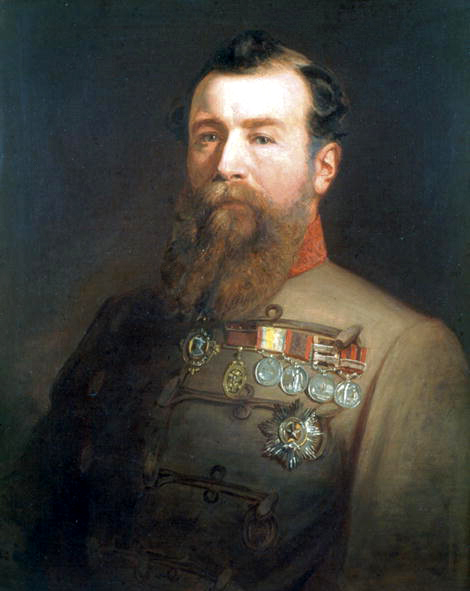
c. 1866 portrait of Sir Harry Lumsden

In 1851, the Corps of Guides became part of the Punjab Irregular Force, which later became famous as the Punjab Frontier Force or Piffers. The Piffers consisted of five regiments of cavalry, eleven regiments of infantry and five batteries of artillery besides the Corps of Guides. Their mission was to maintain order on the Punjab Frontier; a task they performed efficiently during the next fifty years.

In 1876, Queen Victoria rewarded the Guides by granting them the use of the Royal Cypher and they became the Queen's Own Corps of Guides with the Prince of Wales as their Colonel. During the First World War, the cavalry and infantry of the Guides fought separately. During the war, the Guides Infantry raised three more battalions. The 3rd and 4th Guides Infantry were disbanded after the war. In 1921, the cavalry and infantry components were formally separated; the cavalry becoming the 10th Queen Victoria's Own Corps of Guides Cavalry (Frontier Force), while the infantry joined the newly formed 12th Frontier Force Regiment to make up the 5th and 10th (Queen Victoria's Own Corps of Guides) Battalions of the new infantry regiment. The 10th became the Training Battalion of the regiment. Their new class composition was one company each of Punjabi Muslims, Pathans, Sikhs and Dogras. The regiment adopted the drab uniform with red facings of the Corps of Guides. In 1943, the 10th (Training) Battalion was converted into the 12th Frontier Force Regimental Centre, while in 1945, '12' was dropped from the regiment's designation, changing it to The Frontier Force Regiment.

On the Partition of India in 1947, the Frontier Force Regiment was allotted to Pakistan. The Sikhs and Dogras were transferred to India and the new class composition of the regiment became Punjabi Muslims and Pathans in equal proportion. In 1956, the Frontier Force Rifles and Pathan Regiment were merged with the Frontier Force Regiment and all the battalions were re-numbered. At the same time, since Pakistan had become a republic, all titles pertaining to British royalty were dropped. Consequently, the Guides Infantry was redesignated as the 2nd Battalion (Guides) The Frontier Force Regiment or 2 FF (Guides).

== Campaigns ==
=== Frontier operations ===
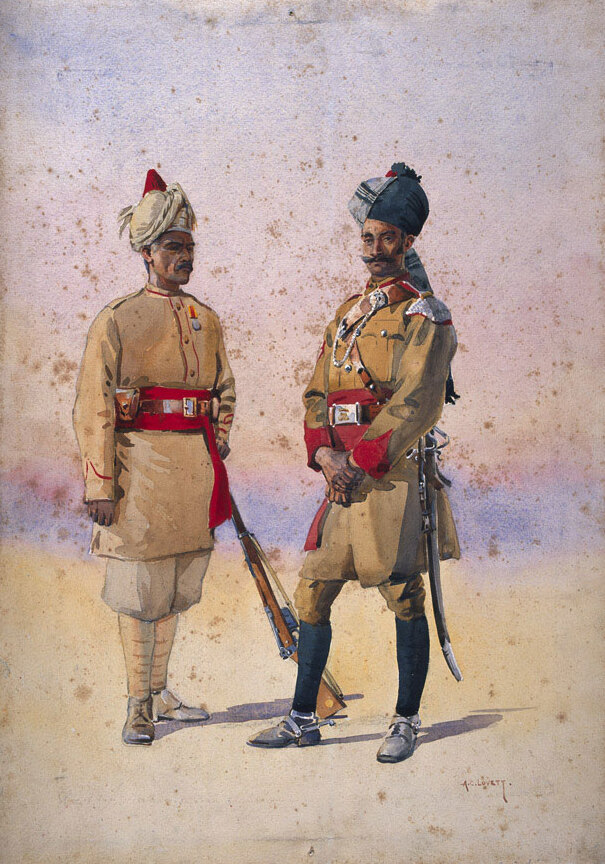
c. 1908 illustration of a Guides Infantry sepoy (left)

The intrepid Guides quickly made a name for themselves on the North West Frontier of India in numerous operations against the turbulent frontier tribes. Between 1847 and 1878, the corps participated in fifteen major frontier expeditions and operations. Their formidable reputation soon spread far and wide, and was immortalized by Rudyard Kipling in several of his works such as The Ballad of East and West. By around the start of the 20th century, the Guides had acquired such a legendary status that when Robert Baden-Powell, the founder of Boy Scouts, decided to form a similar organization for girls in 1909, he named them Girl Guides after the Corps of Guides. How Girls Can Help to Build Up the Empire, the Girl Guides' handbook has this to say about the Corps of Guides:

On the Indian frontier the mountain tribes are continually fighting, and our troops there are renowned for their splendid achievement and gallant conduct. The best known of all is the corps called "The Guides" … To be a Guide out there means you are one who can be relied upon for pluck, for being able to endure difficulty and danger, for being able cheerfully to take up any job that may be required, and for readiness to sacrifice yourself for others.

=== Second Sikh War 1848–1849 ===
Following their victory in the First Sikh War of 1845–1846, the British posted a Resident at the Sikh Durbar at Lahore to control the affairs of the Sikh state. However, the Sikhs resented British interference in their affairs and began planning a revolt. Early in 1848, Lumsden and his Guides were summoned to Lahore to gather evidence of the planned Sikh insurrection - a mission that they successfully carried out. However, British counter-measures were unable to prevent the revolt, which broke out at Multan in April 1848 and soon spread to the rest of the country. The Guides served at the Siege of Multan and then participated in the Battle of Gujrat on 21 February 1849, where the Sikh Army was decisively defeated. The Second Sikh War resulted in the dissolution of the Sikh state and annexation of the Punjab by the British.

=== The Great Indian Mutiny of 1857 ===
In May 1857, when the mutiny broke out, Lumsden was on a mission at Kandahar and Captain Henry Daly led the Guides to join the Delhi Field Force then besieging the ancient capital city. They left Hoti Mardan on 13 May and arrived at Delhi on 9 June after marching 580 miles in twenty-six days and fourteen hours in the searing Indian summer.

The moral effect of the arrival of the Guides in Delhi was perhaps in some measure greater even than the actual fighting strength thus brought into line. The fame of the march from the far distant frontier, the fine physique and martial bearing of soldiers drawn from warlike tribes new to the eyes of their British comrades, ... all tended to give the approach of the travel-stained Guides a high significance. An eyewitness recorded: They came in as firm and light as if they had marched but a single mile.

The Guides went into action the same day and by evening, all of their officers were killed or wounded. They continued to fight gallantly throughout the summer and took part in the final assault and capture of Delhi. By the time they returned home, they had suffered 350 casualties out of the 600 men who had set out in May. For their gallant conduct at Delhi, they were awarded the distinction of red piping on their tunic collars; an honour shared with the 60th Foot and the Sirmoor Rifles, who fought alongside them at Delhi.

=== Second Afghan War 1878–1880 ===
During the Second Afghan War of 1878–1880, the Guides joined the Peshawar Field Force under General Sir Sam Browne and took part in the capture of Ali Masjid, the advance to Jalalabad and the cavalry action at Fatehabad, where Lieutenant Walter Hamilton won the Victoria Cross for gallantry. Following the Treaty of Gandamak in May 1879, the Afghan King agreed to the presence of a British Mission in Kabul. The mission, led by Sir Louis Cavagnari, arrived in Kabul on 24 July 1879, escorted by a detachment of 76 Guides under Lieutenant Hamilton, VC. However, on 3 September, a disgruntled regiment of the Afghan Army attacked the British Residency. Although the Afghans offered quarter to the Indian ranks, the Guides chose to fight to the death. The Residency finally fell after twelve hours of fierce resistance by the Guides, who perished to the last man along with 600 of their foes. The sacrifice of these gallant men is commemorated in the impressive Guides Memorial at Mardan with the following words:

Corps of Guides Infantry, Afghanistan, 1880.

The annals of no army and no regiment can show a brighter record of devoted bravery than has been achieved by this small band of Guides.

The epic stand of the Guides at Kabul Residency was immortalized by MM Kaye in her bestselling novel The Far Pavilions and in the 1984 motion picture of the same name.

The massacre at Kabul led to the resumption of hostilities and in December 1879, the Guides were dispatched to join the Kabul Field Force under General Sir Frederick Roberts at Sherpur Cantonment near Kabul. They participated in the attacks on Takht-i-Shah and Asmai Heights, where Captain Arthur Hammond won the Victoria Cross for conspicuous gallantry.

After the Second Afghan War, the Guides were involved in a number of actions along the North West Frontier including the Relief of Chitral in 1895, as part of Malakand and Buner Field Forces during the Frontier Uprising of 1897-98, and in the Mohmand Expedition of 1908. In 1906, the Corps of Guides was reorganized into separates units of cavalry and infantry within the corps.

=== First World War ===
At the outbreak of World War I, the Corps of Guides initially remained in India for service on the Frontier; both Guides Infantry and Cavalry participating in the Mohmand Blockade in 1915. In January 1917, a second battalion of Guides Infantry was raised by Captain RCG Pollock at Mardan. In October, the 3rd Guides Infantry was raised by Colonel GP Villiers Stuart, also at Mardan, while the 4th Guides Infantry was raised in October 1918 by Lieutenant ND Douglas at Nowshera. In 1917, the 1st Guides Infantry joined the 7th (Meerut) Division in Mesopotamia and fought in the action of Tikrit. In 1918, both 1st and 2nd Guides Infantry served in Palestine and took part in the Battle of Megiddo, which led to the annihilation of Turkish Army in Palestine. The 3rd Guides Infantry served in the Third Afghan War of 1919. It was disbanded in August 1921. The 4th Guides Infantry was disbanded in December 1918.

The end of the war also spelt the end of the Corps of Guides as a unit. In the post-war reorganization of the Indian Army in 1921, the corps was broken up and the cavalry and infantry became separate units, with the two battalions of Guides Infantry joining the 12th Frontier Force Regiment as its 5th and 10th Battalions.

=== Second World War ===
Corps of Guides Infantry, 1887

During the Second World War, the Guides Infantry or 5th Battalion (QVO Corps of Guides) 12th FF Regiment, served throughout in Iraq and Iran, guarding against the German threat from the north. They were not engaged in any fighting.

=== Indo-Pakistan War 1948 ===
The Guides Infantry made up for its lack of action during the Second World War by giving an excellent account of itself in Kashmir in 1948. The battalion was instrumental in checking the Indian offensive in the Kishenganga Valley, where it fought with great gallantry at Tithwal and foiled all enemy efforts at advance. Jemadar Dost Muhammad's platoon of the Guides were defending Richmar Gali, near Tithwal. Coming under attack from approximately 700 Indian soldiers, he ordered a bayonet charge as a last ditch effort, leading to his death and the capture of Richmar Gali by the Indians. His actions delayed the Indian army, long enough for the 10th Brigade of 7th Infantry Division to prepare defences along the Panjkot Nullah, preventing their advance. The Guides suffered casualties of 37 killed and 105 wounded, and were awarded eleven gallantry awards.

=== Indo-Pakistan War 1965 ===
In 1965 the Guides Infantry (2FF) was camping at Kasur where A and D companies of the battalion were carrying watermanship training at Thaman Distributary near Luliani after they had moved from the Rann of Katch area. The battalion was assigned the task of establishing a bridge head on Rohhi Nullah for launching of 1 Armoured Division across the India – Pakistan border. A and D companies joined the Paltan at about 1230 hrs. The Guides moved out from the camp to cross the border. The battalion crossed the Rohi Nullah on foot and entered the enemy territory on night 6/7 Sep 1965 and established a bridge head for the armoured division. After the launching of the division, the battalion was put under 21 Bde which was part of 11th Infantry Division. On 12 September the Guides Infantry and 5 Frontier Force captured the Indian town of Khem Karan. The battalion advanced up to Bhura Khana a small village in the north of the Khem Karan. On 17 Sep 1965 it was ordered to come back and take defence positions in front of Khem Kharan. On the night 21/22 September 1965 C company position was shelled heavily and was attacked by Indian troops who succeeded in overrunning part of a forward platoon. A counter-attack was launched by C company which recovered the position. During the conflict, the Guides Infantry were awarded one Tamgha-i-Jurat and two C-in-C Commendation cards.

Rann of Kutch Conflict – April 1965.

The trouble began in March 1965 when India started interfering with Pakistan Rangers patrol in Kanger Kot area. Immediately they took a further step and laid their claim on the Kanger Kot Fort. To back it with force they started amassing troops in the Rann of Kutch. Consequently, some troops of Pakistan Army including the Guides Infantry were promptly dispatched to deal with the situation. The Guides Infantry attacked and captured the strong points of the Indian Army at Biarbet and captured the position being defended by famous Indian PARA Brigade (Guides Infantry marks 12 April as Biarbet day). An area of approx five to six miles was captured and cleared of the Indians immediately. In this small battle the battalion was awarded two Tamgha-e-Jurat, Four Imtiazi Sanads and one C-in-C Commendation Card.

Honours

Tamgh-e-Jurat

- Lance Havildar Khaki Jan
- Naik Atta Khan

Imtiazi Sanad

- Lt Col Muhammad Iqbal Khan ( Later General)
- Captain Bilal Ahmed ( Later Maj General)
- Captain S J Babar ( Later Chief Commissioner Peshawar)
- Sepoy Din Bad Shah

Commendation Card

- Subedar Ali Asghar
- Havildar Muhammad Razak Khan
- Sepoy Noor Jamal

=== Indo-Pakistani War of 1971 ===
On 3 October 1971 during the war, the battalion was deployed to the Chakothi area to defend the Sirinager-to-Muzaffarabad road in the Uri section. C Company was sent to defend the Lipa valley, joined by elements of the Tochi Scouts. Lipa was defended under second-in-command Abdul Hamid Afridi. On 8 November, Indian forces attacked two patrols of C Company at Shisha Ladi with the intent of capturing the Lipa valley. The final attack was repulsed at 04:15. At 08:00 the second attack began with heavy artillery fire, incurring many casualties by 10:30. Major Aziz Ahmed, Samandar Shah and three jawans held Shahadat. Members of the battalion received a Sitara-e-Jurat, a Tamgha-i-Jurat and an Imtiazi Sanad. (This entire description needs re-visiting. 2 FF was deployed in Chakothi sector, with battalion HQ at Chakothi, a company deployed on Sugna-Ziarat ridge, A company at Parat and another company which repulsed the Indian infiltration of Ziarat ridge under the command of Captain Gulzar Ahmed Wazir. The fourth company under Major Aziz Ahmed was detached to Lipa Valley where it fought a glorious action on Shisha Ladi ridge, "R" battery of 25 Composite Mountain Regiment (Artillery) was in support. It was commanded by Lt Col Abdul Hameed Khan in 1971.)

==== Awards ====
- Sitara-e-Jurat: Major Aziz Ahmed. He embraced shahdat near Zairat post in Khalana valley. A post is named after him in this area, titled as 'Aziz Post'.
- Tamgha-e-Jurrat: Naib Subedar Muhammad Bashir
- Commendation Card: Jumma Khan

== Battle honours ==
Mooltan, Goojerat, Punjaub, Delhi 1857, Ali Masjid, Kabul 1879, Afghanistan 1878-80, Chitral, Punjab Frontier, Malakand, Mesopotamia 1917-18, Megiddo, Sharon, Palestine 1918, NW Frontier, India 1914-15, Afghanistan 1919, Kashmir 1948, Rann of Kutch 1965, Khem Karan 1965.

== Victoria Cross recipients ==
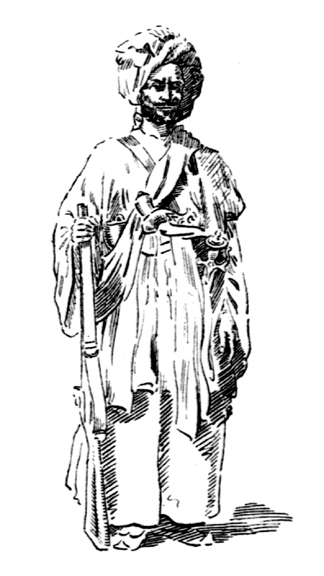
A sepoy of the Corps of Guides, 1853. Sketch by AC Lovett, 1910.

- Lieutenant RH Shebbeare, Delhi, 14 September 1857
- Lieutenant WRP Hamilton, Fatehabad, Afghanistan, 2 April 1879
- Captain AG Hammond, Asmai Heights, Afghanistan, 14 December 1879
- Major RB Adams, Landakai, Swat, 17 August 1897
- Lieutenant HLS Maclean, Landakai, Swat, 17 August 1897
- Captain GMC Meynell, Mohmand, North West Frontier, 29 September 1935

== Changes in title ==
- 1846 The Corps of Guides
- 1851 The Corps of Guides, Punjab Irregular Force
- 1865 Corps of Guides, Punjab Frontier Force
- 1876 Queen's Own Corps of Guides, Punjab Frontier Force
- 1901 Queen's Own Corps of Guides
- 1904 Queen's Own Corps of Guides (Lumsden's)
- 1906 Queen Victoria's Own Corps of Guides (Frontier Force) (Lumsden's) Infantry
- 1917 1st Battalion Queen Victoria's Own Corps of Guides (Frontier Force) (Lumsden’s) Infantry
- 1922 5th Battalion (Queen Victoria's Own Corps of Guides) 12th Frontier Force Regiment
- 1945 5th Battalion (Queen Victoria's Own Corps of Guides) The Frontier Force Regiment
- 1956 2nd Battalion (Guides) The Frontier Force Regiment

== Affiliations and alliances ==
- (Pakistan) The Guides Cavalry
- (United Kingdom) The Rifles

== References and notes ==
http://www.radio.gov.pk/03-04-2019/pakistan-army-approves-promotion-of-40-brigadiers-to-major-general
