= Mohmand Expedition of 1908 =

British punitive expedition

First Mohmand campaign
Date	1908
Location	Peshawar border of the North West Frontier
Result	British-Indian victory

Belligerents
Mohmands	(United Kingdom) British Empire; India

Casualties and losses
450+ killed	(United Kingdom) 15 killed (British Raj) 37 killed

The Mohmand Expedition of 1908 was a British punitive expedition against Mohmand rebels in the British Raj.

== Description of the Mohmands ==
=== Mohmand tribes ===
In 1908, the Mohmands were primarily divided into two main branches: the Independent Mohmands, who lived across the Administrative border, and those dwelling in and around Matanni and in the south-western corner of the Peshawar district. Mohmands of the Peshawar district had, however, long lost touch with those of the hills, and were in no way connected with the outbreak in the spring of 1908.

The trans-border Mohmands may be considered as having been subdivided into the following eight clans: Baezai, Khwaizai, Tarakzai, Halimzai, Utmanzai, Dawezai, Isa Khel and Burhan Khel. (Note: Strictly speaking, the Isa Khel and Burhan Khel were branches of the Tarakzai clan, but they had long since broken away from the latter and now formed distinct clans by themselves.) Of these, the last six, known as the assured clans—together with the Musa Khel section of the Baezai—were in receipt of allowances from the British Government, granted in lieu of those which, prior to the Durand agreement, certain of them had received from the Amirs of Kabul.

The Baezai and Khwaizai clans received no British allowances, and consider themselves subject to Afghan authority alone. They resided largely on the Afghan side of the Durand Line, which had, however, never yet been demarcated in Mohmand territory and was still a subject of dispute.

=== Mohmand fighting strength ===
The total fighting strength of the Mohmands was estimated in 1907 at 21,500 men with about 1,850 breech-loading rifles. Of the above, about 11,000 men and 750 rifles belonged to the Afghan clans.

Since then many more breech-loaders were known to have passed into the country—a result of the successful smuggling of firearms from Masqat in the Persian Gulf into Baluchistan—and thence to Afghanistan and the North-West Frontier. Naturally, however, this estimate gives us no true idea of what strength the Mohmands could actually put in the field. This can best be calculated from the numbers opposed to the British in the actions at Matta and Shabkadar on 24 April 1908, which were approximately as follows:

Tribe	Men
Musa Khel Baezai	1,000
Koda Khel Baezai	120
Other Baezai	5,000
Khawizai	300
Kamali Halimzai	500
Dawezai	400
Utmanzai	300
Total	8,620
In addition to these the Mohmand Lashkar was swelled by:	
Utman Khel of Ambahar	1,000
Ningraharis	3,000
Kandahari Safis	2,000
Men from Kunar	3,000
Total	9,000

=== Mohmand country ===
Mohmand country proper—i.e., omitting the affiliated clans of Shilmanis and Mullagoris, who lived on the right bank of the Kabul river, and whose interests were entirely distinct from those of other Mohmands—was bounded, roughly, on the north by the Ambahar valley and Utman Khel country, on the east by the Swat river and Utman Khel country, on the south-east by the administrative border of the Peshawar district, and on the south by the Kabul river; to the west it extends up to about the longitude of the Kunar River in Afghanistan, and there were also some large Mohmand villages south of the Kabul river in Ningrahar.

The country (on the British side of the Durand line) thus enclosed was, with a few exceptions, exceedingly wild, rugged and desolate. The hills almost throughout were practically waterless, except, of course, during the autumn and winter rains, and the inhabitants depend largely for their water-supply on artificial tanks, which caught and store rainwater and surface drainage. That the soil was fertile, however, and only needs a sufficient rainfall to produce excellent crops, was evident from the fact that the expeditionary forced of 1908 found large areas covered with standing wheat and barley.

The principal valley in the country was the Bohai Dag, known in its lowered portion as the Danish kol. This valley ran roughly east and west right across the Mohmand country, from the Silala Sar to the Swat River, which it joined about 13 miles above Abazai, and had a total length of 40 miles and an elevation varying from 3,000 to 1,500 feet. The upper part of the valley was broad and opened, but for the last 10 miles of its course the hills closed in, and the valley becomes a narrowed rocky gorge.

No water was found by the British in the bed of the Nala much above Mulla Kalai, about 6 miles from its junction with the swat, either in the expedition of 1897 or in 1908. In its upper portion, the Bohai Dag was inhabited by the Baezai and Khwaizai clans, lowered down by the Halimzai and Isa Khel.

About 7 miles above its junction with the Swat river, the Bohai Dag, or Danish Kol as it was here called, was joined by the Yalch Dand Nala. This valley rose to the north of the Bedmanai passed under the name of the Mitai Nala, and flowed south and then east to join the Danish Kol. No water was found flowing above this junction either in the expedition of 1897 or that of 1908. At its head, it was inhabited by the Musa Khel section of the Baezai, and near its junction with the Danish Kol by the Halimzai and Utmanzai, while between the two, in a very opened portion of the valley, dwell the vassal clan of Safis.

Bordering the territories of the Kandahari Safis on the northeast and the Utmanzai on the north, lied the Sarlara hills. At the foot of the northern slopes of this range flowed the Pipal Nala—almost due west to east. In the upper portion of this valley lived the Gurbaz Safis, and lowered down the Dawezai.

Running water appeared in the large watercourse of the Pipal a short distance above its junction with the Ambahar stream, Where it flowed roughly north to south.

The valley of the Ambahar bounds Mohmand country on the east to its junction with the Danish Kol, shortly before that stream itself joined the Swat river. It was extremely fertile, running water was plentiful below the junction of the Pipal Nala, and large tracts were under irrigation. The inhabitants were Utman Khel who received their punishment with the Mohmands for the part they took in the disturbances necessitating the despatch of the expedition of 1908.

Midway between the Swat and Kabul rivers, and roughly parallel to both, ran the Gandao valley, in which lied the principal settlements of the halimzai. Its length from its head to the pointed where it enters British territory northwest of Shabkadar was about 16 miles, but the inhabited portion of the valley was confined to a stretched of about 5 miles above the Karappa passed with an average elevation of 2,500 feet. Here both banks were thickly studded with villages, which obtain excellent crops by irrigation. Water has not appeared on the surface of the nala -bed above durba khel, near the centre of this inhabited stretched, but above this pointed there were numerous Persian wells by which water was raised for irrigation purposes from a depth of 30 or 40 feet.

Between the Gandao and the Swat river lied the Pandiali valley, a small tributary of the swat. It was mainly of importance as affording a route to the Danish Kol, For the valley was narrowed and rugged and inhabited by two unimportant clans—the Isa Khel and Burhan Khel. It contained, however, a good stream of running water.

== Dealings with Mohmands subsequent to the expedition of 1897 ==
For some years after the severe punishment meted out to them in 1897, the Mohmands remained quiet and British dealings with the tribe till the year 1902 were of no importance.

In that year, another section was added to those already in receipt of allowances. By the terms of the Durand Agreement of 1893 the control of the Mitai valley had been allotted to the Indian Government. Prior to this treaty the Musa Khel Baezai, who inhabit the valley, had been in receipt of an allowance from the Amir. This had naturally been withheld since the transfer of territory had taken place, and the Musa Khel maliks now petitioned the Indian Government for a grant in lieu of that which they had formerly received from Kabul. The justice of their claim was evident and the Indian Government accordingly decided to accede to their request. At the same time, Musa Khel Baezai of the Mitai the Nawab of Nawagai was induced to relinquish his claim of suzerainty over the valley, which had previously formed part of the old Nawagai Khanate.

This event was quickly seized upon by the mullas, most prominent of whom At the time were the Sufi Sahib of Batikot and the Maulvi Sahib of Kama, as an opportunity to play on the fanatical feelings of the Mohmands.

All who were in receipt of allowances from, or had any dealings with the British were denounced as Kafirs and the preaching of these men had such effect on the Mitai Musa Khel, that they did not come in to Peshawar to claim the allowances so recently granted.

Their example was followed by the Dawezai, Utmanzai, and Pandiali Mohmands, and of all the "assured clans" the Halimzai and Tarakzai alone dared to come regularly to Peshawar to receive their allowances.

About this time also further ill-feeling was occasioned by the preparations for the construction of a railway through Shilman. The Baezai and Khwaizai especially began to show their hostility to the scheme, and threatened the villages of Smatzai and Shinpokh on the right bank of the river, because they remained friendly to the British and were willing to assist in the work.

In April 1903, a party of Afghan Mohmands, many of whom were khasadars, actually crossed the river, filled up some wells in the villages and succeeded in impeding irrigation, thereby doing much damage to the crops. The majority of the raiders appeared to have been Morcha Khel Baezai.

The Indian Government at once represented to the Amir the necessity for the demarcation of the frontier in this region, in order put an end to outrages of this kind. A Boundary Commission was asked for and to this the Amir gave his consent. Accordingly, a British commissioner was nominated, Major Roos-Keppel, C.I.E., Political Agent in the Khaibar, being the officer selected, and on 19 December 1903, the Amir was informed of the appointment and was further told that Major Roos-Keppel would be ready to meet the Afghan commissioner at the Nawa Kotal on 1 February.

Meanwhile, the Amir expressed a wish for the delimitation of the entire stretch of frontier from the Nawa Kotal to Paiwar Kotal. He also showed that he intended to put forward again his father's claim to the whole of the Bohai Dag, without making any corresponding concessions in the Kabul river region.

It soon became evident, however, from his continued failure to appoint a commissioner, and from the way in which he persistently delayed matters by verbal quibbles, that what he really desired was the indefinite postponement of any demarcation whatever.

Accordingly, as by 1 April 1904, he had nominated no Afghan official to meet Major Roos-Keppel, who had now been waiting for two whole months with all necessary transport in readiness, he was informed that owing to the lateness of the season the matter would have to be deferred till the following autumn.

Till May 1905 nothing further happened, but in that month, a second outrage was committed at Smatzai.

The Sarhang of Dakka, Muhammad Husain Khan, demanded the return of some wood which had floated down to Smatzai from the boat-bridge at Lalpura, recently broken in a flood. The villagers refused, saying that without an order from the Political Agent in the Khaibar they would not give up what they considered theirs by ancient custom. Thereupon the Sarhang, incensed at the obstinacy of the villagers, decided to seize the wood by a display of force sufficient in his estimation to overawe the villagers, though without apparently desiring that any armed collision should occur. With this object in view, he despatched 120 khasadars from Kam Dakka to Smatzai, followed by 180 more from Lalpura.

A third and smaller party of khasadars, mostly Morcha Khel Baezai, though ostensibly acting against the Sarhang's orders, crossed the river on rafts and made a sudden and unexpected attack on the village, opening fire at close range. During the diversion thus caused the larger party of khasadars floated off the wood.

On receipt of news of this incident, the Indian Government protested to the Amir against the conduct of Muhammad Husain Khan, the viceroy suggesting that this disturber of the peace should be removed from his post of Sarhang of Dakka.

The Amir emphatically declined to call the Sarhang to account, and even forwarded and endorsed a decidedly impertinent letter from Muhammad Husain Khan laying claim to Smatzai as Afghan territory.

The Indian Government then sent a further communication, in which it was pointed out that the demarcation of the boundary in that part of the frontier was a matter of urgent necessity, and that consequently the Indian Government were prepared to arrange for a Boundary Commission to take place in the autumn. At the same time, the Amir was informed that his claim to Smatzai could not possibly be entertained. Nothing, however, came of this renewed proposal.

Throughout this period of unrest, the Tarakzai clan remained steadfastly loyal to Government, and even made it clear that they were quite prepared to defend the Shilman railway throughout its length within their own clan boundaries.

Accordingly, in December 1905, an agreement was entered into with them, by which in consideration of an additional allowance of Rs. 5,000 per annum, the tribe undertook full responsibility for the protection of the railway and all works concerned, also of the river itself if used for transport, etc., from Warsak up to the extreme limit of Tarakzai territory.

The Halimzai agreed to assist the Tarakzai in performing this duty and also undertook the same responsibility as the Tarakzai, with regard to any portion of the railway which might at any future date be carried through their limits.

In spite, however, of the attitude of the Tarakzai and Halimzai, disaffection continued to increase, and the Utman Khel of Ambahar were also infected. In 1906 a series of raids into the Peshawar district about Shabkadar commenced, the moving spirits being the Koda Khel Baezai, under Mahasil, and the Ambahar Utman Khel under Mir Baz, of Gumbatai, and Hakim Khan.

The first serious violation of British territory took place on 21 March 1906, when a gang consisting mainly of Afghan Mohmands, assisted by outlaws from Hazarnao in Ningrahar, raided the village of Jogini, near Michni. In this raid, some Tarakzai were also implicated, but the maliks of the clan acted fully up to their responsibility and handed over the offenders to the civil authorities in Peshawar for trial. A second and more serious raid occurred on 9 April. The village of Tangi, near Abazai, was attacked, four British subjects killed, the chief constable wounded and property valued at Rs. 30,000 carried off by the gang, which appears on this occasion to have been composed mainly of Koda Khel Baezai and Ambahar Utman Khel.

The success of these raids caused a considerable panic amongst the large Hindu population of Shankargarh and its neighbourhood and a rumour gained currency among them that a hostile lashkar was gathering across the border.

To allay their anxiety, and to prevent any further violation of British territory, a Squadron Guides Cavalry and a Squadron 21st Cavalry F. F. were sent to the Forts at Abazai and Shankargarh, respectively.

The cavalry on their arrival soon discovered that the Tangi affair had been nothing more than an ordinary frontier raid and that there was no truth in the rumour of a hostile gathering. Accordingly, as there seemed to be no necessity to keep the cavalry there, they were withdrawn, but from that time it has been considered advisable to garrison Shankargarh and Abazai with small detachments of regular troops.

The result of these measures was that throughout the remainder of 1906 and the whole of 1907, only one small raid on the village of Hasanzai near Shabkadar was committed.

Stopped in one direction, the Mohmands still found it possible to give vent to their hostile, feelings in tire Kabul river region. In January 1907 Captain Lubbock, R.E., in charge of the construction of the Shilman railway, was fired upon while moving down the river in a boat. Later, in November of the same year, on the arrival near Smatzai of a survey party to decide on the merits of the two alternative routes for the railway, through Loe Shilman valley or along the Kabul river to Smatzai, a party of some 200 Koda Khel Baezai and Khwaizai collected on the left bank of the river.

The camp of Mr. Johns, conducting the survey, was fired on at Bar Ugda, and the villages of Smatzai and Shinpokh were subjected to constant sniping from the left bank of the river. This small lashkar took up a sangared position along the left bank, as far down as Palosi, thus effectually preventing any detailed examination of the right bank in that direction. Mr. Johns succeeded, however, in effecting all that he considered necessary, and on 1 December the party withdrew.

On their departure, the lashkar returned to their homes. During the period in which they had been in position on the bank of the river these Mohmands had been supplied with provisions by the Hakim of Lalpura, who for a long time past had been very hostile to the British. The new Sarhang of Dakka, however, acting contrary to the procedure of his father Muhammad Husain Khan, who had died in February 1907, seems to have been averse to the whole affair.

== Behaviour of the Mohmands during and subsequent to the Bazar Valley Expedition ==
In 1906 and 1907 many raids were made into the Peshawar and Kohat districts by the Zakka Khel Afridis. During the first few weeks of 1908, the situation became so serious that Government sanctioned a punitive expedition into the Bazar valley - the principal winter home of the Zakka Khel.

On the advance of this force into Bazar in February, several fanatical mullas attempted to raise help for the Zakka Khel, and signs of unrest were apparent among most of the tribes living north of the Kabul river, more especially amongst the Mohmands, the majority of whom were already in a state of discontent through the construction of the Shilman railway.

When some emissaries from the Zakka Khel actually made their appearance in the Mohmand country they found many of the young bloods willing to assist them, and a small lashkar quickly collected under the fanatical Gud Mulla of Inzari. By this time, however, the resistance of the Zakka Khel was weakening, and before the Mohmand lashkar had decided whether to move into Bazar itself, or create a diversion by an attack on Shankargarh, the Zakka Khel accepted the terms imposed on them.

There was, therefore, no further opportunity for the Mohmands to effect anything on their behalf and the majority of the lashkar returned to their homes, having accomplished nothing but a paltry raid on the village of Batagram near Shankargarh, on 3 March.

Immediately on receipt of news of this rising amongst the Mohmands, in which the strength of the lashkar was much exaggerated, two Squadrons 21st Cavalry were ordered to proceed from Nowshera Cavalry Cantonment to the Mohmand border. They reached Shabkadar on 4 March, a few days before the dispersal of the lashkar, but as shortly after their arrival, the crisis seemed to have passed away they were soon withdrawn.

In reality, however, trouble was by no means at an end. When the majority of the gathering had gone to their homes, a few wild spirits, disappointed of fighting and unwilling to return to their villages without having accomplished anything, had hung together under the leadership of Mahasil, Mir Baz and Hakim Khan. This gang took the departure of the cavalry as the signal for the commencement of a series of raids into the Doaba, i.e., the tract of land lying between the Swat and Kabul rivers.

Three times in quick succession they plundered the Hindu shops of villages near Shabkadar. The first violation of British territory occurred on 24 March, when Marozai, a village six miles north-east of Shankargarh, was attacked, two Hindus killed and a large quantity of property carried off.

One day later the village of Mirzadher, two miles from Marozai, suffered the same fate, and this time a bania was carried off. This dacoity was not, however, an unqualified success, for on their return journey the gang were unexpectedly attacked by an Isa Khel Malik, Ghulam Khan of Dag, who has always been friendly to the Government. A fight ensued in which the raiders were worsted and had to make a hurried retreat, leaving one of their number, a Koda Khel, and the Hindu in the hands of Ghulam Khan, who sent them in to the deputy commissioner a few days later under an escort. This check did not stop the raiding, however, for on 30 March, less than a week later, the gang carried out their third serious outrage. The Hindu shops in Chikkar, a village 9 miles (14 km) southeast of Shabkadar, were robbed, and the raiders made good their escape with the booty.

These rapid and successful movements naturally caused a panic amongst the Hindus of the district, who were invariably selected as the victims. Accordingly, the regular garrisons of the posts at Shabkadar and Abazai were strengthened, with a view to setting free the Border Military Police for patrolling. By 1 April the troops on the border had been reinforced and were disposed as follows:

Garrison location	Cavalry	Infantry
Shabkadar	30	150
Matta Mughal Khel	120	150
Abazai	30	150

The police were also strengthened by the despatch of 100 Border Military Police and 40 District Police from Peshawar, and the command of the entire force, which was further reinforced on the 4th by 80 Scouts Royal Warwickshire Regiment, was given to Lieutenant-Colonel Y. B. Fane, 21st Cavalry F. F.

When the increase of troops became known to the tribesmen across the border an expedition seemed to them the object in view. The Koda Khel and Ambahar Utman Khel, who had furnished the majority of the raiders, at once sounded their neighbours for help should a British force enter their territories. Mahasil, the Koda Khel leader, first appealed to the Musa Khel of Mitai, but owing to the influence of Ghairat Khan, a malik friendly to Government, he received only very lukewarm promises of support. Mir Baz, Utman Khel, had meanwhile been trying to raise a lashkar in Ambahar and the surrounding country, with which to attack Ghulam Khan for his action after the Mirzadher raid.

In this, he had met with little success, and both he and Mahasil made a further appeal, this time to the Afghan mullas. Their success on this occasion was immediate. The two notorious mullas, the Sufi Sahib of Batikot and the Hazrat Sahib of Butkhak, both championed their cause, and raised the cry "jihad" in Ningrahar, at the same time proclaiming Ghulam Khan an infidel. Tribesmen began at once to flock to their standards and in a few days a regular stream of men, amongst whom were many Afghan khasadars, began to pour into the Bohai Dag and Kamali from Afghan territory.

On 12 April the Hazrat Sahib himself arrived in Koda Khel and the Sufi Sahib's son appeared to represent his father, who was ill. Here they were joined by the famous Shakar of Hazarnao with a considerable following, while Mahasil, who had been on the point of paying the fine imposed on the Koda Khel for their share in the recent raids, again plucked up courage and joined the rapidly increasing lashkar.

By 17 April the gathering had assumed such large proportions that a reinforcement of one squadron cavalry, 2 guns, and 550 infantry was sent out to Lieutenant-Colonel Fane, and General Sir James Willcocks himself left Peshawar to arrange the disposal of the force. The fort at Michni was taken over by a garrison of 50 cavalry and 100 infantry from the Border Military Police, and a post was established at Garhi Sadar, between Matta and Abazai.

Meanwhile, the lashkar had commenced to move in the direction of British territory, and on the 17th was in the Kandahari valley. On the 18th the main body was in Kamali, and here the Hazrat Sahib announced his intention to destroy Ghulam Khan's village on the following day.

On 19 April their advance was continued by two routes, one column, to which was assigned the destruction of Dag, moving down the Pandiali valley, and the other, under the Hazrat Sahib, by the Gandao valley. As previously arranged, the Pandiali column, with which were the Gud Mulla, Shakar, Mahasil, and Mir Baz, burnt Dag on the 19th, and then marched to the foot of the Burjina Pass, where they bivouacked for the night.

On the gathering of the lashkar Ghulam Khan had tried to win over the Isa Khel and Burhan Khel to his cause, but these two clans refused to assist him against such enormous odds. He then sent his brother to ask for the assistance of troops, but it was considered impolitic to help him, and he accordingly decided on flight. He delayed rather long, however, and it was only with difficulty that he escaped at the last moment with his family to Abazai. Here, he was offered a portion of the fort for the accommodation of his family and followers, but owing to some disagreement about the necessary space he decided to stay in a village close by.

In the evening of the same day a patrol within the British border, west of Matta, was fired on by the advanced guard of the Pandiali Column, and later a desultory long-range fire was opened on the post at Matta. News was then received that an attack on Garhi Sadar during the night was contemplated. As the garrisons in both Garhi Sadar and Matta were weak, Lieutenant-Colonel Fane decided to withdraw the troops in Garhi Sadar to Matta, and orders were issued to that effect, but owing to various causes the movement could not be immediately carried out, and darkness came on while the party were still on the way. When about one mile from Matta a hot fire was opened on them from both sides of the road, and they had to fight the remainder of the way in, suffering the following casualties:

Unit	Casualties
1st Royal Warwickshire Regiment	1 Private killed
28th Punjabis	1 Sepoy wounded
19th Lancers	1 Syce wounded

After the arrival of the party at Matta the enemy drew off, and contented themselves with firing a few shots during the remainder of the night into Matta Camp.

== Events during the latter part of April 1908 ==
The daring incursion into British territory and the attack on British troops, mentioned in the last chapter, clearly showed that the Mohmands were not content with the destruction of Ghulam Khan's village, but were spoiling for a fight. The situation was decidedly serious as the troops then on the frontier were totally inadequate to prevent so large a lashkar from raiding the villages within the British border. Moreover, Lieutenant Colonel Fane's command consisted of a collection of small detachments from different corps, and consequently lacked the strength of a force, equal in number, but composed of complete units.

Sir James Willcocks, therefore, decided to send out reinforcements and gave orders for a force composed of 2 guns and 1,300 infantry under Brigadier-General Anderson to move out on 20 April. There was great delay in starting, however, and it was not till 10-40 a.m. that the advance guard left Peshawar; consequently the troops had to carry out the long march of 18 miles (29 kilometres) to Shabkadar under a burning sun, and suffered considerably.

In the meanwhile orders were issued for the move of a force composed of 8 guns and 1,300 infantry to Peshawar from Nowshera, and for the 21st Cavalry to march direct from Nowshera Cavalry Cantonment to Shabkadar, via Charsada. Fortunately, while these moves were being carried out the Mohmands, who were also awaiting reinforcements, remained comparatively inactive. With the exception of some firing at Matta on the night of 20 April, nothing further occurred till 8 a.m. on the 21st, when a party of Mohmands opened fire on a cavalry standing patrol, 800 yards west of Matta. This patrol had been ordered to avoid a collision if possible, and accordingly withdrew, but General Willcocks who was in Matta at the time ordered the Field guns to disperse the enemy. Three shells were fired, which had the desired effect, and no further aggressive movements took place during the day.

On his arrival the previous evening Brigadier-General Anderson had taken over the command of all the troops on the border from Lieutenant-Colonel Fane; he now moved his Headquarters, together with certain of the troops which he had brought out from Peshawar, to Matta, while Sir James Willcocks left Matta to return to Peshawar.

Whilst en route to Peshawar, General Willcocks interviewed a number of Halimzai maliks, who had come into Shakkadar. These maliks stated that the Hazrat Sahib and the Sufi Sahib's son were at Ghalanai in the Gandao Valley, and that they themselves had been summoned by the Hazrat Sahib to a general jirga of all the Mohmand clans. They asked permission to attend this jirga, and at the same time declared that without active support they would be unable to prevent many of their own men from joining the lashkar, much less check its advance. General Willcocks advised them to attend the jirga, and inform the Hazrat Sahib that no invasion of Mohmand territory was at present contemplated, but that any attack on a British post would meet with immediate reprisals. On their way, these maliks were met and turned back by the advanced party of the lashkar, composed of some 800 to 1,000 Baezai, who had already reached Shahbaz Kor, a village about 4.5 miles from Shabkadar.

On their return, they reported that the Hazrat Sahib was considering terms, which he would announce to Government. These were supposed to include such impossible clauses as:

- the evacuation of the Malakand
- the surrender of Ghulam Khan and the outlaw who had been given up by him
- the immediate dispersal of the troops

and others equally ridiculous, but they never took shape.

Reports were also received that Mir Sahib Jan.Badshah, a well-known mulla of Islampur in Kunar, had joined the enemy assembled at the foot of the Burjina Pass.

In the course of the day General Willcocks received instructions from Army Headquarters at Simla, in which he was informed as to the composition of the force to be used for offensive operations against the Mohmands, should such a course be decided on by the British Government:

- 1st Brigade
  - 1st Northumberland Fusiliers
  - 53rd Sikhs F. F.
  - 57th Rifles F. F.
  - 59th Rifles F. F.
  - Sections A and B, No. 1 British Field Hospital.
  - No. 101 Native Field Hospital.
- 2nd Brigade
  - 1st Seaforth Highlanders
  - Guides Infantry
  - 2nd Punjabis
  - 55th Rifles F. F.
  - Sections C and D, No. 1 British Field Hospital.
  - No. 102 Native Field Hospital.
- 3rd (Reserve) Brigade.
  - 1st Royal Munster Fusiliers
  - 21st Punjabis
  - 22nd Punjabis
  - 40th Pathans
  - Sections A and B, No. 7 British Field Hospital.
  - No. 112 Native Field Hospital.
  - Sections A and B, No. 113 Native Field Hospital.
- Divisional troops
  - 21st Cavalry F. F.
  - No. 8 Mountain Battery, R. G. A.
  - 23rd Mountain Battery
  - 28th Mountain Battery
  - No. 1 Company, 1st Sappers and Miners
  - No. 6 Company, 1st Sappers and Miners
  - 31st Pioneers
  - No. 103 Native Field Hospital

He was also directed to modify as far as possible, the disposition of troops on the border, with a view to facilitating the concentration of the selected force, whilst maintaining a sufficient garrison at Peshawar and complete units for the Malakand Moveable Column.

Shortly after dark on the same day the enemy cut the telephone wire between Shabkadar and Matta, carrying off some 400 yards of wire, and later on small parties fired into the posts at. Shabkadar and Matta, but without effect.

The following morning signs of great activity amongst the enemy were apparent, and bodies of men, varying from 30 to 60 in number, were visible making sangars on the line of foothills, guarding the entrances to the Gandao and Pandiali valleys. Whilst the majority were thus employed, other small parties kept up an intermittent long-range fire all day on Matta itself, wounding a haviklar 53rd Sikhs during the afternoon.

In the evening a patrol of Border Military Police moving from Shabkadar to Matta was attacked on the road, and suffered one or two casualties, and it was not till a party of 50 sabres 21st Cavalry were sent out from Matta to their assistance that the enemy drew off. Some moves took place during the day, and the post at Garhi Sadar, which had been evacuated on 19 April, was re-established with Colonel Carruthers, 59th Scinde Rifles, in command. The garrison was furnished from Matta, and troops were moved from Shabkadar to replace these, whilst their place was in turn taken by fresh arrivals from Peshawar. At 11 p.m. the same night the posts at Matta and Garhi Sadar were simultaneously attacked—Matta from the north-east and Garhi Sadar from the south-west. The enemy appear to have moved down from the foothills at dark to the Matta—Garhi Sadar road at some point between the two posts. From this place they formed three separate parties, two of which simultaneously opened fire on Matta and Garhi Sadar, thereby covering the third party, which passed through the line of posts and raided the large village of Katozai about 1 mile east of Garhi Sadar. Their object seems mainly to have been the collection of foodstuffs, as the lashkar was badly in need of provisions.

The attack on Garhi Sadar, though only resulting in the death of one of the garrison, was of a most determined character. At Matta the enemy were very few in number and did little firing, but the answering fire from the perimeter was exceedingly heavy. The noise had the effect of causing a stampede amongst the cavalry horses and transport animals, which owing to the sandy soil had no difficulty in pulling out their picketing pegs. Several of the horses leaped the perimeter and forced their way through the barbed wire, on which many of them were terribly lacerated. Outside the camp they broke up into two groups, one of which made for the foothills held by the enemy, who, mistaking them for a cavalry charge, opened a heavy fire on them; the other dashed through the enemy who were attacking Garhi Sadar, scattering them in all directions, and forced their way through the wire entanglement into the camp, some even rushing wildly through the camp and out at the other side. The loss amongst the horses in this stampede was severe; some were shot by the enemy, others lost, and several so badly injured by the wire that they had to be shot. A few men were hurt by the stampede, but no casualties occurred from the enemy's fire.

Casualties amongst horses on night of 22 to 23 April
Cause of Death	19th Lancers	21st Cavalry
Killed by bullets	8	4
Wounded by bullets	6	0
Injured by wire	8	2
Missing (up to 7 pm 23rd)	24	6
Total	46	12

These were not the only attacks, however, for shortly after the affair at Matta shots were fired into the camp at Shabkadar, and here also the enemy succeeded in drawing British fire.

Another party even penetrated into British territory as far as the bridge over the branch of the Kabul river at Hajizai, and attacked the police post there, wounding one sowar of the Border Military Police.

The general demeanour of the enemy was now bolder owing to British inaction, and on the 23rd they showed standards at various points on the foothills. They still continued to fire at all patrols near Matta, and in the afternoon a large number were observed moving in the direction of Garhi Sadar with standards. These men quickly dispersed, however, when a few shells were fired at them by the field guns in Matta. Altogether they seemed more inclined to risk a fight, and in fact, rumours were afloat that the Hazrat Sahib intended to make a general attack on the whole British line on Friday, 24 April.

As further inaction in face of such a fanatical gathering would have in all probability led to very serious trouble along the entire frontier—reports of unrest in Bajaur and attempts to raise rebellion in Upper Swat had already come to hand—General Willcocks decided to forestall any move by the Hazrat Sahib and attack the enemy in position on the following day.

With this intention he issued verbal orders for all the available troops to make a simultaneous attack in two columns, shortly after dawn on 24 April.

Brigadier-General Anderson, to whom the command of the right column was assigned, was directed to concentrate at Matta the garrisons of Abazai, Garhi Sadar, and Matta, and attack the enemy's left flank, which lay on the foothills covering the Burjina Pass. The left column under Colonel Unwin, 21st Cavalry, received orders to move out of Shabkadar at dawn in the direction of Shahbaz Kor, and carry out a reconnaissance in force of the enemy's right flank, which covered the entrance to the Gandao valley.

During the night the Mohmands were very active and the posts at Shabkadar, Matta, and Garhi Sadar were again fired into, the last-named being vigorously attacked, but only one casualty occurred, one sepoy, 57th Rifles, being killed. Besides these attacks the villages of Batagram, Surikh, Katozai, and three other smaller villages were raided.

In accordance with the orders received from General Willcocks on the previous day, the two columns moved out to the attack shortly after dawn on 24 April.

The left column, under Colonel Unwin, operating from Shabkadar, advanced to within 2,000 yards of Shahbaz Kor, with the cavalry forming the advanced guard, covered by the fire of the 18th Battery, RFA. Owing to the weakness of the force, however, General Willcocks had given instructions that an advance into the hills should on no account be made.

Therefore, as the enemy's numbers had been ascertained and the limit of the low foothills had been almost reached, Colonel Unwin gave orders for the retirement to commence about 11:30 a.m. During this movement, which was first covered by the cavalry and later by the Seaforth Highlanders, Lieutenant Gray and one private, both of the Seaforth Highlanders, were severely wounded. This reconnaissance in force, though it could not be pressed home as an attack, was nevertheless of great service to the stronger Column operating from Matta against the enemy's left flank, as it effectually prevented the enemy from moving up reinforcements from Shahbaz Kor to meet General Anderson's attack.

Simultaneously with the action of the column from Shabkadar, the troops from Matta, Garhi Sadar, and Abazai attacked the enemy in front of Matta. At 6-30 a.m. the force commenced to assemble on the road half-way between Matta and Garhi Sadar. During this movement, the guns were concealed by the cavalry marching in half sections on their outer flank. By 7 a.m. the concentration was complete and Brigadier-General Anderson gave orders for the advance to commence, placing Colonel Biddulph, 19th Lancers, in command of the cavalry, and Lieutenant Scinde Rifles, in command of the infantry.

At this time the enemy, at least 4,000 strong, were holding the line of sangars, which they had prepared and held, though not in such great numbers, during the two previous days. This line covered a front of about 1.5 miles and blocked the road to the Burjina Pass down which reinforcements could be seen approaching.

The first line in the advance which now commenced was composed of the 1st Northumberland Fusiliers, 1st Royal Warwickshire Regiment, and the 59th Scinde Rifles. Of these the Warwickshires received special orders to capture the dominating feature of the enemy's position, a large hill on the right centre of their line. The advance was supported by the guns, and the 53rd Sikhs and 57th Rifles, as a general reserve, were ordered to keep in advance of but close to the guns, conforming to their movements. The two squadrons cavalry, with the exception of small patrols on the flanks for observation, were kept in hand throughout the fight. The action soon became general along the line and at 9 a.m. Brigadier-General Anderson advanced the guns 1,000 yards nearer to the enemy, in order to support the attack of the Warwickshire Regiment on the principal objective. Ten minutes later the Warwickshires, with a few scouts of the Northumberland Fusiliers, carried this point in fine style, and inflicted severe loss from it on a party of the enemy retiring through a narrow gorge.

The capture of this hill enabled the advance of the centre and right of the line to be pushed home against the sangars on the lower foothills in front of the Burjina. Pass road. As the fighting during this stage of the advance was severe, Brigadier-General Anderson ordered the 57th Rifles to move up in support of the 59th Rifles and at 9:30 a.m. the guns—covered by the 53rd Sikhs—were still further advanced to a position some 800 yards nearer the enemy. The effect of this was at once apparent, for the enemy's centre and right sangars were quickly carried by the Northumberland Fusiliers, 57th Rifles and 59th Rifles, though not without many casualties; on the right especially there was much close fighting, one of the enemy's sangars on this flank being carried by the 57th Rifles and 59th Rifles at the point of the bayonet. As the force under Brigadier-General Anderson was obviously too weak, especially in guns, to advance into the high hills, orders had been issued that no advance should be made beyond certain definite points. These points had now been reached, and all efforts were accordingly turned to inflicting severe punishment on the retreating enemy by heavy fire; and with good effect, for the enemy's losses during the day were later reported to have been as heavy as 800 killed and wounded. By 10:20 a.m. the majority of the enemy had retired to the higher hills over which the track to the Burjina Pass runs, and as they had evidently had a severe lesson Brigadier-General Anderson decided to break off the action.

The withdrawal was steadily carried out in spite of the fire of small bodies of the enemy who, adopting the usual Pathan tactics, followed up the force in its retirement to the plain. All efforts to draw them on, however, insufficient numbers for the massed cavalry to charge proved unavailing. Some detached parties of the enemy made an attempt to get around the right flank but were held off by the cavalry.

By 12 noon the whole force had reached the Matta–Garhi Sadar road, with the cavalry out in the plain between the road and the hills to observe any move the enemy might make. The various detachments which had composed the force then returned to the posts from which they had been drawn; the 53rd Sikhs to A baza, 57th Rifles to Garhi Sadar. and the remainder to Matta.

The casualties, which were heavy for the size of the force engaged, were as follows:

	Killed	Wounded
British	2 Privates, Northumberland Fusiliers	3 officers and 16 rank and file
Native	4 rank and file	1 officer and 30 rank and file

During the morning the Guides Infantry reached Shabkadar by a forced march from Mardan; it was too late, however, to be utilized for the fighting.

This march deserves a somewhat detailed description. At 4 p.m. on 23 April a telegram was received in Mardan ordering the Guides Infantry to proceed as strong as possible with Field Service scale of ammunition and kits on lightest possible scale to Shabkadar, where their services were urgently needed.

The regiment (9 British Officers, 9 Native Officers and 488 rank and file, under Colonel G. J. Younghusband, C.B.) marched at 6:30 p.m., having had to await the arrival of their camels, which were out grazing, and soon after midnight passed through Charsada (18 miles). On arriving at the bank of the Khiali branch of the Swat River at 2:15 a.m. on the 24th, it was found that the bridge-of-boats had been carried away by floods and that a ferry of two boats was plying in its place. The regiment was employed till 6 a.m. in getting the 1st Line transport, Maxim gun mules and horses across, and the march was resumed at 6:15 a.m., one British Officer being left behind with two companies to get the camels across and bring them on to Shabkadar. The regiment arrived at Shabkadar at 11 a.m., having accomplished the march of 35 miles from Mardan in 16.5 hours, of which 4 hours were occupied in ferrying across the Khiali River. No men fell out during the march.

The firing ceased immediately after the arrival of the regiment at Shabkadar, and the remainder of the day was spent in entrenching.

After these two actions the enemy, who had evidently had enough of it, retired up the Gandao and Pandiali valleys, and no attack was made on any post that night; and on the following day, when all the available troops were again sent out in two columns to attack the enemy, none were seen in the mouth of the Gandao valley and only a small piquet of six men in the Burjina Pass.

On 26 April, orders were received constituting the Mohmand Field Force, as previously detailed, Field Force with retrospective effect from 24 April inclusive, and nominating General Sir James Willcocks to command, with supreme military and political control of the operations.

== Incursion of the Sufi Sahib's Lashkar into the Khaibar, and measures taken to repel the same ==
For some days after the action of 24 April there was a lull in the operations. Reconnaissances were made up the mouths of the Gandao and Pandiali valleys, but these disclosed no signs of the enemy, and it was evident, both from this and from information brought to the Political officers, that the enemy had completely dispersed from the neighbourhood of British territory.

During this period the redistribution of troops necessary for the concentration of the Mohmand Field Force was actively carried out. By the end of the month, the three Brigades were nearly complete, and on 30 April Major-General A. A. Barrett, C.B., in command of the 2nd Brigade, arrived and moved his headquarters to Jangli Burj, a village about half-way between Shabkadar and Matta, where a flying column under Colonel Younghusband of the Guides had been established.

The force was almost ready for an advance directly orders should be received, when a sudden diversion in the direction of the Khaibar made the immediate punishment of the Mohmands of secondary importance for the moment.

The Sufi Sahib, who had been prevented by illness, and bv his jealousy of the Hazrat Sahib, from joining the Mohmand lashkar, had succeeded in raising a second Ioshkar in Ningrahar and. the neighbouring districts of Afghanistan. This force, which was composed almost entirely of Afghan subjects, now advanced to the head of the Khaibar valley and threatened Landi Kotal.

Colonel Roos-Keppel, C.I.E., Political Agent in the Khaibar, wired on 1 May that the enemy had crossed the border in considerable numbers, and that the Sufi Sahib's emissaries were attempting to bring about a general rising among the Loargai Shinwaris and in Tirah.

This message was followed on 2 May by a request for regular troops to be sent as far as Jamrud. This was received by General Willcocks at 9 a.m. on 2 May, and he at once issued orders for the following moves to take place:

- The Reserve Brigade, with 4 guns, 80th Battery R. F. A., 28th Mountain Battery, and 1 Squadron, 19th Lancers, under Brigadier-General Ramsay, C.B., from Peshawar to Jamrud.
- Two guns, 18th Battery, R.F.A., from Shabkadar, and 23rd Mountain Battery, Seaforth Highlanders and Guides Infantry from Jangli Burj, under Major-General Barrett, C.B., to Peshawar, en route for the Khaibar.
- The 54tli Sikhs by rail from Nowshera to Peshawar.

In order to keep the troops fresh and ready to continue their march on the following day, transport carts were provided for the conveyance of the British troops, as they naturally suffered considerably from the great heat then prevailing.

General Willcocks himself moved via Peshawar to Jamrud, where on his arrival at 6 p.m. he found Brigadier-General Ramsay with the 3rd Brigade, less the 22nd Punjabis and 2 guns, 28th Mountain Battery, which had marched straight through to Ali Masjid.

The situation at this time appeared so serious that orders were issued from Army Headquarters for the mobilization of two additional brigades, designated the 4th and 5th Brigades.

The enemy, who were now estimated at from 13,000 to 20,000 strong, were reported to be advancing and the Political Agent wired that he expected an attack that night. The Sufi Sahib himself was reported at this time to be at Khwar at the head of the Bazar Valley with 8,000 men. During the night the fort and sarai at Landi Kotal were fired into, but the enemy put all their energy into an attack on an almost impregnable stone blockhouse at Michni Kandao. The vigour of their assault may be estimated from the fact that scaling - ladders were actually planted against the walls, one of which was captured by the garrison. The attack was easily beaten off by the Khaibar Rifles, who succeeded in inflicting some loss on the enemy, while only one of the garrison was wounded.

At Jamrud a few shots were fired into the camp the same night from a village close by, wounding a non-commissioned officer and a private, both of the Royal Munster Fusiliers, but this was evidently the work of local badmashes.

The next morning the troops under Brigadier-General Ramsay pushed on to Landi Kotal, Major-General Barrett's force reached Ali Masjid, and the 54th Sikhs arrived at Jamrud from Nowshera by rail.

General Willcocks left Jamrud and, pushing on with the cavalry after passing Ali Masjid, reached Landi Kotal at 2 p.m. Here he found that the enemy were still keeping up a desultory fire on the blockhouses west of Landi Kotal, and he decided to attack them on the following morning.

These prompt measures on the British part, and their own failure to cause an Afridi rising, disheartened the enemy, and the majority left during the night, only a few shots being fired at Landi Kotal after dark.

Next morning, 4 April, in accordance with orders issued over-night, the troops moved out of Landi Kotal at 7 a.m. to attack the enemy in position in and around Bagh and Khargali villages.

Two columns were formed; the right column under Colonel Roos' Keppel receiving instructions to operate towards Landi Khana, in order to cut off the enemy's retreat in the direction of Tor Kham and at the same time guard the right flank of the left column under Brigadier-General Ramsay, which was to make a frontal attack.

As the troops advanced, however, it was soon evident that with the exception of some 20 men, who kept up a long-range fire, retreating as the troops advanced, the enemy did not intend to fight, and in fact that the majority had already fled. The advance continued as far as a ridge beyond East Khargali village. Here some loss was inflicted on the enemy by rifle fire, and by the guns which fired several rounds at small parties of the enemy escaping over the Shamsha and Made Kandao (The field-guns had come into action on the northern Landi Kotal-Landi Khana road below Michni Kandao blockhouse).

By this time it was clear that there was no chance of cutting off the few enemy who remained and the withdrawal to camp was commenced at about 11 a.m. This retirement was not molested by the enemy to any appreciable extent as only a few men followed up cautiously, firing at about 1,000 yards range. The casualties during the day were few: Lieutenant Campbell and one Sepoy, 40th Pathans, were wounded in the advance, and one private, Royal Munster Fusiliers, was wounded by British friendly fire during the retirement. The enemy's losses were reported as 72 killed and wounded, and most of these are said to have occurred as they retired by the Made and Shamsha Kandao.

During the greater part of the forenoon the weather was very unsettled, heavy showers alternating with a cold wind, and at times thick mist totally obscured the enemy's position.

By next morning no enemy were in the vicinity, and as all danger seemed to be past the troops commenced to retire from the Khaibar on 7 May. On 6 May an Afridi band successfully raided the camels of the 50th Camel Corps at Ali Masjid. The gang, who were led by the notorious Zakka Khel raider Multan, drove off some eight camels which were grazing outside the piquet line.

A party composed of one company, Guides Infantry, one company, Khaibar Rifles, and 24 sowars, 19th Lancers, at once set out in pursuit. Major Coape-Smith, 11th Lancers, commanding the 50th Camel Corps, accompanied the cavalry, who actually saw the camels being driven off in the direction of Chora. As it was by this time getting dark—the raid took place in the evening—the party decided to relinquish the pursuit and commenced the return journey to camp. When about 2 miles from Ali Masjid the cavalry were ambushed, Major Coape-Smith mortally wounded, and three horses and a rifle lost in the confusion. Two of these horses were recovered, however, on the following day by two companies of the 22nd Punjabis.

The return of the troops from the Khaibar was spread over three days. On 7 May the 2nd Brigade moved to Jamrud and the 3rd Brigade, leaving one section 28th Mountain Battery at Landi Kotal, halted at Ali Masjid. On 8 May the 2nd Brigade marched to Peshawar, and the 3rd Brigade reached Jamrud. On 9 May the movement was completed by the arrival of the 3rd Brigade at Peshawar.

About this time the cholera which had been prevalent for some time in the Peshawar district began to affect the troops on the Mohmand border. The fort at Shabkadar, which had for a long time now been much overcrowded, was highly unsanitary, and the troops were accordingly moved out into camp about h mile to the west of Shabkadar village on the Shabkadar-Michni road, only a small garrison being left in the fort. The troops in the Khaibar were also affected and on their return, it was found necessary to segregate the 21st Punjabis at Kacha Garhi and the Guides Infantry at Daudzai Tahsil.

== Advance of the Mohmand Field Force to Nahakki ==
On the return of the troops from the Khaibar to Peshawar sanction was granted, on 9 May, for an immediate advance into the Mohmand country. Before, however, this advance could commence, it was first necessary to concentrate the two brigades detailed for the expedition at the mouth of the Gandao valley, and also to hand over all the posts on the border and on the lines of communications to the 3rd (Reserve) brigade. With this object the troops from the Khaibar were moved forward, as follows, on 10 May:

- Major-General Barrett, with the 23rd Mountain Battery and Seaforth Highlanders, marched from Peshawar to Naguman. half-way between Peshawar and Shabkadar, where they were joined at 11 p.m. that night by the 54th Sikhs from Jamrud, who took the place of the Guides Infantry segregated for cholera at Daudzai.
- Brigadier-General Ramsay's Brigade to Naguman, where they encamped alongside the 2nd Brigade. The 21st Punjabis, amongst whom no fresh cases of cholera had occurred, rejoined this brigade at 7 a.m.

The following day the headquarters of the 3rd Brigade moved to a camp on the right bank of the Subhan Khwar, opposite the 1st Brigade camp on the Shabkadar-Michni road. The remainder of the brigade moved into some of the forts and posts on the line of communication. Throughout the day the 2nd Brigade remained halted at Naguman. In the afternoon General Willcocks held a conference, at which he explained to his brigade commanders the general plan for the operations about to commence.

On 12 May the concentration was completed; the 2nd Brigade advanced to Hafiz Kor on the border, where they were joined in the course of the day by the various units of the brigade which had not been moved to the Khaibar; the 3rd Brigade took over the remaining posts on the line of communication.

During the day a reconnaissance was carried out by three squadrons 21st Cavalry under Colonel Unwin, as far as Dand. No signs of the enemy were seen. Under cover of this reconnaissance the field telegraph wire was laid as far as Reg Mena, about half-way to Dand.

Cholera, which had appeared during the absence of the troops in the Khaibar, now suddenly became virulent. The 1st Northumberland Fusiliers were the first to be seriously affected and finally, on the advice of the Principal Medical Officer, it was decided to eliminate them from the 1st Brigade. The Royal Munster Fusiliers of the 3rd Brigade, who were at the time in camp on the right bank of the Subhan Khwar, were also attacked—four cases and five suspected cases occurring in this regiment in one day. The vacancy in the 1st Brigade was filled by the 22nd Punjabis from the 3rd Brigade, and to fill the gaps thus caused the 1st West Yorkshire Regiment and the 1–4th Gurkhas were hastily moved up from Nowshera. The latter regiment, however, succumbed almost immediately to the epidemic, and had to be replaced by the 19th Punjabis.

On 13 May, as all preparations were complete, the advance was commenced, and the 1st Brigade with attached troops as per margin, crossed the border and marched to Dand. As the Tarakzai, through whose territory the road lay, had remained friendly throughout, no opposition was expected, but as a precautionary measure the heights on either side of the road were piquetted by troops from the 2nd brigade, which remained at Hafiz Kor until the following day. As far as Hafiz Kor the road had been made passable for wheeled traffic during the three weeks which had elapsed since the action at Matta.

From this point up to within one mile of Dand but little difficulty was experienced with the transport; here, however, the track falls sharply into the bed of the Gandao stream and much time was spent before a sufficiently graded descent could be made over the slippery rock. On arrival in camp, large fatigue parties were sent out to improve the road to be covered on the following day in the direction of the Karappa Pass. These parties returned to camp at 6 p.m., after working up to within 3 miles of the pass itself.

During the evening news was received that a gathering of the enemy, which had been in the neighbourhood of the Khapak and Nahakki Passes, had dispersed and that consequently no organised opposition would probably be met with.

The camping ground at Dand was found far too small for so large a force, and the cavalry horses and transport animals were exceedingly cramped. Water, though plentiful from large pools in the Gandao stream, is brackish and decidedly indifferent in quality. Moreover, the camp is commanded on all sides, and a very large portion of the force was of necessity utilised for piquets.

At dawn on the following day a flying column strength as per margin, under Brigadier-General Anderson, pushed on as rapidly as possible to Nahakki, in order to forestall any attempt the enemy might make to cut the band of the water tank, which formed the main source of water supply at that place.

General Willcocks himself accompanied this column. At starting much difficulty was experienced in getting clear of camp owing to the narrow exit, and later further delay was caused by the bad state of the road near the Karappa Pass which had not been improved on the previous day. A halt was made for water near Durba. Khel in the territory of the Gandao Halimzai, — the highest point at which the Gandao stream appears above ground—and the march was then resumed to the Nahakki Pass, where the road was also found to be in an execrable state, showing practically no signs of the work done on it in 1897. The village at the foot of the pass showed signs of a hasty flight by the enemy, and a group of the enemy was seen on the high hill overlooking Nahakki from the east, but these were dispersed by a few shells. Shortly after the arrival of the column, a squadron which had been detached at Kasai in the Gandao to reconnoitre the Khapak Pass reached Nahakki, and reported the Khapak Pass to be held by the enemy.

Meanwhile, the remainder of the 1st Brigade, less the 54th Sikhs left at Dand, marched to Ghalanai in Gandao, and encamped close to the stream. The rear-guard of this force, delayed by the difficult exit from camp, did not get clear of Dand till 3:30 p.m., thereby keeping the 2nd Brigade, which had arrived from Hafiz Kor at 10 a.m., waiting 5 hours on the road. To avoid the overcrowding at Dand, which had occurred on the previous night, 2 squadrons 21st Cavalry, Guides Infantry and 55th Rifles, marched straight through, under Colonel Younghusband of the Guides, to Ghalanai, where they joined the troops of the 1st Brigade encamped at that place.

On 15 May the remainder of the 1st Brigade, together with the 2 squadrons 21st Cavalry attached to the 2nd Brigade, joined the flying column at Nahakki, leaving 4 Companies 34th Pioneers at Ghalanai to improve the road for the 2nd Brigade which moved up during the day to Ghalanai. Such delay occurred however in getting the camel transport of this brigade from Dand to the Karappa, in spite of the work of the Pioneers on the road, that it was midnight before the rear-guard got into camp at Ghalanai. During the day a second reconnaissance of the Khapak Pass, was carried out by one squadron 21st Cavalry.

Though information that the pass was held had previously been received, no enemy were seen till the leading men reached a point about 1,000 yards from the pass and commenced to dismount. A hot fire was then suddenly opened on them, and in a short time, three sowars and three horses were wounded, of which two of the latter had subsequently to be shot. The cavalry then retired, followed up for a short distance by the enemy. At the sound of the firing infantry were pushed up in support, but by this time the cavalry were out of danger. The enemy's numbers were estimated at from 500 to 1,000 men.

The same day Brigadier-General Anderson moved out of Nahakki, with force as per margin, and carried out a reconnaissance first to Lakai, thence to Haidar Kalai and back over the Darwazagai pass to camp at Nahakki. When the force debouched from the pass separating Kajau and Haidar Kalai, the cavalry turning to the right reconnoitred up the Kandahari plain for about 4 miles in the direction of Lakarai. Some fourteen villages were burnt during the day, but though large numbers of the enemy gathered in front of the cavalry, few attempted to follow up the retirement, most opposition being met with when retiring through the Darwazagai gorge. No casualties occurred during the day.

The field telegraph, which had been laid to Dand on the 13th and Ghalanai on the 14th, was now completed as far as Nahakki.

At dusk the same evening the enemy commenced a desultory fire on the 1st Brigade camp at Nahakki, which was kept up till 3 a.m. A Subadar, 59th Rifles, was slightly wounded, one mule driver killed and another wounded; some animals were also hit.

On 16 May the 2nd Brigade moved to Nahakki, taking over that place from the 1st Brigade, which moved to Kasai, a village about 3 miles distant, at the foot of the Darwazagai Pass.

== Operations of 16 and 17 May ==
On 16 May notices were issued from Nahakki to all the clans informing them that the British had no intention of annexing their country, and that at the conclusion of the operations there would be no change in British relations with them.

On the same day, the punishment of Khwaizai was commenced. At 5:30 a.m. a column under Brigadier-General Anderson, strength as per margin, moved out of Nahakki and advanced up the Bohai Dag with the object of blocking the northern side of the Khapak Pass, in conjunction with an attack upon the pass from the south by troops from the 2nd Brigade, should the pass be still held by the enemy.

In the meantime the remainder of the 1st Brigade were ordered to move the baggage and supplies of the 1st Brigade from Nahakki to Kasai, and prepare a new camp at that place, ready for the column on its return in the evening. The post at Nahakki was held by the 22nd Punjabis until relieved by the 2nd Brigade.

Orders had been issued to the cavalry to push on as fast as possible to the Khapak Pass, keeping up communication however with the brigade, while the remainder of the force moved along the base of the hills on the south bank of the Bohai Dag, passing to the south of Ato Khel village, which point was reached 'at 7-30 a.m. The cavalry however on approaching Sur Dag found several of the enemy holding the hills south of that village, and were forced to engage them in a dismounted action before any further advance could be made.

At 8:45 a.m., the advance-guard of the infantry was fired on from the spur north of Zanawar China village. The column accordingly moved into the bed of the Bohai Dag, while a double company was sent to gain possession of a long spur, which runs in a north-westerly direction between the villages of Gudai Tangi and Ahad Kor, and the seizure of which would protect the left flank.

When this had been done, the advance was continued with this: double company as a pivot, as far as Ahad Kor. Here the column watered from a large tank known as Ata Jor, which is about 1.5 miles east of Khan Beg Kor on the left bank of a nala joi nin g the Bohai Dag from the foot of the Khapak Pass.

Meanwhile, the cavalry had been kept on the right front with orders to advance towards the Khapak Pass. At this moment some of the enemy were observed close to the south-east end of Khan Beg Kor, but these were quickly dispersed by the guns, and the advance was then resumed as far as a spur lying to the south-east of Ahad Kor. This was occupied by a double company, with the cavalry in front in Khapak village. It was now seen that the pass itself was already held by the 55th Rifles from the 2nd Brigade; the column was accordingly halted, and the destruction of the surrounding villages was commenced. This was completed by 2 p.m., without molestation from the enemy, except for some shots fired at the cavalry m Khapak village, and the retirement was then commenced with the 59th Rifles forming the rear-guard. As soon as the rear-guard reached the junction of the Khapak and Bohai Dag nalas, the enemy began to follow up the retirement with gradually increasing numbers and boldness; and as casualties commenced to occur a double company 57th Rifles was placed in ambush, a short distance to the west of Ato Khel. This double company, allowing the rear-guard to pass through them in their retirement, were enabled to pour a heavy fire into the following enemy, hitting three of them. Then, as the retirement was continued, two guns were ordered into action just north of Ato Khel village to cover the final movement into camp at Kasai. During this withdrawal from the Khapak, the 59th Rifles, who formed the rear-guard suffered nine casualties, viz., one native officer killed and one native officer and seven men wounded, whilst the double company 57th Rifles, placed in ambush near Ato Khel, had one man wounded in retiring.

On arrival in camp, the occupation of the eight previously selected piquets was carried out, though not without some difficulty, as the enemy kept up a desultory fire on the piquets while building sangars, by which one man 22nd Punjabis was wounded.

In the meanwhile as the scouts of a half-company 59th Rifles were advancing to take possession of No. 8 Piquet, some 1,500 yards south of the camp, fire was suddenly opened on them from the low hill on which the piquet was to be placed; two men were hit and the half-company forced to retire. Artillery fire was then brought to bear on the hill from camp, and the 59th Rifles received orders to take the hill, under cover of the guns. This was well and quickly done, with the further loss of one man.

The digging of the perimeter was then resumed and completed during which time the piquets on the north side of camp reported that the enemy were collecting on the hills to the north-west, and in the valley to the north of camp, on the further side of the Darwazagai Pass. Other parties of the enemy were observed on both sides of the Bohai Dag, near Ato Khel village, but it was too dark to take any offensive action.

Before darkness had completely set in firing into camp commenced and large numbers of the enemy began to gather round Nos. 6 and 7 Piquets, on the west side of camp, held by the 22nd Punjabis, while others moved towards Nos. 1 and 2 Piquets on the north-east, held by the 57th Rifles. The centre piquets held by the 53rd Sikhs were almost entirely unmolested. The night which now commenced was extremely dark—thick clouds obscuring the moon - whilst later it became cold and sharp showers of rain began to fall. Firing round the above-mentioned piquets soon became heavy, and the enemy could be plainly heard shouting, blowing calls on a trumpet, and playing dols. Shortly after 9 p.m. Lieutenant-Colonel Fowler, commanding the 22nd Punjabis, reported to General Anderson that Nos. 6 and 7 Piquets had signalled asking for more ammunition, and saying that many casualties had already occurred, whilst the enemy, who were close all round the sangars, were rapidly increasing in numbers. General Anderson, therefore, ordered a double lamp signalling station to be established in that part of the 22nd Punjabis’ perimeter, which lay nearest to the two piquets. Both piquets then signalled down that they were hard pressed. Soon after this the lamp of No. 6 Piquet was put out of action. Shortly after 10 p.m. two men of No. 6 Piquet managed to make their way into camp down the eastern slope of the hill, and reported that ammunition was running low, that two non-commissioned officers had' been killed, several other men wounded, and that the enemy were so numerous and so close to the piquet, that unless reinforced there was great danger that the piquet might be rushed. At the same time a lamp message was received from No. 7 Piquet reporting that the native officer and a non-commissioned officer had been wounded, —the command devolving upon Naik Jehandad Khan— and that the enemy, who completely surrounded the sangar on three sides, were very numerous.

As the camp would have at once become untenable had either of the piquets been carried by the enemy, besides the loss of life, rifles and ammunition entailed, General Anderson decided immediately to reinforce No. 6, where the pressure was greatest. About this time another sepoy arrived from No. 6 Piquet, shot through the arm, and confirmed the previous report. All arrangements were quickly made, officers were posted around the perimeter to prevent any fire from the perimeter during the advance of the reinforcing party, and all piquets were warned that No. 6 Piquet was about to be reinforced. Ammunition carriers with plenty of ammunition were got ready, and a pass word agreed on. About 11 p.m. the reinforcement consisting of 50 rifles 22nd Punjabis under command of Major Climo (24th Punjabis, attached to 22nd Punjabis), and Lieutenants Webb and Money, 22nd Punjabis, and accompanied by the company dol and sarnai players, moved out of the camp. As they approached the lower slopes of the hill on which No. 6 Piquet was situated, heavy fire was opened upon them bv the enemy. The dols' and sarnais struck up, and they advanced, driving the enemy down the further side of the ridge and reached the piquet. Major Climo then signalled that in his opinion the hill should be held for the remainder of the night by a double company, and to this General Anderson agreed. Rain began to fall heavily and as it had now become very cold Major Climo again signalled down, this time requesting that a relief party might be sent with blankets, waterproof sheets, and filled water bottles for those remaining on the hill, and also blanket-stretchers to take down the deadband wounded, who occupied nearly all the available space in the piquet. Arrangements were made for the two parties to meet at the bottom of the hill below the piquet, and a double company 22nd Punjabis, under Captain Cooke (24tb Punjabis attacked 22nd Punjabis), then started.

Meanwhile, the enemy, who had been to some extent driven away from No. 6 Piquet, commenced a most determined close attack on No. 7, which however managed to hold its own. The signaller in this piquet, Sepoy Ram Singh, 22nd Punjabis, in the endeavour to keep touch with Nahakki as well as with the camp at Kasai, worked his lamp outside the piquet, as something interfered with the line to Nahakki, until he was wounded. He then got into the sangar and took a rifle, but the enemy were so close to him that they captured his lamp.

The relief party meanwhile reached No. 6 Piquet and at 2 a.m. the dead and wounded were brought in, followed shortly after by all the men not left on the hill. Throughout this time Nos. 1 and 2 Piquets held by the 57th Rifles had both been hotly engaged, but succeeded in repulsing the enemy without loss to themselves, though three rifles were cut through the barrel by bullets and completely destroyed. All the piquets engaged reported that they had seen many dead and wounded Mohmands being carried down the hills, and the two men of No. 6 Piquet, who made their way into camp, stated that many dead bodies were passed on the way down the hill to camp. At 2:15 a.m. the enemy drew off and firing was subsequently slight. The total casualties during the night amounted to one native officer and seven men killed, and eleven men wounded, all of the 22nd Punjabis, and of these all, except one man shot in camp, and one of the reinforcing party, occurred in Nos. 6 and 7 Piquets.

The following day was spent by both brigades in the destruction of villages within reach of the two camps, Kasai and Nahakki. From Kasai a column strength as per margin, left camp at 8 a.m. and proceeding over the Darwazagai Pass advanced up the Kadahari valley. the enemy showed little inclination to fight, and though large numbers were seen on the hills some fourteen villages were burnt and two towers destroyed almost without opposition. At 1:30 p.m. the column commenced its retirement, and though a few of the enemy attempted to follow up, reached camp at Kasai without a single casualty, the hills in this valley being well suited for a rearguard action.

From Nahakki the 2nd Brigade sent out two column, strength as per margin, which destroyed several villages to the east and north-east of Nahakki. Both columns left camp at 8:30 a.m., the first, under General Barrett in person, dealing with the village of Sro and the western hamlets of Gumbatai; and the second, under Colonel Phillips, 28th Punjabis, with Khajak Shah, Khwaja Kuhai, and Chingai. Here also the enemy seemed disinclined to fight, and only some slight opposition was offered by a number of men on the heights above Sro and Gumbatai, but these were quickly dislodged by the guns, and both columns returned to camp without suffering any casualties. Near Sro a spring of excellent water was discovered. This was cleaned out, and from this date drinking water for the camp at Nahakki was drawn from this place.

It had been intended that General Barrett's column, in addition to destroying the villages mentioned above, should carry out a reconnaissance of the Inzari Pass leading into the Pandiali valley. To this end the Officer Commanding 54th Sikhs was ordered to advance with his battalion along the high ground on the right flank of General Barrett's column, until he reached a position overlooking the pass, and covering the approach thereto from the northwest. Owing, however, to some misunderstanding of the orders received by him, he halted his battalion far short of the position intended, and the project had therefore to be abandoned.

As usual firing into camp was carried on for several hours that night, but only one casualty resulted.

== Operations of the 2nd Brigade against the Khwaizai: May 18, 19 and 20 ==
All the country within reach of Nahakki had now suffered severely, and Sir Janies Willcocks decided to send out a column to punish the Khwaizai still further, and, if possible, destroy the Koda Khel villages at the head of the Bohai Dag at the same time.

For this purpose he gave orders for the 2nd Brigade, reinforced by the 57th Kifles from Kasai, to leave Nahakki next day, the 18th, and advance up the Bohai Dag, returning to Nahakki on the 3rd day.

At 5:30 a.m. therefore on the 18th, the 2nd Brigade moved out from Nahakki, and passing close to the 1st brigade camp at Kasai, where they were joined by the 57th Rifles, commenced to advance up the bed of the Bohai Dag nala. Meanwhile, the piquets overlooking Nahakki were taken over by the 59th Rifles, the remainder of the 1st Brigade with all the baggage leaving Kasai for Nahakki at 12-30 p.m.

Shortly after passing Halimzai limits the 2nd Brigade was fired on from both sides of the valley, and it quickly became evident that the enemy, who held a position extending for about 2 miles from the half ruined village of Sur Dag on the right, along the steep ridge north of the road to the high range above Mazrina, would have to be dislodged before any further advance could be made. In addition to this position the enemy also held the spurs overlooking Zanawar China on the south side of the road, and the village itself. The advance-guard, which was composed of two squadrons 21st Cavalry and the 55th Rifles under Colonel Nicholls, were soon hotly engaged, the cavalry leading the advance dismounted.

As it was advisable first to clear Zanawar China and the spurs above it the 28th Punjabis were sent to storm these heights, supported by two guns of the 28th Mountain Battery and the half battalion of the 34th Pioneers, the latter being ordered to move straight on the village and destroy its defences.

Meanwhile, the 23rd Mountain Battery had come into action against the heights to the north, which were strongly held by the enemy. As the attack of the 28th Punjabis on the heights to the south developed, orders were issued to the 57th Rifles to carry those to the north, covered by the fire of the guns and of the dismounted cavalry and the 55th Rifles, with the Seaforth Highlanders and 54th Sikhs in reserve. Major Gray, commanding the 57th Rifles, planned and conducted this attack with promptness and skill, and it was carried out with great spirit. No sooner were the lower slopes of the hill in British possession, than large numbers of the enemy, who had been holding the ravines below, commenced to climb the steep rocky face of the hill towards the left of their position, where they came under a brisk fire from guns, rifles and maxims, and suffered heavy loss, the survivors making good their escape over the high ridge towards Mazrina. Further to the left the 57th Rifles continued to force their way up, and after some hand-to-hand fighting gradually succeeded in dislodging the enemy. Many dead bodies were passed on the way up and five prisoners taken, four of whom were wounded.

The action was now over; to the left the 28th Punjabis had been equally successful in clearing the spurs above Zanawar Chinar whilst the Pioneers had quickly gained possession of the village itself. Here an unfortunate incident occurred, as, while the Pioneers were engaged in the destruction of the village, a party of 8 swordsmen, who had remained concealed in a cave in the hillside nearby, made a sudden attack upon the Pioneers who, being taken at a disadvantage, lost 3 of their number killed and 2 wounded before the ghazis were disposed of. The 55th Rifles had meanwhile been occupied further west beyond Gudai Tangi, and the tappers and Miners now received orders to destroy the defences of that village, and also those of Sur Dag.

British casualties in this action were as follows:

- 3 British officers wounded
- 3 native ranks killed
- 3 native ranks died of wounds
- 21 native ranks wounded

Those of the enemy, whose numbers were estimated at from 500 to 1,000, were computed at 60.

The enemy had now completely disappeared, and, the road being clear, the advance was continued. The cavalry were ordered to move to Khan Beg Kor, covering the front and right flank of the infantry; the Seaforth Highlanders, 54th Sikhs and 23rd Mountain Battery were directed to march straight to the Ata Jor tank, which had been selected as the camping ground for the night, and the remaining troops were told to follow as soon as the destruction of the various toners and villages had been completed.

On arrival at the tank detachments from each corps were left to dig the entrenchments, whilst the remainder advanced to Khan Beg Kor, and attacked the ridge behind the village, which had been reported to be strongly held by the enemy. In this attack the 54th Sikhs formed the right, and the Seaforth Highlanders the left, with the guns of the 23rd Mountain Battery covering the advance. Little opposition was met with, however, and, in spite of the difficult ground, the ridge was quickly in British possession, and a squadron of cavalry advanced as far as the foot of the pass in rear of the village. Here there was another tank, and all the transport animals were sent for to get water and forage, while the Sappers and Pioneers blew up the numerous towers.

The camp that night being on an open plain, no outlying piquets were posted, and though firing was continuous and fairly heavy throughout the night, very little damage was done.

Next day at 5:30 a.m. the force advanced to Kung, the largest of the Khwaizai villages. The 54th Sikhs, who formed the advance-guard, piquetted the spurs of the range south-east and south of the village, while the Seaforth Highlanders and a double company 55th Rifles occupied a steep ridge to the north; the cavalry meanwhile operated in the main valley in the direction of Koda Khel, thereby guarding the left flank and real of the brigade. Very little opposition was offered, however, and, as soon as the crest of the heights was in British possession, the Sappers and Pioneers were enabled to enter the village and commence the work of destruction, a few shots only being fired at them from the high crags in rear of the village.

It had been General Barrett's original intention to continue his advance to the Baezai village of Koda Rhel and destroy that village the same day; but this could only have been done if the work of destruction of Rung had been completed by 10 a.m. at the latest. The opposition met with at Rung had, however, delayed matters and it was nearly midday before the village was finished with. Owing partly to this fact, and also to the difficult nature of the ground which would have had to be traversed in the retirement to Ata Jor camp from Roda Rhel, the idea of visiting that village had to be abandoned. When all the towers of Rung therefore, had been blown up the main body of the force withdrew to the south-east towards Wucha Jawar, the 54th Sikhs remaining in position to cover the advance, whilst the 28th Punjabis crossed by a pass south-east of Rung to the heights overlooking Wucha Jawar from the north. The towers of this village were then destroyed, as also those of a smaller village further south called Shah Ratol. The whole force then returned to camp, which had been held during the day by a half battalion, 28th Punjabis, and a company from each of the other regiments under the command of Colonel Phillips.

Firing into camp that night resulted in one sepoy and one follower being wounded.

Next day the entire baggage of the column, escorted by the 57th Rifles, 55th Rifles and 2 guns 28th Mountain Battery, under Colonel Nicholls, was sent back to Nahakki, leaving Ata Jor camp at 6 a.m. The remainder of the force marched at 5:30 a.m. to Mazrina. Covered by the cavalry the 54th Sikhs piquetted the hills to the west of Mazrira and the 28th Punjabis those to the east; the march was practically unopposed, and the village of Mazrina and the hills around were soon in British possession. The towers, etc., were then destroyed by the Sappers and Pioneers, after which the column commenced its retirement from the Mazrina valley. This movement was the occasion for a desultory fire being opened on the piquets in the hills, but the column itself was withdrawn without incident. Meanwhile, the cavalry had been engaged all the morning with small parties of the enemy, who had come down to the deserted camping ground at Ata Jor soon after the departure of the baggage. Throughout the retirement down the Bohai Dag the rear-guard, composed of the 54th Sikhs, was freely engaged for a great part of the way in, and suffered 5 casualties whilst one man of the 21st Cavalry was also wounded. On arrival at Kasai the 57th Rifles—part of the baggage escort—rejoined the 1st Brigade, which had left Nahakki the same day to commence a tour, which should deal with the Utmanzai, Safis, Dawezai, and Ambahar Utman Khel in the order named.

== Operations of the 1st Brigade from the 20 to 26 May ==
Whilst the 2nd brigade was engaged in the Bohai Dag, Sir James Willcocks and the 1st Brigade remained in camp at Nahakki. Here on both nights, 18th and 19th, the camp was heavily fired into, the enemy, said to be Dawezai and Utmanzai, accompanying their fire with tom-toms and much shouting and abuse. On the 18th one man was killed and one wounded, and on the 19th three men were wounded and several animals hit.

On the 19th Sir James Willcocks issued orders to Brigadier General Anderson to concentrate the force detailed in margin at Lakai on the afternoon of the 20th for operations expected to extend over a period of 5 days—5 days’ rations for men and 2 days’ grain for animals to be carried. On the same day the Battalion 34th Pioneers left at Ghalanai were ordered up to Nahakki, their place being taken by let battalion, West Yorkshire Regiment, from Dand.

In accordance with these instructions the troops in Nahakki, with the exception of 1 section No. 8 Mountain Battery and 6 companies, 22nd Punjabis, who were left to hold the camp till the arrival of the 2nd Brigade, marched out at 6-15 a.m. towards Kasai, where they entered the bed of the Bohai Dag and turned towards Lakai This circuitous route was adopted both in order to effect a junction more easily with the 57th Rifles, and also owing to the broken nature of the ground between Nahakki and Lakai.

As the advance-guard approached Kasai the hills on either side of the Darwazagai Pass were found to be held by small parties of the enemy, who, however, were easily driven off without loss. The hills were then piquetted, so as to cover the march of the main body down the Bohai Dag to Lakai, whilst one section No. 8 Mountain Battery and 4 companies, 59th Rifles, under Lieutenant-Colonel Carruthers were left at Kasai to ensure the junction of the 57th Rifles from the 2nd Brigade, and the detachment left in Nahakki. At 10:30 a.m. the 57th Rifles reached Kasai and passed on towards Lakai, where the main body was then halted and all transport animals unloaded and watered. After a short rest a cavalry reconnaissance was pushed on towards Yakh Dand with orders to report on the nature of the line of advance, and on the water supply at Umra Kalai, where native reports showed the existence of at least one good tank. About noon the cavalry reported that they had reached Umra Kalai after some slight opposition, but that their further advance was barred by a body of about 200 of the enemy, who were occupying a small village about 150 yards north-east of Umra Kalai and the band of the tank, which was situated about 300 yards north-east of the small village, whence they kept up a desultory but accurate fire. An infantry covering party was then sent over to the north bank of the Bohai Dag, whilst the Sappers and Miners prepared two tracks out of the nala on to the table land to the north of it for the passage of the transport. When these were complete and the two detached forces had joined the main body at about 3 p.m., two sections No. 8 Mountain Battery, 53rd Sikhs and 57th Rifles were moved across the nala on to the high table land on the north bank, while the transport was loaded up, and moved down the nala en masse and formed up on a broad front behind the troops. By 4 p.m. all was ready for an advance, and the troops moved forward towards Umra Kalai. The force was now disposed as follows: Front line, 67th Rifles on right, 4 guns No. 8 Mountain Battery in centre, 53rd Sikhs on left, covering a front of about 300 yards on each side of the track to Umra Kalai; right flank guard, 2 guns No. 8 Mountain Battery with an infantry escort and 1 squadron, 21st Cavalry; left flank guard 1 squadron, 21st Cavalry; general reserve, in rear of centre, 59th Rifles and No. 6 Company Sappers and Miners. The massed baggage and supply columns followed the general reserve under escort of the 22nd Punjabis, which regiment also formed the rear-guard.

As the advance commenced the enemy fired a few shots from Umra Kalai village, wounding one of the brigade signallers, but made no Henous attempt to hold the village, withdrawing rapidly to the north as the infantry advanced and disappearing into very broken ground.

Midway between the villages of Umra Kalai and Yakh Dand, situated about 2 or 2.5 miles apart, is the large Yakh Dand Nala. The left bank of this nala, which runs west to east, lies close under the hills which divide the Utmanzai and Dawezai territory, whilst the right bank is joined by several very broken and precipitous tributary nalas, which with their network of innumerable feeders constitute an extremely broken and difficult piece of country, movement over which in formed bodies was almost impossible. Into this ground the enemy evidently purposely withdrew, for there he could be easily reinforced from Yakh Dand, and his local knowledge of tracks would be most valuable to him. As the British advanced lines pushed on into this broken ground the action rapidly became hot, and casualties began to occur all along the line, but in spite of this the infantry forced their way up to the south bank of the main nala, and inflicted heavy loss on the enemy, who withdrew up the northern bank into the hills and the broken ground around Yakh Dand: the guns meanwhile kept up a heavy fire and were most effective. The cavalry both on the right and left were also engaged with parties of the enemy who kept creeping up the nalas, and attempting to turn the flanks. The extreme right flank was therefore reinforced by No. 6 Company Sappers and Miners and the front line were ordered not to advance beyond the south bank of the big nala, but to make all preparations for an orderly retirement on Umra Kalai and a hamlet close by, where Sir James Willcocks had in the meantime decided to halt for the night.

As the transport arrived the baggage was unloaded near the sites decided on for the bivouac of the corps to which it belonged, and an attempt made to water the mules at the tank. For this purpose the 59th Rifles were thrown into the fight at this point, and the 22nd Punjabis as they came up took their place as general reserve. The enemy were able, however, to keep up so heavy a fire on the tank from the network of nalas close to it, that after some six mules had been shot the attempt to water the animals was abandoned. It was now beginning to get dusk and every available man not in the firing line was utilized in preparing the perimeters of the two villages, while orders were despatched to the 63rd Sikhs and 57th Kifles to withdraw on camp, their retirement being assisted by parts of the 22nd Punjabis and 59th Rifles respectively, while the guns, though much hampered by a blinding duststorm which made laying very difficult, rendered good support. As the withdrawal was carried out the enemy followed closely taking the fullest advantage of the intricate nature of the ground. Groups of ghazis could be seen suddenly appearing from nalas, and dashing sword in hand after British parties, only, however, to fall either by shell or rifle fire. Some very close fighting took place during this period of the fight: on the right where the 57th and 59th were hotly engaged, Lieutenant Archibald, 82nd Punjabis, attached to the 57th Rifles, was shot dead and the safe removal of his body only managed by the determined stand made by a small party of the regiment for the purpose. On the extreme left the 21st Cavalry, holding a village covering the flank, were hotly engaged at close quarters, and lost Lieutenant Soole killed, the removal of whose body in safety was only accomplished by a fine piece of work under close fire.

Darkness was now coming on, and as all the transport was in and the perimeters in a more or less forward condition the troops were withdrawn as quickly as circumstances permitted, and disposed in the two villages for the night, the enemy keeping up a hot but not very effective fire while the finishing touches were being put to the defences. The nature of the ground was such that had the troops not worked with great intelligence and made the fullest use of mutual support and covering fire—British losses must have been much heavier than they were. Those of the enemy were heavy, considering the nature of the ground and their knowledge of all the available tracks. British casualties between 6 a.m. on the 20th and 6 a.m. on the 21st were as follows:

- British officers: 2 killed, 1 wounded
- British soldiers: 0 killed, 2 wounded
- Native officers: 1 killed, 1 wounded
- Other native ranks: 1 killed, 19 wounded
- Horses: 2 killed, 3 wounded
- Mules: 4 killed, 5 wounded

During the night a lamp message was sent to Nahakki asking for the despatch of a column to escort the wounded back to Nahakki in the morning, whilst the Seaforth Highlanders, one section 22nd Mountain Battery and an ammunition column were ordered to join the 1st Brigade in the morning. Owing to the state of the Highlanders’ shoes however, which were worn out by their hard marching in the Khaibar and Bohai Dag, the 55th Coke's Kifles were substituted for the Seaforths. Early in the morning the wounded were sent to Lakai, where the 1st Brigade escort handed them over to the troops from the 2nd brigade. The brigade then moved out of Umra Kalai at 9-45 a.m. and effected a junction with the reinforcements from Nahakki near the village of Hashim Kor.

The force then moved forward destroying some villages and towers en route, and although much delayed by the necessity for the construction of a track for the transport to cross a large nala which joins the main Yakh Dand Nala, arrived in camp at Habibzai (a hamlet of Kund Kuhai) without any interference from the enemy who seemed to have had enough on the previous day and were content with merely observing the march of the column and making demonstrations at the right flank guard. On arrival at Habibzai, however, a few of the enemy occupied some hills to the north-east of the village, and fired on the cavalry and, later on, the covering party while the perimeter was under construction, following them up when they withdrew to camp. In the course of the evening jirgas from the various sections of the Safis and the Mitai Musa Khel came into camp to arrange terms of submission.

The Musa Khel, influenced by their leading malik Ghairat Khan, accepted the terms imposed, but no agreement with the Safis was arrived at and their jirga left camp early next morning. That night firing into camp was heavy, but though the enemy appeared about to rush the camp at one time, accompanying their fire with much shouting, no attempt was made and very little damage done. Next morning a column composed of 0.5 squadron cavalry, 2 guns, 4 company Sappers and Miners, 22nd Punjabis and 59th Scinde Rifles was despatched at 5 a.m. under Lieutenant-Colonel Fowler with orders to burn the village of Bagh—the summer residence of the Gud Mulla. The rest of the force marched for Lakarai a quarter of an hour later. As Lieutenant-Colonel Fowler's column advanced small parties of the enemy fired on the leading troops, and on the left there was some sharp fighting, Captain O’Grady, 59t Rifles, being wounded. On reaching the Lakarai Kandao in front of Lakarai the heights on either side were found to be occupied by large numbers of the enemy, and it appeared as if a sharp action would take place, but, after a little firing and the capture of the outer low hills of the kotal by the advanced guard of Lieutenant- Colonel Fowler's force, the Safis held up the white flag, and decided to accept British terms, and the cease fire was accordingly sounded, though the other tribesmen continued to fire on British troops for some time, causing one or two casualties. They were, however, finally persuaded to retire by the two sections of Safis who had submitted, and the whole force then marched into Lakarai and settled down for the night. During the day's march a large number of villages and towers were destroyed.

As night fell, in spite of the fact that Lakarai was in the territory of the Safis who had just submitted, heavy firing into camp commenced, and was kept up for several hours causing 3 casualties amongst men and about 20 amongst the animals. On the 23rd a strong rear-guard was left under command of Lieutenant- Colonel Fuller, with orders to destroy Lakarai prior to departure. This was carried out most judiciously, and the rear-guard got away successfully without giving the enemy a chance, though matters at one time looked threatening. The advanced guard left camp at 5:15 a.m. for Turu in the Dawezai country. During the march, which was unmolested, the village of Inzari on the left bank of the large Pipal Nala, and the village of Shakar Ghundai on the right bank with several others were destroyed. At Shato Khel—one of a group of villages lying along the right bank of the Pipal Nala to the north of Turu—the column halted for the night. In the afternoon 4 small parties were sent out to destroy the villages in the immediate vicinity and in the execution of this duty two or three casualties occurred. The force was separated up among several villages for the night, and there was as usual heavy firing into camp, especially at the most easterly village occupied, where some six mules were hit.

On the 24th the force marched to Had in the Ambahar valley. Orders were given for the various detachments to rendezvous in the main Pipal Nala close to a tank, where the animals were watered before starting. Whilst moving to the point of assembly parties of the enemy followed up British troops, and subsequently engaged the rearguard throughout the entire march to Kargha. Prior to departure some 5 or 6 more of the hamlets around Turu were destroyed.

The Pipal Nala down which the force now commenced to advance is dominated on the right bank by the high Sarlara range, which runs roughly from west to east, parallel to the stream, and throws out a spur to the north-east. This spur, which runs steeply down to the nala-bed at a point of about 0.75 miles west of Kargha, commands both the Pipal and Ambahar valleys.

Soon after the advance commenced information was gained by a cavalry reconnaissance that this spur was singared and held by the enemy in considerable numbers, their position extending right across the Pipal Valley immediately above its junction with the Ambahar, with their right and centre guarded by a network of nalas very similar to that in front of Yakh Dand. On receipt of this information Brigadier-General Anderson ordered Lieutenant-Colonel Fuller commanding the advance-guard to remain in observation of the enemy. Four companies of the 57th Rifles under Captain Ames, (52nd Sikhs, attached 57th Rifles), were then ordered to take 150 rounds per man on the person and filled water-bottles, and to ascend to the top of the Sarlara range, move along the ciest and in due course down the big spur which formed the enemy's left. Meanwhile, the rear-guard, composed of 1 field troop cavalry, 2 guns No. 8 Mountain Battery, and the 55th Rifles were engaged with some of the enemy who were trying to get within range of the main body and baggage in the bed of the nala, while the 22nd Punjabis, who had been bivouacked furthest from the main nala were, with the assistance of 2 guns sent back to them, covering the watering of their baggage animals prior to the start. As Captain Ames’ column climbed the Sarlara it was opposed by some of the enemy, who hidden amongst the rocks near the crest were keeping up an ineffective fire on the column. Two guns of No. 8 Mountain Battery were then brought into action which cleared out this opposition and at length after a tremendous climb the 57th were seen on the crest line. Meanwhile, the advance-guard had been halted some 2000 yards in front of the enemy's position and had carefully refrained from opening the action, and the 2 sections No. 6 Company Sappers and Miners had been busily employed in blowing up towers and villages.

However, as soon as Captain Ames’ column was seen moving along the crest line the main body was ordered to move up and join the advanced guard, keeping the baggage close together on a broad front in the nala-bed. When the main body gained touch, the remaining 4 companies 57th Rifles were sent up to the lower slopes of the big spur with orders to join hands with the column working down from the crest; the 22nd Punjabis were told to prolong this line as far as the right bank of the Pipal Nala; 4 companies 59th Rifles to hold a knoll on the left bank of the nala opposite the left of the 22nd Punjabis, mainly with their maxims, the companies being concentrated as a reserve. The ground between this knoll and a small mud walled enclosure on the edge of the broken country was held by the 53rd Sikhs with 2 guns of the 22nd Mountain Battery, whilst the 4 guns of No. 8 Mountain Battery were entrenched between the 53rd and 59th. In order to avoid becoming involved in the intricate mass of naias in front of the British left, orders were issued that the signal for the advance would be the opening of fire by the guns, which would not take place until the column on the high crest of the Sarlara began to work downwards, and that all troops on the left bank would hold their ground as a pivot while those on the right bank pushed forward against the enemy's left. The transport was massed under the high banks of the nala and the animals unloaded, and in due course the guns opened fire and the advance commenced. The enemy (who appeared for the most part to be armed with swords only) offered little resistance, and mostly retired either through the naias towards their right, or back up the Ambahar valley. When the 57th Rifles and 22nd Punjabis reached the slopes overlooking Kargha they opened a heavy fire on the enemy, who were then in full flight, and the cavalry with the baggage column were ordered to push on down the nala and endeavour to get into the fugitives. This they successfully accomplished, sabering some 20 to 30 of them in the open beyond Had village. Two guns from the rear-guard were also ordered up and came into action alongside the 22nd Punjabis on the right bank of the nala.

Meanwhile, the transport was again loaded up, and the troops on the left bank of the Nala were ordered to move forward carefully over the broken country in front of the enemy's light, and as soon as they were in motion the transport was moved in solid mass down the bed of the Nala. When nearing the bend of the Nala round the big spur fire was suddenly opened on the transport from a couple of small buildings, which had been passed by the infantry in the advance, and one native driver was killed. As soon as the 22nd Punjabis from above, and 4 companies 59th Rifles who were with the baggage, saw what had happened they made a combined attack on the buildings, and No. 8 Mountain Battery fired a couple of shells into them at 600 yards. The attack was most successful: the 22nd Punjabis killing one man, and the 59th Rifles led by Lieutenant- Colonel Carruthers, Captain Murray and Lieutenant Anderson surrounding the remainder. Lieutenant Anderson led the storming party, and was himself the first man into the buildings. All the enemy, 5 in number, were either shot or bayonetted with the loss of only one sepoy, 59th Rifles, wounded.

After this episode, the advance of the 53rd Sikhs on the left, and their capture of some of the enemy's sangars on that flank, dislodged a body of some two or three hundred of the enemy who were apparently lying in ambush in a nala. These fled up the steep hill on which the enemy's right had been sangared, where they came under the fire of all the guns and suffered heavy losses, whilst some of the 53rd Sikhs also started up the hill in pursuit.

As all opposition from in front now ceased the troops moved on to the bivouac selected near Had village, and commenced to settle down and entrench the perimeter. When the rear-guard however had nearly reached the place where the 5 ghazis had opened fire from the two buildings, they were suddenly opened on from the left bank of the nala by some of the enemy, who must either have remained hidden in the nalas and let the 53rd Sikhs pass over them, or else have crept back unseen when the 53rd had passed on. Four casualties occurred quickly at one spot, the removal of the wounded men being well carried out under the leadership of Captain Houston, 55th Rifles, who himself with one man went back for the havildar first wounded. This was the last fighting that day, though the camp was as usual fired into at night, but without much result. British casualties on the 24th were slight, being 11 native rank and file wounded, one of whom subsequently died.

At 5-30 a.m. the following morning the force left Had and formed up in the nala-bed, where time was given for the mules to water, after which the force marched unopposed to the Kota Taraf Pass. The rear-guard however, which left camp at 7:10 a.m. after burning Had village, was followed up for a short distance by a few of the enemy, and one man of the 53rd Sikhs was wounded.

At 9 a.m. a column consisting of the 22nd Punjabis and 2 guns left the nala and proceeded to Gumbatai, the home of Mir Baz, which they destroyed. By 10 a.m. the force had arrived at the foot of the slope leading up to the Kota Taraf Pass, where the transport was split up into two columns, as there were two tracks leading to the pass itself.

At 12 noon the Gumbatai column rejoined the main body and by 2:10 p.m. the entire transport had crossed the pass. The force then moved into camp near Mulla Kalai on the banks of the Danish Kol, where water was very good and plentiful. The force had now arrived in Isa Khel territory, and as this clan had already sent in their submission, together with the Burhan Khel, to the Political Officer at Nahakki, no opposition was offered, and for the first time since leaving Dand the camp was not fired into at night. Additional rest was, moreover, afforded to the troops by the Isa Khel undertaking the duty of furnishing the outlying piquets for the camp.

Next day the brigade remained in camp at Mulla Kalai, where according to orders previously issued to General Barrett a convoy arrived from the 2nd Brigade at Nahakki, bringing provisions for the 1st Brigade during its return march via the Pandiali valley to Matta. The day was rendered very disagreeable by a bad dust-storm, which swept over the camp during the afternoon and lasted till late in the evening. The same day, as the jirqas of the Utmanzai and Dawezai had not yet complied with Government terms, Sir James Willcocks issued orders for the following action to be taken:

The force at Nahakki, with the following troops from Mulla Kalai:

- 1.5 Squadrons 21st Cavalry
- 2 Guns 28th Mountain Battery
- 22nd Punjabis
- 55th Rifles

were to move against Yakh Dand, and thence, if necessary, over the Shatai Pass into Dawezai territory to ensure the full compliance on the part of the Utmanzai and Dawezai with Government terms. General Barrett was then to proceed to Koda Khel and, failing this section's submission, to inflict summary punishment on it, returning thence via the Khapak Pass to Ghalanai.

Meanwhile, the remainder of the 1st Brigade were to remain halted for another day at Mulla Kalai, and then to return to Matta by the Pandiali route, executing the terms of punishment already agreed upon en route.

On the following morning General Barrett moved out of Mulla Kalai, with troops as per margin, and marched along the Danish Kol towards Yakh Dand. On reaching Yakh Dand the force was met by a portion of the Utmanzai jirga, who stated that they were willing to pay the fine for the whole clan, and suggested that the houses of those who had been unwilling to submit should be destroyed. This was agreed to and carried out. The Dawezai jirga, who had apparently been observing the course of events from the neighbouring hill tops, arrived and begged to be allowed to make complete submission on the irreducible minimum of the terms originally offered them. This Sir James Willcocks, who had accompanied the force, also agreed to, and as there was now no need to proceed beyond Yakh Dand the force marched to Nahakki, and camped there for the night. A few shots were fired by the Utmanzai, who had refused to submit, as the rear-guard left Yakh Dand, but without result. Meanwhile, General Anderson with his force, now reduced to 3 battalions infantry, 1 Mountain Battery and 1 Company Sappers and Miners remained at Mulla Kalai.

== Destruction of Koda Khel by the 2nd Brigade, and return of 1st and 2nd Brigades to Peshawar ==
All the various clans who had risen against Government had now either submitted or suffered heavy punishment, with the single exception of the Koda Khel Baezai.

This clan, however, presuming on the fact that the British had burnt Kung and yet not destroyed their own village, were now boasting that the British did not dare to attack them. It was therefore necessary to make a second expedition up the Bohai Dag to chastise them after which the Mohmand Field Force could evacuate the enemy's country without any loss of prestige. Consequently, on the morning of 28 May the troops at Nahakki moved out at 5:30 a.m. for the old camp at Ata Jor, leaving only a small detachment of cavalry and the 55th Rifles to hold Nahakki. No opposition was offered and camp was reached without incident, where half battalion Guides Infantry, from Ghalanai, and half battalion 34th Pioneers, joined the force. The latter, though starting from Nahakki, had marched to Ata Jor via, the Nahakki and Khapak Passes and had spent the day improving the road for the return of the force to Ghalanai via the Khapak Pass.

On the 29th the force advanced to Koda Khel, leaving one company from each battalion and a half battalion, 22nd Punjabis, with two guns 23rd Mountain Battery to hold the camp, while a half battalion, 34th Pioneers, was also left to continue work on the track over the Khapak. As the force advanced the ridge to the left of the road south-east of the village of Kutai was occupied without opposition by two companies, 28th Punjabis, which were left with orders to remain there for the day, and cover the retirement of the rest of the force in the evening. On arriving opposite the village of Kutai the Seaforth Highlanders were detached from the column with orders to move over the low hills beyond the village and occupy the ridge east of Koda Khel, and the 4 guns of the 23rd Mountain Battery came into position on the right flank of the Highlanders. The rest of the column followed the nala -bed as far as the entrance to the Koda Khel valley, from which point the Guides crossed the valley and commenced to climb the commanding hills west of the village covered by the fire of two guns 28th Mountain Battery, whilst the 54th Sikhs advanced along the nala east of the village and climbed the heights to the south. When this had been done the Pioneers and Sappers advanced direct on the village and commenced the work of destruction.

Two companies 28th Punjabis meanwhile held a spur north of the ridge occupied by the Guides, and the reserves, consisting of a half battalion 22nd Punjabis and three companies 28th Punjabis, remained under cover in the valley below. The cavalry held the open plain to the north. A few of the enemy who tried to hold the village were quickly dislodged. Their main force however kept to the high ridges, where they opposed the advance of the Guides and the 54th, and finally withdrew to the watershed line near the Afghan boundary, from which they kept up a fire on the British advanced posts throughout the day. At 12-30 p.m. when the villages had been completely destroyed, the force commenced to retire. As soon as British troops had left the villages, the 54th Sikhs began to withdraw from the heights above, with the enemy following closely. The Guides were the next to retire and were also followed up. The Seaforths were then ordered to hold on and form a pivot, until the rest of the force got clear of the Koda Khel valley, and then retire south-east through the low hills around Kutai. The enemy's fire soon slackened and the whole force reached camp at about 6 p.m. British casualties during the day were Lieutenant Walter Young, 67th Punjabis (attached 54th Sikhs), dangerously wounded, and 14 native rank and file wounded, the majority of these occurring during the withdrawal of the Guides and 54th Sikhs from the hills overlooking the village. During the night there was heavy firing into camp resulting in three casualties amongst the men, while nine mules and one camel were wounded.

Next day the force returned to Ghalanai. Early in the morning the Guides, 22nd Punjabis and 2 guns 28th Mountain Battery, were sent on to hold the Khapak Pass and piquet the heights to Ghalanai, and the main body left camp at 9-30 a.m. when the piquets had taken up their positions. The road over the pass was found to be very easy especially on the west side, where the ascent is very gradual, and no check occurred for, to avoid blocking the pass, the camels were sent on in advance, the mule transport following an hour later.

On the withdrawal of the piquets from the pass after the column had passed through, the enemy opened fire from the pass, and two sepoys of the Guides were slightly wounded, but no attempt at following up was made. The march was a long one, and in spite of the fact that there was little opposition, it was 7 p.m. before the rear-guard reached Ghalanai, where a new camp had been prepared for the brigade by the general officer commanding the lines of communication. During the day, when the rear-guard of General Barrett's column passed the Nahakki Pass, the troops under Colonel Nicholls which had been left to hold Nahakki moved down and joined the main force in their retirement to Ghalanai. Shortly after reaching camp Lieutenant Young succumbed to his wounds, and was buried at 7 p.m. the same evening.

The objects of the expedition had now been accomplished and there only remained the retirement to Shabkadar to be carried out.

The force under Brigadier-General Anderson, which had remained halted on 27 May at Mulla Kalai, had already reached Garhi Sadar, after a three days’ march down the Pandiali valley, during which they carried out the terms of punishment imposed on the Isa Khel and Burhan Khel, and agreed upon by them at Nahakki.

On the 28th May the force left Mulla Kalai, and moving up the Garang Nala, crossed the Garang Pass, which had been reconnoitred and improved on the previous day.

This pass, though very steep, was in good order for mule transport and the entire baggage crossed in two hours, the force reaching camp at Lagham, 10 miles from Mulla Kalai, at 3:15 p.m. The next day was spent at Lagham, whilst a reconnaissance was carried out down the Bahu river towards the Swat, and the Sappers and Miners improved the road over the Burjina Pass for the following day.

Two demolition parties were also sent out, which destroyed four villages under the directions of the Political Officer with the force.

On the 30th the final stage into Garhi Sadar was completed, and the troops moved into a camp which had been arranged and pitched by the 3rd Brigade. The march of 9 miles from Lagham proved very difficult, especially a distance of 4 miles from the top of the Burjina Kotal, and the track would have been impossible for any but mule transport.

On the same day a portion of the 2nd Brigade marched to Hafiz Kor, the remainder, consisting of the Guides, 22nd Punjabis, 28th Punjabis, and 2 guns 28th Mountain Battery, following on the next day. This division of the force was carried out to avoid overcrowding the route. During the following days both brigades dispersed, units returning to their respective peace stations.

== Aftermath ==
The expedition that had now ended had been most successful. All the tribesmen through whose territory the force had passed had submitted and paid the fines imposed on them, with the exception of the Kandahari Safis and the Koda Khel, and both of these latter had suffered severely. Further, the jirgas of the assured clans, i.e., Pandiali Mohmands, Gandao Halimzai, and Kamali Halimzai and also of the Khwaizai, attended at Ghalanai before the force left that place, and informed the Political Officer of their intention to prevent any Baezai raiding party from passing through their territory. This promise was ratified in writing and signed by the leading maliks.

British casualties from the commencement of the rising till the force left independent territory amounted to 52 killed (or died of wounds) and 205 wounded of all ranks; whilst those of the enemy were estimated at 450 killed. Besides these casualties among men our force sustained the loss of 185 horses killed and wounded, a large proportion of which were hit in camp at night giving an idea of the amount of night firing done by the enemy.
