= Fatehabad, Afghanistan =

Village in Nangarhar Province, Afghanistan

Coordinates: 34°21′28″N 70°13′31″E

Fatehabad (Pashto: فتح اباد) is a village in Surkh Rod District, Nangarhar Province, Afghanistan.

== History ==
Fatehabad has been the site of two major battles:

- During the Afghan Wars of Succession, a battle was fought there in 1041
- During the Second Anglo-Afghan War, a battle was fought there in 1879

== See also ==
- Nangarhar Province
