= Hector Lachlan Stewart MacLean =

Recipient of the Victoria Cross

Hector Lachlan Stewart MacLean VC
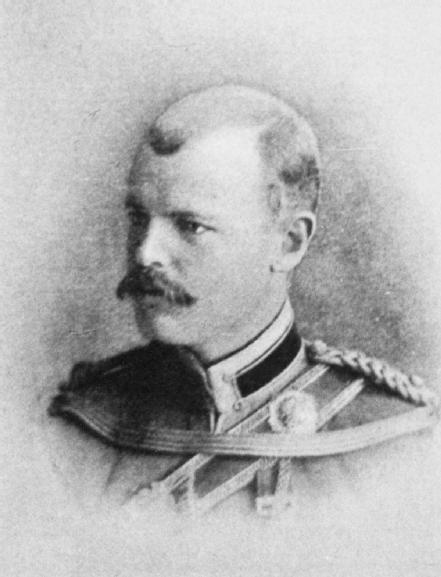
- Born: 13 September 1870; Sheikh Badin, Dera Ismail Khan, North West Frontier, British India
- Died: 17 August 1897 (aged 26); Nawa Bali, Upper Swat
- Burial place: Guides Cemetery, Mardan
- Military career
- Allegiance: United Kingdom
- Branch: British Army; British Indian Army
- Rank: Lieutenant
- Units: Northumberland Fusiliers; Staff Corps and Corps of Guides
- Conflicts: Chitral Expedition; Malakand Frontier War; Tirah Campaign
- Awards: Victoria Cross

Hector Lachlan Stewart MacLean, VC (13 September 1870 – 17 August 1897) was a Scottish recipient of the Victoria Cross, the highest and most prestigious award for gallantry in the face of the enemy that can be awarded to British and Commonwealth forces.

== Details ==
Hector MacLean was the eldest son of Margaret MacQueen (née Bairnsfather; 1846–1921) and Major-General Charles Smith MacLean CB CIE (1836–1921). Hector was born in a tent on the hill of Sheikh Budin, in the Northwestern Provinces of India, now Pakistan. He was educated at Fettes College in Edinburgh. He was 26 years old, and a lieutenant in the Indian Staff Corps and Corps of Guides, Indian Army during the Tirah Campaign when the following deed took place for which he was posthumously awarded the VC.

On 17 August 1897 at Nawa Kili, Upper Swat, British India, Lieutenant Maclean, with fellow officers Robert Bellew Adams and Alexander Edward Murray, Viscount Fincastle and five men of the Guides, went under a heavy and close fire, to the rescue of a Lieutenant Greaves of the Lancashire Fusiliers who was lying disabled by a bullet wound and surrounded by enemy swordsmen. While the wounded officer was being brought under cover he was killed by a bullet. Lieutenant Maclean was mortally wounded. His citation read:

During the fighting at Nawa Bali, in Upper Swat, on the 17th August, 1897, Lieutenant-Colonel R. B. Adams proceeded with Lieutenants H. L. S. MacLean and Viscount Fincastle, and five men of the Guides, under a very heavy and close fire, to the rescue of Lieutenant R. T. Greaves, Lancashire Fusiliers, who was lying disabled by a bullet wound and surrounded by the enemy's swordsmen. In bringing him under cover he (Lieutenant Greaves) was struck by a bullet and killed—Lieutenant MacLean was mortally wounded—whilst the horses of Lieutenant-Colonel Adams and Lieutenant Viscount Fincastle were shot, as well as two troop horses.

Bruce Bairnsfather was his maternal cousin.

His nephew, Vice Admiral Sir Hector Charles Donald Maclean, was the maternal grandfather of actor Rupert Everett.

== The medal ==
His VC is on display in the Lord Ashcroft Gallery at the Imperial War Museum, London.
