= Robert Adams (Indian Army officer) =

Scottish general of the Indian Army and recipient of the Victoria Cross

Major-General Sir Robert Adams VC KCB
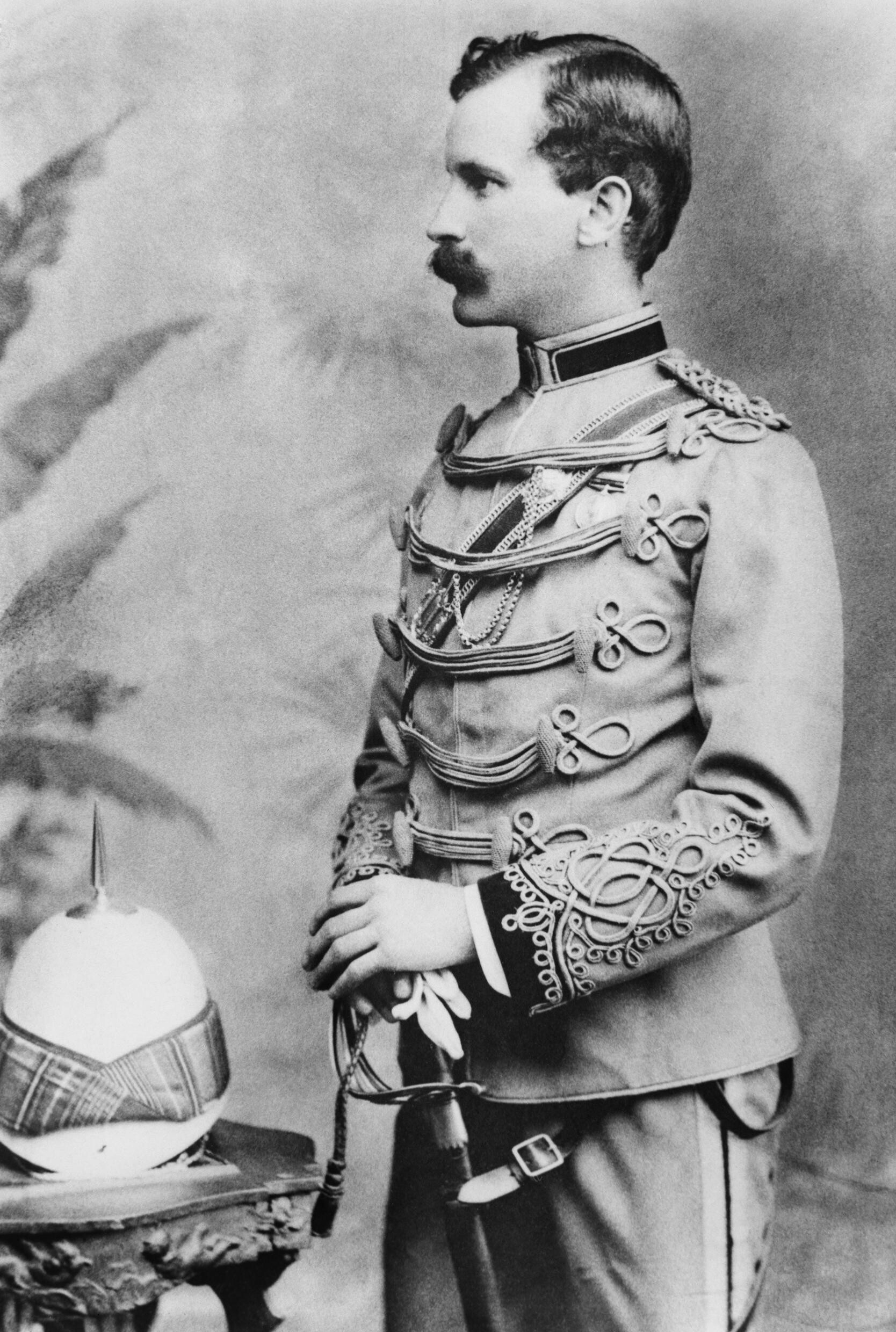
- Robert Adams, c1897 (IWM Q80464)
- Born: 26 July 1856; Muree, British India
- Died: 13 February 1928 (aged 71); Inverness, Scotland
- Burial place: Glasgow
- Relatives: Edward Donald Bellew VC (second cousin)
- Military career
- Allegiance: United Kingdom
- Branch: Bengal Army; British Indian Army
- Service years: 1876 - 1911
- Rank: Major-General
- Conflicts: Second Anglo-Afghan War; Chitral Expedition; Tirah Campaign
- Awards: Victoria Cross; Order of the Bath

Major-General Sir Robert Bellew Adams VC KCB (Muree, Punjab, India, 26 July 1856 – 13 February 1928, Inverness) was a Scottish general of the Indian Army and recipient of the Victoria Cross, the highest and most prestigious award for gallantry in the face of the enemy that can be awarded to British and Commonwealth forces.

== Military career ==
Robert Bellew Adams, the son of an officer of the Corps of Guides regiment of the Indian Army, entered the Army in 1876 as a sub-lieutenant in the 12th Foot (later the Suffolk Regiment). His promotion to lieutenant in 1878 was backdated to 1876. He transferred to the Bengal Staff Corps in 1879, served with his father's regiment in the Second Anglo-Afghan War and was promoted to captain in 1887. In 1891 he was appointed to command the cavalry of the Guides. He took part in the Chitral expedition and afterwards was promoted to major in 1896 and brevet lieutenant colonel "in recognition of his services during the operations of the Chitral Relief Force, 1895."

In 1897 the Guides took part in the Tirah campaign, and the following event took place:

During the fighting at Nawa Kili, in Upper Swat, on the 17th August, 1897, Lieutenant-Colonel R.B. Adams proceeded with Lieutenants H.L.S. MacLean and Viscount Fincastle, and five men of the Guides, under a very heavy and close fire, to the rescue of Lieutenant R.T. Greaves, Lancashire Fusiliers, who was lying disabled by a bullet wound and surrounded by the enemy's swordsmen. In bringing him under cover he (Lieutenant Greaves) was struck by a bullet and killed—Lieutenant MacLean was mortally wounded—whilst the horses of Lieutenant-Colonel Adams and Lieutenant Viscount Fincastle were shot, as well as two troop horses.
— London Gazette, 9 November 1897

Lieutenant Greaves was acting as war correspondent for The Times of India. Viscount Fincastle was also acting as a war correspondent, for The Times. A fuller account is given by Winston Churchill in The Story of the Malakand Field Force.

Adams and Fincastle were awarded the Victoria Cross (VC). At that time the VC was not awarded posthumously, and the London Gazette noted "Lieutenant Hector Lachlan Stewart MacLean, Indian Staff Corps, on account of his gallant conduct as recorded above, would have been recommended to Her Majesty for the Victoria Cross had he survived." MacLean was awarded a posthumous VC in 1907 after the policy had been changed.

During the same campaign Adams was mentioned in despatches three times and made a Companion of the Order of the Bath (CB). In 1899 he was appointed to the command of the Guides, and in September 1901 he was appointed aide-de-camp to King Edward VII and received the brevet rank of colonel. Promotion to the substantive rank of lieutenant-colonel followed on 11 September 1902. In June 1904 he was promoted to temporary brigadier general and given the command of the Umballa Cavalry Brigade. In March 1906 he was promoted to major-general and transferred to the Derajat Brigade, but due to illness he resigned the command in 1908. He was invalided out of the army in 1911 and appointed a Knight Commander of the Order of the Bath (KCB) in the King's Birthday Honours of 1912.

Adams died in retirement at Inverness in February 1928 at the age of 71. After cremation in Maryhill, Glasgow, his ashes were buried at Tomnahuich Cemetery, Inverness.

== Family ==
Adams was unmarried. He was the second cousin of Edward Donald Bellew, a Canadian WWI VC recipient.
