= List of Old Felstedians =

This is a list of notable Old Felstedians who are former pupils of Felsted School in Essex, England.

== Science and medicine ==
- John Wallis (1616–1703), Fellow of the Royal Society, mathematician and Divine, Savilian Professor of Geometry, Oxford University
- Isaac Barrow (1630–1677), Fellow of the Royal Society, mathematician, Master of Trinity College, Cambridge (1672–77), and 1st Lucasian Professor, Cambridge University (ODNBimage)
- William Byrd II (1674–1744), Fellow of the Royal Society, major Virginia Plantation owner, founder of Richmond, Virginia, diarist, author of the History of the Dividing Line, zoologist (ODNBimage)
- Percy Gilchrist, (1851–1935), Fellow of the Royal Society, inventor of steel-making from phosphorus-rich iron (ODNB)
- Charles Hose (1863–1929), zoologist and ethnologist (ODNB)
- C. V. Durell, (1882–1968), mathematician, prolific writer of school text books (ODNB)
- Reginald Pierson (1891–1948), Chief Aircraft Designer with Vickers-Armstrong from 1917 (ODNB)
- Frank Halford (1894–1955), aircraft designer, motor racing pioneer, Technical Director & Chairman de Havilland (ODNB)
- Joseph Henry Woodger (1894–1981), research biologist, prolific author (ODNB)
- Stephen Robert Nockolds (1909–1990), Fellow of the Royal Society, Geologist
- David Stafford-Clark (1916–99), psychiatrist, BBC & ITV psychiatry programme maker, Consultant Emeritus Guy's Hospital & United Hospitals, London University, Consultant Bethlem Royal Hospital & Maudsley Hospital (ODNB)
- Robert Macmillan (b. 1934), Professor of Mechanical Engineering (Geometrical Symmetry) Cambridge, Professor of Vehicle Design & Automotive Studies, Dean of Engineering, Cranfield Institute (1980–82), Asst. Professor & Fulbright Fellow MIT (1951–52)
- Tony Hunter (b 1943), Fellow of the Royal Society, biochemist and cancer biologist, Professor of Molecular and Cell Biology, Salk Institute, California
- Sir Marcus Setchell (b. 1943), CVO, HM The Queen's Surgeon-Gynaecologist
- Patrick Sissons (b. 1945), Regius Professor of Physic, Cambridge University
- Peter Kopelman (b. 1951), Principal of St George's, University of London, Professor of Clinical Medicine, London Hospital
- Andrew Smith (b.1954), Oral and Maxillofacial Surgeon, Dean and Professor, School of Dental Science and Head, Oral Health Centre of WA, University of Western Australia.
- Alex Haslam (b. 1961), Professor of psychology and ARC Australian Laureate Fellow in the School of Psychology at the University of Queensland.
- Antony Galione (b. 1963), Professor of Pharmacology, Fellow of New College, Oxford University
- Toby Walsh (b. 1964), is a Laureate fellow, and professor of artificial intelligence in the UNSW School of Computer Science and Engineering at the University of New South Wales and Data61 (formerly NICTA)
- Chris Smith (science communicator) (b.1975), Consultant virologist and a lecturer based at Cambridge University. A science radio broadcaster who presents the 'Naked Scientists'

== Military ==
- Nathaniel Rich (d. 1701), Colonel in Cromwell's New Model army, MP for Cirencester 1647–1650
- Major-General William Goodday Strutt (1762–1848), Governor Stirling Castle and Governor of Quebec (1837–48) (ODNB)
- General Sir Alfred Gaselee (1844–1918) GCB, GCIE, former aide-de-camp to Queen Victoria, action Afghan Wars, Boxer Uprising, China and India (ODNB)
- Walter Richard Pollock Hamilton (1856–1879), VC, Lt. Corps of Guides, 2nd Afghan War, portrayed in M.M. Kaye's novel The Far Pavilions and film of same
- Henry L. Hulbert (1867–1918), US Marine, awarded US (Congressional) Medal of Honor 1899, Croix de Guerre (France) 1918, Distinguished Service Cross (US) 1918, Purple Heart (US) 1918; US Navy destroyer ship named in his memory
- Brigadier-General Robert McDouall (1871–1941), Governor Fort Mackinac (1914–18)
- General Sir Hubert Huddleston (1880–1950), colonial administrator (ODNB)
- John Leslie Green (1888–1916), Capt. VC, 1916 RAMC, South Staffordshire Regiment
- Admiral Edward King (1889-1971), Lord Commissioner of the Admiralty
- Sir Charles King (1890-1967), Engineer-in-Chief (War Office), and Colonel Commondant, Royal Engineers
- Brigadier John Murray Rymer-Jones (1897–1993), CBE, MC (Bar), World War I, Assistant Commissioner, Metropolitan Police (1950–59)
- Air Vice-Marshal George Holford White (1904–1965)
- Major-General Basil Coad (1906–1980)
- General Sir Campbell Hardy (1906–84), Commandant Gen. Royal Marines (1955–59), Dir. Coal Utilization Council 1960–70
- Air Vice-Marshal Edward Crew (1917–2002), World War II Mosquito flying ace DSO with Bar, DFC
- Jeremy Howard-Williams D.F.C. (1922–1995), Second World War fighter pilot, who later became a writer
- Air Chief Marshal David Harcourt-Smith (b. 1931), Controller of Aircraft for United Kingdom Ministry of Defence, MoD Procurement Executive
- Lt. General Sir Peter Beale (b. 1937), KBE, RAMC, formerly Queen's Honorary Physician, Chief Medical Officer for the Red Cross (1994–2000), Surgeon General to UK Armed Forces 1991–1994
- General Sir Richard Dannatt (b. 1950), Chief of the General Staff (2006–2009)

== Politics and public service ==
=== Members of Parliament ===
- Henry Mildmay (1619–1692), MP for Maldon (1659), for Essex (1679–1692), Governor of Cambridge Castle
- William Byrd II Founder of Richmond, Virginia
- Richard Cromwell (1626–1712), Lord Protector of the Commonwealth of England, Scotland and Ireland 1658–1659, son of Oliver Cromwell Snr. MP for Hampshire (1654), Chancellor, Oxford University (ODNB)
- Henry Cromwell (1628–1674), Lord Deputy of Ireland and son of Oliver Cromwell Snr. MP for Cambridge University (1654) (ODNB)
- Hender Robartes (or Roberts) (1635–1688), MP for Bodmin (1661–1687)
- Robert Robartes (or Roberts) (1635–1681), MP for Bossiney (1661), Ambassador to the Court of Denmark
- Sir John Comyns (c. 1667 – 1740), MP for Maldon (1701–1708, 1716–1726), Lord Chief Baron of the Exchequer (1736), judge
- Sir Charles Barrington, 5th Baronet (1671–1715), MP for Essex (1694–1715), Vice-Admiral for Essex (1702–1705)
- Sir Anthony Abdy, 5th Baronet KC (1720–1775), MP for Knaresborough (1763–1775), barrister, anti-slave campaigner (ODNB)
- Bamber Gascoyne Snr. (1725–1791), MP for Maldon (1761–1763), Midhurst (1765–1770), Weobley (1770–1774), Truro (1774–1784) and Bossiney (1784–1786), 1st Lord of the Admiralty (1780–1781) (ODNBimage)
- Joseph Strutt (1756–1845), MP for Maldon (1790–1826), Okehampton (1826–1830)
- General Isaac Gascoyne (1763–1841), MP for Liverpool (1802–1831), pro-slavery campaigner, British Army officer (ODNB)
- Charles Western (1767–1844), Baron Western of Rivenhall MP for Maldon (1790–1812), Essex (1812–1832)
- William Hughes (1777–1852), Baron Dinorben of Kinmel Park, Denbigh, MP for Wallingford (1802–1831), ADC to the Queen
- Charles Gray Round (1797–1867), MP for N. Essex (1837–1847)
- James Dampier Palmer (1851–1899), MP (Con) for Gravesend (1892–1898), businessman and philanthropist
- John Philipps, 1st Viscount St Davids (1860–1938), financier and politician, Lib. MP for Mid Lanarkshire (1888–1894) and Pembrokeshire (1898–1904), 13th Baronet of Picton Castle (from 1912) (ODNB)
- Sir Geoffrey King (1894-1981), Treasury Solicitor's Department and Ministry of National Insurance
- Rupert Brabner, DSO DSC (1911–1945), RN, Fleet Air Arm World War II pilot ace, MP for Hythe (1939–1945), Under Sec. of State for Forces. Killed in flying accident in Canada
- Sir Eric Edwards Baron Chelmer, of Margaretting (1914–1997), Conservative Party joint-Treasurer and Deputy Chairman
- David Evan Trent Luard (1926–1991), Labour MP for Oxford (1966–1970) and (1974–1979), Parliamentary Under Secretary of State (Foreign Office), Fellow of St. Antony's College, Oxford and Labour, subsequently SDP politician (ODNBimage)
- Hugh Patrick Thompson (born 1935), MP for Norwich North (Con) (1983–1997), former Master at Manchester GS and Gresham's
- Andrew Tyrie (born 1957), MP for Chichester, (Con), Chairman Treasury Select Committee (from 2010)
- Charlie Elphicke (born 1971), MP for Dover, (Con) (from 2010)

=== Other public servants ===
- Edward Strutt Abdy (1791–1846), legal academic notable as an author on racism and race relations in the US (ODNB)
- Sir Charles Richard Mackey O'Brien (1859–1935), Governor of the Seychelles (1912–18) and Barbados (1918–25)
- Sir Charles Stevenson-Moore (1866–1947), Colonial Administrator, Director Criminal Intelligence for India, Chief Secretary Bengal (1910–14). Killed in Alps.
- Richard James Wilkinson (1867–1941), Malay scholar & lexicographer, Colonial administrator – Governor Sierra Leone (1915–21) (ODNB)
- Sir Arnold Weinholt Hodson (1881–1944), Governor of Falkland Isles (1926–30), Sierra Leone (1930–34) & Gold Coast (1934–41), Knight of St. John, African explorer, author
- Sir Maurice Holmes (1911–1997), Chairman of London Transport Executive (1965–69)
- Sir Roger Jackling (1913–86), HM Diplomatic Service, Permanent UK Rep. to UN, 1963–67 and former HM Ambassador to the Federal Republic of Germany
- Sir Terence Garvey (1915–86), HM Ambassador to USSR 1973–75
- Oliver Everett (b. 1942), CVO, Librarian Emeritus Windsor Castle, former Private Secretary to Princess of Wales (1981–83)
- Sir Robert Finch (b. 1944), Lord Mayor of London 2003
- John Orman Gilbert, (1907–1995), British resident to Brunei
- John Smedley (b. 1946), Brigadier, Private Secretary to the Earl and Countess of Wessex
- Howard Brush Dean III (b. 1948), Governor of Vermont (1991–2002), Democratic candidate 2004 United States presidential election
- Fergus Cochrane-Dyet (b. 1965), diplomat, British High Commissioner to the Republic of Malawi (2009–2011)

== Business ==
- Sir Allen George Clark (1898–1962), industrialist, former MD and pioneer at Plessey telecommunications (ODNB)
- John Beresford Fowler (1906–1977), interior decorator (ODNB)
- Sir Frederick Wood (1926–2003), Industrialist, Managing director of Croda International (1953–1986), Chairman of National Express (1972–1978)
- Sir Martyn Arbib, (b. 1938), financier, philanthropist, racehorse owner, founder Perpetual PLC now Invesco Perpetual Investment company
- Clive Fiske Harrison (b. 1939), Investment banker, founder of Fiske plc (Debrett's People of Today)
- Harry Stebbings Venture Capitalist

== Other academics/writers ==
- George Waldron (1690 – c. 1730), antiquary, author Description of The Isle of Man (1726) and Compleat works in Verse and Prose (1731), inspiration for Sir Walter Scott (ODNB)
- Thomas Cooke (1703–1756), translator of the classics, writer, playwright (ODNB)
- Thomas Brand Hollis (1719–1804), Fellow of the Royal Society, radical, Protestant dissenter, electoral reformist, Freeman of Glasgow (1741) (ODNB)
- Samuel Jackson Pratt (1749–1814), poet, playwright, novelist and early animal welfare campaigner.
- Cornelius Walford (1827–85), insurance writer & pioneer (ODNB)
- Arthur William a Beckett (1844–1909), humorist and journalist, editor of 'Punch' magazine (ODNB)
- Arthur Heygate Mackmurdo (1851–1942), Gothic revival architect and designer, social reformer, Arts and Crafts stylist, friend of Ruskin (ODNB)
- George Gordon Coulton (1858–1947), historian (ODNBimage)
- Hugh Chisholm (1864–1948), journalist, editor Encyclopædia Britannica (editions 11 & 12) (ODNB)
- Thomas Seccombe (1866–1923), writer, longtime deputy editor ODNB, Professor English Literature, Queen's University, Kingston, Ontario, Canada (ODNB)
- Albert Pollard (1869–1948), Founder Historical Assoc. (1906), Professor of Constitutional History, London Univ. (1903–31) (ODNBimage)
- J. R. H. Weaver (1882–1965), President of Trinity College, Oxford (1938–54), Editor ODNB (1928–37)
- Douglas Goldring (1887–1960), English writer and journalist (ODNB)
- Walter 'Sebastian' Sprott (1897–1971), sociologist, philosopher, psychologist, sometime member Bloomsbury group (ODNB)
- Sir Colin Alexander St John ("Sandy") Wilson (1922–2007), architect British Library, artist, art benefactor, Emeritus Professor of Architecture, Cambridge University
- John Shearman (1931–2003), art historian, specialist in Italian Renaissance, prolific author, Professor at Harvard (ODNB)
- Anthony Marriott (b. 1931), playwright, author of TV plays, also 'No Sex Please, We're British'
- Peter Goldie (1946–2011), Samuel Hall Professor of Philosophy, Manchester University, since (2005)
- Jeremy Horder (b. 1962), Fellow of Worcester College, Oxford, Professor Criminal Law, LSE
- Patrick Redmond (b. 1966), playwright, novelist, writer of psychological thrillers including The Wishing Game

== Sport ==
=== Olympians ===
- J W H T Douglas (1882–1930), English Test cricketer and captain and Olympic boxer (gold medal 1908), football for England (amateur) (ODNBimage)
- Norman Hallows (1886–1968), Olympic athlete, bronze 1500m winner 1908, former Olympic record holder 1500m
- Ivo Fairbairn-Crawford (1896–1998), Olympic athlete, 800m & 1500m (disqualified finalist) 1908, engineer, pilot, Executive Foreign Armament Department for Vickers Armstrong, International Half-Mile Champion 1906–07, One Mile International Champion 1909, Skiing for GB, International roller-skater champion at Olympia, London 1914–19
- William Moore (1890–1956), 1912 Olympics
- Herbert Perry (1899–1964), Olympic shooter, gold medal 1924 (team running deer double shots)
- Peter Decker (b. 1941), Olympic skier for USA, Winter 1960
- David Jones (b. 1941), Olympic 4 × 100 m bronze medal 1960, Commonwealth gold medal, and silver medal (200m) 1962
- Robert Cattrall (b. 1959), Olympic hockey player for Great Britain (captain), 1984 (bronze medal)
- Matt Coward-Holley (b. 1995), Olympic trap shooting Tokyo 2021, (bronze medal).

=== Cricketers ===
- Will Buttleman (born 2000), professional cricketer for Essex County Cricket Club
- Jordan Cox (born 2000), professional cricketer for England, Kent and Essex
- Thomas Curteis (1843–1914), first-class cricketer
- Chris Huntington (born 1987), first-class cricketer
- Daniel Grose (1903–1971), first-class cricketer
- Ernest Hall (1851–1936), first-class cricketer
- Arthur Jewell (1888–1921), first-class cricketer
- Robert King (1909–1992), first-class cricketer
- Nick Knight (born 1969), Test cricketer, cricket commentator and broadcaster
- Alistair MacLeod (1894–1982), first-class cricketer and cricket administrator
- Eric Morris (1890–1966), first-class cricketer
- Martin Olley (born 1963), first-class cricketer
- Percival Partridge (1879–1964), first-class cricketer
- Lloyd Paternott (born 1992), cricketer
- Tim Phillips (born 1982), professional cricketer for Essex
- Derek Pringle (born 1958), Test cricketer and journalist for The Observer and The Daily Telegraph
- John Stephenson (born 1965), Test cricketer and administrator
- William Tomlinson (1901–84), first-class cricketer and headmaster at St. Cyprian's Preparatory School, Eastbourne (1938–48)
- Elliott Wilson (born 1976), first-class cricketer and artist
- Vivian Woodiwiss (1896–1981), first-class cricketer

=== Other sports journalists ===
- Sean Fletcher (b. 1975), former BBC Sport and Sky Sports broadcaster, journalist

=== Other sports players ===
- Charles King (1860-1928), schoolmaster and footballer
- Robert King (1862–1950), clergyman and footballer for England (amateur)
- Max Malins (b. 1997), England international rugby union player
- Rory Hutchinson (b.1995), Scotland international rugby union player
- Toby King (b. 2002), professional footballer
- Martyn Lucking (born 1938 in Leigh-on-Sea) is a British former shot putter representing England at the Olympic Games, Commonwealth Games and European Championships.

== Theatre/music/art/broadcasting ==
- William Palmer aka Claud Allister (1891–1970), Hollywood film actor (1929–50) – 74 films including starring role in Oscar-winning Bulldog Drummond (1929)
- Stuart Burge (1918–2002), film director, producer, actor (ODNB)
- Robert Back (1922-2004), British maritime painter
- Kenneth Kendall (1924–2012), British broadcaster. At Felsted from 1935 to 1942, and one of Britain's earliest openly-gay television presenters.
- Richard Johnson (1927–2015), West End Theatre and film actor, writer and producer
- John Alldis (1929–2010), Chorus Master of the London Philharmonic Choir (1969–82) and Guildhall School of Music Choir, also numerous major overseas ensembles inc. Danish & Dutch State Choirs, double Grammy award winner
- Philip Latham (b. 1929), TV, film and West End actor
- Joe Henson (b. 1932), Farmer & Broadcaster, founder Rare Breeds Survival Trust
- Sam Walters (b. 1939) MBE, 1955 winner Public Schools' Mace (Debating), London theatre director, Founder Orange Tree Theatre, Richmond
- Max Stafford-Clark (b. 1941), London Theatre director, former director of Royal Court Theatre
- Andy Roberts (b. 1946), musician
- Richard Marson (b. 1960), British TV writer and producer, formerly Chief Editor Blue Peter children's TV programme
- Peter G. Dyson (b. 1968), Music Director Belmont Ensemble, St. Martin-in-the-Fields, and the South Bank Centre
- Sheila Nicholls (b. 1970), Lord's Cricket Ground streaker and singer/songwriter
- John Derek Sanders (1933–2003), composer, organist Gloucester Cathedral
- James Doherty (b. 1966), TV, Film and West End actor
- Alecky Blythe (b.1972), playwright and screenwriter
- Alastair Macaulay, writer and dance critic. Chief dance critic for The New York Times from 2007 until he retired in 2018.
- John Hopkins (political activist), (1937 - 2015), John "Hoppy" Hopkins was a British photographer, journalist, researcher and political activist.

== Clergy ==
- William Gouge (1575–1673), clergyman, prominent Calvinist preacher, writer (ODNB)
- Thomas Vincent (1634–1678), Puritan clergyman, dissident preacher (ODNB)
- Dr. Thomas Townson (1715–92), evangelist, scholar, writer (ODNB)
- Robert Carr Brackenbury (1752–1818), Methodist Puritan preacher, colleague of John Wesley (ODNB)
- William Barker Daniel (1754–1833), Rev., clergyman, writer on field sports (ODNB)
- Rev Robert Fellowes LLD (1771–1847), radical theologian, defender of Queen Caroline and benefactor of UCL
- Charles Smythies (1844–1894), Rt. Rev. Bishop of Zanzibar and East Africa
- Aylmer Skelton (1884–89), Rt. Rev. Bishop of Lincoln (1942–46)
- George Ernest Ingle (1895–1964), Rt. Rev. Suffragan Bishop of Willesden
- Dom Illtyd Trethowan (1907–93) OSB, philosopher, sub-prior of Downside Abbey
- George Reindorp (1911–1990), Rt. Rev., Bishop of Salisbury
- Richard Stanley Cutts (1922–97), Rt. Rev. formerly Bishop of Argentina and Eastern South America
- John Neale (b. 1926), Rt. Rev., inaugural Bishop of Ramsbury from 1974
- (Geoffrey) Jeremy Walsh (b. 1929) Rt. Rev., Former Suffragan Bishop of Tewkesbury
