= Death in Berlin =

1955 novel by Mary Margaret Kaye

- First edition
- Author: M. M. Kaye
- Original title: Death Walked in Berlin
- Language: English
- Genre: Mystery novel
- Publisher: Staples Press
- Publication date: 1955
- Publication place: United Kingdom

Death in Berlin published in 1955 (under the title Death Walked in Berlin) is a mystery novel by M. M. Kaye. The story, set in early Cold War Berlin, prior to the erection of the Berlin Wall, focuses on Miranda Brand who goes on a one-month vacation to the divided German city. She is invited there by her cousin Robert, a British Army officer stationed in Berlin, and his wife Stella. On the way, Brigadier Brindley relates to a party of British officers and their families - among them Miranda - a WWII story of a fortune in lost diamonds, in which Miranda herself is revealed to be mysteriously involved. This mystery from the past turns out to have very sinister present day implications. Miranda's vacation becomes increasingly ominous, with murders following each other, first on the night train and then in Berlin itself. Much of Berlin is still in ruins, the Cold War is raging and Miranda happens to witness the handover of secret information by a spy. However, the Soviets are not the villains here. They are very much in the background, as are the German inhabitants of Berlin, struggling to rebuild their devastated city (the book has virtually no German characters, apart from domestic servants in British homes). Rather, the devastated Berlin of the early Cold War serves as the backdrop to the lethal jealousies and tensions rending the enclave of British military personnel, their wives and domestic servants. At the explosive ending, Miranda comes close to being murdered herself - by the most unlikely of all suspects.

== Characters ==
- Miranda Brand - a young model on a vacation which turned nasty.
- Brigadier Brindley - a veteran officer with a penchant for story-telling.
- Robert Melville - Miranda's cousin, an easygoing, charming military officer.
- Stella Melville - Robert's wife, who had raised the orphaned Miranda from a young age.
- Andy Page - Robert's fellow officer, living in a troubled and disharmonious marriage.
- Sally Page - Andy's wife, who is in love with Robert and might be having an affair with him.
- Harry Marson - Another of Robert's fellow officers.
- Elsa Marson - Harry's wife, whose English bears traces of a foreign accent - but what exactly was her original language?
- Colonel Leslie - A seemingly bland and boring senior officer.
- Norah Leslie - The colonel's wife, who knows past secrets and harbors deep grudges.
- Lottie - The Melvilles' seven years old daughter, who knows more than she is telling.
- Wally - Lottie's nine years old friend, a naughty and clever boy who plays amateur detective - and is quite good at it.
- Mademoiselle Beljame - The cold and efficient governess who takes good care of Lottie. But is Beljame her real name?
- Friedel - The Melvilles' German house servant, who might have more on her mind than domestic service.
- Simon Lang - A highly capable detective, intelligence operative, and poker player. Is he in love with Miranda? Or does he suspect her of murder? Or both?

== Author's personal background ==
As noted by the author in the foreword to the book, it was inspired by having actually spent time in Berlin as the wife of a British Army officer. The book's social milieu of Berlin-based British officers and their wives was thus quite familiar to her. A similar background is given in the foreword to other books entitled "Death in ...".

== See also ==
- Death in Cyprus
- The Far Pavilions
- The Ordinary Princess
