= Harry Stebbings =

English venture capitalist (born 1996)

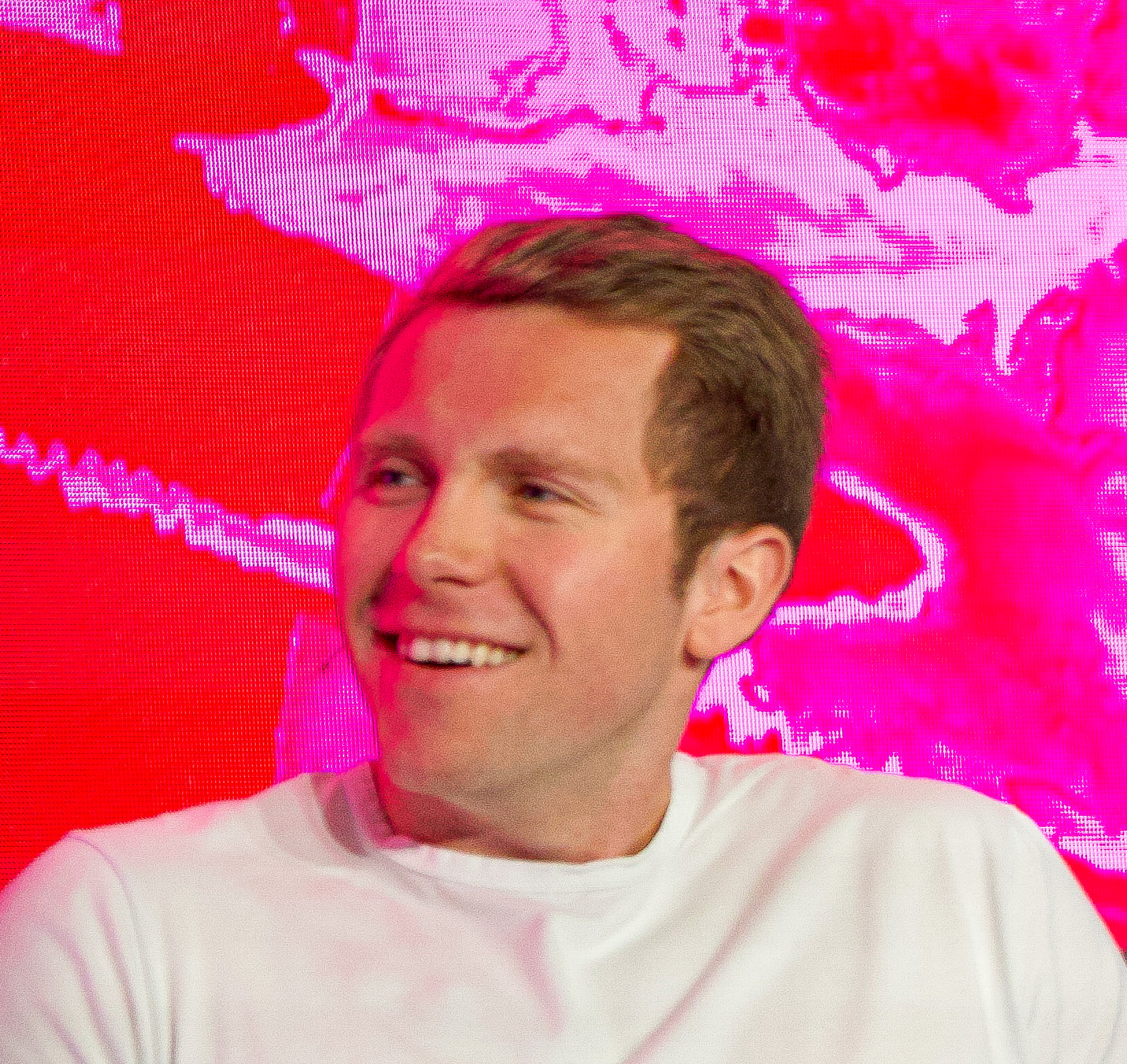
- Born: 22 June 1996 (age 30); London, England
- Occupation: Venture capitalist
- Known for: The Twenty Minute VC podcast

Harry Stebbings (born 1996) is an English podcaster and venture capitalist known for starting "The Twenty Minute VC" podcast. In 2020, he launched his own venture capital fund called 20VC.

== Early life ==
Stebbings was born in London on 22 June 1996. He was educated at Felsted School and Mander Portman Woodward. He enrolled at King's College London to study law but dropped out after four weeks.

== Career ==
Stebbings started The Twenty Minute VC podcast with $50 and not a single contact in the venture capital industry. The first episode was an interview with Guy Kawasaki, released on 10 January 2015.

In May 2017, Stebbings left his job at venture capital firm Atomico after six months working there.

Stebbings stepped down as partner at Stride.VC, a firm he co-founded with Fred Destin in 2018 with £100 million.

Stebbings launched his venture capital fund, 20VC fund, in May 2020. In June 2021, Stebbings raised a further US$140 million in funding. The fund focuses on investments in Europe and North America. One of its largest investments to date is in mobile games company Tripledot Studios. Other notable investments include Pachama, Nex Health, Sorare, Captions.ai, Linktree, Taxdoo, Linear, Merge, and Peec AI. As of 2024, the firm manages over $600 million in assets.

In October 2024, Stebbings raised $400 million for his third fund. The fund will be split between $125M for seed investments and $275M for Series A investments in tech companies.

== Recognition ==
In 2019, Stebbings was included on the Forbes 30 Under 30 in Europe list, in the finance category.
