= Rural sports (disambiguation) =

Rural sports may refer to:

- List of rural sports and games
- Rural Sports, 1713 book by John Gay
- Rural Sports, 1801 book by William Barker Daniel
