= 20VC =

Venture capital firm

- Type: Private
- Industry: Venture capital
- Founded: 2020; 6 years ago
- Founder: Harry Stebbings
- Headquarters: London, England, United Kingdom
- Key people: Harry Stebbings
- Products: Investments

20VC is a London-based venture capital firm founded in 2020 by Harry Stebbings. The firm invests in technology companies across stages, from early-stage to growth, with a focus on sectors including software, fintech, and artificial intelligence.

== History ==
Harry Stebbings founded 20VC in 2020 following the growth of his podcast, The Twenty Minute VC, which he launched in 2015. The firm’s first fund was reported to be approximately $8.3 million and focused on early-stage investments.

In 2021, 20VC raised additional capital totaling approximately $140 million across multiple funds, allowing the firm to expand its investment activities beyond seed-stage companies.

In 2024, the firm closed a $400 million fund, its largest to date, aimed primarily at investing in technology companies, including those based in Europe. The fund included backing from institutional investors and technology founders.

Alongside its primary funds, 20VC has supported the creation of smaller affiliated investment vehicles focused on specific operational areas such as growth, product, and sales.

== Investments ==
20VC investment include companies like: BeReal, Clubhouse, Hopin, Poolside AI, Linear, Merge, Captions.ai, Peec AI, Taxdoo, Sorare, and Linktree.
