= Cecil Kaye =

British Indian Army officer (1868–1935)

- Born: 27 May 1868; Madron, Cornwall, England
- Died: 5 March 1935 (aged 66); New Delhi, India
- Education: Winchester College
- Spouse: Margaret Sarah (´Daisy´) Bryson (m. 1905)
- Relatives: M. M. Kaye (daughter); John William Kaye (first cousin)
- Military career
- Allegiance: United Kingdom
- Branch: British Army; British Indian Army
- Service years: 1889–1925
- Rank: Lieutenant-Colonel
- Units: Derbyshire Regiment; Indian Staff Corps; 21st Punjabis; 20th Duke of Cambridge's Own Infantry (Brownlow's Punjabis)
- Commands: Department of Central Intelligence
- Conflicts: North-West Frontier; Boxer Rebellion; World War I

Lieutenant-Colonel Sir Cecil Kaye CSI CIE CBE (27 May 1868 – 5 March 1935) was an officer in the British Indian Army.

== Biography ==
Kaye was born in Madron, Cornwall, the son of William Kaye, of the Bengal Civil Service, and Jane Margaret (née Beckett). He came from a family with a strong tradition of seeking careers in the British civil or military service in India; he was a first cousin of the historian Sir John William Kaye.

In 1889, after attending Winchester College, he was commissioned as a second lieutenant in the 2nd Battalion, Derbyshire Regiment, receiving promotion to lieutenant on 1 November 1890. On 26 June 1892 Kaye was seconded for service with the Indian Staff Corps, later seeing active service at the North-West Frontier in 1897–1898, and being awarded the India Medal. He was promoted to captain on 6 March 1900, and served during the Boxer Rebellion in China in 1900–1901.

While at Tianjin he met Margaret Sarah Bryson, whom he married in 1905, having a son and two daughters, including M. M. Kaye. He was promoted to major in the 21st Punjabis on 6 March 1907. In 1908 Kaye was appointed deputy adjutant to the Quartermaster-General in the Intelligence Branch of the General Staff at Indian Army Headquarters in Simla. He was made a Companion of the Order of the Indian Empire (CIE) on 1 January 1913.

In August 1914, he was appointed Deputy Chief Censor, working closely with the Department of Criminal Intelligence, and gaining a reputation as a skilled cryptographer.

On 6 October 1914 he was promoted from major to temporary lieutenant-colonel in the 20th Duke of Cambridge's Own Infantry (Brownlow's Punjabis), and this was confirmed on 6 March 1915.

On 1 January 1917, he was appointed a Companion of the Order of the Star of India (CSI) in recognition of his "meritorious services ... in connection with the war", and was made a Commander of the Order of the British Empire (CBE) in 1919.

On 29 September 1919, he was appointed temporary Director of the Department of Central Intelligence, and this was confirmed on 7 May 1920. He retired from that post in 1924. He was awarded a knighthood on 1 January 1925, receiving his accolade from the King at Buckingham Palace on 12 February 1925. He retired from the Indian Army on 13 April 1925.

In 1925, he wrote Communism in India, in which he described the operations of the DCI against the Bolsheviks during his time in office. Kaye then served as a minister in the Indian princely state of Tonk until 1930. After his retirement he lived in Srinagar, and was a regular contributor to the journal Near East and India. He died of a heart attack at New Delhi on 5 March 1935.

== Bibliography ==
- Popplewell, Richard (May 2014). "Kaye, Sir Cecil". Oxford Dictionary of National Biography (online ed.). Oxford University Press. doi:10.1093/ref:odnb/53776. (Subscription, Wikipedia Library access or UK public library membership required.)
- "Kaye, Lt-Col. Sir Cecil". Who Was Who. A & C Black. April 2014.
