= Eric Edwards, Baron Chelmer =

The Right Honourable The Lord Chelmer MC
- Chelmer by Walter Bird, 1963

Member of the House of Lords Lord Temporal
- In office 31 January 1963 – 3 March 1997; Life Peerage

Personal details
- Born: 9 October 1914
- Died: 3 March 1997 (aged 82)
- Party: Conservative
- Education: University of London

Eric Cyril Boyd Edwards, Baron Chelmer MC, previously styled Sir Eric Edwards, (9 October 1914 – 3 March 1997) was an English solicitor and organiser for the Conservative Party. He was Chairman of the National Executive Committee of the National Union of Conservative and Unionist Associations from 1957 to 1965, and Joint Treasurer of the party from 1965 to 1977.

== Early life ==
Eric Edwards was the eldest son of Colonel C E Edwards DSO, a solicitor and Liberal councillor. He attended Felsted School, and gave up his early hope of becoming a diplomat to enter his father's firm of solicitors, after taking an LLB at the University of London. He joined the Essex Yeomanry, which in World War II became 147th (Essex Yeomanry) Regiment, Royal Horse Artillery. He fought in the invasion of France, winning a Military Cross in 1944, and gaining the rank of lieutenant-colonel. He was commanding officer of the Essex Yeomanry in 1945–6.

== Conservative Party ==
After the war, he and his father joined the Conservative Party. Having failed to be preselected as Parliamentary candidate for Southend, he thereafter served the party in a voluntary capacity, at the same time adding insurance and property interests to his legal career. With the support of Harold Macmillan, he rose to become deputy party chairman. He was knighted in the 1954 Birthday Honours. and had the honour conferred on him by the Queen on 6 July.

With Oliver Poole, he transformed party funding by setting a quota for subscription revenue from each constituency branch, with the results published at the annual party conference.

== House of Lords ==
On 31 January 1963 he was created Baron Chelmer, of Margaretting in the County of Essex, but never gave a maiden speech in the House of Lords, in keeping with the custom for party fund-raisers. He made 13 speeches in all. When Macmillan retired that year, he got The Lord Chelmer to sound out The Earl of Home as his successor, with the party split between Quintin Hogg and Rab Butler.

== Arms ==
Coat of arms of Eric Edwards, Baron Chelmer
Crest In front of a sun rising Or a bull's head and neck Gules armed Or. Escutcheon Sable a lion rampant Or on a chief Or two martlets Sable. Supporters Dexter a lion rampant Proper sinister a peacock in his pride Proper.

== Personal life ==
He married Enid Harvey in 1939; they had one son.

== Other interests ==
He was on the board of directors of several companies. He enjoyed sailing, especially catamarans, and was involved with music charities.
