= Lloyd Paternott =

English cricketer

Personal information
- Full name: Lloyd Christopher Paternott
- Born: 15 January 1992 (age 34); Watford, Hertfordshire, England
- Height: 6 ft 0 in (1.83 m)
- Batting: Right-handed
- Bowling: Right-arm medium

Domestic team information
- Years: Team
- 2013–2014: Hertfordshire
- 2014–2016: Oxford MCCU

Career statistics
Competition	First-class
Matches	6
Runs scored	160
Batting average	16.00
100s/50s	–/1
Top score	50
Catches/stumpings	4/–
- Source: Cricinfo, 5 July 2019

Lloyd Christopher Paternott (born 15 January 1992) is an English former first-class cricketer.

Paternott was born at Watford in January 1992. He was educated at Felsted School, before going up to Oxford Brookes University. While studying at Oxford, he made his debut in first-class cricket for Oxford MCCU against Nottinghamshire at Oxford in 2014, top-scoring in the Oxford first-innings with 50 runs, in a score 102 all out. He played first-class cricket for Oxford MCCU until 2016, making a total of six appearances. He scored 160 runs in these matches, with his debut fifty his highest first-class score. In addition to playing first-class cricket, Paternott also played minor counties cricket for Hertfordshire in 2013 and 2014, making a single appearance in the Minor Counties Championship scoring 111 on debut and two appearances in the MCCA Knockout Trophy.

From 2014-2016, Paternott represented Northamptonshire's 2XI. During his first year with the county he went through a purple patch of form averaging 127 in 50 overs cricket and 39 in the 3 day format.

Paternott's mother is of Ugandan descent, meaning he is eligible to represent Uganda. The Uganda Cricket Association sought to seek approval for him to play for Uganda in the 2017 ICC World Cricket League Division Three, but did not seek clearance in time. He toured Qatar in 2018, but did not feature for Uganda in the 2018 ICC World Cricket League Division Four due to a dislocated knee in the first warm-up game. In July 2019, Paternott was one of twenty-five players named in the Ugandan training squad, ahead of the Cricket World Cup Challenge League fixtures in Hong Kong which was postponed due to political reasons.
