= Ernest Hall (cricketer) =

English cricketer

Personal information
- Born: 29 April 1851; Newmarket, Suffolk, England
- Died: 3 March 1936 (aged 84); Botley, Hampshire, England
- Batting: Right-handed
- Role: Wicket-keeper
- Relatives: Patrick Hall (son)

Domestic team information
- Years: Team
- 1880–1886: Hampshire

Career statistics
Competition	First-class
Matches	11
Runs scored	198
Batting average	10.42
100s/50s	–/–
Top score	22
Catches/stumpings	11/3
- Source: Cricinfo, 9 January 2010

Ernest Hall (29 April 1851 – 3 March 1936) was an English first-class cricketer and surveyor

The son of the painter Harry Hall, he was born at Newmarket in April 1851. He was educated at Felsted School, where he played for the cricket eleven. He later made his debut in first-class cricket for Hampshire against the Marylebone Cricket Club at Lord's in 1880. He played first-class cricket for Hampshire until 1886, making eleven appearances. Playing as a wicket-keeper, he took 11 catches and made three stumpings. As a batsman, he scored 198 runs at an average of 10.42, with a highest score of 22. Hampshire lost their first-class status following the 1885 season, with Hall continuing to play second-class matches for the county. Outside of cricket, he was a Chartered Surveyor and a fellow of the Royal Institution of Chartered Surveyors, as well as being a well-known auctioneer and estate agent in the Portsmouth area. Hall died in March 1936 at Botley, Hampshire. His son, Patrick, was also a first-class cricketer and Chartered Surveyor.
