= Harry Hall (painter) =

British painter (c. 1814–1882)

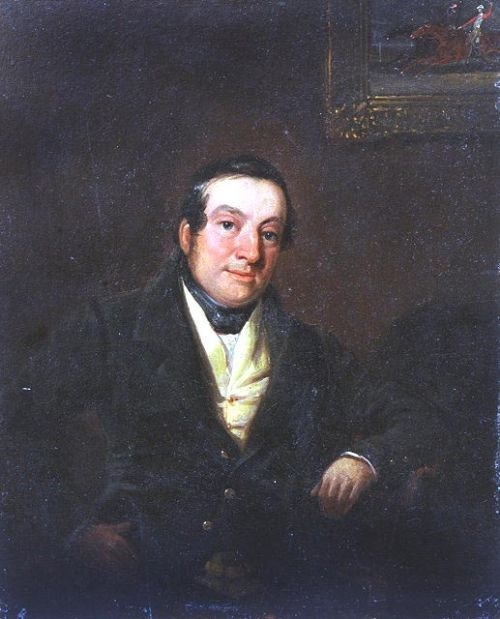
Self portrait of Hall

Henry (Harry) Hall (c. 1814 – 22 April 1882) was an English equestrian painter, whose works were in demand by horse owners. His output was prolific and he was the foremost racehorse portraitist of his time: his style has been described as being "strikingly modern... when compared with many of his contemporaries". He also produced other types of portraits and shooting scenes.

== Career ==
Hall was born in Cambridge towards the middle of the second decade of the 19th century (dates of 1813, 1814, 1815, and 1816 are to be found in biographies).

He first appeared as an artist at Tattersalls, working on a number of their publications; initially British Racehorses and The Sporting Review. He graduated to become chief artist of The Field. He produced a great volume of work, much of which was engraved. The Sporting Magazine published 114 plates by Hall. He also worked for The Illustrated London News.

Hall began life as a portrait painter and exhibited at the Royal Academy from 1838, however his career was established on his first equestrian work being given at the Royal Academy in 1845 when he exhibited a Suffolk cob from Newmarket.

He worked from his home, Willoughby House, Newmarket, from 1846 and frequently across England and Europe. He worked continuously, without need for exhibiting, from 1860.

== Death ==
Having lately returned from a long commission in Chantilly, France, he returned home to Willoughby House, Newmarket and died there of paralysis.

== Family ==
His son was the cricketer Ernest Hall; his grandson, Patrick Hall, was also a cricketer.

Harry Hall

"Saucebox with Wells Up" (1855) by Henry Hall. Many paintings of Hall's name the horse - this one is less usual in that the jockey is also named. Saucebox won the Lincoln Handicap in 1855.

Kingcraft, Winner of Derby Stakes (1877)
by Henry Hall. As there is no rider, this is an equine portrait rather than an equestrian portrait.

== See also ==
- Horses in art
