= Eric Morris (cricketer) =

English cricketer & soldier (1890–1966)

Personal information
- Full name: Eric Wells Morris
- Born: 8 December 1890; Bandra, Bombay Presidency, British India
- Died: 22 May 1966 (aged 75); Kensington, London, England
- Batting: Unknown
- Bowling: Unknown

Domestic team information
- Years: Team
- 1928/29: Europeans
- 1936/37: Bihar

Career statistics
Competition	First-class
Matches	2
Runs scored	46
Batting average	11.50
100s/50s	–/–
Top score	20
Balls bowled	150
Wickets	1
Bowling average	75.00
5 wickets in innings	–
10 wickets in match	–
Best bowling	1/75
Catches/stumpings	1/–
- Source: ESPNcricinfo, 18 November 2023

Eric Wells Morris DSO (8 December 1890 – 22 May 1966) was an English first-class cricketer and an officer in both the British Army and the British Indian Army.

The son of the Irishman Dermot Morris, he was born in British India at Bandara in December 1890. He was educated at Felsted School, before proceeding to the Royal Military College, Sandhurst. He was commissioned into the Connaught Rangers as a second lieutenant in March 1911. He served in the First World War, being promoted to lieutenant a month and a half into the conflict, with promotion to captain following in October 1915. Following the war, he was awarded the Distinguished Service Order in the 1919 Birthday Honours, at which point he was seconded to the Cheshire Regiment. Morris later joined the British Indian Army in March 1928.

A year later, in March 1929, he made his debut in first-class cricket for the Europeans cricket team against the Muslims at Lahore in the 1928–29 Lahore Tournament. In September 1929, he was confirmed in the rank of captain in the British Indian Army. He vacated his appointment in India as an instructor at the Indian Army Service Corps (IASC) Training Establishment in June 1932, at which point he held the rank of major. He was reappointed an instructor at IASC Training Establishment at Chaklala in September 1933, with promotion to lieutenant colonel following in September 1935. In December 1936, he made a second appearance in first-class cricket, this time for Bihar against Bengal at Calcutta in the 1936–37 Ranji Trophy. In his two first-class matches, he scored 46 runs with a highest score of 20, in addition to taking a single wicket. After a number of appointments as an instructor, Morris retired from active service in August 1939. He later died in England at Kensington in May 1966.
