= John Smedley (British Army officer) =

Brigadier John Edward Bruce Smedley CVO (born 1946) is a former Private Secretary to the Earl and Countess of Wessex, who now serves as chairman of the International Golf Charity and International Golf for Youth.

== Life ==
Educated at Felsted School, where he was a scholar becoming head boy, Smedley read Economics at the University of Reading before being commissioned into the Royal Tank Regiment as one of the first university cadetship officers. Throughout his regimental service he served with 3rd Royal Tank Regiment (the Armoured Farmers), mainly in Germany with tours in Northern Ireland and Cyprus. He was ADC to Lieutenant General Sir Allan Taylor on staff tours in Hong Kong with the Gurkha Brigade and the Ministry of Defence. After attending the Joint Service Defence College at Greenwich he became Commander UNFICYP Support Regiment before returning to the Staff at HQ British Army of the Rhine (BAOR) as Chief G3 Training. On promotion to Colonel he became Assistant Chief of Staff G4 HQ BAOR for a year, then Commander Armoured Recce HQ ACE Rapid Reaction Corps (ARRC) for year and latterly the last Chief of Staff of the Army Staff College at Camberley. Promoted Brigadier he served as Deputy Commander HQ 1st (UK) Armoured Division in Germany.

Upon his retirement from the Army, Smedley was appointed Private Secretary to the Earl and Countess of Wessex serving from January 2002 until April 2014, and again from November 2018 until April 2019.

Admitted a Freeman of the Worshipful Company of Haberdashers (of which Prince Edward serves on the Court of Assistants), Smedley remains an Equerry to TRH the Duke and Duchess of Edinburgh. He also serves as Chairman of Chitterne Cricket Club, as well as of the International Golf Charity and International Golf for Youth Ltd.

Appointed Lieutenant of the Royal Victorian Order in the 2010 New Year Honours, he was promoted Commander of the Royal Victorian Order on 13 March 2014.

Smedley married Lavinia Lane in 1976, having two sons.
