= Chris Huntington (cricketer) =

English cricketer

Personal information
- Full name: Christopher James Huntington
- Born: 29 March 1987 (age 39); Chelmsford, Essex, England
- Batting: Left-handed
- Bowling: Right-arm medium

Domestic team information
- Years: Team
- 2006–2007: Cambridge UCCE

Career statistics
Competition	First-class
Matches	5
Runs scored	111
Batting average	13.87
100s/50s	–/–
Top score	40
Catches/stumpings	–/–
- Source: Cricinfo, 25 August 2020

Christopher James Huntington (born 29 March 1987) is an English former first-class cricketer.

Huntington was born at Chelmsford in March 1987. He was educated at Felsted School before going up to Anglia Ruskin University. While studying at Anglia Ruskin, he played first-class cricket for Cambridge UCCE in 2006–07, making five appearances. (Note: Cambridge UCCE differed from Cambridge University Cricket Club in that it was open to students at Anglia Ruskin University, whereas Cambridge University Cricket Club is exclusively for students of the constituent colleges of the University of Cambridge.) Huntington scored 111 runs in his five matches, at an average of 13.87 and a high score of 40.
