= Cornelius Walford =

English writer on insurance (1827–1885)

Cornelius Walford (1827–1885), was an English writer on insurance.

Walford, born in Curtain Road, London, on 2 April 1827, was the eldest of five sons of Cornelius Walford (d. 1883) of Park House Farm, near Coggeshall, Essex, who married Mary Amelia Osborn of Pentonville. He is said to have been for a short time at Felsted School. At the age of fifteen he became clerk to Mr. Pattisson, solicitor at Witham, where he acquired much experience in the tenure and rating of land. He was appointed assistant secretary of the Witham building society, and, having in early life acquired a knowledge of shorthand, he acted as local correspondent of the Essex Standard. About 1848 he settled at Witham as insurance inspector and agent.

Walford was in 1857 elected an associate, and on a later date a fellow, of the Institute of Actuaries. About 1857 he joined the Statistical Society, and was for some time on its council. He published in parts, and anonymously, in 1857 his Insurance Guide and Handbook, which was pirated and had a large sale in America (2nd edit. 1867, with his name on the title-page). In 1858 he was admitted a student of the Middle Temple, and was called to the bar in Michaelmas term 1860. It was his intention to practise at the parliamentary bar, and he joined Messrs. Chadwick and Adamson; but the connection was soon dissolved, though he continued to give legal opinions on insurance questions.

About this time Walford became connected with the Accidental Death Insurance Company. Of its successor, the Accident Insurance Company, he was a director from 1866 until his death, and for a year or two he acted as manager. About 1862 he was a director of the East London Bank. In that year he was made manager of the Unity Fire and Life Office, but could not succeed in resuscitating it, and in 1863 the business was taken over by the Briton office, Walford being appointed its liquidator. In 1861 he paid the first of many visits to the United States. He brought out in 1870 an Insurance Year Book. In the latter year he was appointed manager of the New York Insurance Company for Europe. His great literary labour was his Insurance Cyclopædia, a compilation of immense labour, expected to occupy ten large octavo volumes. The first volume was dated 1871; the fifth, and last complete, volume came out in 1878, and each of them contained about six hundred pages (see The Times, 2 January 1878). One further part only was issued, concluding with an essay on 'Hereditary Diseases'; but large materials were left for the remaining volumes.

In 1875 Walford became a fellow of the Historical Society; in 1881 he was elected a vice-president, and he was its vice-chairman during the quarrels that all but led to its disruption. From 1877 to 1881 he read papers before it—the most important of his contributions being an 'Outline History of the Hanseatic League,' reprinted from volume ix. in 1881 for private circulation. He continued his addresses to the Institute of Actuaries and the Statistical Society, two of his papers on 'The Famines of the World Past and Present,' which he read before the last society, being reprinted in 1879. The article on 'Famines' in the subsequent edition of the 'Encyclopædia Britannica' was also from his pen. He was a member of the executive council of international law, and read papers to the members at their meeting in London in 1879.

Walford had projected in 1877 A New General Catalogue of English Literature, and in that and succeeding years dangled the project before the Library Association. But the enterprise collapsed with the reprint of his paper on 'Some Practical Points in its Preparation.' An undertaking more feasible in scope was his proposed Cyclopædia of Periodical Literature of Great Britain and Ireland from the Earliest Period, which he purposed compiling in conjunction with Dr. Westby-Gibson. In 1883 he issued an outline of the scheme. But no part of the collections was published.

In 1879 Walford issued a History of Gilds, reprinted from volume v. of the 'Insurance Cyclopædia,' and in 1881 his paper before the Statistical Society on 'Deaths from Accident, Negligence, &c.' was published separately. He printed for private circulation in 1882 a treatise on Kings' Briefs: their Purposes and History, and began in the same year in the Antiquarian Magazine an expansion of his History of Gilds. These papers were not finished at the time of his death, but the complete volume, entitled Gilds: their Origin, Constitution, Objects, and Later History, was published by his widow in 1888. In 1883 he brought out a book on Fairs Past and Present, and in 1884 A Statistical Chronology of Plagues and Pestilences.

Walford, who manifested a lifelong interest in shorthand, became, at the close of 1881, president of the newly founded Shorthand Society. In the autumn of 1884 he revisited, for his health's sake, the United States and Canada, and attended three shorthand conventions. In December 1884 he gained the Samuel Brown prize by his paper at the Institute of Actuaries on the ‘History of Life Insurance.’ He lived in London in two adjoining houses in Belsize Park Gardens, where he had gathered around him a large library, and he died there on 28 September 1885, leaving a widow (his third wife) and nine children, three sons and six daughters, by his first and second wives. He was buried at Woking cemetery on 3 Oct A catalogue raisonné of a portion of his library was printed in May 1886 for circulation among his friends (Notes and Queries, 5 June 1886, p. 460). His collections on insurance were purchased by the New York Equitable Life Insurance Company. The rest of his library and the manuscripts for the completion of his 'Insurance Cyclopædia' perished in a fire from lightning at his widow's house near Sevenoaks (Standard, 4 September 1889).
