= Martin Olley =

English cricketer (1963–2025)

Personal information
- Full name: Martin William Charles Olley
- Born: 27 November 1963; Romford, Essex, England
- Died: 28 June 2025 (aged 61)
- Batting: Right-handed
- Role: Wicketkeeper

Domestic team information
- Years: Team
- 1991–1994: Cambridgeshire
- 1988: Middlesex
- 1984–1990: Hertfordshire
- 1983: Northamptonshire

Career statistics
| Competition | FC | LA |
|---|---|---|
| Matches | 5 | 8 |
| Runs scored | 77 | 90 |
| Batting average | 15.40 | 18.00 |
| 100s/50s | 0/0 | 0/0 |
| Top score | 27* | 20* |
| Catches/stumpings | 12/– | 4/– |
- Source: Cricinfo, 28 November 2010

Martin William Charles Olley (27 November 1963 – 28 June 2025) was an English cricketer. Olley was a right-handed batsman who played primarily as a wicketkeeper. He was born at Romford, Essex, and educated at Felsted School in Essex.

== Biography ==
Olley made his first-class debut for Northamptonshire against Cambridge University in 1983. This was his only major appearance for the county.

The following season he made his Minor Counties Championship debut for Hertfordshire in 1985 against Bedfordshire. He represented the county in Minor Counties Championship matches from 1985 to 1990, playing his final Championship match for the county against Norfolk. He made his MCCA Knockout Trophy debut in 1985 against Bedfordshire. He played in the Trophy for Hertfordshire from 1985 to 1990, with his final match for them coming against Bedfordshire. It was while playing for Hertfordshire that he made his debut in List A cricket. This came against Worcestershire in the 1985 NatWest Trophy. From 1985 to 1989, he represented the county in 5 List A matches, the last of which came against Nottinghamshire in the 1989 NatWest Trophy.

While still playing for Hertfordshire, Olley played 4 first-class matches for Middlesex in 1988, the last of which came against Hampshire. These matches brought a close to his first-class, a career in which he scored 77 runs at a batting average of 15.40, with a high score of 27*. While behind the stumps he took 12 catches.

Following the end of the 1990 season, he joined Cambridgeshire, making his Minor Counties Championship debut against Suffolk. Olley represented the county in Minor Counties Championship matches from 1991 to 1994, playing his final one against Staffordshire. His MCCA Knockout Trophy debut for the county came in 1991 against Lincolnshire. Olley played 3 further Trophy matches for the county from 1991 to 1993, the last of which came against Bedfordshire.

Olley also played List A cricket for Cambridgeshire when they were permitted to take part in the domestic one-day tournament featuring the first-class counties. His debut in that format for the county came against Kent in the 1991 NatWest Trophy. From 1991 to 1994, he represented the county in 2 further List A matches against Northamptonshire in the 1992 NatWest Trophy and Hampshire in the 1994 NatWest Trophy.

Olley died on 28 June 2025, aged 61.
