= Chris Townsend (cricketer) =

English educator and cricketer

Personal information
- Full name: Christopher James Townsend
- Born: 12 January 1972 (age 54); Wokingham, Berkshire, England
- Batting: Right-handed
- Role: Wicket-keeper

Domestic team information
- Years: Team
- 1992–1995: Oxford University
- 2000: Marylebone Cricket Club

Career statistics
Competition	First-class
Matches	23
Runs scored	159
Batting average	12.23
100s/50s	–/–
Top score	27
Balls bowled	0
Wickets	–
Bowling average	–
5 wickets in innings	–
10 wickets in match	–
Best bowling	–
Catches/stumpings	35/5
- Source: Cricinfo, 21 December 2018

Christopher James Townsend (born 1 September 1972) is an English educator and former first-class cricketer.

Born at Wokingham, Townsend studied classics at Brasenose College, Oxford. While at Brasenose he made his debut in first-class cricket for Oxford University against Middlesex at Oxford in 1992. He played first-class cricket for Oxford on 22 occasions until 1995, playing his final match against Cambridge University at Lord's. He scored 141 runs in these matches, and in his capacity as wicket-keeper he took 34 catches and made five stumpings. After graduating from Oxford, Townsend moved into education. He later played a first-class match for the Marylebone Cricket Club against New Zealand A at Oxford in 2000.

He was appointed the headmaster of Felsted School in March 2015, replacing Dr. Mike Walker.
