= Patrick Hall (cricketer) =

English cricketer

Personal information
- Full name: Patrick Martin Hall
- Born: 14 March 1894; Portsmouth, Hampshire, England
- Died: 5 August 1941 (aged 47); Fareham, Hampshire, England
- Batting: Right-handed
- Relatives: Ernest Hall (father)

Domestic team information
- Years: Team
- 1919: Oxford University
- 1919–1926: Hampshire

Career statistics
Competition	First-class
Matches	14
Runs scored	292
Batting average	13.27
100s/50s	1/1
Top score	101
Catches/stumpings	3/–
- Source: Cricinfo, 13 February 2010

Patrick Martin Hall MC (14 March 1894 — 5 August 1941) was an English first-class cricketer, soldier, and botanist. Hall was educated at Winchester College and Oriel College, Oxford. His studies there were interrupted by the First World War, during which he was awarded the Military Cross. Following the war, he played first-class cricket for Oxford University and Hampshire, in addition to becoming a respected botanist.

== Early life and WWI service ==
The son of the cricketer Ernest Hall, he was born at Portsmouth in March 1894. His grandfather was the painter Harry Hall. He was educated at Winchester College, before matriculating to Oriel College, Oxford. However, the outbreak of the First World War in July 1914 interrupted his studies. Hall served in the war with the 1st Wessex Artillery, being commissioned as a second lieutenant in September 1914, with promotion to lieutenant following in June 1916. In October 1917, he was made both an acting captain and major, ranks he relinquished in February 1918 when he ceased to be employed as second-in-command of a battery. Hall was awarded the Military Cross in February 1918. In June 1918, he was placed on the retired list, but was restored to the active list in November 1918.

== First-class cricket and botany ==
After the end of the war, Hall resumed his studies at Oxford. There he joined the Oxford University Cricket Club, making his debut in first-class cricket for the club against the Free Foresters at Oxford in 1919; he made a first innings century in the match, with a score of 101. He made two further first-class appearances that season for Oxford against Sussex and Surrey, but did not gain a blue. In the 1919 summer break from Oxford, Hall made two first-class appearances for Hampshire in the County Championship. He made two further appearances in the 1920 County Championship and played against Oxford University in 1921. He would make three further appearances in the 1923 County Championship, before playing his final matches in the 1926 County Championship against Kent and Somerset. In fourteen appearances in first-class cricket, Hall scored 292 runs at an average of 13.27, with his century on first-class debuting remaining the only occasion he made three-figures.

After graduating from Oxford, Hall became a chartered surveyor and land agent in the Fareham firm Hall, Pain and Foster. He was admitted fellow of the Royal Institution of Chartered Surveyors in 1920. Hall was a well known botanist, particularly in South East England. His interest in botany first began when he was at Winchester College, when he picked violets and submitted them to the British authority on the group. He maintained a valuable botanical collection of and established the foundations for much more incisive methods of handling plant records that came into use in the years that followed by setting aside the methods established by George Claridge Druce as untrustworthy. He later edited the Botanical Society and Exchange Club's Report from 1936 to 1941. He was also a fellow of the Linnean Society of London. Hall died suddenly at Fareham on 5 August 1941, following a breakdown in his health.
