= Patrick Redmond =

English author

Patrick Redmond (born 1966) is an English author of psychological thrillers; typical themes include insanity, secrets and death. He attended Felsted School, then studied law at Leicester University and British Columbia in Vancouver. Before becoming a writer, he worked for eight years as a solicitor in London.

== Bibliography ==
- The Wishing Game (1999), also published as Something Dangerous
- The Puppet Show (2000)
- Apple of My Eye (2003)
- All She Ever Wanted (2006)
- The Replacement (2014)
- The Night Visitor (2018)
