= Walter Hamilton (VC) =

Recipient of the Victoria Cross

Walter Richard Pollock Hamilton VC
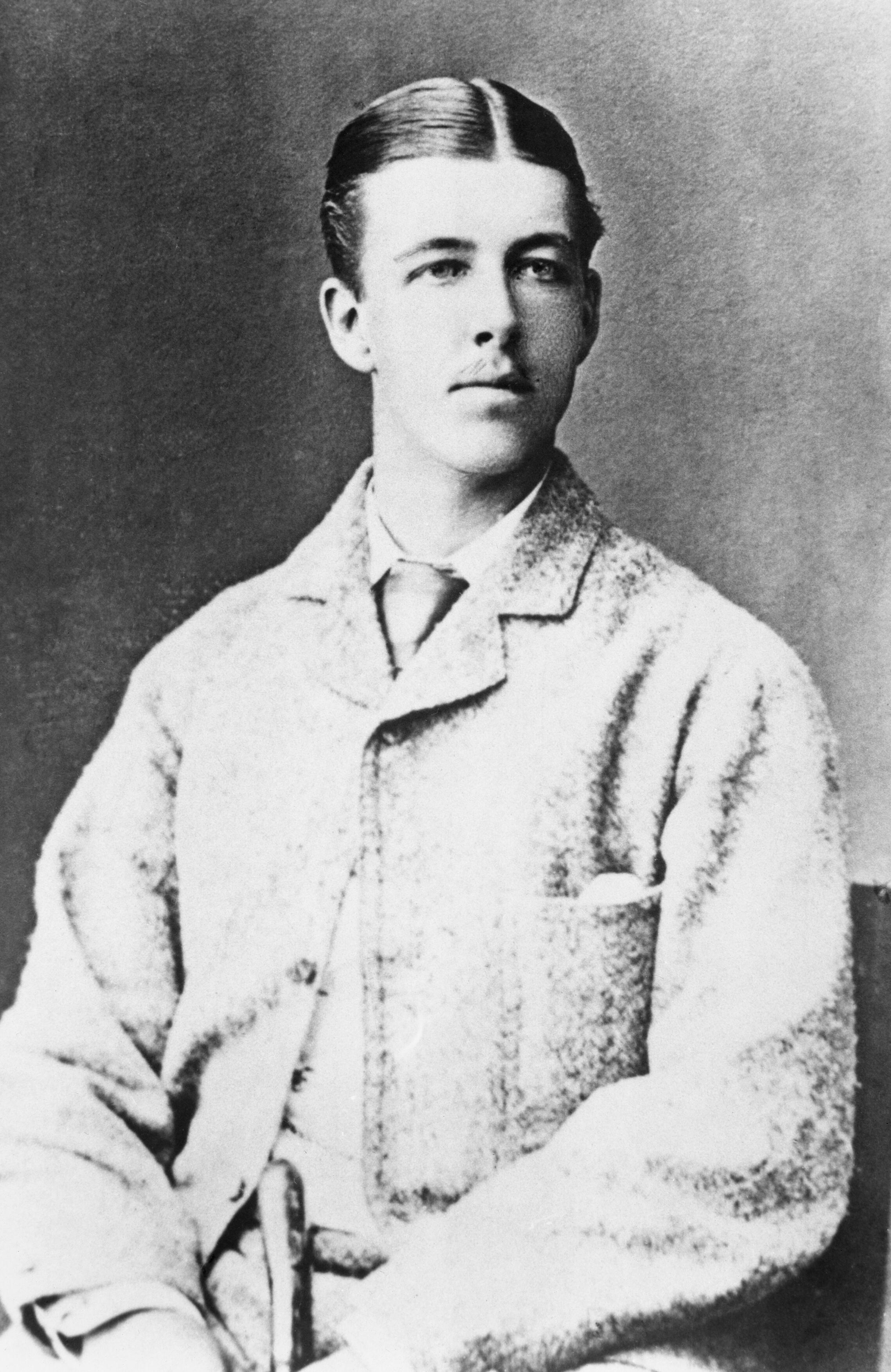
- Walter Richard Pollock Hamilton VC (IWM)
- Born: 18 August 1856; Inistioge, County Kilkenny
- Died: 3 September 1879 (aged 23); Kabul, Afghanistan
- Military career
- Allegiance: United Kingdom
- Branch: British Indian Army
- Service years: 1874–1879
- Rank: Lieutenant
- Units: 70th Regiment of Foot; Bengal Staff Corps and Corps of Guides
- Conflicts: Second Anglo-Afghan War †
- Awards: Victoria Cross

Walter Richard Pollock Hamilton VC (18 August 1856 – 3 September 1879) was a British Indian Army officer and recipient of the Victoria Cross, the highest and most prestigious award for gallantry in the face of the enemy that can be awarded to British and Commonwealth forces. He is featured in M. M. Kaye's epic novel The Far Pavilions.

== Details ==
Hamilton was a great nephew of General Sir George Pollock who led the Army of Retribution in the First Afghan War. He was educated at Felsted. Hamilton was 22 years old, and a lieutenant in the Staff Corps and Corps of Guides, Indian Army during the Second Afghan War when the following deed took place on 2 April 1879 at Futtehabad, Afghanistan, for which he was awarded the VC:

For conspicuous gallantry during the action at Futtehabad on the 2nd April, 1879, in leading on the Guide Cavalry in a charge against very superior numbers of the enemy, and particularly at a critical moment when his Commanding Officer (Major Wigram Battye) fell, Lieutenant Hamilton, then the only Officer left with the Regiment, assumed command and cheered on his men to avenge Major Battye's death. In this charge Lieutenant Hamilton, seeing Sowar Dowlut Ram down, and attacked by three of the enemy, whilst entangled with his horse (which had been killed) rushed to the rescue, and followed by a few of his men cut down all three and saved the life of Sowar Dowlut Ram.

The scene of Hamilton's death was the Bala Hissar, an enclosure within the city of Kabul. He commanded a small force of 20 Cavalry and 50 Infantry, all from the Corps of Guides, which formed an escort for Sir Louis Cavagnari the Envoy who was to set up the Residency in Kabul following the Treaty of Gandamak. After a riot by mutinous Afghan troops, who were demanding arrears of pay, the Residency was attacked on 3 September 1879. Fierce fighting took place between the Guides and the attackers, during which Cavagnari and all the Guides were killed.

On 15 May 1879, six weeks after the action at Futtehabad, the Government in India forwarded a Victoria Cross recommendation for Hamilton to London which on 6 August determined that his act was not covered by the Victoria Cross regulations. There was a change of heart when the Secretary of State for India, Lord Cranbrook, noted that Hamilton's actions were similar to those of Captain John Cook and Lieutenant Reginald Hart who had both been awarded the Victoria Cross two months earlier. By this stage Hamilton had been killed at Kabul on 3 September and in order to avoid the precedent of seeming to approve a posthumous award the submission to the Queen on 28 September was backdated to 1 September 1879. The award was gazetted on 7 October 1879, the 12th Victoria Cross recommendation approved after the death of the recipient.

== Memorials ==
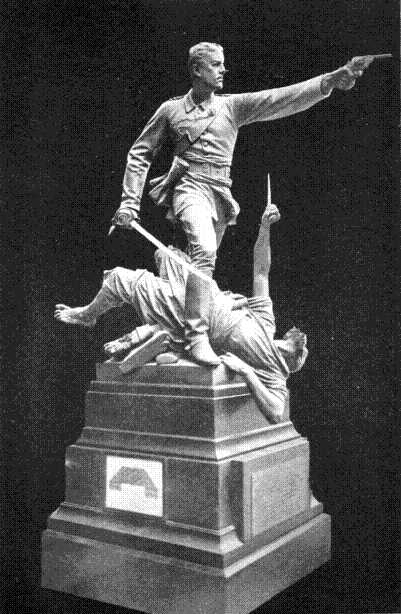
Statue commemorating Hamilton, in the National Army Museum

A slightly over-life-size statue of Hamilton striding over an Afghan threatening him with a knife was produced in bronze-painted plaster by Charles Bell Birch in Dublin in around 1880. It is now on display in the National Army Museum, Chelsea, as is a plaque to him (set up in the Punjab Frontier Force Chapel, then in the sanctum crypt of St. Lukes Chapel, Chelsea).

== In the media ==
Walter Hamilton is a character in the novel "The Far Pavilions", in the HBO-miniseries adaption he was portrayed by Benedict Taylor.
