= John William Kaye =

British military historian (1814–1876)

Sir John William Kaye KCSI FRS
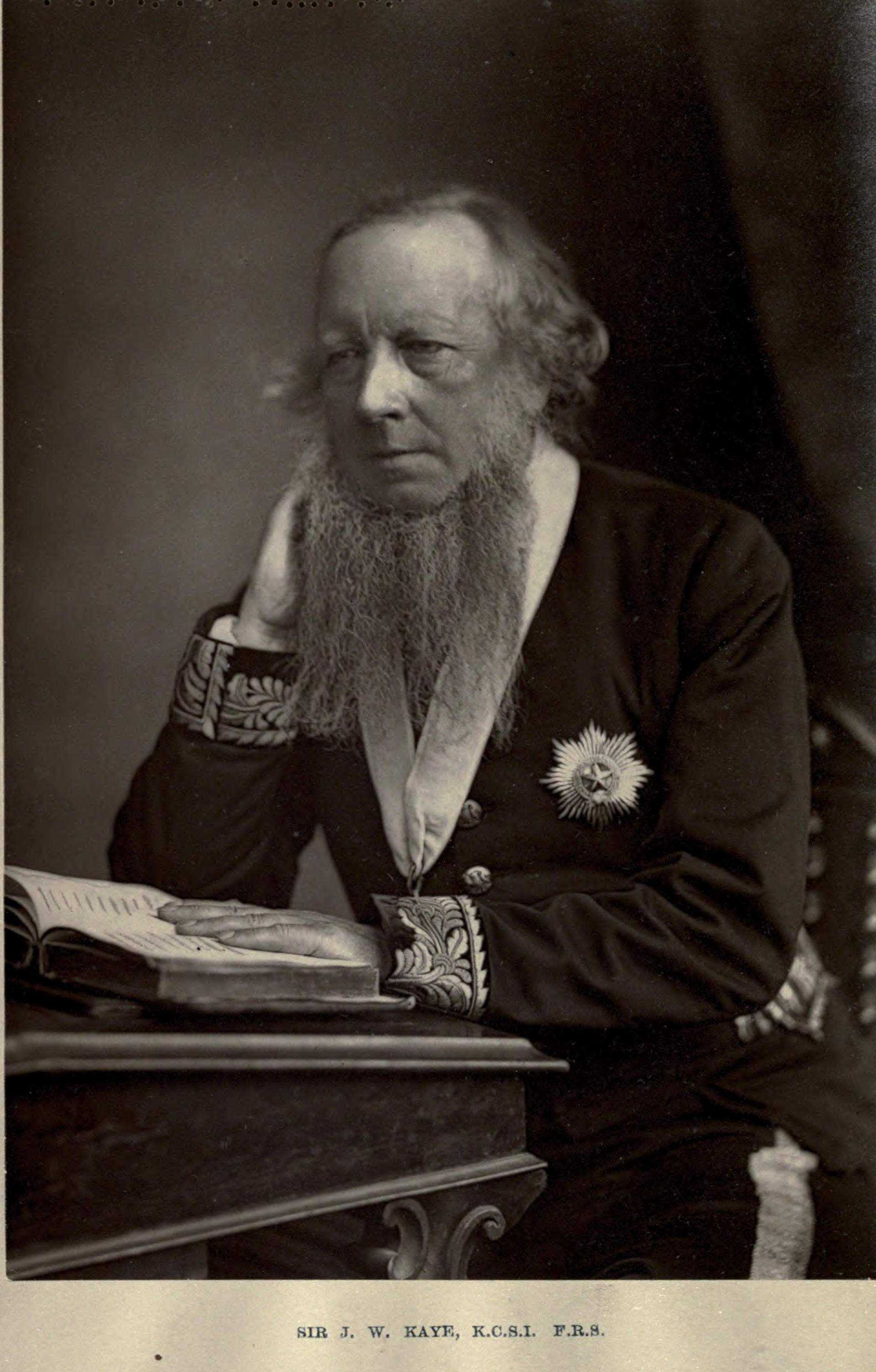
- Born: 3 June 1814; London, England
- Died: 24 July 1876 (aged 62); London, England
- Notable work: History of the War in Afghanistan, A History of the Sepoy War in India
- Relatives: Sir Cecil Kaye (first cousin), M. M. Kaye (novelist, first cousin once removed)

Sir John William Kaye KCSI FRS (3 June 1814 – 24 July 1876) was a British military historian, civil servant and army officer in India. His major works on military history include a three-volume work on The History of the Sepoy War in India. This work was revised later by George Bruce Malleson and published in six volumes in 1890 as Kaye and Malleson's History of the Indian Mutiny.

== Biography ==
The second son of Charles Kaye, a solicitor, and Eliza, daughter of Hugh Atkins, he was born in London on 3 June 1814 and baptized on 30 June 1814. He was educated at Eton College (1823–1826) and at the Royal Military College, Addiscombe (1831–1832).

From 1832 to 1841 he was an officer in the Bengal Artillery commissioned on 14 December 1832 as a Second-Lieutenant and on 19 August 1840 promoted to Lieutenant. During his time in the Army he began following literary pursuits both in India and in Britain.

In 1839 he married Mary Catherine (1813–1893), daughter of Thomas Puckle of Surrey. He resigned his commission in the army on 1 April 1841 and began to write for newspapers such as the Bengal Hurkaru, which he edited. In 1844 he started the Calcutta Review and contributed about 50 articles to it while also writing a novel based in Afghanistan.

In 1845 Kaye returned to England to follow a professional literary career. He worked on his History of the War in Afghanistan, an account of the First Anglo-Afghan War. The book was well received: John Clark Marshman regarded it as "the most interesting of all works which have hitherto appeared on British Indian history".

Kaye entered the Home Civil Service of the East India Company in 1856. As John Stuart Mill was promoted to the post of Examiner of Indian correspondence, Kaye succeeded him as Political Assistant in the Examiner Department at East India House. During this time, he wrote the History of the Sepoy War in India, his history of the Indian Rebellion of 1857. It is considered a "well-ordered and comprehensive narrative". This work was later revised and continued by George Bruce Malleson as Kaye and Malleson's History of the Indian Mutiny and published in six volumes. It was completed in 1890. The Oxford Dictionary of National Biography considers Kaye's History of the Sepoy War in India still to be a standard work.

When in 1858 the government of India was transferred to the British crown, Kaye succeeded as Secretary in the Political and Secret Department of the Office of the Secretary of State for India. In 1866 he became a Fellow of the Royal Society. In the 1871 Birthday Honours he was made a Knight Commander of the Order of the Star of India (KCSI).

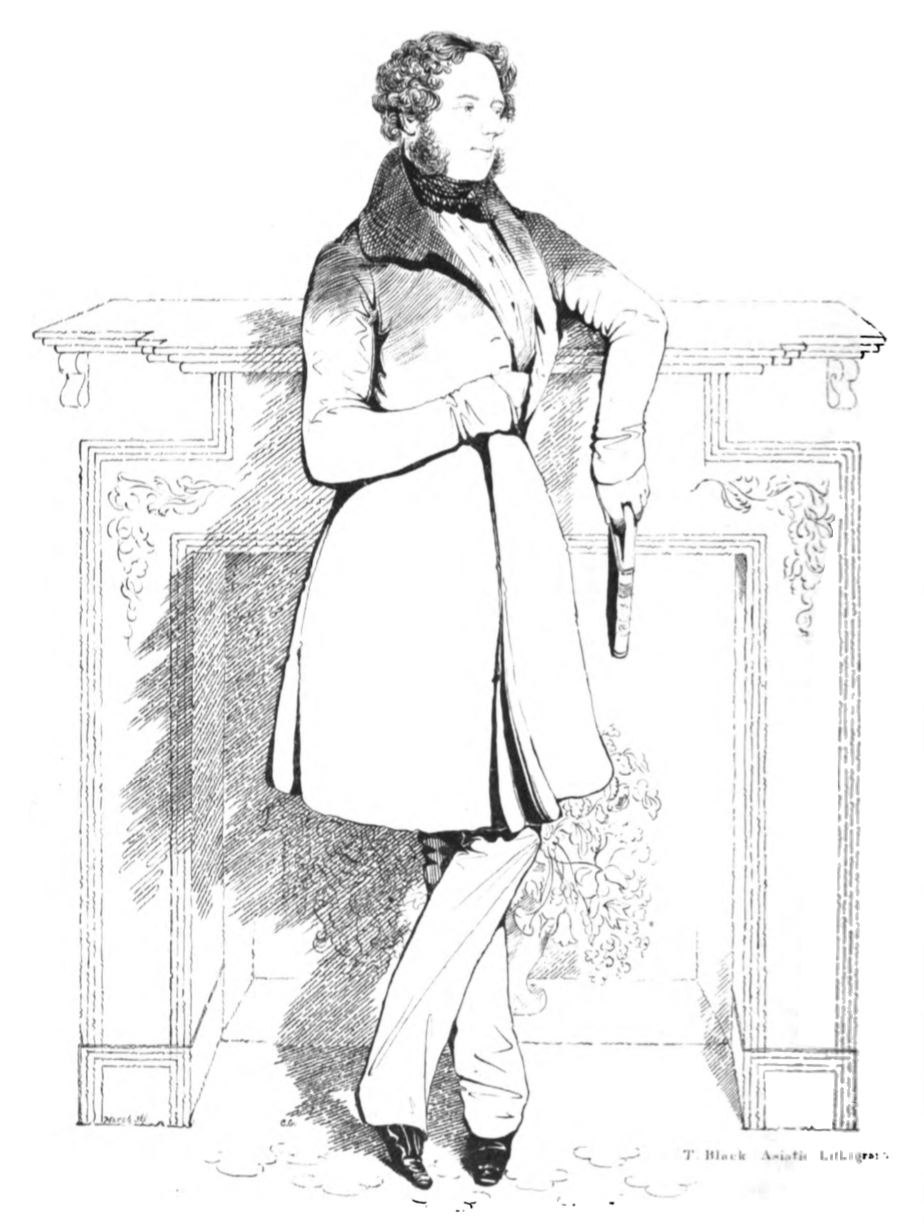
Pen sketch of John William Kaye by Colesworthey Grant, c. 1838

After retiring from the India Office in 1874 due to ill health, he died in London at his home at Rose Hill on 24 July 1876. An obituary in the Athenaeum praised him as a "household word in the East".

== Published works ==
- Kaye, John William (1844). Peregrine Pultuney: Or, Life in India. Vol. I. London: John Mortimer. A novel in three volumes, published anonymously.
- ————————— (1844). Peregrine Pultuney: Or, Life in India. Vol. II. London: John Mortimer.
- ————————— (1844). Peregrine Pultuney: Or, Life in India. Vol. III. London: John Mortimer.
- ————————— (1846). Long Engagements: A Tale of the Affghan Rebellion. London: Chapman and Hall. A novel in one volume, published anonymously.
- ————————— (1851). History of the War in Afghanistan (1 ed.). London: Richard Bentley.
  - Kaye, John William (1874). History of the War in Afghanistan. Vol. I (3 ed.). London: Richard Bentley.
  - ————————— (1874). History of the War in Afghanistan. Vol. II (3 ed.). London: Richard Bentley.
  - ————————— (1874). History of the War in Afghanistan. Vol. III (3 ed.). London: Richard Bentley.
- ————————— (1853). The Administration of the East India Company: A History of Indian Progress. London: Richard Bentley.
- ————————— (1854). The Life and Correspondence of Charles, Lord Metcalfe. Vol. I. London: Richard Bentley.
- ————————— (1854). The Life and Correspondence of Charles, Lord Metcalfe. Vol. II. London: Richard Bentley.
- ————————— (1854). The Life and Correspondence of Henry St. George Tucker. London: Richard Bentley.
- ————————— (1856). The Life and Correspondence of Major-General Sir John Malcolm, G. C. B. Vol. I. London: Smith, Elder, and Co.
- ————————— (1856). The Life and Correspondence of Major-General Sir John Malcolm, G. C. B. Vol. II. London: Smith, Elder, and Co.
- ————————— (1859). Christianity in India: An Historical Narrative. London: Smith, Elder and Co.
- ————————— (1864). A History of the Sepoy war in India: 1857–1858. Vol. I (1 ed.). London: W. H. Allen & Co. The History of the Sepoy War in India (1864–1876), was later revised and continued by George Bruce Malleson and published in six volumes (1888–1889). A transcription of this later work is available online.
- ————————— (1870). A History of the Sepoy war in India: 1857–1858. Vol. II (1 ed.). London: W. H. Allen & Co.
- ————————— (1876). A History of the Sepoy war in India: 1857-1858. Vol. III (1 ed.). London: W. H. Allen & Co.
- ————————— (1867). Lives of Indian Officers. Vol. I. London: A. Strahan and Co.
- ————————— (1867). Lives of Indian Officers. Vol. II. London: A. Strahan and Co.
- ————————— (1871). The Essays of an Optimist. Philadelphia: J. B. Lippincott & Co.

Kaye further edited several works dealing with Indian affairs and was a frequent contributor to periodicals.

== Awards ==
- 1866: Fellow of the Royal Society (FRS)
- 1871: Knight Commander of the Order of the Star of India (KCSI).

== Bibliography ==
- Rapson, Edward James (1892). "Kaye, John William" . In Lee, Sidney (ed.). Dictionary of National Biography. Vol. 30. London: Smith, Elder & Co.
- "Kaye, Sir John William". Oxford Dictionary of National Biography (online ed.). Oxford University Press. doi:10.1093/ref:odnb/15201. (Subscription, Wikipedia Library access or UK public library membership required.)
- Gibson, Mary Ellis (2011). "Sir John William Kaye". Anglophone Poetry in Colonial India, 1780–1913: A Critical Anthology. Ohio University Press. pp. 196–202. JSTOR j.ctt1j7x7m1.
- Singh, Nihar Nandan Prasad (1977). The Life and Writings of Sir John William Kaye (1814–1876) (Doctor of Philosophy thesis). University of London. doi:10.25501/SOAS.00033547.
