= Peter G. Dyson =

British conductor and music director

Peter G. Dyson is a British conductor and music director of the Belmont Ensemble of London.

He studied at the Royal Academy of Music in London, where his teachers included Sir Colin Davis, Sir Simon Rattle, Sir Roger Norrington, Ilya Musin, Leonard Slatkin, Colin Metters, and George Hurst.

He has conducted the Latvian Philharmonic, Macedonian Philharmonic, Guatemala National Symphony, South Bohemian Chamber Orchestra, Philharmonie Ceske Budjedovice, Philharmonie Hrade Kralovek, New Queens Hall Orchestra, Chamber Orchestra at St.Paul's Cathedral, Melbourne Australia, Midlands Sinfonia, the English Chamber Choir, New London Singers, Barts Chamber Choir, Joyful Company of Singers, Tallis Chamber Choir, Codina Singers, Chameleon Arts Chorus, Northampton Bach Choir and St Martin-in-the-Fields Choir, St Martin's Voices and St Martin's Choral Scholars.

He has broadcast on BBC TV and Radio, Classic FM, Channel 4 TV and Channel 5 TV.

In 2000 he was elected an Associate of the Royal Academy of Music, London.

Since 1991 he has given over 700 concerts at St Martin-in-the-Fields Church in London with The Belmont Ensemble.
