= Captions (app) =

Video editing software company

Mirage
- Formerly: Captions
- Type: Private company
- Industry: Artificial intelligence
- Founded: 2021
- Founders: Gaurav Misra; Dwight Churchill
- Headquarters: New York City, United States
- Website: mirage.app

Mirage (formerly known as Captions) is a video-generating, video-editing and AI research company headquartered in New York City. Their first app, Captions, is available on iOS, Android, and Web and offers a suite of tools aimed at streamlining the creation and editing of videos. Their enterprise platform, Mirage Studio, generates AI actors and videos for marketing assets and video campaigns.

== History ==
Mirage was co-founded by Gaurav Misra and Dwight Churchill. During Misra's time leading design engineering at Snap Inc., he followed the rise of a new category of video, the "talking video." In 2021, Misra left Snap to found Mirage with his former colleague Churchill. Later that year, the Captions app launched with early backing from venture capital firms Sequoia Capital and Andreessen Horowitz as well as individual investors.

In 2023, the company released Lipdub, an Al dubbing app which translates any video with spoken audio into 28 languages.

In October 2023, Captions shared that it maintained over 100,000 daily active users with "about a million" videos being created monthly.

In November 2024, Captions acquired AlpacaML, a generative AI company that focused on art and other images.

In June 2025, Captions launched Mirage Studio, for marketers and advertising agencies.

In September 2025, Captions rebranded their company to Mirage. This change reflects the company's focus on developing their proprietary foundation model and future video products.

== Products ==
The Captions app offers features to automate common production tasks including captioning, editing, dubbing, script creation, and music integration. Mirage Studio allows users to generate AI avatars and create short-form videos from prompts or audio.

== Awards ==
- In 2023, the company was recognized as part of Fast Company's "Next Big Things In Tech" series.
- In 2024, the company won 2 Webby Awards for Best Use of AI & Machine Learning and Creative Production.
