= The Ordinary Princess =

Book by Mary Margaret Kaye

- First edition
- Author: M. M. Kaye
- Cover artist: M. M. Kaye
- Language: English
- Genre: Fairytale fantasy
- Published: 1980 (Kestrel Books)
- Publication place: United Kingdom
- Media type: Print

The Ordinary Princess is a children's novel written and illustrated by M. M. Kaye. It concerns Princess Amethyst Alexandra Augusta Araminta Adelaide Aurelia Anne of Phantasmorania—Amy for short—who has been given the "gift" of ordinariness.

Like the fairy tale of Sleeping Beauty, the story begins with the birth of a princess and the arrival of fairies—invited against the king's better judgment, for the sake of tradition—to give her gifts. The fairy godmother Crustacea, however, tells her, "You shall be Ordinary!" Unlike her six older sisters, Amy grows up with mousy hair, freckled, and plain, preferring playing in the woods to wearing fine clothes.

When she finds out that her parents want to hire a dragon so that a foreign prince can "rescue" her from it and thereby "win her hand in marriage", she climbs down the wisteria vine outside her window, runs away to live in the Forest of Faraway, and makes animal friends, Peter Aurelious the crow and Mr. Pemberthy the squirrel.

Realizing that her clothes have grown shabby and told by a fairy godmother that to buy new clothes she needs money and to get money she needs a job, she becomes fourteenth assistant kitchen-maid in the castle of the King of Ambergeldar, where she meets Peregrine, a man-of-all-work. They become friends; he eventually finds out that she is a princess, and she finds out that he is King Algernon of Ambergeldar, who, like her, hates his given name, and they marry.

The folk song "Lavender's Blue"—particularly the first two lines, Lavender's blue, rosemary's green, When I am king, you shall be queen—is a motif throughout the book.

Kaye has stated that "The Birches," the house Amy and Peregrine build together in the book, was based on a house that she and her sister Bets built in the Wilmcote Hill woods.
