= Death in Cyprus (novel) =

1956 novel by Mary Margaret Kaye

- First edition
- Author: M. M. Kaye
- Original title: Death Walked in Cyprus
- Language: English
- Genre: Mystery novel
- Publisher: Staples Press
- Publication date: 1956
- Publication place: United Kingdom

Death in Cyprus, first published as Death Walked in Cyprus, is a 1956 mystery novel by British author M. M. Kaye, published by Staples Press in the United Kingdom and by St. Martin's Press in the United States. It was republished in a revised edition in 1984.

== Plot ==
The story, set on the Mediterranean island of Cyprus, focuses on 21-year-old Amanda Derington who, against her strict uncle Oswin's wishes, decides to have a holiday on the beautiful island. However, whilst on a boat to the island, she witnesses the murder of one of the passengers. But the longer she spends on Cyprus, the more she gets the feeling that she was the intended victim.

Amanda Derington is staying in Egypt with her aunt and uncle; against her guardian's wishes she travels to Cyprus by ferry to see the island. Her aunt arranges for her to stay with an elderly female member of the British expatriate community who turns out to be eccentric, charming and insightful.

On the ferry Amanda meets Steve for the first time and a murder occurs in which they are both involved. Once on Cyprus Steve and Amanda see a lot of each other despite her thinking him attractive but rude (and knowing he would be completely unacceptable to her guardian) and he saying that her presence was distracting him. Steve appears to be an artist and he can certainly draw but there is some mystery about him.

Through a series of near death experiences and a couple of misunderstandings, the novel reaches a satisfactory end with the unmasking of the murderer and the union of Steve and Amanda.
