= William Barker Daniel =

British cleric and writer (1754–1833)

William Barker Daniel (1754–1833) was an English cleric and writer on field sports.

== Life ==
The son of William Daniel, an attorney, he was born in Colchester. He was educated at Felsted School and Christ's College, Cambridge, earning his B.A. in 1787 and his M.A. in 1790. He was never beneficed. Although he took holy orders in the Church of England, his name is not in Richard Gilbert's List of Beneficed Clergy (1829). He did receive an appointment as private chaplain to the Prince of Wales, in 1788, which he is thought to have retained for most of his life.

Daniel indulged in sporting tastes to a degree which shocked even a tolerant age. A correspondent in the Gentleman's Magazine of 1802 wrote of him as "fitter to act the character of Nimrod than that of a dignitary in the church of England". At the end of 1833 he died in Garden Row, within the rules of the King's Bench, where he had resided for 20 years.

== Works ==
Daniel's Rural Sports appeared in 2 vols. in 1801, dedicated to Joseph Holden Strutt, M.P., and became a hit with sportsmen of the beginning of the century. The book is a compilation with some original matter. Hunting, coursing, and shooting were fully described with plates. A new edition in 3 vols. was issued in 1812, and a supplementary volume in 1813, dedicated to the Marquis of Blandford, a miscellaneous collection with a bibliography of angling (from Henry Ellis). Ralph Payne-Gallwey noted the book as one of the earliest accounts of shooting wildfowl from a punt.

Besides this, Daniel published in 1822 Plain Thoughts of Former Years upon the Lord's Prayer, in eight discourses.
