= The Wishing Game =

1999 novel by Patrick Redmond

- First edition cover
- Author: Patrick Redmond
- Language: English
- Genre: Psychological thriller
- Set in: 1950s Norfolk
- Publisher: Hodder & Stoughton
- Publication date: 1999
- Publication place: United Kingdom
- Media type: Print
- Pages: 404
- ISBN: 978-0-340-74817-6
- OCLC: 59399808

The Wishing Game is a psychological suspense novel by British author Patrick Redmond. It was his debut novel and was published in 1999. The novel is set in a boarding school for boys in 1950s Norfolk, England. It deals with bullying, secrets, supernatural phenomena, and homosexuality. It was published in the US as Something Dangerous.

== Synopsis ==
Jonathan Palmer is a shy teenager at a traditional British boys' boarding school in the 1950s. He has three friends: bookworm Nicholas and twins, Stephen and Michael. Unfortunately, his friends live in a separate dormitory, leaving Jonathan exposed to regular bullying at the hands of sadistic James Wheatley and his cronies Stuart and George. There is only one boy who is not bullied with James Wheatley – Richard Rokeby. Richard is a loner but has confidence and scathing wit. Jonathan gradually befriends dark and dangerous Richard, who in turn encourages Jonathan to be brave and stand up to the bullies (both students and faculty members). Richard begins to turn Jonathan against his three friends.

One night, Richard suggests that the boys play a game with a ouija board that he has brought to the school from his aunt's house. The twins refuse and leave. Nicholas refuses to let Richard scare him, so he remains. Following that evening, bad things begin to happen that Jonathan believes he has caused. Both James Wheatley's cronies leave the school – Stuart's family leaves for the United States and George spends a considerable time in hospital after a brutal injury on the rugby field. This leaves James Wheatley vulnerable. James Wheatley becomes paranoid and becomes too afraid to go to sleep. Driven mad, he ends up running out of the school in his pyjamas and is killed in a hit and run. Jonathan believes that it was his fault and begins to fear Richard Rokeby.

It is on the last night of the school year that police are called to the school grounds. The headmaster has a heart attack. The cruel Latin professor has gone insane and has beaten his wife to death. The closeted history teacher has hanged himself. Michael has fallen to his death trying to stand up to Richard. The police break into a locked room where Richard and Jonathan are. Both boys are dead and one police officer has to break a window for air, as he is suffocated by an indescribable smell in the room. Nicholas ends up taking the blame for all of it, despite being innocent.

Many decades later, an adult Nicholas tells his story to a journalist. However, he tells the journalist that if he publishes the story, Nicholas will ensure that his life is ruined. Nicholas claims that, like Richard and Jonathan, he also acquired dark powers during their "wishing game" with the ouija board. The journalist deliberates for a few moments before throwing the tape recordings of Nicholas's story into the fire.
