= The Far Pavilions =

1978 novel by M.M. Kaye

- Author: M. M. Kaye
- Publisher: Allen Lane
- Publication date: September 1978
- Media type: Print (hardcover)
- Pages: 1000 pp (first edition)

The Far Pavilions is an epic novel of British-Indian history by M. M. Kaye, published in 1978, which tells the story of a British officer during the British Raj. There are many parallels between this novel and Rudyard Kipling's Kim that was published in 1900: the settings, the young English boy raised as a native by an Indian surrogate mother, "the Great Game" as it was played by the British Empire and Imperial Russia. The novel, rooted deeply in the romantic epics of the 19th century, has been hailed as a masterpiece of storytelling. It is based partly on biographical writings by the author's grandfather, as well as her knowledge of and childhood experiences in India. It has sold millions of copies, caused travel agents to create tours that visited the locations in the book, and inspired a television adaptation and a musical play.

== Plot summary ==
Ashton Pelham-Martyn (Ash) is the son of a British botanist travelling through India; he is born on the road, in 1852. His mother dies from childbed fever shortly after his birth, and his father dies of cholera a few years later. He is entrusted to his Hindu ayah (nanny) Sita to be brought to his English relatives in the city of Mardan. After discovering that all British feringhis have been killed during the Sepoy uprising of 1857, Sita adopts the dark-skinned Ash and takes him in search of safety.

They eventually find refuge in the kingdom of Gulkote where Ashton, now going by the name Ashok, forgets his English parentage and grows up as a native Indian boy. While working as a servant for Lalji, the young yuveraj (crown prince) of Gulkote, Ashton befriends the neglected princess Anjuli, in addition to the master of stables, Koda Dad, and his son Zarin. At the age of 11, Ashton uncovers a murderous conspiracy against Lalji and learns he himself will be killed for interfering with the plot. Promising Anjuli he will return for her one day, he and Sita escape the palace with assistance from friends whom Sita and Ashton have made within the palace over the years, and they flee from Gulkote. The ailing Sita dies en route, but not before revealing to Ash his true parentage and entrusting him with the letters and money his father gave her before his death.

Ashton makes his way to the military division Sita instructed him about, and they recognise him; now known by his English name, Ashton is turned over to British authorities and sent to England for a formal education and military training. At age 19, Ashton returns to India as an officer in the Corps of Guides with Zarin on the Northern Frontier. He quickly finds that his sense of place is torn between his newfound status as Ashton, a British "sahib", and Ashok, the native Indian boy he once believed he was.

After being absent without leave in Afghanistan (in an effort to restore the honour of his soldiers, penalized for losing weapons to border raiders), Ash is suspended from the Guides and sent to escort a royal wedding party across India. The party is in fact from the former kingdom of Gulkote, now known as Karidkote after merging with a neighbouring principality, and Anjuli and her sister Shushila are the princesses to be married. Also in the wedding party is Anjuli's younger brother, Prince Jhoti. After revealing himself as Ashok to Anjuli, Ash falls in love with her but is unable to act on his feelings as she is not only betrothed to another but belongs to what is now an alien culture, across a divide which they can no longer bridge. Over the months that follow, Ash thwarts a plot to murder Jhoti and falls into increasing despair over his unrequited love for Anjuli. While caught in a dust storm together, Anjuli reveals her love for Ash but rebuffs his pleas to run away with him out of duty to her sister as a co-bride in an arranged marriage. Ash is forced to watch Anjuli be married off to the lecherous Rana of Bhithor and return to his duties in the military.

Two years later, Ash receives distressing news that the rana is dying and that his wives are to be burned alive in the Hindu ritual of suttee. Racing to Bhithor, Ash and his friends manage to rescue Anjuli and take her to safety; this rescue results in the death of not only Ash's beloved horse but also most of the human members of the party. He insists upon marrying Anjuli, despite the insistence of all other members of his group of acquaintances, including Anjuli, that this is not only unnecessary but against divine law.

Here the book's focus shifts from the relationship between Ash and Anjuli to Britain's and Russia's political wrangling in the regions north of what were the Indian borders at the time. In Britain's desire to expand its territory into Afghanistan, Ash is sent into the country as a spy to relay information that will help Britain establish a permanent foothold in the area. What follows is an account of the first phase of the Second Afghan War, culminating in the September 1879 Siege of the British Residency in Kabul. This part of the story is told mostly from the perspective of Ash's best friend, Walter "Wally" Hamilton.

After the uprising in Kabul, Ash and Anjuli set out in search of a paradise in the Himalayas – "the far pavilions" – free of prejudice, where they can live out their lives in peace.

== Critical reception ==
On 5 November 2019, BBC News listed The Far Pavilions on its list of the 100 most influential novels.

== Characters ==
- Ashton (Ashok) Pelham-Martyn
- Anjuli-Bai
- Koda Dad Khan
- Biju Ram
- Mrs. Viccary
- Shushila-Bai
- Belinda Harlowe
- Kaka-ji Rao
- Walter Hamilton
- Zarin Khan
- Sita
- Lalji
- Jhoti
- Louis Cavagnari
- Wigram Battye
- Captain Red Stiggins
- Angus McNulty

== Film, TV and theatrical adaptations ==
=== Miniseries ===
For HBO and Goldcrest, and first screened in 1984 in the UK, Peter Duffell directed a five-hour three-part television miniseries based on the novel, starring Ben Cross as Ashton, Amy Irving as Anjuli, Omar Sharif as Koda Dad and Christopher Lee as Kaka-ji Rao. Although there were actors of Asian descent in the cast, several key Asian roles such as Anjuli's were performed by white actors in brownface. It was HBO's first mini series, the complete version runs for 300 minutes, and the parts were titled "Return to India", "The Journey to Bhithor", and "Wally and Anjuli". (The current DVD release splits each of these parts into two, creating 6 parts each of about 50 minutes, adding a credit section at the newly created break in each part, and removes the title card names of the original parts.)

A theatrical release of the series, titled Blade of Steel, ran 140 minutes, cutting half the story. Although conventional in storytelling and photography, the mini series had ample production value (at a budget of $12 million it was the most expensive made-for-cable film at the time) and is faithful to the book, although cutting short the youth of Ashton before his return to India, and transposing the Afghan rebellion and Ash's rescue of Anjuli. Carl Davis composed the score.

Goldcrest Films invested £6,755,000 in the production; it incurred a loss of £2 million.

The 1984 television mini-series was made available on DVD in the UK and US, distributed by Acorn Media UK.

=== Musical ===
A stage musical adaptation of The Far Pavilions, produced by Michael E. Ward, with music composed by Philip Henderson, premiered at the Shaftesbury Theatre in London's West End on 14 April 2005, after two weeks of previews. Despite being booked until 14 January 2006, The Far Pavilions closed on 17 September 2005, following an announcement on 17 August 2005. The musical received mixed reviews, but its closing early was attributed to a steep drop in ticket sales subsequent to the 7/7 London bombings. Budgeted at 4 million pounds, the musical's cast featured Hadley Fraser as Ashton, Simon Gleeson as Walter, Gayatri Iyer as Anjuli, Kulvinder Ghir as the Rana of Bhithor and Kabir Bedi as Kahn Sahib.

While in India in March 2006 (to scatter M M Kaye's ashes over Lake Pichola) Michael E. Ward announced that he had written the script for a sequel to The Far Pavilions, titled Fireflies, whose projected stage premiere was to be in Mumbai in January 2007, with Ward hoping for a subsequent London stage engagement and a film version. There are no evident subsequent reports of any progress in this projected sequel to The Far Pavilions.

== Audio drama ==
The Far Pavilions was adapted for BBC Radio 4 in the UK. It was broadcast in twenty 15-minute episodes between 31 January 2011 and 25 February 2011, and repeated on BBC Radio 4 Extra in July and August 2015 and in February 2020.
