= Linktree =

Australian reference landing page service

- Developer: Alex Zaccaria; Anthony Zaccaria; Nick Humphreys; Bolster Creative PTY LTD
- Type: Social media, bio landing page link
- Status: Active
- Members: 70 Million
- Pricing model: Freemium
- Website: linktr.ee

Linktree is an Australian freemium social media reference landing page service provider headquartered in Melbourne. It was developed by Alex Zaccaria, Anthony Zaccaria, and Nick Humphreys.

Founded in 2016, it serves as a landing page for a person or company's entire associated links in social media, which rarely allows linking to multiple sites. The site was inspired by the developers' annoyance with social media that cannot or do not allow multiple hyperlinks. In 2022, Linktree became a unicorn after a funding round of $152 million which valued it at $1.7 billion.

== History ==
Linktree was established in 2016, out of annoyance regarding social media that do not allow multiple hyperlinks in profiles. The site was created in six hours. It is reported to have gained 3,000 users overnight, which caused the server to crash due to overload.

In 2018, Instagram banned the site due to spam, although it was lifted and Instagram issued an apology. It was reported that Linktree, started as a link-in-bio tool for Instagram, was banned from Instagram in 2018, since it was noted as "breaking the community standards," specifically as a spam website. Linktree stated that they were "working on it" with their "representatives on Instagram." This ban was lifted after thousands of users advocated on Linktree's behalf. Although the ban was lifted and Instagram issued an apology, as of March 2021, Instagram accounts for less than 40% of Linktree's profile traffic.

In December 2018, the number of users reached 1 million, then 3 million by the end of 2019. By October 2020, Linktree had gained more than 8 million users.

As of March 2021, the number of users reached nearly 16 million, with an increase of 300% over the previous year.

In August 2021, Linktree announced the acquisition of smart link provider Odesli to become a "one-stop-shop" for musicians seeking to monetize their art. Since the early 2020s, the "link-in-bio" market has expanded with alternative platforms offering customizable and adaptive landing page services, such as Linklay.

== Features and subscriptions ==
Linktree is a freemium service: it is free, but also offers a 'Pro' subscription launched in April 2017, which gives more benefits, such as more customization options, more detailed analytics, email sign-up integration, removal of the Linktree logo, etc. Users can upload as many links as they wish despite not subscribing. Pro analytics allows users to view their click-through rates. Both offerings allow users to create a personalized and customizable page, that houses all social media links and official websites. Linktree also partnered with Amazon, allowing users to upload their Amazon store profile as an affiliate link. Amid the George Floyd protests, Linktree allowed users to adopt a 'Support Anti-Racism' icon, which pops a tab linking visitors to articles to further understand racism, organizations to donate to, and places to protest.

== Accolades ==
In 2019, Linktree was included in CNBC's 'Upstart 100' list of "brightest, most intriguing, young startups promising to become the great companies of tomorrow." In March 2020, Fast Company placed Linktree as fourth place in the 'Most Innovative Companies of 2020' list in the 'Social media' category for "making Instagram's 'link in bio' into a sleek menu for sharing articles, merch, or paid partnerships." For comparison's sake, in that year the first place was Cameo and the third Pinterest; while the fourth place of other years were Reddit (2018 and 2021), Are.na (2019) and Genies, Inc. (2022).

== Funding ==
On 27 October 2020, Linktree announced that it had received US$10.7 million in Series A financing from Airtree Ventures and Insight Partners. The funding is the company's first from an institutional investor. On 26 March 2021, Linktree announced the closing of a $45M Series B financing round. The round was co-led by Index Ventures and Coatue, with participation from returning investors Airtree Ventures and Insight Partners.

In 2022, Linktree raised $152 million at a valuation of $1.7 billion. The investment round led by Index Ventures and Coatue Management.

== See also ==
- Online advertising
- Advertising network
