= Felsted School =

Public school in Essex, England

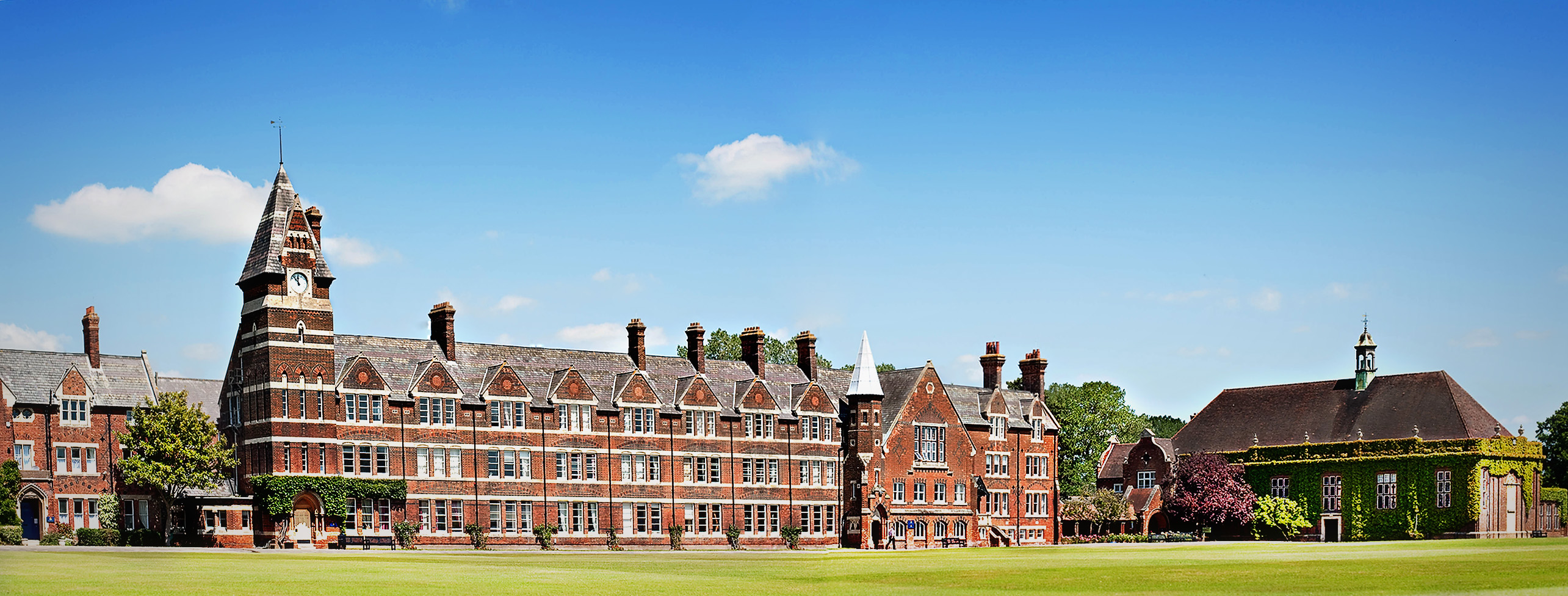

Location
- Stebbing Road; Felsted, Essex, CM6 3LL; England; 51.8587°N 0.4367°E

Information
- Type: Public school Private day and boarding
- Motto: French: Garde Ta Foy (Keep your Faith)
- Religious affiliation: Church of England
- Established: 1564; 462 years ago
- Founder: Richard Rich, 1st Baron Rich
- Department for Education URN: 115395 Tables
- Headmaster: Chris Townsend
- Gender: Co-educational
- Age: 4 to 18
- Enrolment: 1,000
- Colours: Burgundy (Prep School) navy blue (Senior School)
- Alumni: Old Felstedians
- Website: http://www.felsted.org/

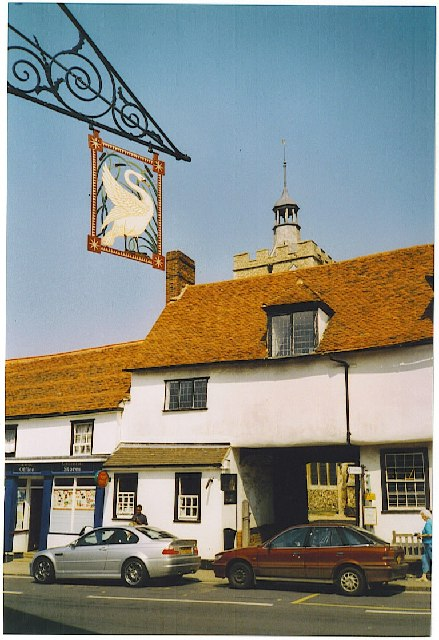
The 16th-century school room of Felsted School

Felsted School is a co-educational independent boarding and day school, situated in Felsted in Essex, England. It is in the British public school tradition, and was founded in 1564 by Richard Rich, 1st Baron Rich. Felsted is one of the 12 founder members of the Headmasters' and Headmistresses' Conference, and a full member of the Round Square Conference of world schools. Felsted School is featured in the Good Schools Guide and is regularly featured in Tatler's Schools Guide. Felsted School was shortlisted for 'Boarding School of the Year' 2020 by the Times Education Supplement (TES).

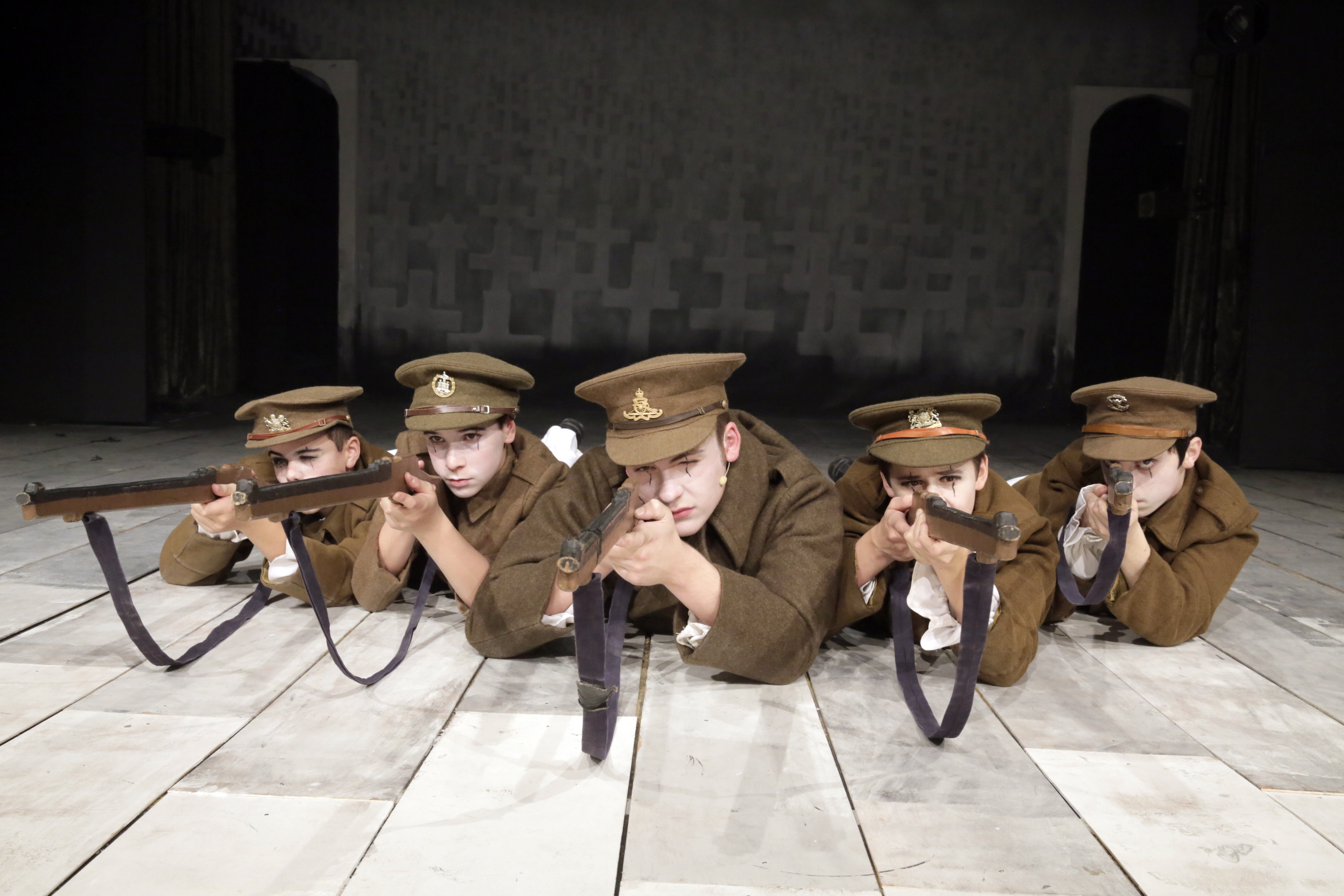
Felsted's production of "Oh, What a Lovely War!"

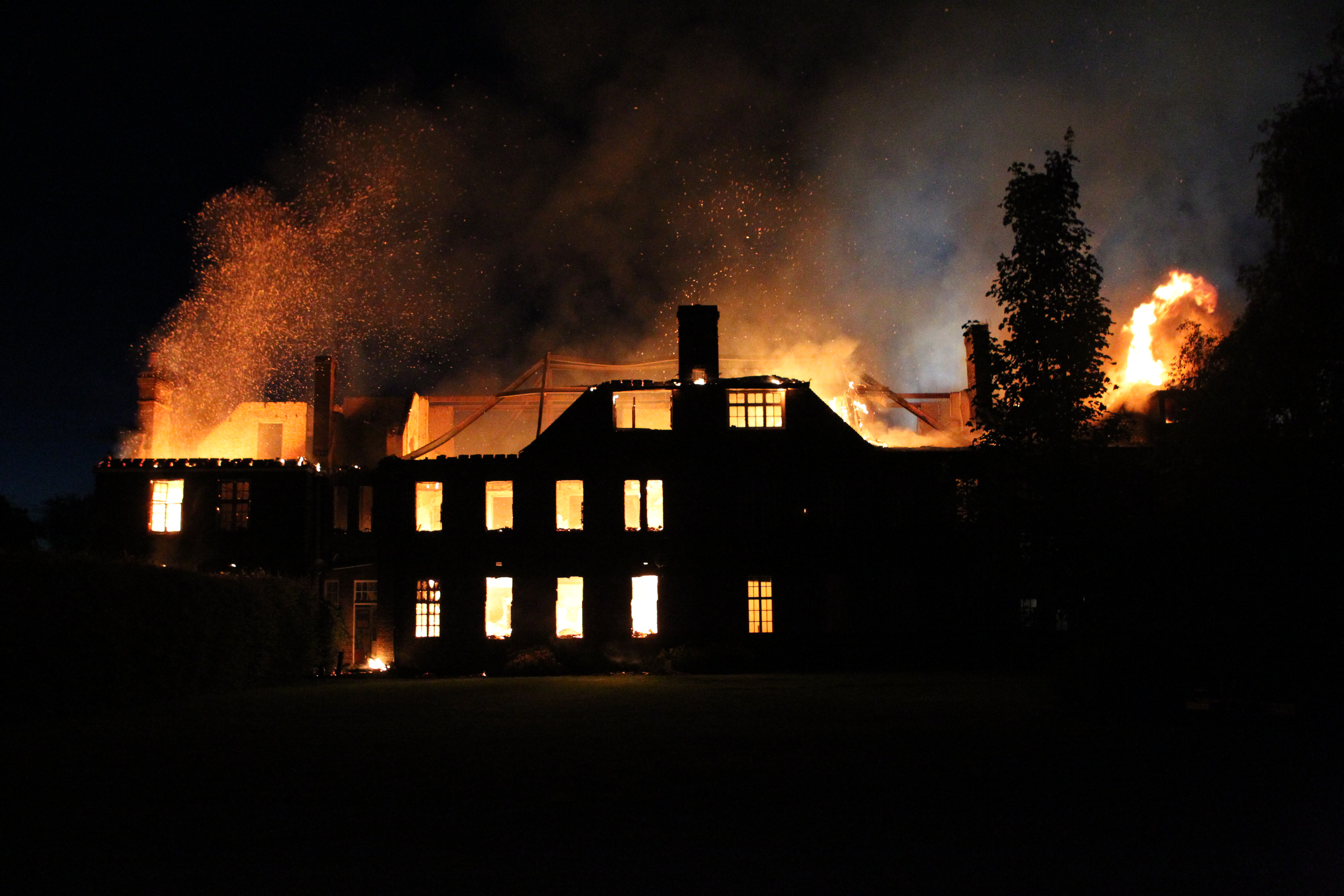
Fire at Felsted School in 2012

Felsted is notable for having educated a British head of state, Richard Cromwell, who was Lord Protector from 1658 to 1659. The current buildings date from the 1850s and were largely designed by Frederic Chancellor.

== History ==
Felsted was founded in 1564 by Richard Rich, 1st Baron Rich (also known as Riche) who, as Lord Chancellor and Chancellor of the Court of Augmentations, acquired considerable wealth from the spoils of the Dissolution of the Monasteries including the nearby Leez Priory where he lived.

The school became a notable educational centre for Puritan families in the 17th century, numbering a hundred or more pupils, under Martin Holbeach, Headmaster from 1627 to 1649, and his successors (see below). John Wallis and Isaac Barrow were educated at Felsted in this period, as were four of Oliver Cromwell's sons.

Another era of prosperity set in under the headmastership of William Trivett between 1778 and 1794; but numbers dwindled under his successors. Thomas Surridge (headmaster 1835–1850) discovered from research among the records, that a larger income was really due to the foundation, a re-organisation took place by Act of Parliament, and in 1850, under the headmastership of the Rev. Albert Henry Wratislaw, the school was put under a new governing body (a revised scheme coming into operation in 1876). Thereafter, Felsted rapidly developed into one of the regular public schools of the modern English type, under the Rev. W. S. Grignon. New buildings were built on an elaborate scale, numbers increased to more than 200, and a complete transformation took place, which was continued under Grignon's successors, like Frank Stephenson, who ordered large extensions to the buildings and playing-fields. This allowed admittance up to 475 pupils, nearly all of whom were boarders.

The school was evacuated to three Herefordshire houses near Ross-on-Wye during the Second World War at the owners invitation to be out of the way of German bombing. Most of the school was in Goodrich Court and Windsor's and Ingle's Houses occupied Hill Court Manor.

On 25 July 1953 the school's Combined Cadet Force armoury was raided by the Irish Republican Army (1922–69), making off with 8 Bren guns, 12 Sten guns, an anti-tank gun, a mortar and 109 rifles. Their van was stopped by a police patrol and Cathal Goulding, Sean Stephenson, later known as Seán Mac Stíofáin and Manus Canning each received 8 years in prison.

Major building works took place for the 400th anniversary celebrations in 1964, when the Queen Mother laid the foundation stone for the then new Music School, subsequently opened by Felsted governor Lord Butler of Saffron Walden. In 2008 the building was replaced by a larger building, which was opened in 2009 by Dame Evelyn Glennie. The Princess Royal opened the new Lord Riche Hall in 1989. Girls were admitted into the Sixth Form in 1970 and into the whole school in 1993.

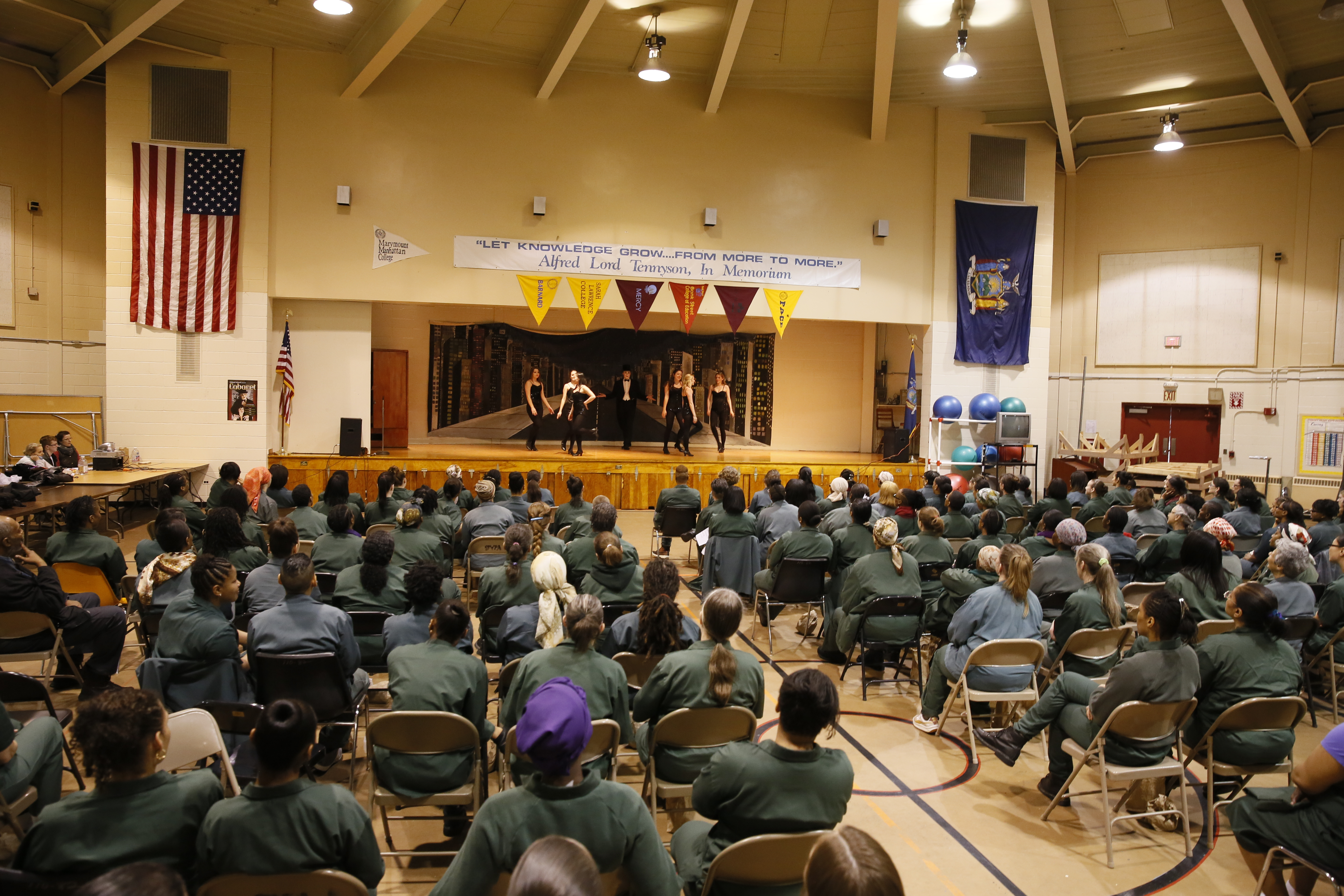
Felsted School perform 'Cabaret' in Bedford Hills Correctional Facility

== Architecture ==
In 1854 the architect Frederic Chancellor won an architectural competition to reconstitute the school accommodation. The first phase of building was completed in 1867 and included the Headmaster's House, the Second Master's House, and the main building and water tower which run in between both houses. In 1873 he completed the Chapel followed by the infirmary in 1879 (now the Gepp's and Deacon's boarding houses). In 1883 he designed the gymnasium followed by the swimming bath (1994–6) and science laboratory (1899). Other notable architects to have worked on the site include Sir Reginald Blomfield, who designed Elwyn House in 1900, and Alan E. Munby who designed Follyfield House (1928–9).

== 21st century ==
The success of taking drama productions every two years to perform in American high schools from 2000 onwards, led to the school being invited in 2008 by the U.S. authorities to put on a production of Stephen Sondheim's A Funny Thing Happened on the Way to the Forum at Bedford Hills Correctional Facility for Women. The audience consisted of life prisoners and received international news coverage. The success of this venture led to three further productions in the Correctional Facility: Joseph and the Amazing Technicolor Dreamcoat (2010), The Secret Garden (2012) and Cabaret (2014).

In July 2012 part of the school was devastated by fire after a blaze broke out in the roof and first floor of Follyfield House, one of the girls' boarding houses. The school term had ended but about 25 students and staff from a summer school were on site and evacuated. Nobody was injured. The school reopened as normal in September, with a new, temporary house situated next to the Lord Riche Hall. Soon after, an all new state-of-the-art boarding house was built in a different location, nearer to Gepp's & Deacon's houses, and opened as planned in September 2014.

On 6 May 2014, the school was visited by reigning monarch Queen Elizabeth II to mark the 450th anniversary of Felsted School. She unveiled plaques for the visit as well as officially opening the newly constructed Follyfield House.

Fees in 2020/2021 range from £24,495 per year for a day pupil to £37,485 per year for full boarding.

== Recognition ==
Felsted is one of the 12 founder members of the Headmasters' and Headmistresses' Conference, and a member of the Round Square Conference of world schools. Felsted School is featured in the Good Schools Guide and is regularly featured in Tatler's Schools Guide. Felsted School was shortlisted for 'Boarding School of the Year' 2020 by the Times Education Supplement (TES).

== Houses ==
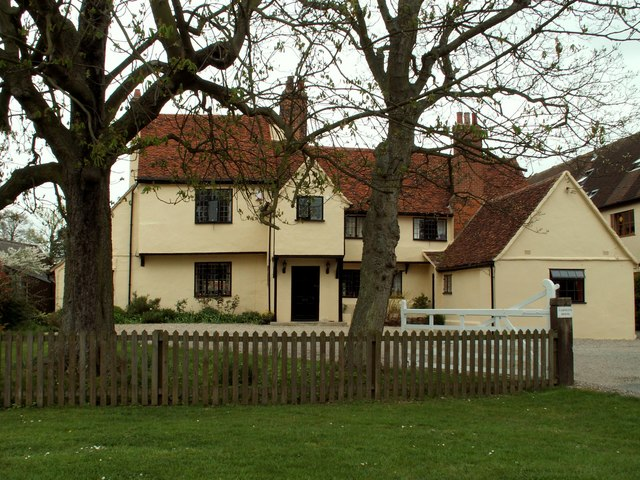
Garnett's House

Girls' boarding houses are Stocks' Follyfield (referred to as 'Follies') Garnetts and Thorne

Boys' boarding houses are Elywn's Gepp's Deacon's and Windsor's.

There are two day houses, Manor and Montgomery's. (referred to as 'Monts')

== Notable headmasters ==
- 1850–1855: Rev. Albert Henry Wratislaw, MA (1822–1892)
- 1933–1943: Rev. Canon Kenneth Julian Faithfull Bickersteth, MC, MA, QHC (1885–1962)
- 2015–present: Christopher James Townsend (b. 1972)
