= List of compositions by Marc Wilkinson =

This is a list of the compositions by Marc Wilkinson, divided by genre:

== Music for theatre productions and revue ==
- Richard III (Royal Shakespeare Company, 1961)
- Cymbeline (Royal Shakespeare Company, 1962)
- The Dutch Courtesan (1964)
- The Royal Hunt of the Sun (1964)
- Mother Courage and her Children (1964)
- Trelawny of the Wells (1965)
- Love For Love (1965)
- Armstrong’s Last Goodnight (1965)
- A Bond Honoured (1966)
- The Performing Giant (Royal Court Theatre, London, 1966)
- The Storm (1966)
- Macbeth (1966)
- Rosencrantz and Guildenstern Are Dead (1967)
- As You Like It (1967)
- Three Sisters (1967)
- Volpone (1968)
- Love’s Labour’s Lost (1968)
- Back to Methuselah (1968)
- The Covent Garden Tragedy (1968)
- The Way of the World (1969)
- The Travails of Sancho Panza (1969)
- The White Devil (1969)
- National Health (1969)
- Cyrano de Bergerac (1970)
- The Good Natured Man (1971)
- The Duchess of Malfi (1971)
- A Woman Killed With Kindness (1971)
- Byron, the Naked Peacock (1971)
- Jumpers (1972)
- Richard II (1972)
- The Misanthrope (1972)
- The Bacchae (1973)
- The Cherry Orchard (1973)
- Equus (1973)
- Romeo and Juliet (1974)
- Grand Manoeuvres (1974)
- Spring Awakening (1974)
- Too True to Be Good (1975)
- Carte Blanche (1976)
- Man and Superman (1977)
- Wild Oats (1977)
- The Beaux Stratagem (1988)

== Film scores ==
- If.... (1968)
- The Royal Hunt of the Sun (1969)
- The Blood on Satan's Claw (1971)
- Family Life (film) (1971)
- The Darwin Adventure - documentary (1972)
- The Man and the Snake (short) (1972)
- The Triple Echo (1972)
- Eagle in a Cage (1972)
- I The Return (short) (1973)
- The Hireling (1973)
- Philadelphia, Here I Come (1975)
- The Morning Spider (short) (1976)
- The Mango Tree (1977)
- The Quatermass Conclusion (1979: edited down from TV series)
- Eagle's Wing (1979)
- The Fiendish Plot of Dr. Fu Manchu (1980)
- Looks and Smiles (1981)
- Enigma (1982)
- A Day on the Grand Canal with the Emperor of China or: Surface Is Illusion But So Is Depth (documentary) (1988)
- Rosencrantz & Guildenstern are Dead (1990)

== Television scores ==
- Play for Today (TV series) (1970–79)
  - "The Lie" (1970)
  - "Blue Remembered Hills" (1979)
- Days of Hope (TV drama mini-series) (1975)
  - "1916: Joining Up" (1975)
  - "1921" (1975)
  - "1924" (1975)
  - "1926: General Strike" (1975)
- Quatermass (TV series) (1979)
  - "Ringstone Round" (1979)
  - "Lovely Lightning" (1979)
  - "What Lies Beneath" (1979)
  - "An Endangered Species" (1979)
- Hammer House of Horror (TV series) (1980)
  - "Visitor from the Grave" (1980)
- Very Like a Whale (TV movie) (1981)
- Tales of the Unexpected (TV series) (1981–88)
  - "The Way to Do It" (1981)
  - "The Skeleton Key" (1982)
  - "The Absence of Emily" (1982)
  - "A Harmless Vanity" (1982)
  - "A Time to Die" (1988)
- The Bell (TV series: four episodes) (1982)
- All for Love (TV series) (1982-3)
  - "A Dedicated Man" (1982)
  - "Mrs Silly" (1983)
- The Case of the Frightened Lady (TV movie) (1983)
- Kim (TV movie) (1984)
- A Voyage Round My Father (TV movie) (1984)
- Coming Through (TV movie) (1985)
- End of Empire (TV documentary series) (1985)
- Screen Two (TV series) (1987)
  - "Visitors" (1987)
- Ruth Rendell Mysteries (TV series) (1987)
  - "Wolf to the Slaughter: Part One" (1987)
