= Peter Shaw (producer, born 1942) =

British film producer (born 1942)

- Born: 6 November 1942 (age 83); Windsor, Berkshire, England
- Education: Eton College
- Occupation: Film producer
- Years active: 1970–present
- Spouse: Valerie Anne (nee McAlpine)
- Children: 2

Peter Shaw (born 6 November 1942) is a British film producer, known for Champions, Keep the Aspidistra Flying, The Water Babies, The Will to Work, and Enigma.

== Early life ==
Shaw was born on 6 November 1942 in Windsor, Berkshire, the son of Thomas William and Margaret Aylwen. He was educated at Eton College, followed by a three-year short service commission in the British Army serving with the Royal Green Jackets.

== Career ==
In 1970 Shaw identified a pressing need for new, up-to-date management training films. Between 1970 and 1973 he produced eight industrial training films, distributed worldwide by the Rank Organisation, winning a Grierson for "The Will to Work"; meanwhile he expanded his film interests. From 1970 to 1980 he co-produced a 12 part TV series Let's Face It and a number of TV documentaries and cinema shorts, including: The World of Miss World, Race for the Double Helix, Maharajahs, Victorians, Display, Sport of Kings, Wind in the Wires.

In 1971 Shaw acquired the screen rights to Nicholas Monsarrat's novel Something to Hide, which went into production in 1972 starring Peter Finch and Shelley Winters, directed by Alistair Reid. In 1975 he teamed up with producer Joseph Shaftel to produce a remake of the 1945 movie The Spiral Staircase directed by Peter Collinson and starring Jacqueline Bisset and Christopher Plummer distributed by Warner Bros. Then in 1978 he produced The Water Babies and Eagles Wing for The Rank Organisation in 1979. In 1982 Shaw produced Enigma in Paris as an Anglo/French co-production; with screenplay by John Briley, directed by Jeannot Szwarc and starring Martin Sheen, Bridget Fosse, Sam Neill.

In 1984 he formed and became CEO of United British Artists Ltd (UBA). Shortly after formation he negotiated "first look" deals for UBA with MGM/UA in Hollywood and with TESE in UK.

In 2017, he acted as executive producer on The Ninth Passenger, which was shot and produced in Canada and which he had previously developed with Lionsgate (UK) in London.

== Filmography ==
Year	Title	Role	Notes	ref
1972	Something to Hide	Associate producer	Thriller film directed by Alastair Reid	
1974	The World of Miss World	Producer	Documentary directed by Tony Palmer	
1975	The Spiral Staircase	Producer	Horror mystery thriller film directed by Peter Collinson and a remake of the 1945 film of the same name	
1978	The Water Babies	Producer	Live action-animated feature film directed by Lionel Jeffries	
1979	Eagle's Wing	Executive producer	Euro-Western Eastmancolor film directed by Anthony Harvey	
1982	Enigma	Producer	Anglo-American drama film directed by Jeannot Szwarc	
1984	Champions	Producer	Based on the true story of jockey Bob Champion and directed by John Irvin	
1986	Castaway	Executive producer	Adventure-drama film directed by Nicolas Roeg and adapted from its namesake 1984 book by Lucy Irvine	
1988	Taffin	Producer	Irish thriller film directed by Francis Megahy	
1997	Keep the Aspidistra Flying	Producer	Romantic/comedy film directed by Robert Bierman and based on the eponymous novel by George Orwell; Also known as A Merry War in the United States and New Zealand	
1997	The Tale of Sweeney Todd	Executive producer and story	Crime-drama/horror television film directed by John Schlesinger	
2017	The Ninth Passenger	Executive producer	Horror Movie	

== Awards ==
Year	Film	Award	Result
1971	Will to Work	John Grierson Award for best Industrial documentary film	Winner
1984	Champions	Berlin International Film Festival Golden Bear Award	Nominated
