= Sahib =

Arabic word meaning "companion", used as honorific title

Sahib or Saheb (/ˈsɑːhɪb/) is a term of address originating from Arabic (صاحب, ṣāḥib). As a loanword, Sahib has passed into several languages, including Persian, Kurdish, Turkish, Azerbaijani, Kazakh, Uzbek, Turkmen, Tajik, Crimean Tatar, Hindustani (Hindi-Urdu), Punjabi, Pashto, Bengali, Gujarati, Marathi, Rohingya and Somali. During medieval times, it was used either as an official title or an honorific. Now, in South and Central Asia, it is almost exclusively used to give respect to someone higher or lower. The honorific has largely been replaced with sir. In the Tibeto-Burman language of Mizo, it is shortened as sâp, referring to people of European descent.

== Derived non-ruling princes' titles ==
=== Sahibzada ===
Sahibzada is a princely style or title equivalent to, or referring to a young prince. This derivation using the Persian suffix -zada(h), literally 'born from' (or further male/female descendant; compare Shahzada) a Sahib, was also (part of) the formal style for some princes of the blood of Hindu and Muslim dynasties in the Indian sub-continent, e.g.:

- Babu Saheb is a colloquial term used to denote the rajput kshatriyas (warrior sons of a king)
- The sons of a ruling Nawab of Arcot (the head of the family; political pensioners, the only princely title still recognized by the Indian Republic) are styled: Sahibzada (personal name) Khan Bahadur, 'not' Nawabzada (literally 'son of the Nawab').
- The sons of Guru Gobind Singh are known as Sahibzaadey.
- In Bahawalpur, Pakistan, the younger sons of the ruling Nawab/Amir were styled: Sahibzada (personal name) Khan Abassi; but the Heir Apparent: Nawabzada (personal name) Khan Abassi, Wali Ahad Bahadur.
- In Mandi Bahauddin, Punjab, Pakistan, the sons of a Zaildar are addressed as Sahibzada.
- In Baoni, the younger sons and other male descendants of the ruling Nawab, in the male line, were styled Sahibzada (personal name) Khan Bahadur, while the Heir Apparent was: Nawabzada (personal name) Khan, Wali Ahad Bahadur; either could be personally promoted to Nawab.
- In Bhopal, the grandsons of the ruling Nawab were styled: Sahibzada (personal name) Khan, while the Heir Apparent was the Wali Ahad Bahadur, the younger sons: Nawab (personal name) Khan Bahadur.
- In Jaora, more distant male relatives of the ruling Nawab than the sons (who were Nawabzada) were styled: Sahibzada (personal name) Khan.
- In Khudadad, Tipu Sultan's grandsons and other male descendants of the sovereign Padshah bahadur were styled: Sahibzada (personal name), until in 1860 the colonial (British) Indian Government extended to them the existing style for sons of the ruling Nawab: Shahzada (personal name) Sahib.
- In Malerkotla, where the Heir Apparent was Nawabzada (personal name) Khan Bahadur, the younger sons of the ruling Nawab were styled: Sahibzada (personal name) Khan Bahadur.
- In Savanur, where sons of the ruling Nawab were Nawabzada, the other male descendants in the male line: Sahibzada (personal name) Khan Sahib, and the more remote male descendants of the ruler: Sardar (personal name) Khan Sahib.

This could be further combined, e.g.:

- In Hyderabad Deccan, a state of the Nizam, every son of the ruler was fully styled Walashan Nawab (personal title), Sahibzada Mir (personal name) Khan Bahadur; in the case of the Heir Apparent, all this was followed by The Prince of Berar, with the style of His Highness, normally reserved for ruling princes with at least an 11 (later 9) guns-salute;
- In Loharu, where the Heir Apparent was Nawabzada Mirza (personal name) Khan, both the younger sons, and male descendants, of a ruling Nawab, in the male line, were styled: Sahibzada Mirza (personal name) Khan.
- In Sachin, the grandsons and other male descendants of the ruling Nawab, in the male line, were styled: Sahibzada Sidi (personal name) Khan Bahadur, while the Heir Apparent was Nawabzada Sidi (personal name) Khan Bahadur, Wali Ahad Sahib, and the other sons: Nawabzada Sidi (personal name) Khan Bahadur.
- In Bengal, male members of Muslim zamindari families with distant connections to ruling or formerly ruling royal families, were styled Sahibzada if the head of the family was called sahib. It could be affixed to more titles or family names.
  - In Murshidabad (present title-seat of the royal house of Bengal), the other sons and male descendants of the reigning Nawab, in the male line: Sahibzada Sayyid (personal name) Mirza;
- In Hangu, the grandsons of the male line of the ruling Sahib are styled as Sahibzada (personal name) Noor.

=== Wali-ahad Sahib ===
- In Palanpur, the younger sons of the ruling Nawab, and other male descendants in the male line, were styled Sahibzada (personal name) Khan; but the Heir Apparent: Nawabzada (personal name) Khan, Wali-ahad Sahib.
- In Junagadh, younger sons of the ruling Nawab and other male descendants in the male line, were styled ' Sahibzada' and (personal name) Khanji Babi.

=== Jam Sahib ===
- Jam Sahib (Gujarati: જામ સાહેબ, romanized: jam sāhēb), is the title of the ruling prince of Nawanagar, now known as Jamnagar in Gujarat, an Indian princely state.

== Colonial and modern use ==
Sahib was commonly used in the Indian subcontinent as a courteous term in the way that "Mister" (also derived from the word "master") and "Mrs." (derived from the word "mistress") is used in the English language. It is still used today in the sub-continent just as "Mister" and "Mrs." and continues to be used today by English-language speakers as a polite form of address. It was used on P&O vessels which had Indian or Pakistani crew to refer to officers, and in particular senior officers. On P&O Cruises and Princess Cruises vessels, the term continued to be used by non-Indian and non-Pakistani junior officers to refer to the senior deck and engine officers for many years, even when no Indian or Pakistani crew featured in the ship's company. It is also appended to the names of holy places associated with the Sikh gurus such as Nankana Sahib, Patna Sahib, Anandpur Sahib.

In the British Indian Army, a British officer would address a viceroy's commissioned officer (i.e., a native Indian officer) as "<rank> sahib" or "<name> sahib". In turn Indian soldiers would address British or Indian superiors with this term as a substitute for "sir". This form of address is still retained in the present-day army of independent India.

The term was applied indiscriminately to any person whether Indian or non-Indian. This included Europeans who arrived in the sub-continent as traders in the 16th century and hence the first mention of the word in European records is in 1673.

=== Memsahib ===
The authentic feminine form of Sahib is Sahiba. Under the British Raj, however, the word used for female members of the establishment was adapted to memsahib, a variation of the English word "ma'am" having been added to the word sahib.

=== Pukka sahib ===
Pukka sahib was also a term used to signify genuine and legitimate authority, with pukka meaning "absolutely genuine".

=== Literary reference ===
The term is used exclusively to refer to any white European on the Indian subcontinent, throughout Rudyard Kipling's 1901 novel Kim. Kim is ethnically a 'sahib', but was raised as a low-caste native boy. Most sahibs in the novel are British, but there is also a Russian and a Frenchman.

The term is used in a similar manner in George Orwell's essay "Shooting an Elephant", which is used to accentuate his isolation in Colonial Burma (now Myanmar), and throughout his novel Burmese Days.

The term is used throughout the children's novel A Little Princess by Frances Hodgson Burnett.

In Herman Cyril McNeile's 1920 novel Bulldog Drummond, an Indian magician was performing tricks in front of a crowd and drew attention to a mysterious box.

'You don't mean the fourth dimension, do you?' demanded a man incredulously.

'I know not what you call it, sahib,' said the Indian quietly. 'But it is the power which renders visible or invisible at will.'

Edward Morgan Forster also employed the term in his 1924 novel A Passage to India. His Anglo-Indian characters refer to the Collector as Burra Sahib, implying they respect felt for him.

The following dialogue in Dorothy Leigh Sayers's 1926 novel Clouds of Witness shows what the term implied in British society at the time.

Coroner: "What kind of a man was Captain Cathcart?"

Duke of Denver: "Well – he was a Sahib and all that. I don't know what he did before joining up in 1914. I think he lived on his income; his father was well off. Crack shot, good at games, and so on."

It is noteworthy that the character referred to had never been in India and had no connection with India.

It is used in Agatha Christie's 1934 novel Murder on the Orient Express in a similar way.

"About Miss Debenham," [Colonel Arbuthnot] said rather awkwardly. "You can take it from me that she's all right. She's a pukka sahib."

Flushing a little, he withdrew.

"What," asked Dr. Constantine with interest, "does a pukka sahib mean?"

"It means," said Poirot, "that Miss Debenham's father and brothers were at the same kind of school as Colonel Arbuthnot."

In Bruce Marshall's The World, the Flesh, and Father Smith, the protagonist serves as a military chaplain in the trenches of WWI and gives absolution to soldiers and officers about to go into battle. A major tells him: "God's a bit hard on a chap at times. Still, I am sure God's too much of a Sahib to run a fellow in for ever and ever just because he got messed up with a bit of fluff" (i.e. had casual affairs with women).

Later, the same major is mortally wounded. As the priest is about to administer last rites, the major says: "It's all right, Father; I still think God is a Sahib".

Jim Davis uses the term in a 1983 Garfield comic strip in which Garfield refers to Jon Arbuckle as "sahib" after Jon asks Garfield to retrieve his newspaper, and again in a 1989 strip after Jon asks Garfield to go outside and see if it is still raining.

The term is frequently used throughout the short stories of Robert E. Howard, mostly by Indian or Arabic characters—e.g. a Sikh manservant addresses the guests of his employer as "sahib" in The Noseless Horror.

== Musahib ==
This title (pl. musāhibān), etymologically the active part. of to associate, or consort (with), means originally companion, associate, friend (the abstract term is musāhabat); not unlike the Hellenistic-era Greek Philos and the Latin Comes in the Roman Empire, it became a title for a favourite (of a Sahib, especially a prince), and such 'personally close' positions as aide-de-camp, in some princely states even a minister.

== Other compound titles ==
- Burra sahib (Hindi: बड़ा साहब, romanized: baṛā sāhab) "big man" or important person (Burra meaning big in Hindi)
