= The Water Babies (film) =

1978 live action-animated family film by Lionel Jeffries

- Directed by: Lionel Jeffries
- Screenplay by: Michael Robson; Lionel Jeffries (additional material)
- Based on: The Water-Babies, A Fairy Tale for a Land Baby by Charles Kingsley
- Produced by: Peter Shaw executive Ben Arbeid
- Starring: James Mason; Billie Whitelaw; Bernard Cribbins; Joan Greenwood
- Cinematography: Ted Scaife
- Edited by: Peter Weatherley
- Music by: Phil Coulter
- Production companies: Ariadne Films (UK); Studio Miniatur Filmowych (Poland)
- Distributed by: Pethurst International Ltd. (UK); The Samuel Goldwyn Company (USA)
- Release date: June 23, 1978
- Running time: 105 minutes
- Countries: Poland; United Kingdom
- Language: English
- Budget: £1 million
- Box office: £61,282 (UK)

The Water Babies is a 1978 live action-animated family film directed by Lionel Jeffries and starring James Mason, Bernard Cribbins, Billie Whitelaw, Joan Greenwood, David Tomlinson, Tommy Pender, and Samantha Gates. It is very loosely based on the book The Water-Babies, A Fairy Tale for a Land Baby by Charles Kingsley.

== Plot ==
Tom is a 12-year-old orphan living in York in the mid-19th century. He is taken under the wing of Grimes, a roguish chimney sweep, as he is small enough to climb inside the chimneys. One day, they leave town and go to Harthover Hall, a huge country house set in vast grounds. Grimes rides a donkey – Tom and Grimes' assistant Masterman walk alongside.

At the house, Tom gets lost in the maze of chimneys and appears in a young girl's bedroom (Elly). Meanwhile, Grimes is passing silverware out of the windows to Masterman. When discovered by the housekeeper, Grimes blames the crime on Tom who makes a run for it with his dog Toby. They are pursued across the estate, and end up at Dead Man's Pool: a deep pool in a fast flowing river. Although the young girl protests his innocence, Tom jumps in with the dog.

The film then switches to a fantasy animation of speaking sea-creatures. Here he must help rescue his new friends, the Water Babies, from enslavement by sharks. This section includes multiple musical sequences mainly involving Jock the Scottish lobster, Terence the English seahorse and Claude the French swordfish. The story jumps to a cave in Antarctica where they join forces with Cyril the Walrus, a group of polar bears, and a flock of penguins; and also encounter the sea king Kraken also known to many as Neptune and Poseidon.

In the end, Kraken returns Tom and Toby to their world for self-sacrificing for others instead of choosing their own needs. On their world, Tom proves his innocence and helps capture Grimes. He is then adopted by Elly's family.

== Cast ==
- James Mason as Mr. Grimes
- Bernard Cribbins as Mr. Masterman
- Billie Whitelaw as Mrs. Doasyouwouldbedoneby/Old Crone/Mrs. Tripp/Woman in Black/Water Babies 'Gate Keeper'
- Joan Greenwood as Lady Harriet
- David Tomlinson as Sir John
- Tommy Pender as Tom
- Samantha Gates as Elly
- Paul Luty as Sladd

=== Voices ===
- James Mason as Killer Shark
- Bernard Cribbins as Electric Eel
- David Tomlinson as Polar Bear
- Samantha Gates as Ariadne the Water Baby
- Paul Luty as Claude the Swordfish
- Jon Pertwee as Salmon/Jock the Lobster/Kraken
- Lance Percival as Terence the Seahorse
- David Jason as Cyril the Walrus
- Olive Gregg
- Cass Allan
- Liz Proud
- Una Stubbs

== Production ==
Producer Peter Shaw read the book in 1972 and thought it would make a good film. However, he was unsure how to tackle the film technically and was concerned about how to turn the book into a script. He and writer Michael Robson took some time adapting the book. Key changes were made including adding a sidekick for the evil sweeper Grimes and having the villains get their comeuppance in the real world as well as the fantasy world.

Shaw toyed with the idea of using special effects then decided to create the underwater sequences via animation. "We had the perfect excuse," said Shaw. "The surface of the water becomes the boundary between live action and fantasy."

Shaw formed a company called Water Babies Ltd. The budget for the film was raised entirely in England, and the film was shot without a distributor.

Shaw looked into hiring animators in Hollywood, but found them to be too expensive, so made a deal with a Polish company. The Poles did the animation while the British did the story, soundtrack, working designs and characters.

Lionel Jeffries was going to direct a film version of David Copperfield with David Essex but that was postponed so in September 1976 it was announced he would make Water Babies.

The film was filmed on location in Yorkshire, England in November 1976. Primarily based at Denton Hall, Wharfedale, early scenes are filmed in the city of York. Post-production took many months, due to incorporating the animated sequences.

Costumer designer Phyllis Dalton claimed the film was ruined because "we did the on the ground Water Babies stuff in Ilkley, but they used Polish cartoons for all the underwater stuff, which I thought was awful. I think they were the wrong people to do it. I don’t think they had the sensitivity to do our Water Babies. But the rest of it was fun and Lionel Jeffries was lovely to work with."

== Reception ==
The Guardian felt the animation "that is basically the trouble.. it does not fit the original in either style or content."

The Sunday Telegraph also felt the animation "does not seem to integrate with the rest of the story" but "once to shore it [the film] comes to life."

Sight and Sound called it a "charming adaptation... with an excellent cast and surprisingly appealing animation for the underwater scenes, although the water babies themselves are in the well-worn tradition of Disney cuteness."

== Home media ==
The Water Babies was released on VHS, DVD and Bluray. The last physical format release was a Bluray released in the UK on March 21, 2016

== Books ==
Collins Colour Cubs also published four children's books based on the movie; Tom the Little Chimney Sweep, Tom Becomes A Water-Baby, Tom in The Undersea World and Tom and Ellie. In addition a novelization of the movie was published the same year as an Armada paperback (ISBN 0006914357, 9780006914358).
