= Kyauktada =

Kyauktada may refer to:

- Kyauktada Township, Yangon, Burma
- The fictional setting of the novel Burmese Days by George Orwell
