= Sidney Strube =

English cartoonist (1891–1956)

Sidney Strube (1891–1956) was a British cartoonist.

== Biography ==
He was born in Bishopsgate, London. His early career included work as a junior draughtsman with a furnishing company and as a artist of electrical equipment and lettering for a small advertising agency. He then entered John Hassall's art school. Hassall admired his caricatures and sent Strube's drawings to the periodical Conservative and Unionist (later renamed Our Flag). The editor printed four of Strube's caricatures during the January 1910 United Kingdom general election. Strube later worked as a freelance cartoonist, including drawing for the Bystander and the Evening Times.

A 1923 cartoon by Strube in the Daily Express. French Prime Minister Raymond Poincaré (the label hanging from his dress refers to the Occupation of the Ruhr) dances with his British counterpart Stanley Baldwin.

In 1912 he joined the Daily Express with an exclusive contract, where he would work until retiring in 1948. In 1933 he was offered £10,000 a year to leave the Express and join the Daily Herald but Lord Beaverbrook matched the offer to retain Strube.

In the 1930s Strube was contrasted with fellow cartoonist David Low. Stanley Baldwin admired Strube: "Strube is a gentle genius. I don't mind his attacks because he never hits below the belt. Now Low is a genius, but he is evil and malicious. I cannot bear Low".

== The Little Man ==
Strube's cartoons for the Express included his character the Little Man, the personification of the "man in the street", which appeared every day on the editorial page. The "Little Man" wore a bowler hat, carried an umbrella, and represented the hard-pressed taxpayer suffering under politicians and vested interests.

The Little Man also represented an Englishness that saw itself as modern, in contrast with the traditional John Bull figure used by cartoonists. The interwar years witnessed growth of the middle class and of the suburbs, along with the domestification of popular culture. According to Alison Light, the nation abandoned "formerly heroic...public rhetorics of national destiny" in favour of "an Englishness at once less imperial and more inward-looking, more domestic and more private". Consequently, traditional state displays of patriotism (such as the Silver Jubilee of George V) became less significant; in this context the Little Man replaced John Bull as the personification of the nation. According to Rod Brookes, Strube's cartoons represented a "modern, privatised version of British national identity defined against the archaic, aggressive, jingoistic Nationalism of European countries".

Some saw the Little Man as symbolic of Britain's post-First World War decline. George Orwell's protagonist in his 1936 novel Keep the Aspidistra Flying denounces the Little Man as a symbol of suburban mediocrity and conformity: "the typical bowler-hatted sneak—Strube's 'little man'". W. H. Auden's 1937 poem "Letter to Lord Byron" favourably contrasted John Bull to the Little Man. Auden wrote:

Ask the cartoonist first, for he knows best.
Where is the John Bull of the good old days,
The swaggering bully with the clumsy jest?
His meaty neck has long been laid to rest,
His acres of self-confidence for sale;
He passed away at Ypres and Passchendaele.

Turn to the work of Disney or of Strube;
There stands our hero in his threadbare seams;
The bowler hat who strap-hangs in the tube,
And kicks the tyrant only in his dreams,
Trading on pathos, dreading all extremes;
The little Mickey with the hidden grudge;
Which is the better, I leave you to judge.
