= Marc Wilkinson =

Australian composer and conductor (1929–2022)

Marc Wilkinson (27 July 1929 – 9 January 2022) was an Australian-British composer and conductor best known for his film scores, including Blood on Satan's Claw, and incidental music for the theatre, most notably for Peter Shaffer's The Royal Hunt of the Sun. His compositional approach has combined traditional techniques with elements of the avant-garde. After residing for most of his life in the United Kingdom, he retired from composition and lived in France.

== Life and career ==
Born in Paris, France, Wilkinson studied composition at Columbia and Princeton Universities; he also took some private lessons with Varèse in New York. He published a number of analytical articles on works by Varèse and Boulez. In England, he became one of the first independent composers to make use of the BBC Radiophonic Workshop after it opened in 1958. For a time Wilkinson was resident composer and musical director of the Royal Shakespeare Company, then musical director of the Royal National Theatre (1963–74). One of the first scores he composed in that post was for Peter Shaffer's The Royal Hunt of the Sun (1964); the result deeply impressed the playwright, who has described Wilkinson's work as "perhaps the best score for a play to be written since Grieg embellished Peer Gynt". Wilkinson subsequently wrote the incidental music to Shaffer's play Equus (1973).

Other National Theatre productions for which Wilkinson wrote incidental music included Tom Stoppard's plays Rosencrantz and Guildenstern Are Dead (1967) and Jumpers (its premiere production, 1972). He also taught at the Royal Court Theatre studio, under the directorship of Keith Johnstone, from the autumn of 1964.

Through his work at the National Theatre Wilkinson met Piers Haggard, who was working as an assistant director: the two worked together on the National Theatre production The Dutch Courtesan (1964). Having directed several TV dramas, Haggard was about to direct his first feature film and invited Wilkinson to score it. The result is one of Wilkinson's most celebrated film scores, Blood on Satan's Claw (1971), acclaimed by Jonathan Rigby in English Gothic as "easily among the best ever composed for a British horror film". Wilkinson subsequently gave crucial advice to Paul Giovanni who had been commissioned to score the film The Wicker Man.

Wilkinson and Haggard subsequently worked together on further TV and film productions, including Quatermass and The Fiendish Plot of Dr. Fu Manchu.

He died on 8 January 2022, at the age of 92.

== Selective list of works ==
=== Incidental music for theatre ===
- Richard III (Royal Shakespeare Company, 1961)
- Cymbeline (Royal Shakespeare Company, 1962)
- The Royal Hunt of the Sun (1964)
- The Storm (1966)
- Macbeth (1966)
- Rosencrantz and Guildenstern Are Dead (1967)
- As You Like It (1967)
- Three Sisters (1967)
- Love’s Labour’s Lost (1968)
- National Health (1969)
- Cyrano de Bergerac (1970)
- The Duchess of Malfi (1971)
- Jumpers (1972)
- Equus (1973)

=== Film scores ===
- If.... (1968)
- The Royal Hunt of the Sun (1969)
- The Blood on Satan's Claw (1970)
- Family Life (1971)
- Eagle in a Cage (1972)
- The Darwin Adventure (1972)
- The Triple Echo (1972)
- The Hireling (1973)
- The Mango Tree (1977)
- The Quatermass Conclusion (1979: edited down from TV series)
- Eagle's Wing (1979)
- The Fiendish Plot of Dr. Fu Manchu (1980)
- Looks and Smiles (1981)
- Enigma (1982)
- Rosencrantz & Guildenstern are Dead (1990)

=== Television scores ===
- Twelfth Night (1970 film) (TV adaptation) (1970)
- Play for Today (TV series) (1970–79)
  - "The Lie" (1970)
  - "Blue Remembered Hills" (1979)
- The Return (Short) (1973)
- Days of Hope (TV drama mini-series) (1975)
  - "1916: Joining Up" (1975)
  - "1921" (1975)
  - "1924" (1975)
  - "1926: General Strike" (1975)
- The Leopard that Changed Its Spots (nature documentary, Anglia TV 1978)
- Quatermass (TV series) (1979)
  - "Ringstone Round" (1979)
  - "Lovely Lightning" (1979)
  - "What Lies Beneath" (1979)
  - "An Endangered Species" (1979)
- Hammer House of Horror (TV series) (1980)
  - "Visitor from the Grave" (1980)
- Very Like a Whale (TV movie) (1981)
- Tales of the Unexpected (TV series) (1981–88)
  - "The Way to Do It" (1981)
  - "The Skeleton Key" (1982)
  - "The Absence of Emily" (1982)
  - "A Harmless Vanity" (1982)
  - "A Time to Die" (1988)
- The Bell (TV series: four episodes) (1982)
- All for Love (TV series) (1982–83)
  - "A Dedicated Man" (1982)
  - "Mrs Silly" (1983)
- The Case of the Frightened Lady (TV movie) (1983)
- Kim (TV movie) (1984)
- A Voyage Round My Father (TV movie) (1984)
- Coming Through (TV movie) (1985)
- Ruth Rendell Mysteries (TV series) (1987)
  - "Wolf to the Slaughter: Part One" (1987)
