= Keep the Aspidistra Flying (film) =

- Directed by: Robert Bierman
- Screenplay by: Alan Plater
- Based on: Keep the Aspidistra Flying by George Orwell
- Produced by: Peter Shaw
- Starring: Richard E. Grant; Helena Bonham Carter
- Cinematography: Giles Nuttgens
- Edited by: Bill Wright
- Music by: Mike Batt
- Production companies: BBC Films; First Independent Films
- Distributed by: First Independent Films
- Release date: 21 November 1997
- Running time: 101 minutes
- Country: United Kingdom
- Language: English
- Box office: $373,830

Keep the Aspidistra Flying (released in the United States, New Zealand, South Africa and Zimbabwe as A Merry War) is a 1997 British romantic comedy-drama film directed by Robert Bierman and based on the 1936 novel by George Orwell. The screenplay was written by Alan Plater and was produced by Peter Shaw. The film stars Richard E. Grant and Helena Bonham Carter.

== Plot ==
Gordon Comstock is a successful copywriter at a flourishing advertising firm in 1930s London. His girlfriend and co-worker, Rosemary, fears he may never settle down with her when he suddenly disavows his middle-class lifestyle and quits his paying job for the artistic satisfaction of writing poetry.

Gordon's friend and publisher Ravelston, a wealthy self-described socialist, arranges a job at a bookstore and a room in a boardinghouse for him, but Gordon seethes about the bourgeoisie values of his landlady Mrs. Wisbech and the shop's customers. He is also resentful of his romantic relationship with Rosemary remaining abstinent.

With Gordon making no progress on writing poetry, he and Rosemary take a day trip to the countryside. They become intimate in the woods, but Rosemary stops it because Gordon has not brought contraceptives. Gordon returns to his room to find a letter from a literary magazine in California that has accepted his poems for publication and sent him a check for $50 (equivalent to $1,165 in 2025). Elated, Gordon invites Rosemary and Ravelston to dinner at an expensive restaurant, where he becomes drunk and disorderly and ends up spending all his money at a pub, passing out, and being arrested and fined. The details of his arrest are printed in the paper, and he loses his job and his accommodations. Feeling sorry for himself, Gordon picks a fight with Rosemary, and she breaks up with him.

Ravelston pays Gordon's fine and finds him another job at a bookstore and lending library in Lambeth. Though his pay is much lower and his rented room squalid, Gordon is delighted in his new bohemian lifestyle. Rosemary's boss is desperate for Gordon to return, so she goes to visit him. He professes his love of his new situation, but is stricken when Rosemary correctly intuits that he is still not writing any poetry. They reconcile and have sex for the first time.

Some time later, Rosemary, who has been promoted at work, visits Gordon and tells him that she is pregnant. Gordon is presented with the choice between leaving Rosemary to a life of social shame or marrying her and returning to a life of respectability by taking back the job at the New Albion agency that he once so deplored.

After viewing medical texts about the development of the child during pregnancy, Gordon is moved to provide for Rosemary and their baby. He discards his in-progress poetry and returns to his old job, where he plagiarizes the work of famous poets for an advertising campaign that is a great success. Gordon and Rosemary marry, buy a home together, and decide to embrace middle-class life.

== Cast ==
- Richard E. Grant as Gordon Comstock
- Helena Bonham Carter as Rosemary
- Julian Wadham as Ravelston
- Jim Carter as Erskine
- Harriet Walter as Julia Comstock
- Lesley Vickerage as Hermione
- Barbara Leigh-Hunt as Mrs. Wisbech (credited as Barbara Leigh Hunt)
- Liz Smith as Mrs. Meakin
- Dorothy Atkinson as Dora
- John Clegg as McKechnie
- Bill Wallis as Mr Cheeseman
- Lill Roughley as Mrs Trilling
- Dorothea Alexander as Old Woman
- Peter Stockbridge as Old Man
- Grant Parsons as Beautiful young man
- Malcolm Sinclair as Paul doring
- Derek Smee as Lecturer
- Ben Miles as Waiter
- Richard Dixon as Head Waiter
- Eve Ferret as Barmaid

== Production ==
The title Keep the Aspidistra Flying is a pun on the socialist anthem "Keep the Red Flag Flying" but with the aspidistra houseplant instead representing middle-class English respectability.

== Reception ==
On Rotten Tomatoes, the film has an approval rating of 69% based on reviews from 29 critics.

Derek Elley of Variety magazine called it a terrific adaptation, and a "constant, often very funny delight to the ears". Elley praised the casting but was critical of the uncinematic direction. Roger Ebert of the Chicago Sun-Times gave it 3 out of 4 and wrote: "For me it works not only as a reasonable adaptation of an Orwell novel I like, but also as a form of escapism, since if the truth be known I would be happy as a clerk in a London used-book store. For a time." Lisa Schwarzbaum of Entertainment Weekly gave it a grade A−.
