= Sneh Gupta =

Kenyan actress (born 1957)

- Born: Sneh Lata Gupta; 12 May 1957 (age 68); Nairobi, Kenya
- Occupations: School executive director; Actress; producer
- Years active: 1977–present

Sneh Gupta (born 12 May 1957) is an actress and the executive director of Sucheta Kriplani Shiksha Niketan (SKSN), a residential school for students with physical challenges. She is known for her work on the British television shows Sale of the Century and Angels, as well as her role as Princess Sushila in the film The Far Pavilions. She also founded a production company.

== Early life ==
Gupta was born in Kenya on 12 May 1957, as one of five children to Indian parents. Her father was a teacher and she attended the school where he taught.

She travelled as a child in order to follow her father's teaching career. However, not wishing to get engaged and wanting her own independence, she left home aged 17 and spent a year studying in Germany before going to England.

== Acting and modelling ==
While living in Bedford after moving to the United Kingdom in 1974, Gupta initially studied to become a nurse. Saying that she did so "for a laugh", she decided to audition for Miss Anglia TV, which she won, gaining public notice in 1977. This in turn led to her becoming a hostess on the ITV gameshow Sale of the Century alongside Nicholas Parsons for a year until 1978, after which she opened a fashion boutique called Plumage in Bedford. She then tried a modelling career but gave it up, realising she could not keep it in parallel with an acting career. Debuting in Angels, Gupta proceeded to make appearances in Turtle's Progress, Lingalongamax, Crossroads, Doctor Who (1984's Resurrection of the Daleks), Kim, Tandoori Nights and Octopussy.

In 1981, she starred in An Arranged Marriage, an ITV drama about a Sikh who moved to the Midlands in the 1950s, and the arranged marriages for himself and for his daughter. The storyline was based on information from interviews with more than 250 Sikhs. Her character in The Far Pavilions engages in suttee, a scene described by Roy West in the Liverpool Echo as "one of the dramatic highlights of this spectacular series". She was a guest on Blankety Blank in 1987. Gupta presented the series Switch On To English, a quiz show for people who spoke English as a second language, in 1986, and Bol Chaal, a Hindi and Urdu language-learning programme, in 1989. In 1991, she co-hosted the magazine programme One World with Mike Shaft.

In 1987, Gupta cut her hair short as part of an attempt to avoid typecasting as a young, reserved woman but was not offered the wider range of roles that she hoped. She also formed her own production company.

== Production work ==
Gupta moved to India in 1996 where she worked on documentaries as a researcher, location manager, assistant producer and director for a variety of broadcasters.

== Executive director of SKSN ==
Gupta is the executive director of Sucheta Kriplani Shiksha Niketan (SKSN), a school for students with physical challenges and started the Indian Mixed Ability Group Events (IMAGE) programme in 2004, leading to the creation of the Indiability Foundation in 2011.
