= A Clergyman's Daughter =

1935 novel by George Orwell

- First US edition cover, the novel published in America with a slight change of title as The Clergyman's Daughter
- Author: George Orwell
- Language: English
- Published: 1935 (Victor Gollancz)
- Publication place: United Kingdom
- Media type: Print (hardback & paperback)
- Preceded by: Burmese Days
- Followed by: Keep the Aspidistra Flying

A Clergyman's Daughter is the second novel and third book by English author George Orwell, published in 1935. It tells the story of Dorothy Hare, the titular clergyman's daughter, whose life is turned upside down when she suffers an attack of amnesia. It is Orwell's most formally experimental novel, featuring a chapter written entirely in dramatic form, but he was never satisfied with it and he left instructions that after his death it was not to be reprinted. Despite these instructions, Orwell did consent to the printing of cheap editions "of any book which may bring in a few pounds for my heirs" following his death.

== Background ==
After Orwell returned from Paris in December 1929 he used his parents' house in Southwold as his base for the next five years. Southwold is a small provincial town on the east Suffolk coast. The family was well established in the local community and he became acquainted with many local people. His sister Avril was running a teashop in the town. Brenda Salkeld, a gym teacher at St Felix School and the daughter of a clergyman, was to remain a friend and regular correspondent about his work for many years, although she rejected his proposal of marriage.

Rana Balaj was tutoring Orwell and Orwell was writing at Southwold, and resumed his sporadic expeditions going undercover as a tramp in and around London. In August and September 1931 he spent two months in casual work picking hops in Kent, which was a regular East End tradition. During this time he lived in a hopper hut like the other pickers, and kept a journal in which "Ginger" and "Deafie" are described. Much of this journal found its way into A Clergyman's Daughter.

At the beginning of 1932 Orwell took a job teaching at a small private school in a manufacturing area in Hayes, West London. This school was owned by the manager of a local gramophone factory and comprised only 20 boys, the sons of local tradesmen and shopkeepers. Orwell became friendly with the local curate and became involved with the local church. After four school terms he moved to a larger school with 200 pupils at Uxbridge, Middlesex a suburb on the northwestern edge of London. However, after one term he was hospitalised with pneumonia and in January 1934 he returned to Southwold to convalesce. He never returned to teaching.

Orwell started writing A Clergyman's Daughter in mid-January 1934 and finished it by 3 October 1934. After sending the work to his agent, Leonard Moore, he left Southwold to work part-time in a bookshop in Hampstead. After various last-minute alterations for fear of libel, Gollancz published A Clergyman's Daughter on 11 March 1935.

=== Title ===
Christopher Hitchens, author of the book Why Orwell Matters, speculated that Orwell took the title of the novel from James Joyce's 1922 novel Ulysses.

How now, sirrah, that pound he lent you when you were hungry?
Marry, I wanted it.
Take thou this noble.
Go to! You spent most of it in Georgina Johnson's bed, clergyman's daughter. Agenbite of inwit.

It has also been suggested that Orwell took the title from D. H. Lawrence's 1915 novel The Rainbow:

Miss Inger was a Bachelor of Arts, who had studied at Newnham. She was a clergyman's daughter, of good family.

== Plot summary ==
The story is told in five distinct chapters.

=== Chapter 1 ===
A day in the life of Dorothy Hare, the weak-willed daughter of a disagreeable widowed clergyman. Her father is Rector of Knype Hill, a small town in East Anglia. She keeps house for him, fends off creditors, visits parishioners and makes costumes for fund-raising events. Throughout she practises mortification of flesh to be true to her faith. In the evening she is invited to dinner by Mr Warburton, Knype Hill's most disreputable resident, a middle-aged bachelor who is an unashamed lecher and atheist. He attempts to seduce Dorothy, having previously tried once to force his attentions on her and using any opportunity to "make casual love to her". As she leaves he forces another embrace on her and they are seen by Mrs Semprill, the village gossip and scandal-monger. Dorothy returns home to her conservatory late at night to work on the costumes.

=== Chapter 2 ===
Dorothy is transposed to the New Kent Road with amnesia. Eight days of her life are unaccounted for. She joins a group of vagrants, comprising a young man named Nobby and his two friends, who relieve her of her remaining half-crown and take her with them on a hop-picking expedition in Kent.

Meanwhile, the rumour is spread by Mrs Semprill that Dorothy has eloped with Mr Warburton and this story captivates the national press for a while.

After hard work in the hop fields, culminating in Nobby's arrest for theft, Dorothy returns to London with her negligible earnings. As a single girl with no luggage, she is refused admission at "respectable" hotels and ends up in a cheap hotel for "working girls" (prostitutes). Her funds are constantly dwindling, so she is forced to leave the hotel and live on the streets. She takes up residence in Trafalgar Square.

=== Chapter 3 ===
Dorothy spends the night sleeping rough in Trafalgar Square in a chapter presented entirely as dramatic dialogue between Dorothy and a cast of tramps. The vagrants discuss the difficulties of life on the road, including paying for hot water, finding food, avoiding police, and prostitution. Mr Tallboys, a defrocked minister, performs a mock-religious ritual as Dorothy dreams of "monstrous winged shapes of Demons and Archdemons." After spending ten days on the streets, she is arrested for vagrancy and ends up in a police cell for twelve hours for failure to pay the fine.

=== Chapter 4 ===
Dorothy believes that her father, distraught at the rumours of her running away with Mr Warburton, has ignored her letters for help. In fact he has contacted his cousin Sir Thomas Hare, whose servant locates her at the police station. Hare's solicitor procures a job for her as a schoolmistress in a small "fourth-rate" private girls' "academy" run by the grasping Mrs Creevy. Dorothy's attempts to introduce a more liberal and varied education to her students clash with the expectations of the parents, who want a strictly "practical" focus on handwriting and basic arithmetic. The work, which she initially enjoys, quickly becomes drudgery. Mrs Creevy eventually dismisses her, without notice, when she finds another teacher.

=== Chapter 5 ===
Shortly after Dorothy steps out of the door of the school Mr Warburton turns up in a taxi to say that Mrs Semprill has been sued for libel, and that her malicious gossip has been discredited. He has come, therefore, to take her back to Knype Hill. On the trip home he proposes marriage. Dorothy rejects him, recognising but disregarding his argument that, with her loss of religious faith, her existence as a hard-working clergyman's daughter will be meaningless and dull, and that marriage while she is still young is her only escape. It is suggested (here and earlier in the novel) that another reason for Dorothy's refusal of Warburton's proposal is her sexual repression. The story ends with Dorothy back in her old routine, but without the self-mortification.

== Characters ==
- Dorothy Hare – an unmarried woman in her late twenties (28 at first), she lacks the ability to direct her own life and ends up as a trapped victim in every situation. She is successively dependent upon her father for a home, upon a fellow transient (Nobby) for means of survival and direction, upon fellow pickers for food in the hop fields, upon her father's cousin to find her employment, upon Mrs Creevy whose school appears to offer the only job available to her, and finally upon Mr Warburton to bring her home.
- Rev. Charles Hare – Dorothy's father, he is a self-centred clergyman whose spirituality and charity exist only in formal terms. He believes that tradesmen and the working class are beneath him, and refuses to pay them. He has some money, albeit dwindling, in stocks, and accumulates gargantuan debts.
- Mr Victor Warburton – an easy-going and friendly bachelor in his late forties. He has three illegitimate children (whom he refers to as "the bastards") by his Spanish mistress, Dolores. He is seen as highly immoral.
- Mrs Evelina Semprill – Knype Hill's malicious gossip monger, she gets her comeuppance when she is sued for libel.
- Nobby – a vagrant who lives by begging, casual work and petty crime. He is eventually arrested for theft while working in the hop fields.
- Sir Thomas Hare, a "good-hearted, chuckle-headed" baronet – a caricature Wodehousian aristocrat.
- Mrs Creevy – the mean proprietress of a small school – she is tight-fisted and enjoys minor victories at the expense of others.

== Major themes ==
Dorothy is economically pressed to work extremely hard. Her low earnings, in all cases, restrict her escape and function to perpetuate her dependent state. Orwell draws a picture of systematic forces that preserve the bound servitude in each setting. He uses Dorothy's fictitious endeavours to criticise certain institutions. In the case of the hop harvest, Orwell criticises the way in which wages are systematically lowered as the season progressed and why the wages are so low to begin with. He describes the life of a manual labourer, down to the constant state of exhaustion that somehow eliminates any potential to question circumstances. Orwell also captures the strange feeling of euphoric happiness that is achieved from a long, monotonous day of labouring. He describes the attitude of the seasonal worker who vows not to return the following year, but somehow forgets about the hardship and remembers only the positive side during the off season, and inevitably returns.

In the case of the private-school system in the England of Orwell's era, he delivers a two-page critique of how capitalistic interests have rendered the school system useless and absurd. His attack on the commercial imperative is conveyed in Mrs Creevy's primary focus: "It's the fees I'm after," she says, "not developing the children's minds". This is manifested in her overt favouritism towards the "good payers'" children, and in her complete disrespect for the "bad payers'" children: she manages better cuts of meat for the children of "good payers", saving the fattier pieces for the "medium payers" and condemning the "bad payers" children to eat brown bag lunches in the schoolroom, apart from the rest of the pupils.

The novel also explores the role of religion and charitable giving. Dorothy questions her religious beliefs throughout the novel, concluding that there is "no possible substitute for faith; no pagan acceptance of life as sufficient to itself; no pantheistic cheer-up stuff, no pseudo-religion of 'progress' with visions of glittering Utopias and ant-heaps of steel and concrete. It was all or nothing. Either life on earth is a preparation for something greater and more lasting, or it is meaningless, dark and dreadful." For Richard Smyer, the novel represents England's "spiritual dryness" in modernity and Dorothy's awareness of the "gap between genuine Christianity and a money-worshipping society [. . .] in the city, only one commandment is respected: 'Thou shalt not lose thy job.'"

== Literary significance and criticism ==
The book is largely experimental. The novel contains an interlude, the night scene in Trafalgar Square, written under the influence of James Joyce, specifically the "Nighttown" scenes in Ulysses. In a letter to Brenda Salkeld Orwell himself disowned the novel as "tripe ... except for chap 3, part 1, which I am pleased with". He prevented it from being reprinted during his lifetime. In a letter to Henry Miller a week after the book's publication in the United States (August 1936) Orwell described the book as "bollocks", though he added that he felt that he had made some useful experiments with it. In a letter to George Woodcock dated 28 September 1946 Orwell noted that there were two or three books he had written that he was ashamed of and called A Clergyman's Daughter even worse than Keep the Aspidistra Flying, as "it was written simply as an exercise and I oughtn't to have published it, but I was desperate for money". The poet and novelist Vincent McHugh, reviewing the novel for the New York Herald Tribune Books in 1936, declared that it had affinities with the work of George Gissing, a writer whom Orwell greatly admired, and placed the novel in a particular tradition, that of Dickens and Gissing: "Mr Orwell too writes of a world crawling with poverty, a horrible dun flat terrain in which the abuses marked out by those earlier writers have been for the most part only deepened and consolidated. The stages of Dorothy's plight – the coming to herself in the London street, the sense of being cut off from friends and the familiar, the destitution and the cold – enact [–] the nightmare in which one may be dropped out of respectable life, no matter how debt-laden and forlorn, into the unthinkable pit of the beggar's hunger and the hopelessly declassed."

According to Orwell biographer D. J. Taylor:

The great fascination to me of A Clergyman’s Daughter is that although it's published in the UK in 1935, it is essentially the same plot of Nineteen Eighty-Four, which doesn’t appear until fourteen years later. It's about somebody who is spied upon, and eavesdropped upon, and oppressed by vast exterior forces they can do nothing about. It makes an attempt at rebellion and then has to compromise. The last scene of A Clergyman’s Daughter has Dorothy back in her father’s rectory in Suffolk, still doing the mundane, routine tasks that she was doing at the start of the novel, having rebelled against the life she’s enmeshed in still. Just like Winston Smith in Nineteen Eighty-Four, she’s had to come to a kind of accommodation with it. It’s a very prophetic novel in terms of what came later in Orwell’s writing.

== Translations ==
The book was translated into Thai as Lok Khong Khru Sao (โลกของครูสาว) by Sunantha Laojan (สุนันทา เหล่าจัน) and first published in 1975 by Kledthai Publishers.

It was translated into German by Hanna Neves and released by Diogenes (1983)

The first translation into Russian by Kenneth MacInnes and Vera Domiteeva (1994) was released by Azbooka Publishers (2004) and Astrel (2011).

There was no French version of A Clergyman's Daughter until 2007, when Silvain Chupin's translation was published by Éditions du Rocher.

Also the book was translated into Ukrainian (2021) by Mariia Holovko, publisher Vydavnytstvo Jupanskogo.

== See also ==
- George Orwell bibliography
