= The Tale of Sweeney Todd =

- Video cover
- Screenplay by: Peter Buckman
- Story by: Peter Shaw
- Directed by: John Schlesinger
- Starring: Ben Kingsley; Joanna Lumley
- Music by: Richard Rodney Bennett
- Countries of origin: Ireland; United States
- Original language: English

Production
- Producer: Ted Swanson
- Cinematography: Martin Fuhrer
- Editor: Mark Day
- Running time: 92 minutes

Original release
- Network: Showtime
- Release: April 19, 1998

The Tale of Sweeney Todd is a 1997 American crime-drama/horror television film directed by John Schlesinger and starring Ben Kingsley and Joanna Lumley. The teleplay by Peter Buckman was adapted from a story by Peter Shaw. Prior to broadcast, the film had its world premiere at the Hamptons International Film Festival in October 1997. It was broadcast in the United States by Showtime on April 19, 1998, and released on videotape in France the following month. It later was released as a feature film in select foreign markets.

== Plot ==
Set in 18th century London, the story focuses on Sweeney Todd (Ben Kingsley), a murderous barber whose business provides him with two profitable sidelines: the sale of his victims' jewelry and the disposal of their bodies to his mistress Mrs. Lovett (Joanna Lumley), who uses them to prepare meat pies for her unsuspecting clientele.

Ben Carlyle (Campbell Scott), a representative of an American jeweler, arrives in the city to track down wealthy diamond merchant Alfred Mannheim and $50,000 worth of diamonds he had sold to Carlyle's employers but failed to deliver on time. Mannheim's assistants inform Carlyle that their boss disappeared without a trace weeks earlier, and he posts notices offering a reward for information leading to Mannheim's discovery.

Charlie (Sean Flanagan), a mute orphan who works as an assistant to Todd, recognizes Mannheim as a man the barber had shaved just prior to his disappearance. Todd finds out and imprisons the boy in his basement to silence him. Meanwhile, Carlyle seeks the assistance of local policemen and an amiable serving wench named Alice, who happens to be Todd's ward, with his quest. When his suspicions about the ingredients of Mrs. Lovett's pies are all but confirmed by a chemist, he sneaks inside by hiding in a burlap sack used for her flour delivery. Upon seeing human flesh being cut up for the next batch of pies, he manages to subdue Mrs. Lovett and ties her to a meat hook, before alerting the police so she will be arrested.

Carlyle attempts to visit Todd's shop in disguise, but the barber is able to overpower him. As he prepares his instruments to torture Carlyle to death, he explains what led him to a life of murder and cannibalism. Charlie, who has managed to free himself from his shackles, stabs Todd in the back and kills him. He then frees Carlyle, who sets the building on fire before escaping with the boy. Finally, he obtains the keys to Mannheim's safe.

== Cast ==
- Ben Kingsley as Sweeney Todd
- Joanna Lumley as Mrs. Lovett
- Campbell Scott as Ben Carlyle
- Selina Boyack as Alice
- David Wilmot as Tom
- Sean Flanagan as Charlie
- Katharine Schlesinger as Lucy
- John Kavanagh as Rutledge
- Joe Savino as Chambers
- Niall Buggy as Vicar
- Peter Jeffrey as Dr. Maxwell
- Peter Woodthorpe as Mannheim

== Production ==
The character of Sweeney Todd, the Demon Barber of Fleet Street, originated in an 1846–47 penny dreadful entitled The String of Pearls. In 1847, George Dibdin Pitt adapted the story for a stage melodrama. A 1936 British film directed by George King was the first screen version. Christopher Bond's 1973 stage adaptation was musicalized by Stephen Sondheim in 1979. Schlesinger's film is a dramatic departure from the previous narratives. It dispenses with all the characters except Todd and Lovett, adds the plotline involving the missing diamonds, and offers a completely different reason for Todd's murder spree.

The Georgian era locales were filmed in Dublin, Ireland.

Prior to broadcast, the film had its world premiere at the Hamptons International Film Festival in October 1997.

== Critical reception ==
In his review in New York, John Leonard said, "Much as I’d have imagined that yet another version of The Tale of Sweeney Todd would be at best inadvisable, Kingsley... is a class-war wonder to behold... Even more of a surprise than Kingsley’s performance is that director John Schlesinger, so very serious in movies like Midnight Cowboy and Marathon Man, would have so much fun with this blackest of humors."

Daryl Miller of the Los Angeles Times stated, "It is made of seemingly high-quality elements . . . yet it falls flat because of an ill-conceived script and directorial miscalculation."

== Awards and nominations ==
Ben Kingsley was nominated for the Screen Actors Guild Award for Outstanding Performance by a Male Actor in a Miniseries or Television Movie but lost to Christopher Reeve for Rear Window.

== Home media ==
The film was released on DVD in January 2008.
