= Bookshop Memories =

1936 essay by George Orwell

"Bookshop Memories" was published in 1936 by the English author George Orwell. As the title suggests, it is a reminiscence of his time spent working as an assistant in a second-hand bookshop.

== Background ==
In October 1934 Orwell's aunt Nellie Limouzin recommended him for the job, as part-time assistant at Booklover's Corner in South End Road, Hampstead. The shop was run by her friends the Westropes, who also provided him with accommodation. He was job sharing with Jon Kimche so that he worked at the shop in the afternoons, having the mornings free to write and the evenings to socialise.

Kimche recalled Orwell never sitting, but standing in the middle of the shop "a slightly forbidding figure" who probably resented the idea of selling anything to people. Kimche retained the image of "a very tall figure almost like de Gaulle" with a small boy looking up and buying stamps from him. Peter Vansittart recalled visiting the shop as a child with the "slightly ungracious assistant" trying to sell him a copy of Trader Horn in Madagascar. Kay Ekevall, who established a relationship with Orwell after meeting him at the shop, recalled "I saw this new assistant and thought he was a great asset because he could reach all the shelves nobody else could without hauling a ladder out!"

While working in the bookshop, Orwell was working on the novel Keep the Aspidistra Flying (1936) and was able to draw on his experiences. Many commentators have pointed out that the bookshop in the novel bears little relationship to Booklover's Corner.

The essay first appeared in the November 1936 issue of Fortnightly.

== Summary ==
Orwell describes the irritating behaviour of bookshop customers - first edition snobs, oriental students, vague minded women and "the kind of people who would be a nuisance anywhere but have special opportunities in a bookshop". The shop had various sidelines including typewriters, stamps for collectors, horoscopes and Christmas novelties (Orwell was particularly amused by an invoice for these that included the phrase "2 doz. Infant Jesus with rabbits"). However, the main sideline was the lending library, which to Orwell shed a new light on readers: "In a lending library you see people's real tastes, not their pretended ones."

In conclusion, Orwell says that he would not wish to be a bookseller full-time, mainly because it is a job that tends to give one a distaste for books.

== See also ==
- Bibliography of George Orwell
