= Peter Buckman =

English writer and literary agent

Peter Buckman is an English writer and literary agent. He has been involved in the publishing industry for many years; he was on the editorial board of Penguin Books, and a commissioning editor for the New American Library in New York City. He has published novels, non fiction, a biography and short stories, and has also written for television and film, including an episode of Inspector Morse, three episodes of The House of Elliot, the television film Unnatural Causes, and the television movie The Tale of Sweeney Todd, which was directed by John Schlesinger. He is currently a literary agent, having started The Ampersand Agency in 2003, notable for having discovered and represented Vikas Swarup, author of Q & A, which was filmed as Slumdog Millionaire, and also being the agent for the estate of prolific historical fiction writer Georgette Heyer.

In 2025, Buckman began to produce a series of crime novels called "The Pumpernickel Mysteries", published under his own imprint, Word of Mouth Books. By the end of 2025, seven volumes had appeared. Pumpernickel is a black poodle owned by Leo, a Soho solicitor, whose partner is a well-known therapist, Marion, and whose oldest friend, Dennis, is a hardened crime reporter. This foursome, all in their seventies (Pumpernickel in dog-years), work together to solve a range of murders.

In an article in Bookbrunch (30 Apr 2025) Buckman affirmed: "Writing The Pumpernickel Mysteries has given me huge pleasure, because I think I've found a voice and a genre that enables me to examine the things I really care about, and people them with characters who still believe they have the potential to make things better.

== Bibliography ==
=== Fiction ===
- Playground: A Game of Fiction (1971)
- The Rothschild Conversion (1979)

The Pumpernickel Mysteries

- Dead Early (31 Mar 2025)
- Dead Honest (30 May 25)
- Dead Rich (30 Jun 2025)
- Dead Famous (30 Jul 25)
- Dead Religious (29 Aug 2025)
- Dead Unpopular (17 Oct 2025)
- Dead Festive (31 Oct 2025)

=== Non fiction ===
- The Limits of Protest (1970)
- Education Without Schools (1973) (as Editor)
- Let's Dance: Social, Ballroom & Folk Dancing (1978)
- All for Love: A Study in Soap Opera (1984)
- A Genial Senior's Companion to Ageing (2018)

=== Biography ===
- Lafayette: A Biography (1977)
