= Kim (1984 film) =

- Based on: Kim by Rudyard Kipling
- Written by: Leslie Seth-Smith
- Directed by: John Davies
- Starring: Ravi Sheth; Peter O'Toole; Bryan Brown; John Rhys-Davies; Nadira; Julian Glover
- Music by: Marc Wilkinson
- Country of origin: United Kingdom
- Original language: English

Production
- Producers: David Conroy; Jean Walter
- Cinematography: Michael Reed
- Editor: John Shirley
- Running time: 150 minutes
- Production company: London Film Productions

Original release
- Network: CBS
- Release: 16 May 1984
- Network: ITV
- Release: 26 December 1984

Kim is a 1984 British television film directed by John Davies and based on Rudyard Kipling's 1901 novel Kim. The film stars Peter O'Toole, Bryan Brown, John Rhys-Davies, Nadira, Julian Glover, Jalal Agha and Ravi Sheth in the title role.

== Plot ==
Kim is a 13-year-old street orphan in Lahore of the 19th century (1894). Kim thinks he is native, but he's actually of British origin, the son of an Irish soldier and an unknown mother (unlike the novel on which it is based, Kim's mother is not portrayed as Irish, but it is made clear that Kim is white). Kim is hired as a guide by a travelling Tibetan lama on a search for a river where Budda hurled an arrow, turning it into a place of redemption. When he finds his father's regiment and the British military discover his origins and his real name, Kimball O'Hara, he's placed in an English college. His nature, however, is opposed to the regimentation expected for the son of a British soldier, and he rebels. His familiarity with Indian life and his ability to pass as an Indian child allows him to function as a spy for the British as they attempt to thwart revolution and invasion of India. Rejoining his holy man, Kim is trained by an Englishman called Babu to become a British spy and receives orders from a British Colonel who assigns him a risky mission in the "Great Game", the behind-the-scenes struggle between Imperial Britain and Russia for supremacy in Afghanistan and Central Asia. He also befriends an astute Afghan horse-dealer named Mahbub Ali, a British Secret Service agent, who helps him with his task.

== Cast ==
- Peter O'Toole as Lama
- Bryan Brown as Mahbub Ali
- John Rhys-Davies as Babu
- Ravi Sheth as Kim
- Julian Glover as Col. Creighton
- Lee Montague as Kozelski
- Alfred Burke as Lurgan
- Mick Ford as Cpl. Bruce
- Bill Leadbitter as Gorin
- Sneh Gupta as Indra
- Roger Booth as Father Victor

== Production ==
Filming took place in October 1983.

Ravi Sheth, 15, was a Bombay resident whose father is Indian and mother is American. He moved to India at the age of 2 after being born in Milwaukee and his only previous acting experience was as Prince Charming, in a Grade 7 production of Rapunzel). "He has been an utter delight," Peter O'Toole said, "an absolute joy to work with."

The story is set in several locations filmed in India, as the Northern frontier, Lahore barracks, Bunar, Umbella barracks, Delhi, Shaharampoor and Indian mountains near the Himalayas for the final scenes of the fighting against Russian spies. There was studio filming in London.

The screenplay was essentially close to Kipling's original; much more so than the 1950 movie with Errol Flynn, except for an added subplot about the love of a deserting Scottish soldier with an Indian girl. The ending is also slightly different from the original novel, and some anachronistic snipes at the British Raj were inserted. The casting was also subject to controversy, with white actors playing local characters.

== Reception ==
The New York Times said "the plot rambles rather confusingly" and O'Toole "has a tendency to lurch about like some tipsy schoolmaster, but even he seems charmed by young Mr. Sheth" and that the film "still works nicely as family entertainment."
