= Eagle's Wing =

1979 film

- Theatrical poster
- Directed by: Anthony Harvey
- Written by: Michael Syson (story); John Briley (screenplay)
- Produced by: Ben Arbeid
- Starring: Martin Sheen; Sam Waterston; Harvey Keitel; Stéphane Audran
- Cinematography: Billy Williams
- Edited by: Lesley Walker
- Music by: Marc Wilkinson
- Color process: Eastmancolor
- Production company: Peter Shaw Productions
- Distributed by: Rank Film Distributors
- Release date: 26 July 1979
- Running time: 111 minutes
- Country: United Kingdom
- Language: English
- Budget: £2,000,000

Eagle's Wing is a 1979 British Western film made in 1979. It stars Martin Sheen, Sam Waterston and Harvey Keitel. It was directed by Anthony Harvey, with a story by Michael Syson and a screenplay by John Briley. It won the British Society of Cinematographers Best Cinematography Award for 1979.

== Plot ==
The story has three plot strands that run concurrently through the film: a stagecoach carrying a rich widow home to her family's hacienda, a war party of Native Americans returning to their village, and two fur traders waiting to meet a different group of Native Americans with whom they trade. The war party attacks the other Native Americans and kills their leader, who owns a magnificent white Arabian stallion. White Bull (Waterston) attempts to capture the horse, but it is too quick and makes off carrying the dead chief. Pike (Sheen) and Henry (Keitel) wait in vain for the traders and are then attacked themselves by the war party. Henry is killed, the Native Americans take the trader's horses, and Pike is left alone with only a mule.

Travelling alone, he comes across the funeral of the dead chief. He saves the white stallion from ritual slaughter, abandons his mule, and continues his travels. The Medicine Man conducting the ritual is accidentally killed while Pike is taking the horse. The war party finds the stage coach, attacks it, kills the driver, guard, and one of the passengers, and then leaves White Bull to ransack the coach and passengers of all valuables. White Bull gathers a hoard of jewels and other valuable items, takes a white girl for himself, and leaves the other survivors standing in the desert. One of the survivors, a priest, takes a coach horse and rides off to alert the hacienda.

The story then becomes a four-way chase. After gaining the white stallion from Pike, White Bull, the girl, the treasure and the stallion continue towards the native's village; Pike goes after the stallion; a posse from the hacienda sets out to recover the coach passengers and the girl, and members of the Medicine Man's tribe seek to avenge his death. After a series of to-and-fro adventures, the film ends as White Bull rides off alone with the stallion while Pike, utterly defeated, stands and watches him go; the girl is still behind Pike, waiting to be rescued.

== Cast ==
- Martin Sheen as Pike
- Sam Waterston as White Bull
- Harvey Keitel as Henry
- Stephane Audran as The Widow
- John Castle as The Priest
- Caroline Langrishe as Judith
- Jorge Russek as Gonzalo
- Manuel Ojeda as Miguel
- Jorge Luke as Red Sky
- Pedro Damian as Jose
- Claudio Brook as Sanchez
- José Carlos Ruiz as Lame Wolf
- Farnesio de Bernal as The Monk
- Cecilia Camacho as The Young Girl
- Enrique Lucero as The Shaman

== Production ==
=== Development ===
The film was based on a story by Michael Syson, who worked for the BBC. Director Anthony Harvey said Syson "wrote it as kind of a short story, a series of ideas with a very strong story line but not really a script."

The film attracted Harvey "as a chance to break away from the subjects I have done before, really to have complete freedom. It was a film with a very thin script in a way but it had a very strong story. It didn't have much detail and no dialogue at all, except for the first ten minutes between Harvey Keitel and Sam Waterston. It was very much a director's subject."

Harvey said "The moment I read Eagle's Wing I knew very clearly the kind of things I wanted visually, and talked to Billy Williams for days about it."

Harvey says he and John Briley sat down and wrote a script "for about a month before we went on location, just to make sense of it."

"It's about the way we spend our lives reaching for the unobtainable," said Harvey. "We search for something which is, sadly, seldom found. The impossible dream, if you like."

Financed was raised from the Rank Organisation, who made it as part of a slate of eight films with an estimated total budget of £10 million. (The others were Wombling Free, The 39 Steps, The Lady Vanishes, The Riddle of the Sands, Silver Dream Racer, Tarka the Otter and Bad Timing.) Other funds for Eagles Wing came from an investment company in Switzerland. Rank's head of leisure Ed Chilton said Rank was sold on the project not so much from the script as from Harvey's vision. "It was a very different screenplay," said Chilton. "It is for a smaller, intelligent audience and when Tony outlined his ideas I was sold. Whether the public will agree or not remains to be seen." Filmink later wrote "We cannot fathom why they [Rank] invested two million quid in... an arty Western... with a bunch of respected, non box office names (Martin Sheen, Sam Waterston in brownface as an Indian, Harvey Keitel, Stephanie Audran) and non famous director (Anthony Harvey) and odd story (everyone chasing after things)."

=== Shooting ===
The film was shot in nine weeks in and around Durango, Mexico in early 1978, finishing by April. Harvey says this was "short but we had the luxury of a small unit." Harvey said they would go "three or four hours out of" Durango. "We were looking for desolate landscapes. The movie is about loneliness and people who don't communicate... We didn't want any romantic David Lean sunsets but rather black and threatening skies." He looked for unusual landscapes that appeared "like the surface of the moon".

"Mexico is a most thrilling country to work in," said Harvey, who in August 1978 was planning on making another film there, a version of the novel Under the Volcano.

=== Post Production ===
Harvey says after filming was complete and he was on another project, Players, "the money people came in and... made a number of cuts and put back some things I had cut out."

== Release ==
The film had its world premiere at the Prince Charles Cinema in London in July 1979 and was highly acclaimed by the British press. Harvey said "the reviews couldn't have been better if I'd written them myself." The Observer called it "dazzling" and The Guardian saying it was "well worth seeing" although adding "if the film doesn't quite work, it is because it discovers what it is about a trifle too late in the day."

It opened on 26 July 1979 and finished in tenth place at the London box office with a gross of £8,316 in its first week at the Prince Charles Cinema. However the film was not a commercial success and it was a number of years before it was released in the US to varied reviews.

Alexander Walker called it "a well directed Western" which was "deemed fatally "arty" by some of the Rank executives and had difficulty getting wide bookings even in the group's own cinema chains."

According to John Briley the film was "almost universally praised" but Rank "which owns the best West End cinemas, did not even put the film in a Rank cinema. Instead it was placed in a side-street cinema that has almost exclusively shown continental sex film." Briley claims "when the reviews came out" for Eagle's Wing "a large advertising campaign was undertaken" but "the film stayed in the sex house while other Rank West End cinemas showed re-runs of Disney films." Briley accused the Rank's lack of enthusiasm for the film was due to their disbelief in British talent and a reluctance to become involved in film production again ("there has always been at Rank a lively death wish for the whole awkward business. It is so much easier selling Xerox machines and building hotels").

"We are sympathetic with the cinema owners on this one," wrote Filmink.

In February 1980 the Rank Organisation reported the losses on Eagle's Wing, The Lady Vanishes and The Riddle of the Sands would be £2-3 million, contributing to an overall loss to Rank that year of £1.5 million.

It was one of the last movies financed by the Rank Organisation.
