= Pukka sahib =

Slang term for British service people

Pukka sahib (/ˈpʌkə ˈsɑː(ɪ)b/ PUK-ə SAH(-i)b) is a slang term taken from the Hindi words meaning "substantial" (literally "ripe") and "master". Among English users, "pukka" came to signify "first class" or "absolutely genuine", so that the combined phrase could be translated as "true gentleman" or "excellent fellow". The expression was used in the British Empire exclusively to refer to White people of European extraction and frequently to describe an attitude which British administrators were said to affect, that of an "aloof, impartial, incorruptible arbiter of the political fate of a large part of the earth's surface."

The word "pukka" is still used informally in 21st-century Britain to describe something as excellent.

== See also ==
- Sahib
- Pukka Pies
