= Peter Weatherley =

British film editor

- Born: 1930; London, England
- Died: September 2015 (aged 85); Uxbridge, London, England
- Occupation: Editor
- Years active: 1956-1991 (film & TV)

Peter Weatherley (1930–2015) was a British film editor. He also worked on several episodes of the Hammer House of Horror and Hammer House of Mystery and Suspense television series.

== Selected filmography ==
- The Fur Collar (1962)
- Stranglehold (1963)
- The Desperate Ones (1967)
- The Limbo Line (1968)
- The Anniversary (1968)
- A Severed Head (1970)
- Scrooge (1970)
- The Reckoning (1970)
- Blood from the Mummy's Tomb (1971)
- Fear in the Night (1972)
- Alice's Adventures in Wonderland (1972)
- The Hireling (1973)
- Out of Season (1975)
- The Stick Up (1977)
- Alien (1979)
- Rising Damp (1980)
- George and Mildred (1980)
- Enigma (1982)
- The Boys in Blue (1982)

== Bibliography ==
- Fellner, Chris. The Encyclopedia of Hammer Films. Rowman & Littlefield, 2019.
