= Enigma (1982 film) =

1982 film directed by Jeannot Szwarc

- Theatrical release poster
- Directed by: Jeannot Szwarc
- Written by: John Briley
- Based on: Enigma Sacrifice (1978 novel) by Michael Barak
- Produced by: André Pergament; Peter Shaw
- Starring: Martin Sheen; Brigitte Fossey; Sam Neill; Derek Jacobi; Michael Lonsdale; Frank Finlay
- Cinematography: Jean-Louis Picavet
- Edited by: Peter Weatherley
- Music by: Douglas Gamley; Marc Wilkinson
- Production company: Goldcrest Films; Archerwest; M.G. Films; Peroquet
- Distributed by: Columbia-EMI-Warner (UK); CCFC (France)
- Release dates: October 15, 1982 (UK); August 3, 1983 (France)
- Running time: 122 minutes
- Countries: United Kingdom; France
- Language: English
- Budget: $8.1 million
- Box office: $894,000

Enigma is a 1982 Cold War spy film directed by Jeannot Szwarc, from a screenplay by John Briley, starring Martin Sheen, Sam Neill, Brigitte Fossey, Derek Jacobi, Michael Lonsdale, Frank Finlay and Kevin McNally. Based on Michael Barak's 1978 novel Enigma Sacrifice, the film centers on a CIA agent who tries to infiltrate Soviet intelligence in order to stop a murderous plot.

The film was a British and French co-production. It was released in the United Kingdom on October 15, 1982. Enigma received mixed reviews from critics, and was a commercial disappointment.

== Plot ==
American-born East German dissident Alex Holbeck, living in Paris, hosts a samizdat radio program aimed at Iron Curtain countries. Bodley, a CIA agent, recruits Alex to take on a dangerous assignment. Alex is sent to East Berlin on a mission to steal an Enigma code scrambler. This is part of an attempt to stop the Soviet assassination of five Soviet dissidents planned for Christmas Day. What Alex does not know is that the CIA already has a code scrambler. By stealing the scrambler in Berlin, they are trying to convince the Soviets that they do not have a copy.

On arrival in Berlin, Alex finds that the East German police and KGB knows that he is there. Alex must use numerous disguises and escape from a number of capture attempts. He seeks shelter with his former lover, Karen Reinhardt, before moving on, as it is too dangerous for her. Karen and a number of Alex's other old friends are arrested and tortured by the police in an attempt to gain information about Alex's whereabouts.

As he gets more desperate, Alex enlists Karen's help again; she seduces Dimitri Vasilikov, the KGB man in charge of the hunt for Alex, to obtain information. In the end, Dimitri catches Alex and Karen and finds the scrambler hidden in an exhibition artifact. As he is in love with Karen, he lets them go, but keeps the scrambler, which was in fact not needed. On Christmas Day, the assassination attempt is successfully thwarted.

== Cast ==
- Martin Sheen as Alex Holbeck
- Brigitte Fossey as Karen Reinhardt
- Sam Neill as Dimitri Vasilikov
- Derek Jacobi as Kurt Limmer
- Michael Lonsdale as Bodley
- Frank Finlay as Canarsky
- Warren Clarke as Konstantin
- Michael Williams as Hirsch
- David Baxt as Melton
- Kevin McNally as Bruno
- Michel Auclair as Doctor
- Féodor Atkine as The Diplomat
- Vernon Dobtcheff as Minister
- Don Fellows
- Liliane Rovère
- Billy Kearns
- Philippe Caroit

== Production ==
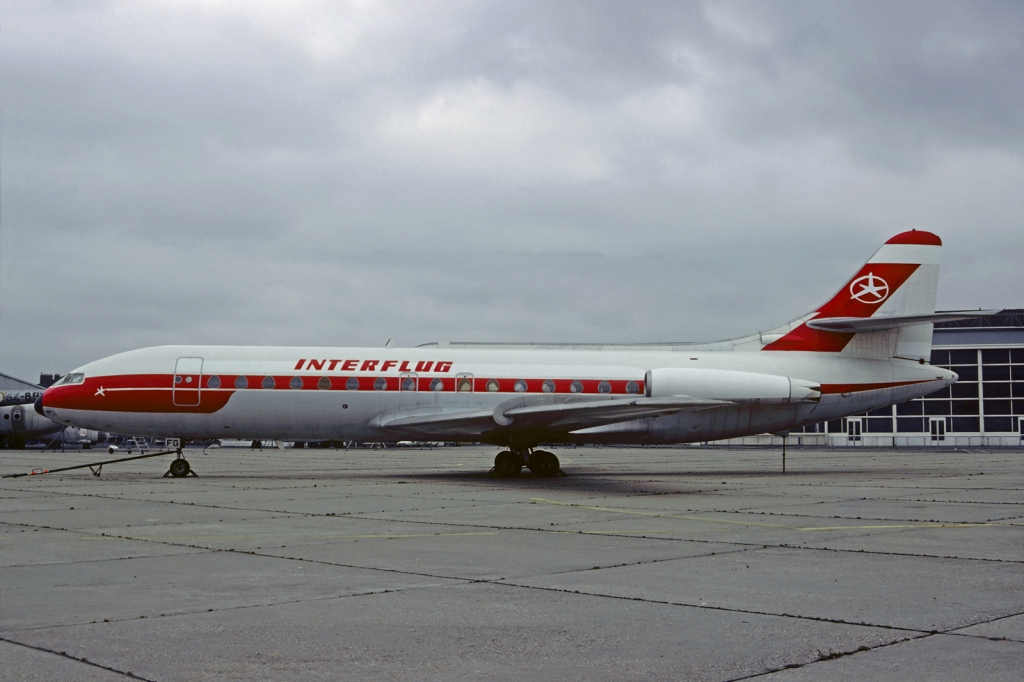
Sud Aviation SE-210 Caravelle III, part of collection of Musée de l'air et de l'espace, in fake Interflug livery for the movie Enigma.

Goldcrest Films put up $58,000 in development costs and invested £985,000 in the budget of $8.1 million. The company received £355,000, losing £630,000.

Enigma was shot partly, in 1982, at Paris–Le Bourget Airport. A scene was shot in the terminal, in the hall of eight columns, disused at the time, others on the terrace or in front of the entrance.

The aircraft in Enigma are:

- Dassault Super Mystère B.2
- Dassault Mystère IVA, F-TENN
- Dassault MD.450 Ouragan, F-TEUU
- Sud Aviation SE-210 Caravelle, F-BJTR
- Lockheed L-749 Constellation, F-ZVMV (Note: Since 1975, Le Bourget Airport has hosted the Musée de l'air et de l'espace, France's main state-owned aviation museum, and aircraft from the museum were seen in Enigma.)

Brigitte Fossey was a last-minute replacement for Lisa Eichhorn, after she had to drop out.

Michael Lonsdale's dialogue was redubbed by American voice actor Marc Smith, as the director was dissatisfied by his American accent. Lonsdale dubbed his own dialogue for the French version.

== Reception ==
Janet Maslin in her review for The New York Times, decried the "wise-guy" attitude in Enigma, writing: "There are plenty of mysteries about Enigma but they aren't necessarily the ones the film makers intended. As directed by Jeannot Szwarc, best known for Jaws 2 and Somewhere in Time, this is the spy film at its most absurdly hard-boiled and at its most icily perfunctory. It is punctuated by crisp titles (indicating the date of each scene), played very close to the vest and riddled with false alarms ..."

Film historian and critic Leonard Maltin in Leonard Maltin's Movie Guide 2013 (2012) noted a "fine cast does its best with so-so material".
