= Coming Through (1985 film) =

1985 film

- Directed by: Peter Barber-Fleming
- Written by: Alan Plater (screenplay)
- Based on: Coming Through by Alan Plater
- Produced by: Ted Childs; Deirdre Keir
- Starring: Kenneth Branagh; Helen Mirren
- Cinematography: Peter Greenhalgh
- Production company: Central Independent Television
- Distributed by: ITV
- Release date: 27 December 1985
- Running time: 80 minutes
- Country: United Kingdom
- Language: English

Coming Through is a 1985 British historical drama film directed by Peter Barber-Fleming and starring Kenneth Branagh and Helen Mirren. The teleplay about D. H. Lawrence's scandalous love affair with Frieda Weekley was written by playwright Alan Plater for the centenary of Lawrence's birth. The film was released by ITV on 27 December 1985.

== Plot ==
The film interweaves two parallel stories: the historic romance of D.H. "Bert" Lawrence and Frieda, and a modern fictional romance between university scholars. Kate, while researching the life of D.H. Lawrence, begins a flirtation with fellow academic David who tries to pick her up by showing her around Nottingham and discussing the life of Lawrence. In 1912, Bert meets Frieda, the aristocratic wife of his modern languages professor and begins a serious affair. Frieda leaves her husband and three children for Bert. Kate declines any dalliance with David and gets on a train to return home to her husband.

== Production ==
The work and life of D.H. Lawrence had been a recurring theme for playwright Alan Plater. He wrote the screenplays for The Virgin and the Gypsy (1971) based upon Lawrence's novella, and Priest of Love (1981) about Lawrence's relationship with Frieda from the World War I years until his death. Plater wrote Coming Through in honor of the centenary of Lawrence's birth. Plater said he chose 1912's meeting between Lawrence and Weekley because "this is either one of the greatest love stories of the 20th century or one of the major scandals that besmirch the fair name of Nottingham.". The title of the film is taken from Look! We have come through!, a collection of poems that Lawrence wrote about his love for Weekley.

== Cast ==
- Kenneth Branagh as D.H. Lawrence
- Helen Mirren as Frieda Weekley
- Alison Steadman as Kate
- Philip Martin Brown as David
- Felicity Montagu as Jessie Chambers
- Fiona Victory as Alice Dax
- Norman Rodway as William Hopkin
- Alison King as Sallie Hopkin
- Lynn Farleigh as Lydia Lawrence
- Malcolm Storry as Arthur Lawrence
- Robin Paul Bassford as Young Lawrence
- Benjamin Whitrow as Ernest Weekley
- Sebastian Rose as Weekley Child
- Liz May Brice as Elsa Weekley (as Elizabeth Brice)
- Camilla Aspey as Weekley Child
