= Burmese Days =

1934 novel by George Orwell

- First edition (US)
- Author: George Orwell
- Language: English
- Genre: Novel
- Publisher: Harper & Brothers (US); Victor Gollancz (UK)
- Publication date: 25 October 1934
- Publication place: United Kingdom
- Media type: Print (hardback & paperback)
- Pages: 300
- ISBN: 978-0-141-18537-8
- Preceded by: Down and Out in Paris and London
- Followed by: A Clergyman's Daughter

Burmese Days is the first novel and second book by English writer George Orwell, published in 1934. Set in British Burma during the waning days of empire, when Burma was ruled from Delhi as part of British India, the novel serves as "a portrait of the dark side of the British Raj." At the centre of the novel is John Flory, "the lone and lacking individual trapped within a bigger system that is undermining the better side of human nature." The novel describes "both indigenous corruption and imperial bigotry" in a society where, "after all, natives were natives—interesting, no doubt, but finally...an inferior people."

Burmese Days was first published "further afield," in the United States, because of concerns that it might be potentially libelous; that the real provincial town of Katha had been described too realistically; and that some of its fictional characters were based too closely on identifiable people. A British edition, with altered names, appeared a year later. Nonetheless, Orwell's harsh portrayal of colonial society was felt by "some old Burma hands" to have "rather let the side down." In a letter from 1946, Orwell wrote, "I dare say it's unfair in some ways and inaccurate in some details, but much of it is simply reporting what I have seen."

== Plot summary ==
Burmese Days is set in 1920s British Burma, in the fictional district of Kyauktada, based on Katha (formerly spelled Kathar), a town where Orwell served. Like the fictional town, it is the head of a branch railway line above Mandalay on the Irrawaddy River. As the story opens, U Po Kyin, a corrupt Burmese magistrate, is planning to destroy the reputation of the Indian, Dr Veraswami. The doctor hopes for help from his friend John Flory who, as a pukka sahib (European white man), has higher social prestige. Dr Veraswami also desires election to the town's European Club, of which Flory is a member, expecting that good standing among the Europeans will protect him from U Po Kyin's intrigues. U Po Kyin begins a campaign to persuade the Europeans that the doctor holds anti-British opinions in the belief that anonymous letters with false stories about the doctor "will work wonders." He even sends a threatening letter to Flory.

John Flory, a jaded 35-year-old teak merchant with a birthmark on his face in the shape of a ragged crescent, spends three weeks of every month acquiring jungle timber. Friendless among his fellow Europeans and unmarried, but with a Burmese mistress, he has become disillusioned with life in an expatriate community centred round the local European Club in a remote provincial town. At the same time, he has become so embedded in Burma that it is impossible for him to leave and return to England. Flory has one good friend, the Indian, Dr Veraswami, whom he often visits for what the Doctor delightedly calls "cultured conversation." But when Flory dismisses the British as mere moneymakers, living a lie, "the lie that we're here to uplift our poor black brothers instead of to rob them," he provokes consternation in the doctor, who defends the British as the efficient administrators of an unrivalled empire. Toward his mistress, Flory is emotionally ambivalent: "On the one hand, Flory loves Burma and craves a partner who will share his passion, which the other local Europeans find incomprehensible; on the other hand, for essentially racist reasons, Flory feels that only a European woman is acceptable as a partner."

Flory's wish seems to be answered with the arrival of Elizabeth Lackersteen, the orphaned niece of Mr Lackersteen, manager of the local timber firm. Flory rescues her when she believes she is about to be attacked by a small water buffalo. He is immediately taken with her and they spend some time together, culminating in a highly successful shooting expedition. Flory shoots a leopard, promising the skin to Elizabeth as a trophy. Lost in romantic fantasy, Flory imagines Elizabeth to be the sensitive object of his desire, the European woman who will "understand him and give him the companionship he needed." He turns Ma Hla May, his pretty, scheming Burmese mistress, out of his house. However, whereas Flory extols the virtues of the rich culture of the Burmese, the latter frighten and repel Elizabeth, who regards them as "beastly." Worse still is Flory's interest in high art and literature, which reminds Elizabeth of her pretentious mother who died in disgrace in Paris of ptomaine poisoning as a result of living in squalid conditions while masquerading as a Bohemian artist. Despite these reservations, of which Flory is entirely unaware, she is willing to marry him to escape poverty, spinsterhood, and the unwelcome advances of her perpetually inebriated uncle.

Flory is about to ask her to marry him, but they are interrupted first by her aunt and secondly by an earthquake. Mrs Lackersteen's interruption is deliberate because she has discovered that a military police lieutenant named Verrall is arriving in Kyauktada. As he comes from an extremely good family, she sees him as a better prospect as a husband for Elizabeth. Mrs Lackersteen tells Elizabeth that Flory is keeping a Burmese mistress as a deliberate ploy to send her to Verrall. Indeed, Flory had been keeping a mistress, but had dismissed her almost the moment Elizabeth had arrived. Elizabeth is appalled and falls at the first opportunity for Verrall, who is arrogant and ill-mannered to all but her. Flory is devastated and after a period of exile attempts to make amends by delivering to her the leopard skin. A bungled curing process has left the skin mangy and stinking and the gesture merely compounds his status as a poor suitor. When Flory delivers it to Elizabeth she accepts it regardless of the fact that it stinks and he talks of their relationship, telling her he still loves her. She responds by telling him that unfortunately the feelings aren't mutual and leaves the house to go horse riding with Verrall. When Flory and Elizabeth part ways, Mrs Lackersteen orders the servants to burn the reeking leopard skin, representing the deterioration of Flory and Elizabeth's relationship.

U Po Kyin's campaign against Dr Veraswami turns out to be intended simply to further his aim of becoming a member of the European Club in Kyauktada. The club has been put under pressure to elect a native member and Dr Veraswami is the most likely candidate. U Po Kyin arranges the escape of a prisoner and plans a rebellion for which he intends that Dr Veraswami should get the blame. The rebellion begins and is quickly put down, but a native rebel is killed by acting Divisional Forest Officer, Maxwell. Uncharacteristically courageous, Flory speaks up for Dr Veraswami and proposes him as a member of the club. At this moment the body of Maxwell, cut almost to pieces with dahs by two relatives of the man he had shot, is brought back to the town. This creates tension between the Burmese and the Europeans which is exacerbated by a vicious attack on native children by the spiteful and racist timber merchant, Ellis. A large but ineffectual anti-British riot begins and Flory becomes the hero for bringing it under control with some support by Dr Veraswami. U Po Kyin tries to claim credit but is disbelieved and Dr Veraswami's prestige is restored.

Verrall leaves Kyauktada without saying goodbye to Elizabeth and she falls for Flory again. Flory is happy and plans to marry Elizabeth. However, U Po Kyin has not given up. He hires Flory's former Burmese mistress to create a scene in front of Elizabeth during the sermon at church. Flory is disgraced and Elizabeth refuses to have anything more to do with him. Overcome by the loss and seeing no future for himself, Flory kills first his dog, and then himself.

Dr Veraswami is demoted and sent to a different district and U Po Kyin is elected to the club. U Po Kyin's plans have succeeded and he plans to redeem his life and cleanse his sins by financing the construction of pagodas. He dies of apoplexy before he can start building the first pagoda and his wife envisages him returning to life as a frog or rat. Elizabeth eventually marries Macgregor, the senior official in town and much older. She plays her role as a deputy commissioner's wife happily, in contempt of the natives who in turn live in fear of her; fulfilling her destiny as a standard bearer of the British Empire and "burra memsahib" ("wife of the big man").

== Characters ==
- John (in some editions, James) Flory: referred to as just "Flory" throughout the novel. He is the central character, a timber merchant in his mid-thirties. He has a long, dark blue birthmark that stretches from his eye to the side of his mouth on his left cheek, and he tries to avoid showing people the left side of his face as he thinks the birthmark is hideous. Whenever he is ashamed or looks down upon himself he remembers his birthmark, a symbol of his weakness. He is very friendly with the Indian Dr Veraswami, and appreciates Burmese culture. This brings him into conflict with members of the club, who dislike his slightly radical views. Because of his rather shy personality and the fact that he dislikes quarrels, he is an easy target in arguments, especially with Ellis. This discourages him from fully advocating for the Burmese. He suffers a great deal emotionally because he is infatuated with Elizabeth. All he can think about is Elizabeth but they have conflicting interests and she does not reciprocate the love. Flory supports the Burmese whereas Elizabeth regards them as beasts. Flory wants Elizabeth to appreciate him, especially with his hindering birthmark, yet he wants to support the Burmese. Due to his indecisive personality he is caught between supporting the Burmese and the English. After Elizabeth leaves Flory the second time, he commits suicide.
- Elizabeth Lackersteen: An unmarried English girl who has lost both her parents and comes to stay with her remaining relatives, the Lackersteens, in Burma. Before her flighty mother died, they had lived together in Paris. Her mother fancied herself an artist, and Elizabeth grew to hate the Bohemian lifestyle and cultural connections. Elizabeth is 22, 'tallish for a girl, slender", with fashionably short hair and wears tortoise shell glasses. Throughout the novel, she seeks to marry a man because her aunt keeps pressuring her and she idolises wealth and social class, neither of which she could achieve without a husband during this time period. When she first meets Flory, he falls in love because he values white women over Burmese women. After leaving Flory for the first time, she courts Verrall, who leaves her abruptly without saying goodbye. The second time she leaves Flory (and following his suicide), she marries Deputy Commissioner MacGregor.
- Mr Lackersteen: Elizabeth's uncle and Mrs Lackersteen's husband. Lackersteen is the manager of a timber firm. He is a heavy drinker whose main object in life is to have a "good time." However his activities are curtailed by his wife who is ever watching "like a cat over a bloody mousehole" because ever since she returned after leaving him alone one day to find him surrounded by three naked Burmese girls, she does not trust him alone. Lackersteen's lechery extends to making sexual advances towards his niece, Elizabeth.
- Mrs Lackersteen: Elizabeth's aunt and Mr Lackersteen's wife. Mrs Lackersteen is "a woman of about thirty-five, handsome in a contourless, elongated way, like a fashion plate." She is a classic memsahib, the title used for wives of officials in the Raj. Neither she nor her niece have taken to the alien country or its culture. (In Burmese Days Orwell defines the memsahib as "yellow and thin, scandal mongering over cocktails—living twenty years in the country without learning a word of the language."). And because of this, she strongly believes that Elizabeth should marry an upper-class man who can provide her with a home and accompanying riches. She pesters Elizabeth into finding a husband: first she wants her to wed Verrall, then after he leaves, Flory.
- Dr Veraswami: An Indian doctor and a good friend of Flory. He has nothing but respect for the Britons living in Burma and often makes a point of vocally expressing his support for British colonial rule when he can, even though many in the European community, including Ellis, don't respect him. Veraswami and Flory often discuss various topics, with Veraswami presenting the British point of view and Flory taking the side of the Burmese. Dr Veraswami is targeted by U Po Kyin in pursuit of membership of the European club. Dr Veraswami wants to become a member of the club so that it will give him prestige which will protect him from U Po Kyin's attempts to exile him from the district. Because he respects Flory, he does not pester him to get him admitted into the club. Eventually U Po Kyin's plan to exile Dr Veraswami comes through. He is sent away to work in another run-down hospital elsewhere.
- U Po Kyin: A corrupt and cunning magistrate who is hideously overweight, but perfectly groomed and wealthy. He is 56 and the "U" in his name is his title, which is an honorific in Burmese society. He feels he can commit whatever wicked acts he wants—cheat people of their money, jail the innocent, abuse young girls—because although, "According to Buddhist belief those who have done evil in their lives will spend the next incarnation in the shape of a rat, frog, or some other low animal", he intends to provide against these sins by devoting the rest of his life to good works such as financing the building of pagodas, "and balance the scales of karmic justice." He continues his plans to attack Dr Veraswami, instigating a rebellion as part of the exercise, to make Dr Veraswami look bad and eliminate him as a potential candidate of the club, so he can secure the membership for himself. He believes his status as a member of the club will cease the intrigues that are directed against him. He loses pre-eminence when Flory and Vereswami suppress the riot. After Flory dies, Kyin becomes a member of the European Club. Shortly after his admission into the club he dies, unredeemed, before the building of the pagodas. "U Po has advanced himself by thievery, bribery, blackmail and betrayal, and his corrupt career is a serious criticism of both the English rule that permits his success and his English superiors who so disastrously misjudge his character."
- Ma Hla May: Flory's Burmese mistress who has been with him for two years before he meets Elizabeth. Ma Hla May believes herself to be Flory's unofficial wife and takes advantage of the privileges that come along with being associated with the European community in Burma. Flory has been paying her expenses throughout their time together. However, after he becomes enchanted with Elizabeth, he informs her that he no longer wants anything to do with her. Ma Hla May is distraught and repeatedly blackmails him. Once thrown out of Flory's house, the other villagers dissociate themselves from her and she cannot find herself a husband to support her. Encouraged by U Po Kyin, who has an alternate agenda to ruin Flory's reputation within the club, she approaches Flory in front of the Europeans and creates a dramatic scene so everyone knows of his intimacy with her. This outburst taints Elizabeth's perception of Flory for good. Eventually she goes to work in a brothel elsewhere.
- Ko S'la: Flory's devoted servant since the day he arrived in Burma. They are close to the same age and Ko S’la has since taken care of Flory. Though he serves Flory well, he does not approve of many of his activities, especially his relationship with Ma Hla May and his drinking habits. He believes that Flory should get married. Flory has remained in the same reckless state that he was in upon arriving in Burma. In Ko S’la's eyes, Flory is still a boy. Ko S’la, on the other hand, has moved on with his life as he has taken wives and fathered five children. He pities Flory due to his childish behaviour and his birthmark.
- Lieutenant Verrall: A military policeman who has a temporary posting in the town. He is everything that Flory is not—young, handsome, privileged. He is the youngest son of a peer and looks down on everyone, making no concessions to civility and good manners. His only concern while in town is playing polo. He takes no notice of a person's race, everyone is beneath him. Verrall is smug and self-centered. Encouraged by her aunt, Elizabeth pursues Verrall as a suitor, but he uses her only for temporary entertainment. In the end, he vanishes from town without a word to Elizabeth.
- Mr Macgregor: Deputy Commissioner and secretary of the club. He is upright and well-meaning, although also pompous and self-important. U Po Kyin contacts Mr Macgregor through anonymous letters as he continues his attacks on Dr Veraswami to gain a position in the club. As one of the only single men left in the town, he marries Elizabeth.
- Ellis: A spiteful and violent racist who manages a timber company in upper Burma. He is a vulgar and rude member of the club who likes to stir up scandals. Ellis firmly maintains that the Burmese people are completely incapable of ruling the country themselves. His hatred of the Burmese culture causes some clashes with Flory due to Flory's friendliness with the Burmese, especially Dr Veraswami. Ellis is in support of U Po Kyin's plan to ruin the reputation of Dr Veraswami and needs no evidence whatsoever of Dr Veraswami's guilt.
- Francis and Samuel: Francis is a Eurasian clerk to an Indian money lender, whilst Samuel is a clerk to some of the pleaders. Both are sons of Christian missionaries, the book explores attitudes towards their mixed heritage.

== Background ==
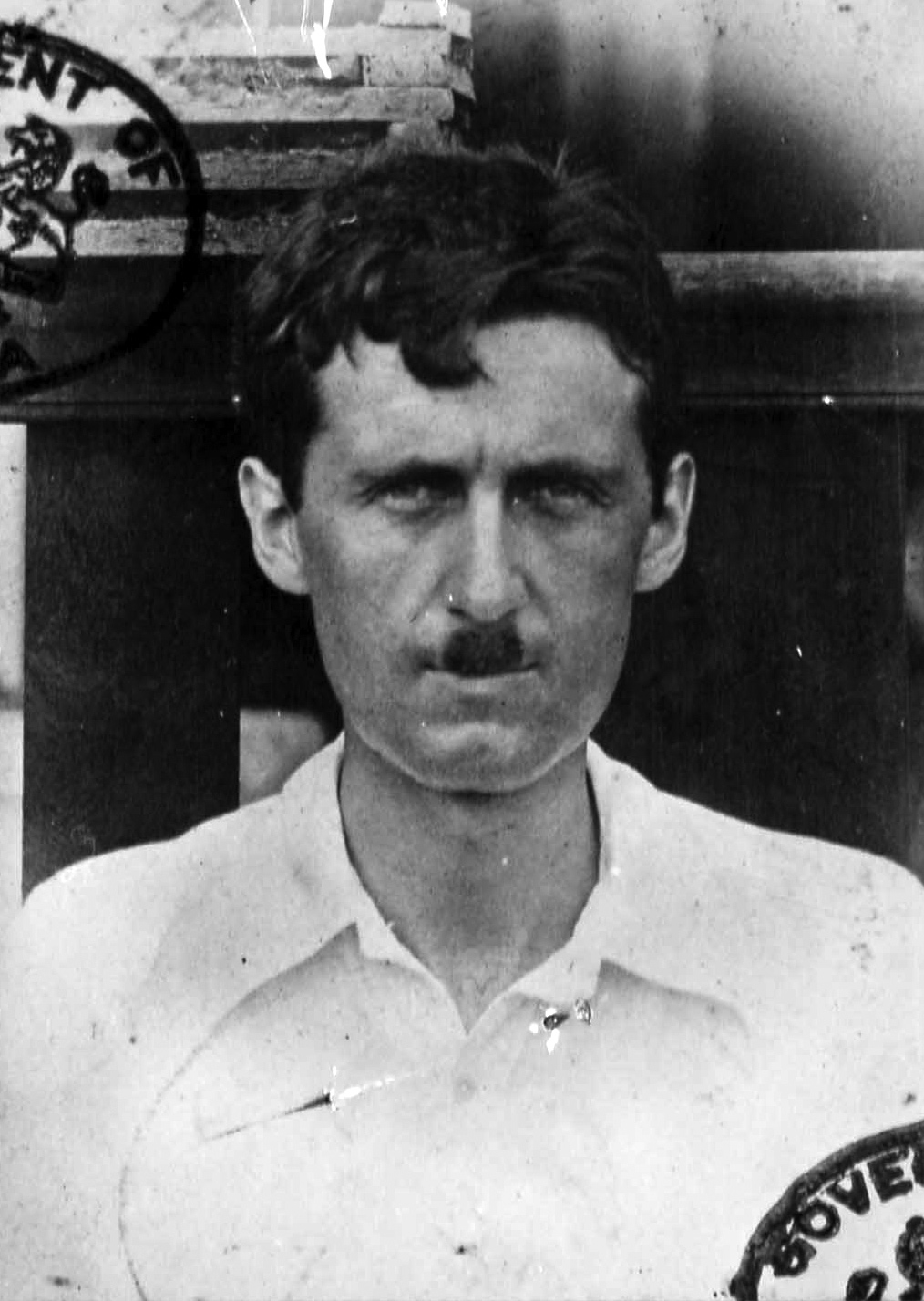
A passport picture of George Orwell from his time in Burma

Orwell spent five years from 1922 to 1927 as a police officer in the Indian Imperial Police force in Burma (now Myanmar). The British had gradually annexed Burma in stages, and it was not until 1885, when they captured the royal capital of Mandalay, that Burma as a whole could be declared part of the British Empire. Migrant workers from India and China supplemented the native Burmese population. Although Burma was the wealthiest country in Southeast Asia under British rule, much of the wealth was in the hands of Europeans. As a colony it was seen very much as a backwater. Under the British administration, the people of Burma were at the bottom of the social hierarchy, with Indians, Chinese, and Christianised minorities in the middle and Europeans at the top.

The image which Britons were meant to uphold in these communities was a huge burden and the majority of them carried expectations all the way from Britain with the intention of maintaining their customs and rule. Among its exports, Burma's up-country forests produced 75 per cent of the world's teak. When Orwell came to the Irrawaddy Delta in January 1924 to begin his career as an imperial policeman, the delta was Burma's leading exporting region, providing three million tons of rice annually, half the world's supply. Orwell served in a number of locations in Burma. After a year of training in Mandalay and Maymyo, his postings included Myaungmya, Twante, Syriam, Moulmein, and Kathar. It also included Insein, situated north of Rangoon, the site of the colony's most secure prison, and now Myanmar's most notorious jail.

Burmese Days was several years in the writing. Orwell drafted it in Paris from 1928 to 1929. He revised it in 1932 at Southwold while doing up the family home during the summer holidays. By December 1933 he had typed the final version, and in 1934 delivered it to his agent, Leonard Moore, who submitted it to Victor Gollancz, the publisher of Orwell's previous book. Gollancz, already fearing prosecution from having published another author's work, turned it down because he was worried about charges of libel. Heinemann and Cape turned it down for the same reason. After demanding alterations, Harper & Brothers was prepared to publish it in the United States, where it appeared in 1934. In the spring of 1935, Gollancz declared that he was prepared to publish a British edition provided Orwell could demonstrate he had not named real people. To that end, extensive checks were made in colonial lists before Gollancz brought out the English version on 24 June 1935. Nonetheless, many of the main European names appearing in the novel have since been identified in the Rangoon Gazette as belonging to real people, with the name "U Po Kyin" in particular belonging to a Burmese officer who was at the Police Training School in Mandalay with Orwell.

== Style ==
Orwell biographer D. J. Taylor notes that "the most striking thing about the novel is the extravagance of its language: a riot of rococo imagery that gets dangerously out of hand."

Another of Orwell's biographers, Michael Shelden, notes that Joseph Conrad, Somerset Maugham and E. M. Forster have been suggested as possible influences, but believes also that "the ghost of Housman hangs heavily over the book." The writers Stansky and Abrahams, while noting that the character Flory probably had his roots in Captain Robinson, a cashiered ex-officer whom Orwell had met in Mandalay, "with his opium-smoking and native women", affirmed that Flory's "deepest roots are traceable to fiction, from Joseph Conrad's Lord Jim through all those Englishmen gone to seed in the East which are one of Maugham's better-known specialities."

Jeffrey Meyers, in a 1975 guide to Orwell's work, wrote of the E. M. Forster connection that, "Burmese Days was strongly influenced by A Passage to India, which was published in 1924 when Orwell was serving in Burma. Both novels concern an Englishman's friendship with an Indian doctor, and a girl who goes out to the colonies, gets engaged and then breaks it off. Both use the Club scenes to reveal a cross-section of colonial society, and both measure the personality and value of the characters by their racial attitudes...But Burmese Days is a far more pessimistic book than A Passage to India, because official failures are not redeemed by successful personal relations."

Orwell himself was to note in Why I Write (1946) that "I wanted to write enormous naturalistic novels with unhappy endings, full of detailed descriptions and arresting similes, and also full of purple passages in which my words were used partly for the sake of their sound. And in fact my first complete novel, Burmese Days...is rather that kind of book."

== Themes ==
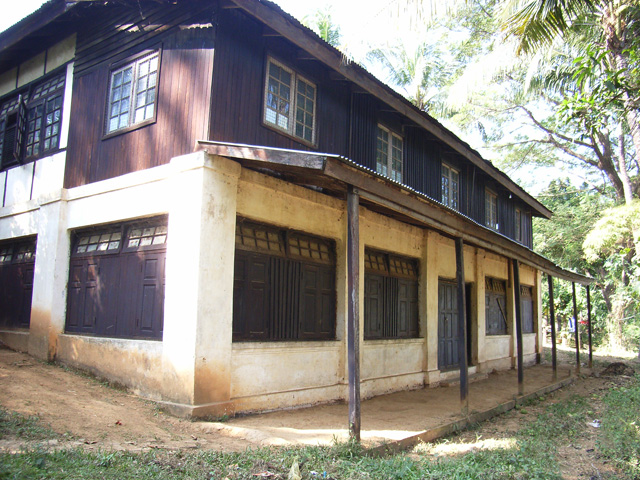
The former whites-only British Club in Katha, upon which the club in the novel was based

=== Colonialism ===
Each of the characters in the novel hold differing views towards colonialism, influenced by their background and status in society. According to University of Singapore scholar Steven L. Keck, the novel's depiction of colonialism led it to become "a part of the mythology of imperial experience not only for Burma, but for the British Empire as a whole." Burmese Days takes place during a period of Burmese history when it was under British colonial rule, and Orwell intended the novel to serve as a critique of colonialism, both in the effects it had on the Burmese and the British. Colonial society in Burma is depicted as being divided on racial lines, "with [the Europeans] exploiting both the land and peoples of Burma, while finding that the cost of exile and isolation was to fight a continuous battle against despair"; the Burmese and Indians, on the other hand, are depicted as both supportive and opposed to colonial rule. Keck speculated that the fact that the Saya San peasant rebellion was ongoing during the period influenced Orwell's pessimistic attitude towards colonialism.

Burmese Days frequently uses characters in the novel to illustrate larger arguments about colonial rule. When Flory, someone who had grown disillusioned with colonialism, enters into a debate with Dr Veraswami about British colonial rule, each makes several points about the effects of colonialism in Burma. Flory charges that the British are only interested in Burma due to the economic opportunities the colony provides, and are living a "lie that we're here to uplift our poor black brothers rather than to rob them." Dr Veraswami counters that British rule has improved Burma, pointing to the levels of infrastructure, healthcare and education in the colony. Veraswami also notes how if it were not a British colony, he would not have been able to become a doctor in Burma. Their argument continues, but are unable to come to an agreement and ends inconclusively.

The novel also explored the status of Burma as being part of the British Raj instead of being a separate colony. Burmese scholar Maung Htin Aung, in an article written about Burmese Days, claimed that the novel served as a "valuable historical document" due to the fact that it "recorded vividly the tensions that prevailed in Burma, and the mutual suspicion, despair and disgust that crept into Anglo-Burmese relations as the direct result of the Government of India Act leaving out Burma from the course of its reforms."

=== Isolation ===
The character of Flory, a Pukka sahib, serves as an emblematic depiction of the isolation faced by the European community in colonial-era Burma, a topic Orwell also explored in his short story Shooting an Elephant. He is torn between his fascination with Burmese culture, which sees him attempt to befriend several Burmese, and his role as a colonial teak merchant (ensuring that, as a member of the ruling class, he can never become intimately familiar with such a culture). He also defends the Burmese and sympathises with various issues they face in the argument with Dr Veraswami, confirming his disillusion with colonialism which isolates him from the European community. Flory aims to satisfy both the Burmese and the Europeans while ultimately pleasing neither, further confirming his isolation.

=== Racism ===
The theme of racism frequently appears in Burmese Days, being depicted in the interactions between the three primary ethnic groups in Burma: the Europeans, Indians and Burmese. The European gentleman's club, in which Flory spends a significant portion of the novel, holds a debate on whether or not to admit a "native" (referring to Burmese people) into the club, with the violent and spiteful racist Ellis immediately objecting and declaring that he will never share a club with "natives." Racism remains a strong theme throughout the novel, with the European community in Burma frequently expressing racist attitudes towards the Indians and Burmese they interact with. In the view of Keck, the depiction of racism in Burmese Days has been cited by numerous historians "as a means to explore some of the more important features of modern history."

== Reactions ==
Harpers brought out Burmese Days in the US on 25 October 1934, in an edition of 2,000 copies. In February 1935, just four months after publication, 976 copies were remaindered. The only American review that Orwell himself saw, in the New York Herald Tribune, by Margaret Carson Hubbard, was unfavourable: "The ghastly vulgarity of the third-rate characters who endure the heat and talk ad nausea of the glorious days of the British Raj, when fifteen lashes settled any native insolence, is such that they kill all interest in their doings." A positive review however came from an anonymous writer in the Boston Evening Transcript, for whom the central figure was, "analyzed with rare insight and unprejudiced if inexorable justice", and the book itself praised as full of "realities faithfully and unflinchingly realised."

On its publication in Britain, Burmese Days earned a review in the New Statesman from Cyril Connolly as follows:

Burmese Days is an admirable novel. It is a crisp, fierce, and almost boisterous attack on the Anglo-Indian. The author loves Burma, he goes to great length to describe the vices of the Burmese and the horror of the climate, but he loves it, and nothing can palliate for him, the presence of a handful of inefficient complacent public school types who make their living there... I liked it and recommend it to anyone who enjoys a spate of efficient indignation, graphic description, excellent narrative, excitement, and irony tempered with vitriol.

Orwell received a letter from the anthropologist Geoffrey Gorer as follows

Will you allow me to tell you how very much indeed I admire your novel Burmese Days: it seems to me an absolutely admirable statement of fact told as vividly and with as little bitterness as possible.

It was as a result of these responses that Orwell renewed his friendship with Connolly, which was to give him useful literary connections, a positive evaluation in Enemies of Promise and an outlet on Horizon. He also became a close friend of Gorer.

Twelve years after its publication, Edmund Wilson mentioned the book favourably in a review of Animal Farm in The New Yorker: "There is a novel of [Orwell's] called "Burmese Days," a title deceptively suggestive of reminiscences by a retired official, which is certainly one of the few first-hand and really excellent pieces of fiction that have been written about India since Kipling.... This book ... attracted, so far as I remember, no attention whatever when it came out over here, but it ought certainly to be republished...."

In 2013, the Burmese Ministry of Information named the new translation (by Maung Myint Kywe) of Burmese Days the winner of the 2012 Burma National Literature Award's "informative literature" (translation) category. The National Literary Awards are the highest literary awards in Burma.
