= Robert Bierman =

English film and television director

Robert Bierman is an English film and television director. He began his career directing commercials and short films before making the transition to directing feature films and television dramas.

Bierman was originally scheduled to direct The Fly (1986), but due to personal tragedy was unable to commit to the project. In 1989 he directed Vampire's Kiss. He has directed episodes of Waking the Dead, The Inspector Lynley Mysteries, The Bill and Holby City.

He has three children from his first marriage and three daughters from his second marriage to Saskia Wickham.

== Filmography as director ==
- The Dumb Waiter (1979)
- The Rocking Horse Winner (1983)
- Apology (1986)
- Vampire's Kiss (1989)
- The Moonstone (1996)
- Keep the Aspidistra Flying (1997)
- The Blonde Bombshell (1999)
- Victoria Meets (2012)
