= Drill team =

Type of team

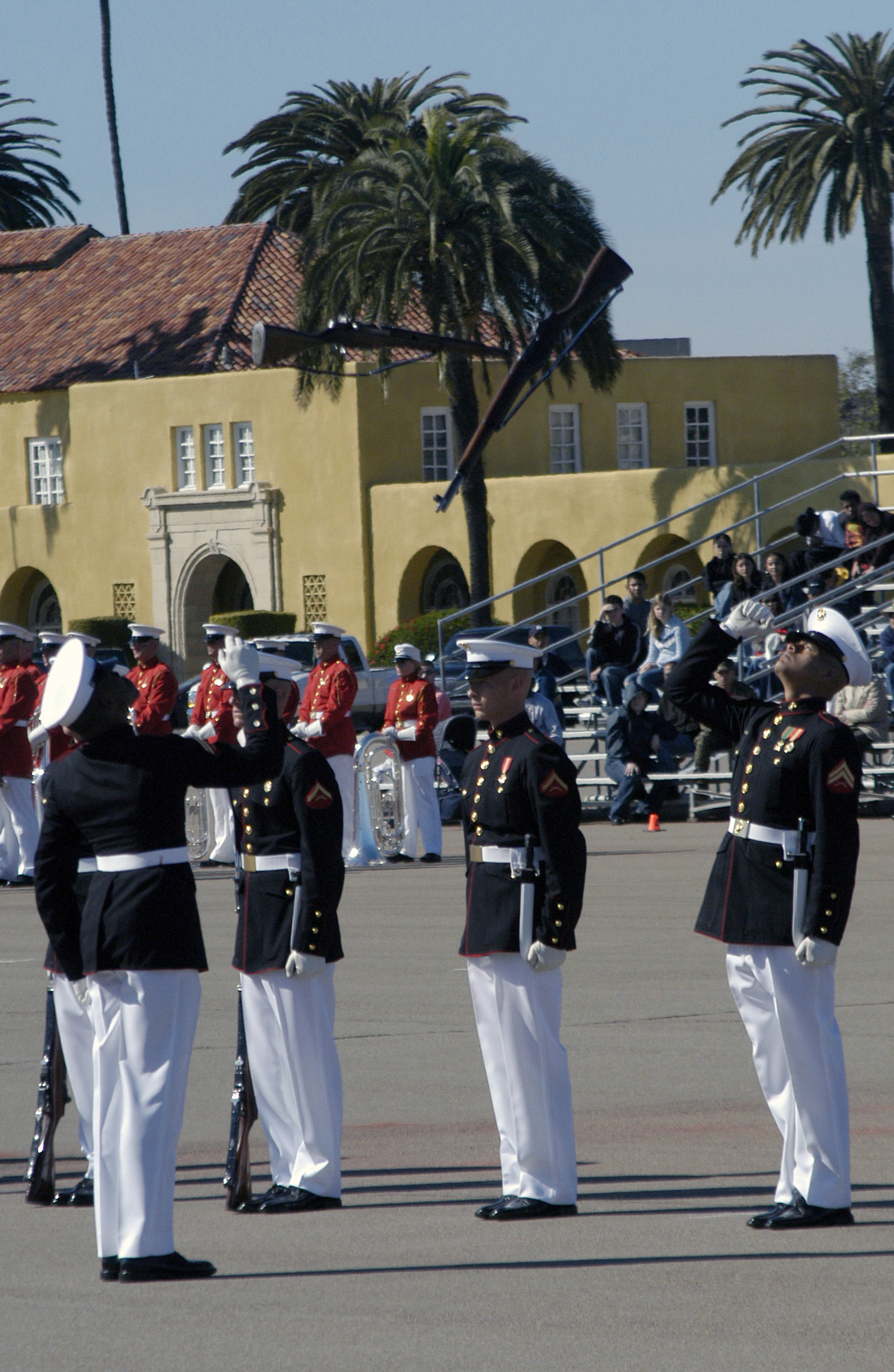
The U.S. Marine Corps Silent Drill Platoon performs the rifle inspection routine in front of spectators seated in the Reviewing Stands during the Battle Colors Ceremony held at Marine Corps Recruit Depot San Diego, California.

A drill team can be one of four different entities:

1. A military drill team is a marching unit that performs routines based on military foot or exhibition drills. Military drill teams perform either armed or unarmed.
2. A dance drill team creates routines based on precision dance movements rather than military drill. These teams usually do not carry anything, but may use props in field production numbers. They may perform to recorded music, or the live music of an accompanying marching band.
3. A team that execute routines carrying either one or multiple flags or pom-poms. This team's movements are also based in dance and may also have a heavy influence of gymnastics as well. These teams also may perform to music, either live or recorded.
4. A team that is mounted (horse, motorcycle, etc.) or advances some type of mobile object (library carts, lawn chairs, or even garbage bins). May also include teams of dogs and handlers.

== Military/police drill team ==
A military drill team is a marching unit that performs routines based on military drill. These teams often perfect their proficiency and then choose to compete against other programs. These competitions are generally called "drill meets", and are held all across the world.

=== Canada ===
The Canadians have the Canadian Cadet Organization, which consists of the Royal Canadian Sea Cadets, Royal Canadian Army Cadets, and the Royal Canadian Air Cadets, all of which have drill competitions throughout the year which are hosted by the Regional Cadet Support Units.

Canadian drill competitions consist of the following aspects:

- Fall in
- Drill Team dress and deportment
- Drill Team Commander's dress and deportment
- Compulsory drill procedures at the halt
- Compulsory drill procedures on the march
- Drill performance in a precision routine (optional)

Drill units in the Canadian Army include the Ceremonial Guard and the 2nd Battalion, Royal 22e Régiment in the Primary Reserve and the Regular Force respectively. The Royal Military College of Canada also maintains a 24-member drill team. The RCMP Musical Ride is the only mounted drill team of its kind in the world.

=== Greece ===
The Hellenic Navy has a precision movement unit called Άγημα Κινήσεων Ακριβείας (Agima Kiniseon Akriveias). It is made up of conscripts and also takes part in the "Μεικτός Λόχος Απόδοσης Τιμών" (Meiktos Lohos Apodosis Timon/Mixed Guard of Honour), a tri-service guard of honour composed of servicemen from the Hellenic Army, the Hellenic Navy, and the Hellenic Air Force is maintained as part of the Ministry of National Defence.

=== India ===
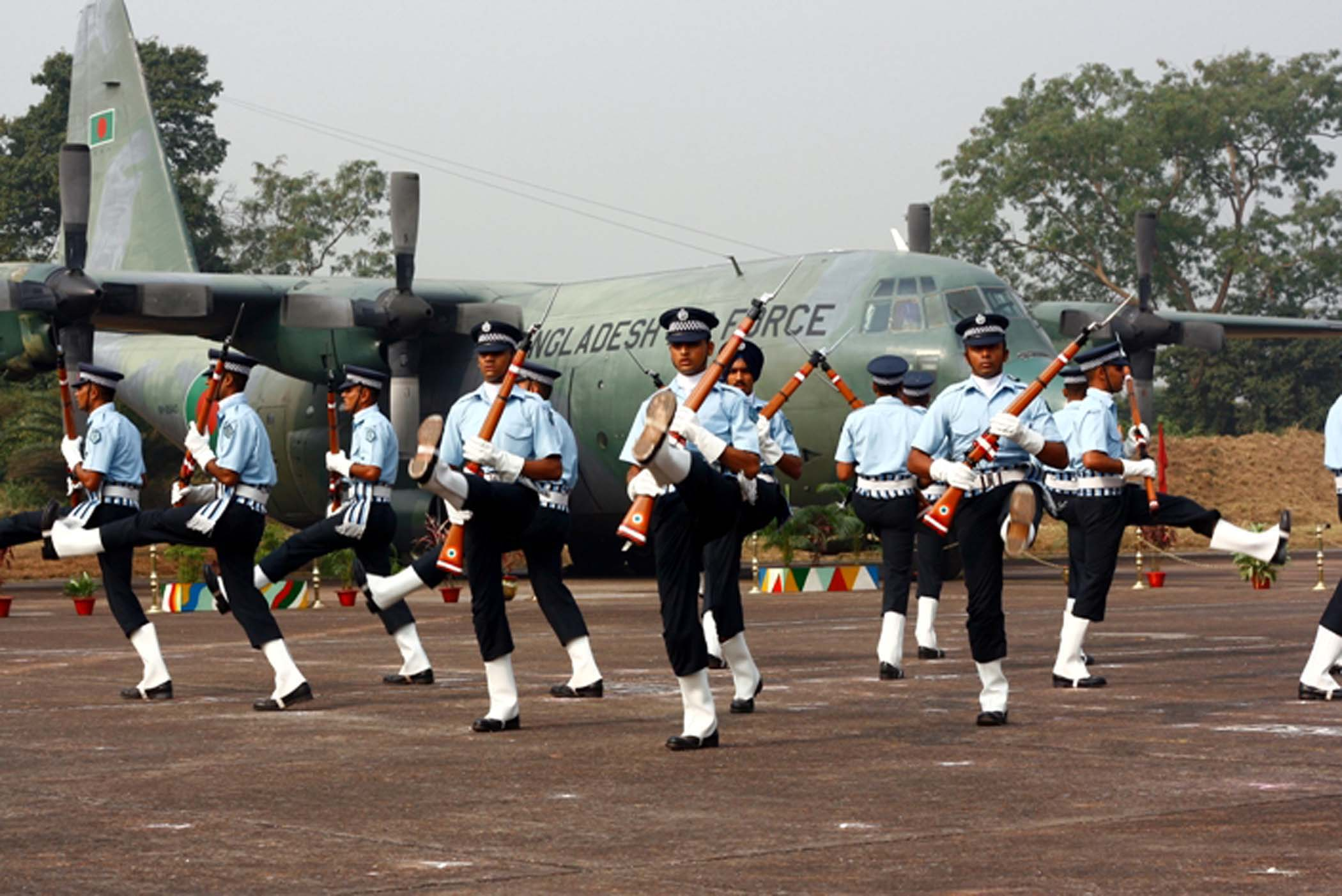
The AWDT performing at (BAF) Base Dhaka, 7 December 2009.

In the Indian Armed Forces, there is currently one unit that is serves as exhibition drill team. This unit, known officially as the Air Warrior Drill Team (AWDT), was founded in 2004 as part of the Indian Air Force. They commonly perform during the Air Force Day Parade at Tezpur Airport on 8 October.

=== Malta ===
The Armed Forces of Malta Drill Team and the Malta Police Precision Drill Team serve as the only military drill units in the Republic of Malta. The platoon-sized AFM Drill Team has performed synchronized drill since its revival in August 2014, and is based on the British and Canadian procedures for military drill and exhibition drill. The Malta Police Precision Drill Team, on the other hand, has been performing drill for more than 25 years prior to the establishment of the AFM team. Unlike the AFM team, who carry the FN FAL on parade, the police team carries a Short Magazine Lee–Enfield Mk VI. The platoon consists of 21 policemen, who are selected from the various sections of the Malta Police. Their main appearances include the Malta Military Tattoo and the Republic Day on St. George's Square.

=== Norway ===
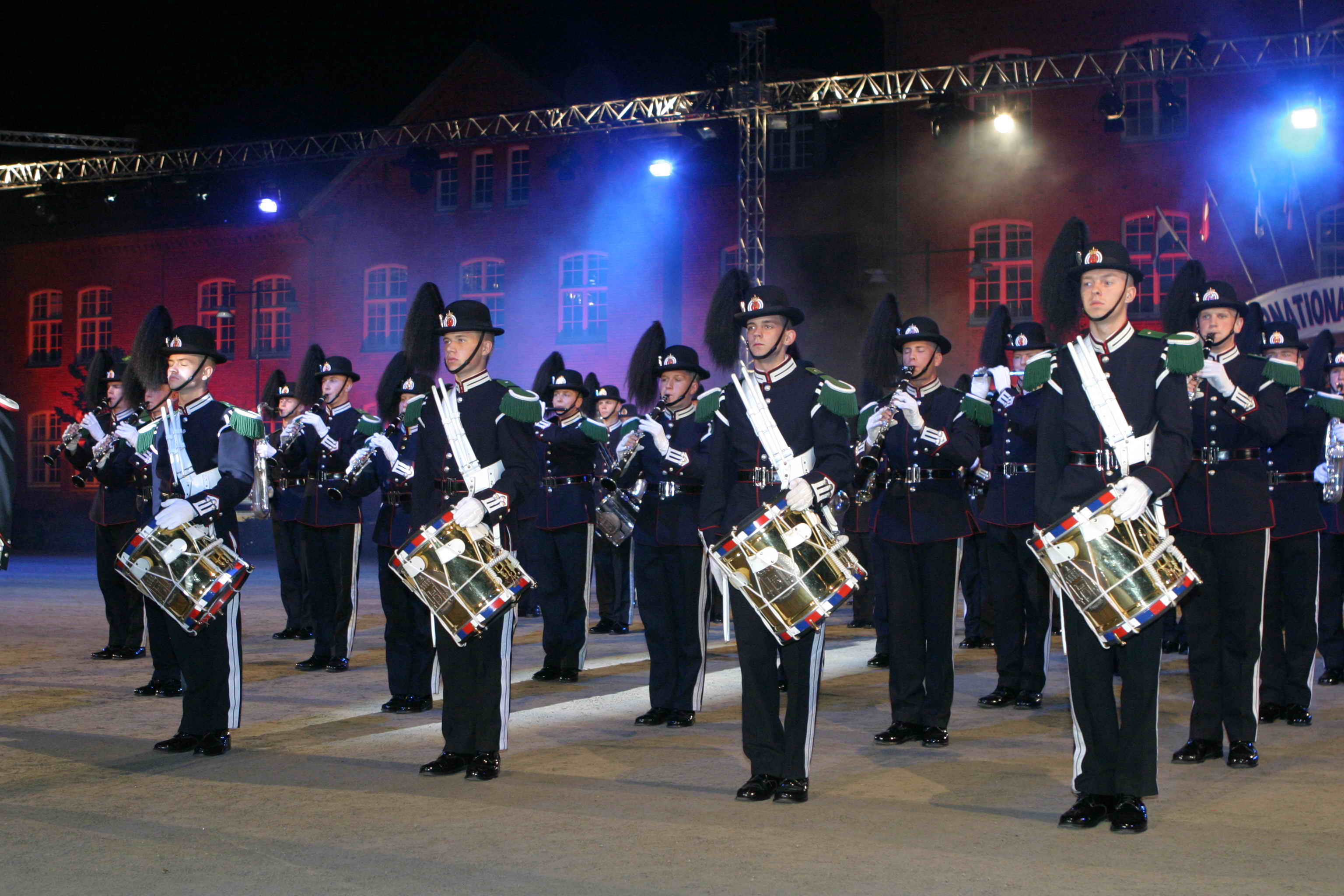
Musicians of His Majesty the King Guard band and drill team (Norway)

The Norwegian military consist of only one single company sized drill team, consisting of a band and a drill platoon. The team is one of five infantry companies that are assigned the mission to protect His Majesty the King of Norway and the royal family, as well as guarding the Royal Palace. The 3rd company, HMKG are also used to represent the Norwegian armed forces at state-related matters such as state-visits, ceremonies, national festivities, and were also prominent in the Winter World Cup 2010 as guards. As of 2012, His Majesty the King's Guard is also responsible for the safety and defence of the city of Oslo, in case of a national crisis. A total of six companies make up His Majesty The King's Guard (Hans Majestet Kongens Garde), and is a part of the Norwegian army.

The band is hand picked through interviews and playing tests prior to the draft date. The band consists of signal horns, a drumline, a pit and the main band. Most of the members year goes to practising and basic military training as the year is a part of their military service. The band is probably the only troop that almost never have "green" duty (as in field duty). Also, the band never stand guard at the castle nor the other guarding posts around Oslo, neither does the drill platoon.

The drill platoon consists of 32–40, first-year servicing soldiers. These are all hand picked through a rigorous selection process that lasts from their drafting at the start of October till December. The soldiers go through basic military training as well as having to learn how to march, weapons drill, and how to perform synchronically. Throughout the selection process, the soldiers have to prove themselves worthy a spot on the drill team, as these soldiers will be representing not only the King's guard, but also the Norwegian military and the Norwegian state both national and internationally. Everything in their daily duty from the bed, room, facilities, closets, uniforms, and physique needs to be at excellent standards 24/7. These women and men strive for perfection in all that they do and are often seen running around the various woods nearby the base as well as working out at the gym. Every year, these soldiers finish their service with one of the highest average physical results in the army. Their uniforms are spotless and wrinkleless, in addition their boots are so well polished that you can literally reflect yourself in them. As opposed to what one might think, these soldiers draft year have been compared to as even harder than what the first-year service in the special forces is. Though most likely not as hard physically, the mentality and the pressure in being the best of the best puts these soldiers under a tremendous amount of pressure every hour of every day, every day of the year. Their rigorous training results in being one of the best drill teams in the world.

The band and drill platoon (3rd company) is the only drill team that have been invited to the legendary Royal Edinburgh Military Tattoo nine times, 2012 being the most recent.

=== Russia ===
The Russian Armed Forces maintains many ceremonial drill units in its ranks, with the drill platoons in the 154th Preobrazhensky Independent Commandant's Regiment and the Kremlin Regiment being the seniormost among them. Drill units in Russia set the precedent for units of that nature in and around the Commonwealth of Independent States (CIS), especially in countries such as Belarus, Armenia, and Turkmenistan.

=== Singapore ===
The Silent Precision Drill Squad of the Singapore Armed Forces Military Police Command (SAFMPC) is the sole drill unit of the Singapore Armed Forces that performs Exhibition drill. It is usually seen leading the contingent of new guards from the SAFMPC towards the Istana in the daily Guard mounting ceremony. It is also seen at the annual National Day Parade (NDP). The National Cadet Corps and National Police Cadet Corps also sport drill units, usually performing at school events competitions, or open houses. These units are known as Precision Drill Squads, a type of drill unit which executes rifle drill in complex series of movements with co-ordination and precision.

=== United States ===
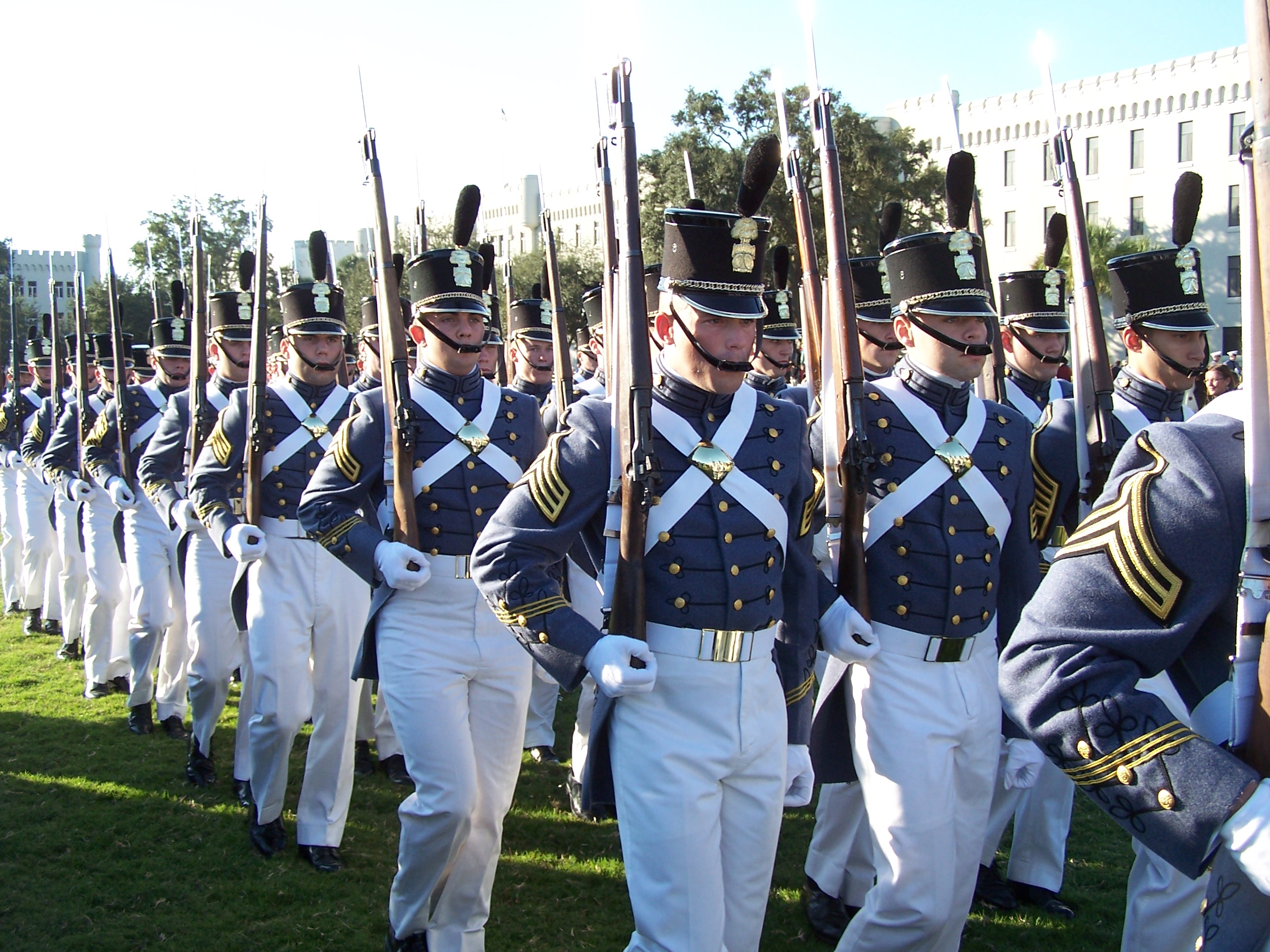
The Citadel, The Military College of South Carolina's elite senior drill platoon, The Summerall Guards, performing their signature combination of Prussian high-step and German close-order drill

All of the United States military service branches have an official drill team part of their respective service honor guard. The service academies have drill teams, as well as many college and university ROTC (Reserve Officer Training Corps) and high school JROTC (Junior ROTC) units. Additionally, many community-based organizations such as the Army Cadet Corps, Naval Sea Cadets, Young Marines, and Civil Air Patrol maintain military drill teams. Formerly, some of these units were called Crack Squads.

==== The drill meet ====
A drill meet is a competition for military-style drill teams. The US military's honor guard units have drill teams; however, they do not compete against each other in a drill meet such as this. The only exception to this is Pro America where individuals compete, but not the full drill teams. US high school JROTC and college ROTC teams often compete against each other.

The top American bladed (bayonet-only) independent drill meet was Pro America and the top American independent armed drill meet is the Isis World Drill Championships for post high school professional exhibition drillers in the nation. The same concept is also applied to various police departments and agencies. Junior Reserve Officers' Training Corps (JROTC) programs may also compete in the National High School Drill Team Championships held in Daytona Beach, Florida. There are two divisions for competing, Unarmed, and Armed. During the summers, most drill teams go to drill camps to hone their skills. Also see high school "military" drill teams in high school. Washington, Idaho, California.

At the college level, teams may compete in the Mardi Gras Invitational Drill Meet hosted by Tulane University and the Cornell University Invitational Drill Meet (CUIDC).

===== Phases =====
Each meet has different phases:

Many drill meets differ regarding what events are offered and what divisions of competition are presented. Drill meets generally include both an armed and unarmed divisions. Events offered generally include several different phases: inspection, color guard regulation drill, and, in addition, (drill based on a service's drill manual) an exhibition drill in which they march intricate maneuvers along with manipulating equipment including rifles, sometimes with fixed bayonets.

- Inspection (I) : Each team goes through a standard military inspection for an up-close critique of their bearing, knowledge and overall appearance.
- Regulation drill (RD) : A fixed list of verbal commands, armed or unarmed from a service's drill and ceremonies manual (see also Military parade), given by a single cadet commander. This cadet commander must memorize these commands at most every meet and the team must perform these movements as per regulations.
- Exhibition drill (XD) : XD is based in RD, but is then infused with a Driller's imagination. XD has different categories:
  - Solo/one-man (A single driller)
  - Tandem/two-man (2 drillers)
  - Small team (4–8 drillers) (Note: this category replaces tetrad and squad)
  - Platoon/flight (9–26 Drillers)
- Color guard regulation drill (CGR): The military color guard is not to be confused with a marching band's color guard (see Color guard (flag spinning) for more information), although music-related color guards have their roots in the military version. This is similar to the drill team RD phase in that there is a fixed list of commands from a service's drill and ceremonies manual that the cadet commander must memorize and execute with his/her color guard unit. Units are often required to "case" (commands required to cover the colors for transport/storage), and/or "uncase" (commands required to uncover the colors for competition/display) as a part of the competition.

===== Weapons =====
Each of the above phases can be marched by an armed (with a military sword, saber, or rifle) or unarmed team. NOTE: Many drill meets allow the use of a sword in the unarmed division, but never a rifle of any kind. All drill teams can march a guidon.

- Standard drill team rifles in the United States are the M1 Garand, M14, or the M1903 Springfield rifle. Armed teams usually use a demilitarized version of the rifle or a facsimile, which may be light-weight for spinning (such as for marching show band use).
- Unarmed teams concentrate on varied body and arm movements with intricate steps. Armed teams then add manipulation of the equipment, known as "manual of arms" in regulation drill events.

===== Judging =====
The current system used almost all military drill competitions includes multiple military judges each looking at the unit as a whole while they are competing at differing angles. These judges then grade every aspect of the performance on their own score sheets. This grading is based strictly on the military drill manuals in use for the meet (i.e., Army TC 3-21.5, Marine Corps Order P-5060.20, Air Force Manual 36–2203, etc.) Using this evaluating technique closely parallels what most of these individuals have done throughout their military careers at various levels throughout their training (most of these evaluators come from military training facilities and/or base honor guards). Judges score teams within ranges from POOR, to AVERAGE, to EXCEPTIONAL. Most meets using this system have a "Judge's Notes" section where judges are either encouraged or required (depending on the meet) to write some candid notes for the team to utilize to interpret the numerical scores delivered on the score sheets.

== Dance and semi-military teams ==
=== United States ===
==== Texas ====
Dance drill teams evolved from early pep squads and military-style drum and bugle corps that performed in the stands and/or during halftimes at football games.

Gussie Nell Davis, originally from Farmersville, Texas, laid the groundwork for what would eventually become the world famous Kilgore College Rangerettes located in Kilgore, Texas the world's first precision drill team when she created the "Flaming Flashes" pep squad at Greenville High School in 1929. Starting with simple marches, stunts, and letter formations, Davis led the Flashes to evolve into a dynamic squad, adding twirling batons, basic dance moves, and ultimately becoming a precision drum and bugle corps with help from a band director in Port Arthur, Texas. This foundational experience shaped her vision, and in 1940, Davis brought her expertise to Kilgore College, where she created the Rangerettes, the first-ever collegiate drill team. The Rangerettes set new standards in precision dance and halftime entertainment, becoming iconic in Texas and beyond, with their influence reaching far beyond high school and college drill teams.

Kay Teer Crawford, a high school cheerleader in the Rio Grande Valley during the early 1930s, had an idea of forming a team from the girls who were not selected for cheerleader. After graduating from college, Kay returned to Edinburg High School to teach physical education and to direct the Sergeanettes in 1936. They marched on the field with a "military swing" style, and eventually evolved into an acclaimed precision dance group. Crawford is equally noted with Gussie Nell Davis as having started the "drill team" concept, but it was Crawford who later started the national dance competition industry.

In 1939, the president of Kilgore College, Dean B.E. Masters, contacted Gussie Nell Davis about coming to Kilgore, Texas, to start a group that would "be interesting and keep the folks in their seats at half-time." They also needed to recruit women to the school since the enrollment was primarily made up of men who were seeking to learn more about the oil business. Dr. Masters was not quite sure what he wanted, but he knew he did not want a traditional drum and bugle corps. He wanted something new, something that did not yet exist, and left the decisions up to Miss Davis.

Miss Davis created the "Rangerettes" to perform at Kilgore College football game halftimes. The Rangerettes almost immediately became the gold standard for all teams, both high school and college, and almost all Texas drill teams now consist of a line of performers with the officers in front of the team leading them in at every game.

In Tyler, Texas, just 30 miles from Kilgore, the second college drill team to be created in Texas was the Tyler Junior College Apache Belles in 1947. A fierce but friendly rivalry between the Apache Belles and the Rangerettes developed quickly, and continues to this day.

Much like Miss Davis, Barbara Tidwell, a former Kilgore College Rangerette, was recruited by Southwest Texas State University (now Texas State University) in 1960 to create the "Strutters", the first drill team at a four-year college.

There are over a thousand high school drill teams in the state of Texas today with over 30,000 students participating every year. The traditional uniform for these teams usually consists of a white hat with white boots. The officers of the teams also typically wear an all white uniform, while the line members wear school colors. Teams perform visual routines, usually in the style of kick, prop, military, or pom, at football games, both in the stands during the game, and on the field at halftime. During the spring, teams often perform at basketball game halftimes, and compete in many different dance styles at competitions sponsored by dance and drill team companies. Also in the Spring, teams put on a "Spring Show," similar to a recital, to showcase all of the dances they competed at competitions to the school and community. The finale consists of a traditional kick routine in their school uniforms.

Traditionally, Texas high school drill teams have been all female, but males have auditioned and been selected to teams in recent years.

==== California ====
The first dance-drill teams in California were school affiliated. Teams in California now typically identify as either a pep squad, drill team, dance team, dance-drill team, or dance company. But these affiliations began to widen greatly as parks & recreation programs, independent performing arts programs, and dance studios opened across the state in the late 1980s and developed their own dance-related programs. More traditional drill teams march in parades with school marching bands during the fall/winter, perform field shows (halftime shows) at athletic events, and compete at indoor dance/drill competitions during the late-winter and/or spring seasons.

After moving from Texas to California following her collegiate studies, drill team founder Dr. Kay Teer Crawford eventually started the world's first national precision dance-drill team competition in 1967: Miss Dance Drill Team USA (aka U.S. Nationals & Pageant, MDDTUSA). In 1981, Crawford also created the world's first international dance competition: Miss Dance Drill Team International. The U.S. National dance competition and world championships are now held annually in Southern California.

But there are now numerous drill team & dance team competition circuits in California (i.e. Miss Dance Drill Team USA, Varsity/USA/UDA, CADTD, Sharp International, NRG etc.). And while most current school-affiliated teams do not compete on the festival level, those that do are consistently adjudicated in the following areas as developed by Dr. Kay Teer Crawford (Different competition circuits place different point/percentage weight on the importance of each of the following three areas in determining a final score):

- Routine choreography
- Technical execution
- Showmanship

There are also quite a variety of categories in which a team can compete. Examples are as follows:

- Jazz
- Lyrical
- Contemporary
- Military
- Kick
- Hip Hop
- Pom/songleader
- Character
- Novelty
- Prop
- Dance-drill
- Co-ed dance
- Show production

Unlike other states where schools are placed in separate divisions based on their school attendance size (as associated with state-organized athletic organizations), no such affiliation currently exists in California because dance is not considered an athletic sport. As a result, competition divisions are sub-divided into size of the performance group in a given routine, with teams allowed to compete in as many sizes as they wish:

- Small
- Medium
- Intermediate
- Large

All teams are adjudicated on a point system, with total points deciding ordinal rankings in determining winners.

==== Washington ====
In Washington state, the phrase "drill team" usually refers to high school performance/spirit teams that compete in the "drill" and/or "military" category at local, regional and statewide "dance/drill" competitions. Drill routines (sometimes referred to as "drills") typically entail (indeed some argue should entail):

- highly regimented procedures for entering and exiting the stage;
- precise symmetry and/or spacing in the team's formations (a.k.a. line straightness);
- precise transitions between formations that do not compromise line straightness;
- perfect or near-perfect synchronization and sharpness in the teams' marching and other bodily movements; and
- interesting music selection.
- (Many drill teams incorporate kicklines into their routines; many other successful drill routines have been accomplished without them.)

Judging is currently known as ordinal judging and ratings categorized by superior, exceptional, excellent, and good.

The WIAA Dance/Drill competition is the annual championship event for qualified dance and drill teams held annually in the last weekend of March.

A Washington drill team member, or "driller", is not a dancer, but a dancer can be a driller. Since the foci of drill are presentation and spatial precision, drillers do not necessarily need attributes typically ascribed to dancers, such as a high level of flexibility (although this is a large portion of what many teams exhibit in their routines and part of their score) or an aptitude for expressing emotions with the body. This generally allows for larger team sizes, with most teams having about 20 or more members.

==== Utah ====
In Utah, most 3A, 4A, 5A, and 6A schools have a drill team. This sport is incredibly competitive in this state, probably due to the high number of dancers. Tryouts are normally held the school year before the performing season during the months of April and May, giving teams the entire summer to work on their technique. During this time, drill teams often attend a dance camp to learn small dances to perform at school events such as sports games and assemblies. Along with these shorter routines, teams also learn longer and more technical competition routines to compete at a few invitational competitions and later a regional competition. The teams that place at the top at region (usually the top 4) go to state to compete against other teams in other regions.

Performed dance styles include military, kick, character, lyrical, hip hop, pom, jazz, and officer, among others.

Every year at region and state competitions, teams compete in military and dance, and every other year, compete in kick or character.

- Dance - Dance routines feature technique and performance above all. Teams are judged on their precision, flexibility, leaps, turns, kicks, and other skills such as projection, facials, vocals, and visuals.
- Military - Military is a unique style and surprising at first. Military routines use intricate formations, walking patterns, arm sequences, kicks, and drop splits, and require the team to appear as one person, every move being incredibly precise and sharp. Facials are typically intense or neutral, and the music is usually instrumental. It is typically part of a marching ensemble, or marching band.
- Kick - A kick routine is all about legs. The majority of the routine is kicking, either in a line, partnership, or alone. Scores are based on the number of kicks in the routine, how together they are, how high they are, and how straight and pointed the legs and feet are.
- Character - Character is about becoming a certain person, thing, or idea and performing as such. Technique is still a priority like in other styles, but it must be done as the character. Teams are judged on how well they fit the persona, use any props, their technique, and their performance as a whole in the way of projection and facials.

== See also ==
- Ceremonial Guard
- Dance squad
- Equestrian drill team
- Pep flags
- Marching girls
- Foot drill
- Military parade
- Cadet Kelly
- Exhibition Drill
- Pershing Rifles
- Blue Ridge Rifles
- Reserve Officers' Training Corps
- Honor guard
- Broom brigade
- Majorette
