= Ida Weis Friend =

- Born: June 30, 1868; Natchez, Mississippi
- Died: September 22, 1963 (aged 95); New Orleans, Louisiana
- Occupations: Suffragist, philanthropist, progressive activist
- Years active: 1919-1963
- Notable work: First woman delegate from Louisiana to Democratic National Convention (1920); President, National Council of Jewish Women (1926-1932); Lifelong community leader in New Orleans

Ida Weis Friend (1868–1963) was a suffragist, philanthropist and lifelong advocate for progressive causes in New Orleans. In 1920, she became the first woman from Louisiana to serve as a delegate to the Democratic National Convention. (At that convention, Franklin Delano Roosevelt was nominated as the vice presidential candidate.)

In 1946, Friend received the Loving cup award from The Times-Picayune newspaper in honor of a lifetime of civic activism. The Loving Cup is prestigious local community service award that "recognizes residents who have worked unselfishly for the community without expectation of public acclaim or material reward." In her acceptance speech, she said: "I have always thought that citizenship was a privilege that carried with it responsibilities, primarily, as our spiritual leaders tell us, that ‘we are our brothers’ keepers.’ And therefore we should promote in every way possible the progress and prestige of the community in which we live."

== Personal life ==
Ida Weis was the third of seven children born to Caroline Mayer Weis and Julius Weis, whose families were early Jewish settlers in the American South. In 1845, Julius Weis had immigrated from Bavaria, Germany, to Natchez, Mississippi. He began working as an itinerant peddler, then opened dry-goods stores and ultimately became a successful cotton broker in New Orleans. In 1882, the family moved to Europe for 18 months for educational purposes. Ida Weis studied at Fräulein Singer's school in Frankfurt and at Madame Yeatman's school for young ladies in Neuilly, France, becoming fluent in both German and French.

Ida Weis began her activism at the age of 15, raising money for Touro Infirmary, a Jewish hospital in New Orleans. In 1890, she married Joseph Friend, a Yale graduate; together they had four children.

Their son Julius Weis Friend was an editor of The Double-Dealer, a short-lived but influential New Orleans literary magazine (1921-1925) that published many up-and-coming modernist writers. Among its contributors were novelist Sherwood Anderson, poet Amy Lowell, avant-garde feminist novelist Djuna Barnes as well as, early in their careers, novelists Ernest Hemingway and William Faulkner. The Double Dealer had an unusual number of women contributors and also published African American writers, including poet Jean Toomer.

In 1924, Ida Weis Friend's son Henry "Bunny" Friend died at age 18. In his memory, she donated funds to create the Bunny Friend Playground in the 9th Ward of New Orleans. In 2015, the playground was the site of a mass shooting incident in which 17 people were injured.

Ida Weis Friend is described in her elder years in the memoir My New Orleans, Gone Away, by Peter M. Wolf. The book cites her efforts to collect money, food and books for Jewish refugees during World War II; in 1946, the American Red Cross honored her efforts with a national award.

Her brother Samuel Washington Weis, a graduate of Phillips Exeter Academy (1888) and MIT (1892), was a sketch artist and entrepreneur. In 1906, he became president of Ilg Electric Ventilating Company, a producer of military and industrial fans in Chicago.

== Career ==
From 1919 to 1921, Ida Weis Friend advocated for a government-supported network of ethical businesses, including a woman-owned cooperative grocery store. She worked through both the New Orleans Housewives League and city government.

Also at that time, she campaigned for Louisiana to ratify the 19th Amendment, giving women the right to vote. Ultimately, however, Louisiana voted against the amendment. Friend was active in the Era Club of New Orleans, a suffrage and service organization whose name was an acronym: Equal Rights for All.

In 1921, she was one of two women delegates to Louisiana's constitutional convention. The resulting 1921 Constitution of Louisiana gave the state power to regulate working conditions and wages for women and girls. Friend later campaigned to get the state's minimum employment age raised from 14 to 16.

She was founder of the New Orleans Hadassah, serving as its first president, from 1917 to 1920. She also led the local chapter of the service organization B'nai B'rith; the chapter was later named after her. From 1926 to 1932, she served as president of the National Council of Jewish Women.

Friend was also active in civil rights, serving in 1932 as a member of the Commission on Interracial Cooperation. In 1938, she helped found the New Orleans chapter of the Urban League, an organization dedicated to civil rights and economic empowerment.

In the 1940s, she was a leader in the "Broom Brigade," a group of women seeking to clean up New Orleans City Hall. In 1946, the Brigade helped elect a reform candidate for mayor, "Chep" Morrison (deLesseps Story Morrison). They then influenced Morrison to advocate for their progressive agenda. (The name referred to the Broom brigades of the 19th century, when women performed military-style exercises using brooms instead of rifles.)

At her death in 1963 at age 95, Friend was still active, serving as president of the board of directors of the New Orleans Home for the Incurables (now the John J. Hainkel, Jr. Home and Rehabilitation Center), a nursing facility founded in 1891 by a group of by New Orleans women.

Ida Weis Friend's papers are held by Howard-Tilton Memorial Library at Tulane University.
