= Pep flags =

Performing art of twirling flags

Pep flags, also known as flaggies, short flags, small flags, or twirl flags, is the performing art of twirling one or two flag(s) as part of a choreographed routine. In the early 21st century, some school flag squads have implemented a third or even fourth flag in routines. This performing art is mainly prominent in Southern California high schools. It is mainly in high schools but a few are in elementary, middle school, and college/university levels.

Although pep flags has been around for many decades (and has evolved much since then), it has been gaining in popularity around the world. This particular style of pep flags has spanned out to other areas in Northern California and Nevada and has been known to have similar styles in Colorado, Florida, Georgia, Illinois, Louisiana, Massachusetts, Ohio, Pennsylvania, South Carolina, and Wisconsin. Twirling has also reached other countries such as Australia, Canada, Hungary, Japan, South America, St. Kitts, and the United Kingdom.

Depending on the place, pep flags may be classified with baton (flag baton), majorettes or precision/prop. Usually, pep flags is often associated with cheerleading, as it is one of the main aspects of school spirit: cheerleading, songleading/pom pom, mascots, and pep flags. Not to be confused with auxiliary or colorguard, pep flags is a separate discipline. However, much like other auxiliary and spirit teams, pep flags takes much hand and eye coordination, athleticism, showmanship, and overall teamwork and good sportsmanship. Many flag routines involve choreography to music, dance/cheer elements (such as kicklines, pyramid mounts, etc.), numerous combinations of twirls, flag tricks, and flag tosses (also known as exchanges).

Many schools that have a pep flag squad can generally be seen performing at school pep rallies, football games (pre-game, half-time, or even along the sideline with the cheerleaders), and cheering at other sporting events during the fall. Some may be seen marching with their school's marching band during parade season. In the Northern Hemisphere spring, teams compete in several indoor competitions against other schools. Some of the main competitions that occur are United Spirit Association (USA) Regionals and Nationals, Miss Dance Drill Team USA, and Sharp competitions, as well as smaller school-sponsored competitions throughout the Southern California area. Generally, these competitions have two separate divisions for one-flag and two-flag routines. In addition, they may also include solo, duet, and trio divisions as well.

== Schools ==
- Adolfo Camarillo High School
- Arapahoe High School
- Arcadia High School
- Bell High School
- Bishop Montgomery High School earned the Championship titles at Miss Dance Drill Team USA in 1986 (2-Flag), 2014 (both 1-Flag and 2-Flag ), 2017 (1-Flag), and the International Championship titles in 1986 and 1990. Bishop Montgomery also won USA Nationals in 1997 and was also one of the first schools to have a male compete at USA Regionals 2006.
- Cabrillo High School
- California Academy of Math and Science (CAMS)
- Carnegie Middle School is the first and only actively competing middle school pep flags program in competition (as of 2010). Although its existence has been sporadic over the years, their competition history can be traced back to the early 1980s, making them the original junior high school competition pep flags squad. Carnegie has enjoyed a recent revival, which began in 2008. They also inspired other spin-off pep flag programs and in the 1990s were referenced in a touring show of a Japanese touring acting troupe.
- Carson High School is the second school to "three-peat" at USA Nationals (2004, 2005, 2006) and are also the originators of twirling three and four flags. Also first and only school to win both 1-Flag and 2-Flag divisions in the same year and consecutively (2005 and 2006). Carson is also known for their "show-off" line. They earned back-to-back wins at USA Nationals in both 1- and 2-Flag divisions in 2005 and 2006. Carson did not compete at USA Nationals in 2007 and 2011. They also brought much publicity to pep flags when they were featured in Gwen Stefani's "Hollaback Girl" video in 2005. First team to earn a championship trophy for 2-Flag after an award ceremony (USA Nationals 2017).
- Channel Islands High School is the first school to "three-peat" four times at USA Nationals — three times in 2-Flag (1986, 1987, 1988; 2001, 2002, 2003; 2009, 2010, 2011), as well as once in 1-Flag (2011, 2012, 2013). Channel Islands did not compete at USA Nationals in 1997. They have also earned the championship titles at Miss Dance/Drill Team International in 1985, 1987, 2001, and 2003, as well as most decorated pep flags team in the history of Miss Dance Drill Team USA. The team has also implemented changing their flags in a "flag-change", much like what is seen in a colorguard or winterguard routines.
- Chaparral High School
- Compton High School
- Crenshaw High School
- Crescenta Valley High School
- Glendora High School
- Herbert Hoover High School
- Hueneme High School
- International Polytechnic High School
- John Burroughs High School
- Kyoei Gakuen High School (Japan) is the 2006 and 2008 Miss Dance Drill Team International Championship team. Their 2008 performance has been considered as one of the all-time memorable performances in the pageant's history.
- La Cañada High School
- Leuzinger High School
- Long Beach Poly High School earned their first USA Nationals Championship in both the 1-Flag and 2-Flag divisions in 2008. They are also the first school to have a male on their squad to win a USA Nationals Championship that same year.
- Mary Immaculate School
- Mira Costa High School
- Monte Vista High School
- Morse High School earned their first USA National Championship in the 1-Flag division in 2010. Morse was the second school to have a male win a USA National Championship. Morse won both 1-Flag and 2-Flag divisions for their first time in 2014, along with their first 2-Flag title and first undefeated season. They are also the National Champions for 1-Flag and 2-Flag divisions in 2015, making this the first time to hold both titles back to back from 2014 to 2015.
- Mount Diablo High School
- Narbonne High School has won the Miss Dance/Drill Team USA championships from 1991–1998, and 2008. They also earned the championship title at Miss Dance/Drill Team International in 1989 and 1995. Narbonne did not compete in the 2005 and 2006 seasons. They have also won the USA National Champion titles in 1990, 1992, 1993, 1995, 1996, and 1999.
- Norwalk High School
- Novato High School
- Oxnard High School was one of the first schools to have a male that competed at USA Nationals in 2006 (placing fourth) and the first school to have two males to compete on a team at USA Nationals 2007 competition (placing sixth).
- Palos Verdes Peninsula High School
- Pittsburg High School
- Redondo Union High School
- San Gabriel High School
- San Pedro High School
- San Ramon Valley High School
- Santa Ana High School
- Santee High School
- South Gate High School
- South Pasadena High School
- South High School
- St. Patrick-St. Vincent High School is one of the few pep flagging schools in Northern California. Also one of the few schools to place in the 2-Flag division (2011) in its first appearance at nationals.
- Temple City High School
- Torrance High School
- University of California, San Diego
- University of California Davis
- Upland High School
- Washington Preparatory High School
- West Covina High School
- Westchester High School
- Whittier High School
- Whittier Christian High School

== Pep Flags in media ==
Pep flags, or the use of pep flags, is featured in various media. Such depictions include:

Musicals

- Legally Blonde - "What You Want" (2007)

Music videos

- Tonic - "You Wanted More" American Pie Soundtrack (1999)
- Gwen Stefani - "Hollaback Girl" (2005)
- Panic! at the Disco - "I Write Sins Not Tragedies" (2006)

Television

- Ninja Warrior
- Legally Blonde: The Musical – The Search for Elle Woods
- Hollywood Christmas Parade
- Macy's Thanksgiving Day Parade
- McDonald's Thanksgiving Parade
- Rose Parade

Movies

- Bring It On: All or Nothing

== Competition history ==
United Spirit Association (USA) National Champions
Year	Two-Flag Division	One-Flag Division	Two-Flag - Novice Division
1986	Channel Islands High School		
1987	Channel Islands High School	Channel Islands High School	
1988	Channel Islands High School	Carson High School	
1989	Carson High School		
1990	Narbonne High School		
1991	Channel Islands High School		
1992	Narbonne High School		
1993	Narbonne High School		
1994	Arapahoe High School		
1995	Narbonne High School		
1996	Narbonne High School		
1997	Bishop Montgomery High School		
1998	Channel Islands High School		
1999	Narbonne High School		
2000	Carson High School		
2001	Channel Islands High School		
2002	Channel Islands High School		
2003	Channel Islands High School		
2004	Carson High School		
2005	Carson High School	Carson High School (One-Flag Division was reinstated in 2005)	
2006	Carson High School	Carson High School	
2007	Channel Islands High School	Channel Islands High School	
2008	Long Beach Polytechnic High School	Long Beach Polytechnic High School	
2009	Channel Islands High School	Channel Islands High School	
2010	Channel Islands High School	Morse High School	
2011	Channel Islands High School	Channel Islands High School	
2012	Carson High School	Channel Islands High School	
2013	Channel Islands High School	Channel Islands High School	
2014	Morse High School	Morse High School	
2015	Morse High school	Morse High school	Glendora High School
2016	Channel Islands High School	Channel Islands High School	Glendora High School
2017	Channel Islands High School; Carson High School (co-champions)	Carson High School	Crescenta Valley High School
2018	Channel Islands High School	Channel Islands High School	Crescenta Valley High School
2019	Channel Islands High School	Channel Islands High School	Crescenta Valley High School

Miss Dance Drill Team USA (MDDTUSA) US and International Champions
Year	US National Champion — Two-Flag Division (See Kay Teer Crawford)	US National Champion — One-Flag Division	World Champion
1983	Pioneer High School		
1984			
1985	Westchester High School	Channel Islands High School	Channel Islands High School
1986	Bishop Montgomery High School	Channel Islands High School	Bishop Montgomery High School
1987	Channel Islands High School	Channel Islands High School	Channel Islands High School
1988	Channel Islands High School	Channel Islands High School	
1989	Channel Islands High School	Channel Islands High School	Narbonne High School
1990	Channel Islands High School (One- and Two-Flag divisions were combined 1990-2006)		Bishop Montgomery High School
1991	Narbonne High School		
1992	Narbonne High School		Kyoei Gakuen High School (Japan)
1993	Narbonne High School		
1994	Narbonne High School		
1995	Narbonne High School		Narbonne High School
1996	Narbonne High School		
1997	Narbonne High School		
1998	Narbonne High School		
1999	Channel Islands High School		
2000	Channel Islands High School		
2001	Channel Islands High School		Channel Islands High School
2002	Channel Islands High School		
2003	Channel Islands High School		Channel Islands High School
2004	Channel Islands High School		Kyoei Gakuen High School (Japan)
2005	Channel Islands High School		
2006	Channel Islands High School	Channel Islands High School	Kyoei Gakuen High School (Japan)
2007	Channel Islands High School	Channel Islands High School	
2008	Narbonne High School	Channel Islands High School	Kyoei Gakuen High School (Japan)
2009	Channel Islands High School	Channel Islands High School	
2010	Channel Islands High School	Channel Islands High School	Channel Islands High School
2011	Channel Islands High School	Channel Islands High School	Kyoei Gakuen High School (Japan)
2012	Channel Islands High School	Channel Islands High School	Channel Islands High School
2013	Channel Islands High School	Channel Islands High School	Channel Islands High School
2014	Bishop Montgomery High School	Bishop Montgomery High School	
2015	Kyoei Gakuen High School (Japan)	Channel Islands High School	
2016	Channel Islands High School	Channel Islands High School	Kyoei Gakuen High School (Japan)
2017		Bishop Montgomery High School	Kyoei Gakuen High School (Japan)
2018	Carson High School	Channel Islands High School	
2019	Carson High School	Carson High School	

== See also ==
- Cheerleading
- Ōendan
- Pep squad
