= Air Force Day =

Military holiday focusing on air force

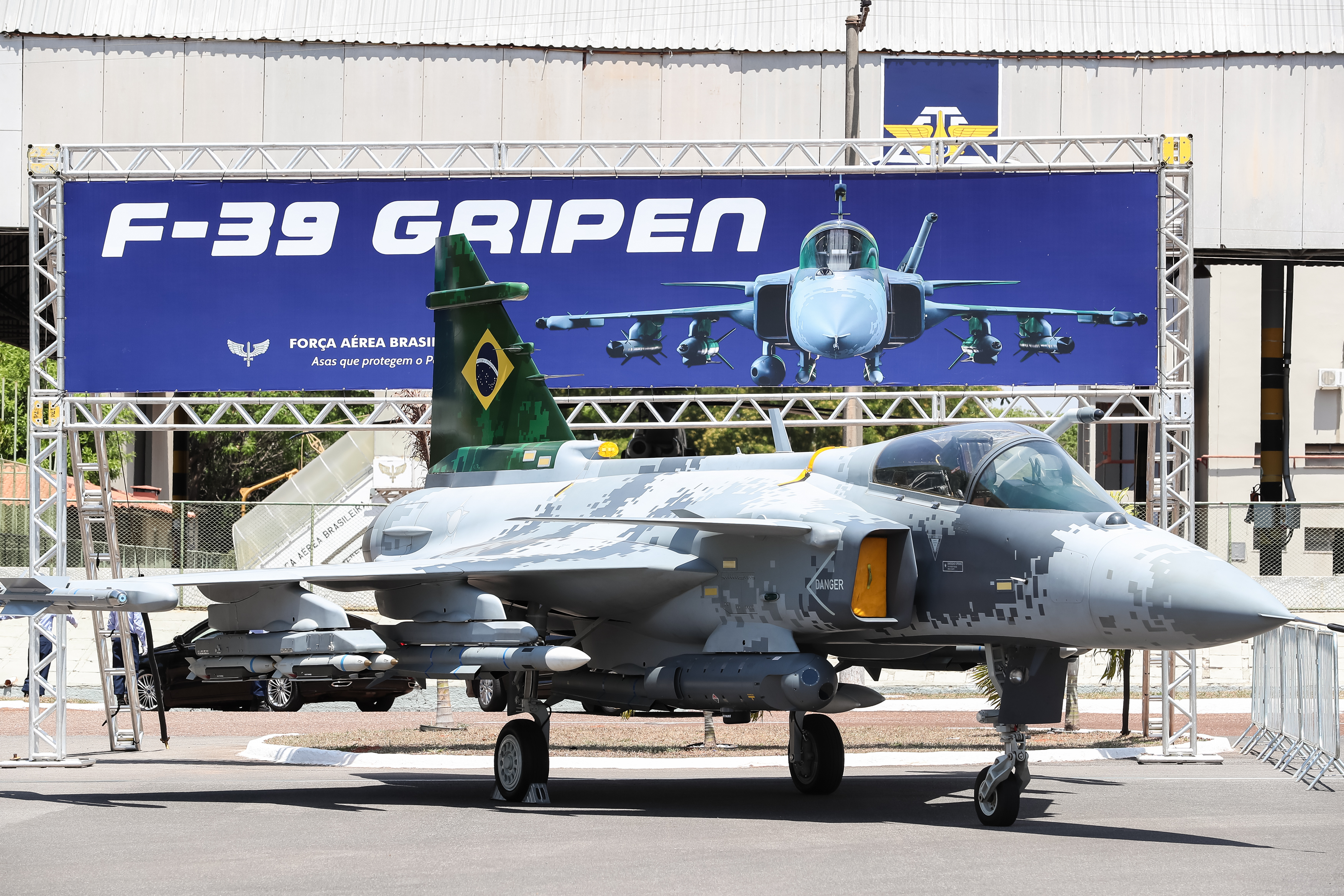
A plane during a ceremony in commemoration of the Day of the Aviator and the Day of the Air Force in Brazil.

Air Force Day or Day of the Air Force is observed by several nations with an armed forces as a military holiday to recognize their country's air force. These holidays often hold the same status as any military's Armed Forces Day.

== By country ==
=== Armenia ===
The Armenian Air Force celebrates its professional holiday on 26 June.

=== Azerbaijan ===
The Azerbaijani Air Forces celebrates Air Force Day on 14 February.

=== Bangladesh ===
The Bangladesh Air Force celebrates Air Force Day annually on September 28th. This date marks the founding of the BAF in 1971 during the Bangladesh Liberation War, when the unit known as "Kilo Flight" was established with 57 members and three aircraft, playing a pivotal role in the nation's fight for independence.

=== Belarus ===
The Air Force and Air Defence Forces of the Republic of Belarus celebrates Air Force Day every third Sunday in August, following the Soviet Air Force precedent to honor the branch's 2001 unification.

=== Bulgaria ===
Aviation and Air Force Day is celebrated by the Bulgarian Air Force on 16 October. It was chosen as a holiday as it honors the first combat flight in Bulgaria. Wreaths and flowers are laid in front of the Monument of the Bulgarian pilot at the building of the National Assembly. The President of Bulgaria attends the national ceremony in Sofia, where he/she receives an honor guard. The Aviation Museum in Krumovo also celebrates the holiday with an open day.

=== Canada ===
Since 2006, the Royal Canadian Air Force has celebrated Air Force Day on 4 June. It has been hosted by the Royal Canadian Air Force Association of Canada (RCAFA) on Ottawa's Parliament Hill.

=== Finland ===
The Finnish Air Force celebrates its Nationality Day on 6 March. This date marks the establishment of the Finnish Air Force in 1918. The celebrations include various ceremonies and events hosted by the Finnish Air Force across the country, honoring the service and dedication of its members past and present.

=== Germany ===
The German Air Force celebrates its founding on 9 January.

=== India ===
The Indian Air Force celebrates its holiday on 8 October. Air force bases in India hold parades and air shows to mark the holiday. The Air Warrior Drill Team often performs on this day.

Although 8 October is now officially observed as Air Force Day to mark the IAF’s establishment in 1932, this was not always the case. For the first few decades after independence, the IAF primarily celebrated 1 April, commemorating the date when its first flight operations began in 1933. The transition to 8 October as the formal anniversary occurred later, as institutional efforts to standardise military commemorations gained traction. A detailed history of the evolving significance of these dates has been documented.

=== Indonesia ===
The Indonesian Air Force celebrates its founding on 9 April. The Air Force also celebrated "Air Force Service Day" (Indonesian: Hari Bakti TNI AU) on 29 July to commemorate the Dakota VT-CLA's incident.

=== Kyrgyzstan ===
The Kyrgyz Air Force celebrates Aviation Day on 18 August. It marks the directive of the General Staff of the Soviet Armed Forces, that established an air unit at the Tokmak Aviation Training Regiment. On Aviation Day in 2019, the 60th anniversary of military aviation in the nation was celebrated, with the air force holding an air parade in the Chüy Region.

The anniversary of the founding of the Kyrgyz Air Force is also observed on 27 July.

=== Nicaragua ===
The Nicaraguan Air Force celebrates Air Force Day on 1 February.

=== Pakistan ===
Air Force Day (Urdu: یوم فضائیه, or Youm-e-Fizaya) in Pakistan is a national day celebrated on 7 September, a day after Defence Day. Airshows and other programs are held by the Pakistan Air Force to honour its role in defending the nation during the Bajaur Campaign, Indo-Pakistani War of 1971 and specifically in the Indo-Pakistani War of 1965.

=== Philippines ===
Air Force Day is marked on 1 July by the Philippine Air Force, marking the formal anniversary of its creation in 1947.

=== Russia ===
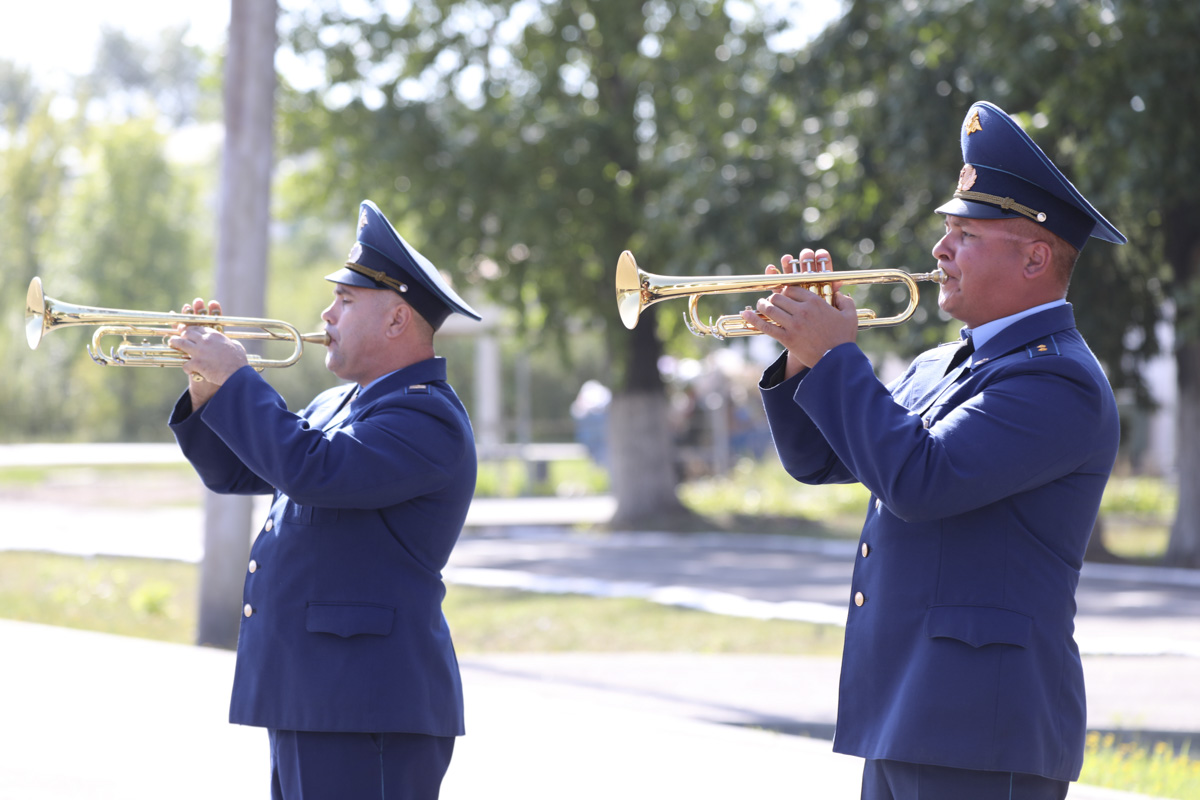
Members of Russian military bands on Air Force Day in 2020.

Russia's Air Force Day is celebrated on 12 August and honors personnel, and veterans of the Russian Aerospace Forces. It was originally known as Air Fleet Day (Russian: День Воздушного Флота) when it was established in 1933 and was celebrated on the third Sunday of August. The modern date for the holiday was introduced by President Vladimir Putin on 31 May 2006. The date marks the anniversary of the establishment of the Imperial Russian Air Service, which was formerly part of the Engineer Corps of the Imperial Russian Army prior to that day. 12 August is still widely regarded as birthday of Russian military aviation. Air shows are commonly held at Zhukovsky Airport while more ceremonial events are held at the House of War and Armed Forces Veterans in Moscow.

=== Taiwan ===
The Republic of China Air Force celebrates Chinese Air Force Day on 14 August. It commemorates the acts and sacrifices of the pilots of the Republic of China in the 1930s. Also known as the "814 Day", it marks the anniversary of the first air-to-air victory ever made by the Republic of China Armed Forces against the Imperial Japanese Army Air Service.

=== Turkey ===
The Turkish Air Force Foundation Day is the anniversary holiday for Turkey's military aviation force. The foundation of the Turkish Air Force was laid by the Minister of War Mahmud Shevket Pasha in Yeşilköy on 1 June 1911, when the first Ottoman Aviation Squadrons were created. This date has since been accepted as the birthday of the Turkish Air Force.

=== Ukraine ===
Ukrainian Air Force Day is celebrated on the first Sunday of August. The celebration date is set by the presidential decree of Viktor Yushchenko signed on 27 June 2007.

=== United States ===
The Air Force Day of the United States was introduced on 1 August 1947 by order of President Harry Truman. It was created "in recognition of the personnel of the victorious Army Air Forces and all those who have developed and maintained our nation's air strength". 1 August was specifically chosen as the date for this holiday for historical reasons, being that at the time of its introduction, it celebrated the ruby jubilee of the 1907 establishment of the Aeronautical Division, U.S. Signal Corps. It officially came into being after the signing of the National Security Act of 1947, with its first celebration being staged while still under the control of the United States Army. Air Force Day was last observed in 1949.

=== Uzbekistan ===
The Uzbekistan Air and Air Defence Forces celebrates its professional holiday on the third Sunday of August. It was introduced by decree of President Islam Karimov on 21 July 1995. On this holiday, the Ministry of Defense organizes a number of events, including a wreath laying ceremony to honor pilots who died in the line of duty. A ceremonial flypast is also organized by the Tashkent Military District over the city of Chirchiq.

27 August is the Aviation Day for the Abkhazian Air Force of Abkhazia

== See also ==
- Navy Day
- Army Day
