= Precision Drill Squad (Singapore) =

Exhibition drill in Singapore

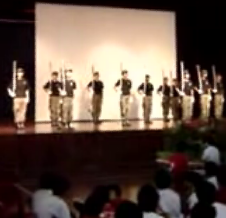
An NCC PDS Performance

Precision Drill Squad (PDS) is a form of exhibition drill practised in Singapore which involves the execution of rifle drills in complex series of movements with great co-ordination and precision. The natures of these drills exhibit a plethora of diversity; they may be sharp and quick, graceful and flowing, or include a wide variety of tossing and spinning techniques. During performances, performers move in unison through choreographed patterns with the rifles moving under their control, always synchronised with the rhythm of the music. Drills are executed without command and the only sound that is heard is the snap and pop of the rifles on every step, in perfect synchronisation and with precision.

PDS is mainly performed and executed by the Singapore Armed Forces Military Police Command and a few privileged National Cadet Corps units, National Police Cadet Corps units and National Civil Defence Cadet Corps units in Singapore, usually at school events, inter-unit competitions or open houses.

== Origin ==
PDS is derived from rifle exhibition drill, which originated from United States' various drill teams such as the Marine Corps Silent Drill Platoon and have since spread to many other countries such as Norway, Australia, Slovenia and Taiwan. PDS is identical to the Silent Precision Drill Squad (SPDS) of the SAFMPC.

Introduced in 1984, SPDS is performed in the Changing of Guard Ceremony at the gates of the Istana on the first Sunday of every month and in major events like Singapore National Day Parades and Chingay Processions, and was adopted in its present form by the National Cadet Corps, where it is performed by NCC school units which have adopted PDS in their training syllabus by 1999, with an initial participation of only about 20 school units. Due to its rarity and difficulty, the element of PDS in NCC units and NPCC units is considered a great privilege. The first time the PDS appeared in public was in the 1994 National Day Parade.

== Equipment ==
=== Rifles ===
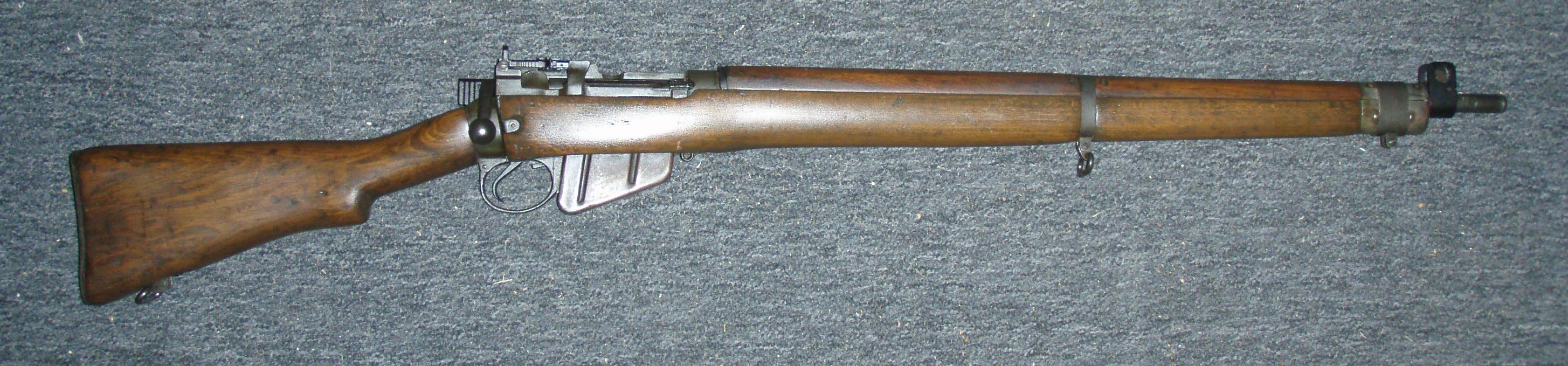
The Lee–Enfield Mk IV

PDS is most commonly executed with either the 4 kg (8.8 lbs) Lee–Enfield Mk IV rifle, or the many variations of the Mk IV fiberglass or wooden replica rifles, which are 105.5 cm long, 3.2 cm thick at the muzzle, and weigh from 1.6 kg to 5.0 kg. Variations include the Performance rifle or the heavier Competition rifle. The dummy rifles are black by default, but come in various colours and designs to match the nature of the performance. Some versions include metal bases, tips or other additions to enhance the 'feel' of the performance. M-16 rifles are also sometimes used, and on occasion, with bayonets fixed.

=== Attire ===
The official attire for PDS stipulated by HQ NCC is the Smart No. 4 or Half No. 4 uniform for all cadets, although air or sea units are permitted to wear their respective No. 3 uniforms without badges. Since male cadets in Land units only receive their No.3 uniform upon graduation from the Cadet Officer Course, No. 3 uniforms are sometimes borrowed for the sake of performances. In this case, the No. 3 uniform is worn with white stable belts, white polyester laces and combat boots with trousers tucked into garters, in imitation of the Military Police No. 3 Uniform. Modified versions of the attire can be worn to increase the aesthetic appeal of the performance, notable examples being Half No. 4 with Jockey Cap, Half No. 3, No. 3 with Brassards labelled "PDS", "Precision Drill" or with ranks embroidered, also in imitation of the SAF Military Police No. 3 Uniform. White gloves can also be worn for performances.

== Participating schools ==
These are the NCC units that are known to practise Precision Drill:

School	District	Achievement
Admiralty Secondary School	Central	
Ahmad Ibrahim Secondary School	Central	
Anglican High School	East	National 4th (2010), National 3rd (2013), National 11th (2012, 2014), National 13th (2016), National 2nd (2024)
Anglo-Chinese School (Barker Road)	Sea	
Anglo-Chinese School (Independent)	West	
Anglo-Chinese School (Independent)	Sea	National 13th (2011), National 5th (2012), National 8th (2013), National 14th (2014), National Last (2015)
Ang Mo Kio Secondary School	Air	National 6th (2010), National 3rd (2011), National 17th (2012), National 9th (2013), National 6th (2010, 2014)
Anderson Secondary School	Central	
Bartley Secondary School	Air	
Bartley Secondary School	East	
Beatty Secondary School	Central	National 12th (2013), National 13th (2012, 2014), National Champions (2019)
Bedok Green Secondary School	East	National 5th (2014)
Bedok South Secondary School	East	
Bedok View Secondary School	East	National 8th (2012), National 10th (2023), National 2nd (2025)
Bendemeer Secondary School	East	
Bukit Merah Secondary School	West	
Bukit Panjang Government High School	West	National 10th (2012), National 4th (2013), National 3rd (2014), National 5th (2015, 2016)
Catholic High School	Air	National 16th (2014), National 12th (2015), National 2nd (2013, 2016, 2018, 2019, 2023)
Compassvale Secondary School	Air	
Chong Boon Secondary School	Central	
Chung Cheng High School (Main)	East	
Chung Cheng High School (Yishun)	Air	
Christ Church Secondary School	Central	National 17th (2014)
Christ Church Secondary School	Girls	Girls 4th (2019)
Clementi Town Secondary School	West	National Last (2013)
Crescent Girls' School	West	Girls 3rd (2015, 2016, 2017), Girls 2nd (2014, 2018, 2019), Girls Champions (2022, 2023)
Deyi Secondary School	Central	National 12th (2011), National 9th (2012), National Champions (2017), National 3rd (2018)
Dunman Secondary School	Air	
East Spring Secondary School	East	
Fairfield Methodist School (Secondary)	West	National 14th (2011), National 4th (2012), National 10th (2013), National 7th (2015), National 9th (2016), National 2nd (2014, 2022), National Champions (2026)
Fajar Secondary School	West	
Fuhua Secondary School	West	National 7th (2023), National Champions (2024, 2025), National 2nd (2026)
Gan Eng Seng School	West	
Guangyang Secondary School	Central	
Hillgrove Secondary School	Air	National 3rd (2024)
Holy Innocents High School	Central	
Hougang Secondary School	Central	
Hwa Chong Institution	West	National Champions (2010, 2013, 2014, 2015), National 6th (2016), National 2nd (2011, 2012, 2017)
Junyuan Secondary School	East	National 6th (2013)
Jurong Secondary School	West	
Jurong West Secondary School	West	
Kranji Secondary School	West	National 3rd (2025), National 4th (2026)
Manjusri Secondary School	East	
Mayflower Secondary School	Central	National 21st (2012)
Montfort Secondary School	Central	National 13th (2015)
Nan Hua High School	West	National 7th (2012), National 8th (2014, 2015, 2016)
Naval Base Secondary School	Central	
Nan Chiau High School	Central	National 3rd (2022, 2026), National Champions (2023), National 4th (2025)
New Town Secondary School	West	National 19th (2012)
Ngee Ann Secondary School	East	National 18th (2023)
Northbrooks Secondary School	Central	National 18th (2012)
North Vista Secondary School	Central	
Pasir Ris Crest Secondary School	East	National 5th (2010, 2013), National 6th (2015), National 7th (2016)
Pasir Ris Crest Secondary School (Girls)	East	National 12th (2012), Girls Champions (2014, 2015, 2016, 2019), Girls 3rd (2018, 2022), Girls 2nd (2017, 2023)
Pei Hwa Secondary School	Central	National 9th (2023)
Peirce Secondary School	Central	National 20th (2012), National 7th (2014), National 8th (2016)
Punggol Secondary School	Central	
Queenstown Secondary School	West	
Raffles Girls' School	Central	Girls Champions (2017, 2018), Girls 3rd (2014, 2019), Girls 2nd (2015, 2016, 2022)
Regent Secondary School (defunct)	West	National 19th (2014)
River Valley High School	West	National 3rd (2023)
Sembawang Secondary School	Sea	
Sengkang Secondary School	Central	National 4th (2019)
Serangoon Garden Secondary School	Central	
Springfield Secondary School	East	National 14th (2012), National 3rd (2015), National 12th (2014, 2016)
St. Joseph's Institution	Air	
St. Joseph's Institution	Central	National 2nd (2010), National 4th (2011), National 15th (2012)
Tanjong Katong Secondary School	East	National 5th (2011), National 3rd (2012), National 12th (2014), National 10th (2015), National 11th (2023)
Tanjong Katong Secondary School	Sea	National Last (2012), National 15th (2014), National 2nd (2015), National 10th (2016)
Temasek Secondary School	East	National 6th (2012)
Unity Secondary School	Air	National 11th (2015)
Victoria School	East	National 16th (2012)
West Spring Secondary School	West	
Woodgrove Secondary School	Central	National 15th (2011)
Woodlands Secondary School	Central	
Woodlands Ring Secondary School	Central	National 3rd (2017, 2019), National Champions (2016, 2018, 2022)
Xinmin Secondary School	Central	
Yishun Secondary School	Central	National 4th (2014, 2015), National 3rd (2016)
Yishun Town Secondary School (defunct)	Central	National Champions (2011, 2012), National 9th (2014, 2015), National 4th (2016)
Yuying Secondary School	Central	

=== Centre of Excellence ===
The NCC PDS Centre of Excellence was set up to allow NCC units that wish to introduce Precision Drill as part of their training curriculum but do not have the necessary expertise may send their specialists and cadet officers for training at the centre. As a Centre of Excellence, the unit's Centre of Excellence Council is given the autonomous right to train key stakeholders of NCC units of other schools and issue them Basic PDS badges and patches on their course completion, the first unit awarded the title being Hwa Chong Institution in 2007.

=== List of Training Centers ===
To qualify as PDS training centre, the NCC school unit must, on a regular and yearly basis, conduct PDS training for different NCC units in their respective District.

Catholic High School

Hwa Chong Institution

Fairfield Methodist School (Secondary)

Anglican High School

Deyi Secondary School

=== NCC PDS Committee ===
The NCC PDS Committee was formed on 25 May 2012 by a group of PDS Auxiliary Instructors, intended to improve and maintain the standard and prestige of PDS in the National Cadet Corps. The PDS Committee assists HQ NCC in running the Basic PDS Certification and any other PDS-related HQ Courses.

== Training courses ==
=== Basic Course and Certification ===
Cadets from NCC PDS units have the opportunity to attend the Basic PDS course, held at the NCC campus at Amoy Quee Camp or the five NCC PDS Training Centres quad-annually. During the 3-day course cadets are instructed in the execution of basic PDS drills, more commonly referred to as the basic 21 and the conduct of PDS Rifle Physical Training (PT). Cadets are tested based on two categories, Drill Execution and Presentation. Upon passing of the test, cadets will attain the Basic PDS badge, Basic PDS patch and a certificate. Units that include Basic PDS in their training syllabus may skip the course entirely and send their cadets for Basic PDS certification directly.

=== Auxiliary Instructor Course ===
Upon passing of a stringent selection test, outstanding cadets will have the privilege of attending the PDS Auxiliary Instructor Course. Cadets may enroll in the Enhanced PDS Auxiliary Instructor Course, held in HQ NCC (Amoy Quee Camp) and conducted by SPDS instructors from the SAF Military Police Command SPDS unit. The 5-day course will cover 7 advanced arm drills and train participants on the conduct of PDS as an instructor and cadets will be tested based on MOI (Method-of-Instruction), which is how the cadets teach the drills, and execution of the 7 Drills. Upon graduation from the course, these cadets are qualified to conduct PDS trainings in their respective school units, as well as attaining the PDS AI badge, the PDS AI patch and a certificate.

== Inter-unit competition ==
The inaugural 1st NCC Silent Precision Drill Squad Competition was held on 12 June 2010, and has since been held annually at HQ NCC in Amoy Quee Camp, although it was held at SCAPE at Orchard in 2023. The Competition gives the various school units the opportunity to present their choreographing skill and drill standard, giving recognition to the best drill squads. Every year, the Challenge Trophy, the Golden Rifle, is entrusted to the winning team for a year. Should any team emerge as champions for three consecutive years, the Golden Rifle is theirs to keep. Hwa Chong Institution and Pasir Ris Crest Secondary School (Girls) remain as the only units to have achieved this.

The Competition includes an inspection of appearance and bearing and an evaluation of the squad's performance.

The following is the scoring criteria for the PDS competition:

Evaluation criteria	Total points
Appearance and bearing	20
Six basic drills	40
Performance	40
Total	100

=== Penalties ===
A deduction of 5 points will be made for every cadet under the minimum squad size of 9, 2 points for boundary violations during the performance, 2 and 3 points respectively for slipping or dropping of rifles, and 1 point for every second the performance fails to meet the criteria of being restricted within 4 to 6 minutes in length.

=== List of champions ===
Boys' Category
Year of Competition	Unit
2010	Hwa Chong Institution
2011	Yishun Town Secondary School
2012	Yishun Town Secondary School
2013	Hwa Chong Institution
2014	Hwa Chong Institution
2015	Hwa Chong Institution
2016	Woodlands Ring Secondary School
2017	Deyi Secondary School
2018	Woodlands Ring Secondary School
2019	Beatty Secondary School
2020	Competition cancelled due to COVID-19
2021	Competition cancelled due to COVID-19
2022	Woodlands Ring Secondary School
2023	Nan Chiau High School
2024	Fuhua Secondary School
2025	Fuhua Secondary School
2026	Fairfield Methodist Secondary School

Girls' Category
Year of Competition	Unit
2014	Pasir Ris Crest Secondary School
2015	Pasir Ris Crest Secondary School
2016	Pasir Ris Crest Secondary School
2017	Raffles Girls' School
2018	Raffles Girls' School
2019	Pasir Ris Crest Secondary School
2020	Competition cancelled due to COVID-19
2021	Competition cancelled due to COVID-19
2022	Crescent Girls' School
2023	Crescent Girls' School

== Types of performance ==
PDS performances can be generally classified under two major types, Stage Performances and Field Performances.

=== Stage performances ===
PDS Stage performances are smaller-scaled performances, generally with 10–20 performers on stage. Unlike the larger-scaled Field Performances, stage performances usually include more spectacular, advanced PDS drills. Stage performances have also been known to include special lighting effects into its performances.

=== Field performances ===
PDS Field performances are the largest-scaled performances, generally with 28–40 performers on a grass field or courtyard. Unlike the smaller-scaled Stage Performances, Field Performances can be displayed to a significantly much larger crowd of spectators. Pyrotechnic devices such as sparks or fireworks could be included in its performances.

== Drill syllabus ==
PDS drills can be classified into the Basic 21 (Marching Arm Drills, Salute Arm Drills, Dressing Arm Drills, Performance Arm Drills) and the Advanced 7. The Advanced 7 are taught during the PDS Auxiliary Instructor course. All drills are done in counts of 8 as a way to help choreographers synchronize with accompanying music.

The list of advanced drills is non-exhaustive, given the infinite possibility of drills that can be invented or modified for the purpose of performances, and many reflect increasing influence from the Rifle Exhibition Drill in the United States.

=== Basic 21 Drills ===
==== Slope and Order Drills ====
- Vertical Slope Arm (4+1)
- Vertical Order Arm (4+1)
- Diagonal Slope Arm (6+1)
- Diagonal Order Arm (4+1)

==== Marching Arm Drills ====
- Slapping Arm (12+1)
- Sungfoo Arm (14+1)
- Double Right Turning Arm (18+1)
- Slow Markal Arm (16+1)

==== Salute Arm Drills ====
- 11-Step Salute (10+1)
- Butt Salute (8+1)
- Marine Salute (6+1)

==== Dressing Arm Drills ====
- Popeye Arm (12+1)
- Balancing Arm (16+1)
- Pungfoo Arm (10+1)
- Modified Seagull Arm (Chingay Seagull Arm) (14+1)
- Momo Arm (10+1)

==== Performance Arm Drills ====
- Modified Dragon Toss Arm (26+1)
- Mortar Arm (18+1)
- Pipa Arm (16+1)
- Sea Games Arm (14+1)
- Tamil Arm (12+1)

Outside of the Basic 21, there are some drills which have been removed from the syllabus but continue to be used in performances, both in their original as well as modified forms. Some examples include:

- Original Momo Arm
- Original Double Right Turning Arm
- Original Dragon Toss Arm
- Volvo Order Arm
- Volvo Slope Arm
- Right Turning Arm

=== Advanced Drills ===
==== AI 7 Drills ====
- Impact Arm (12+1)
- Ramesh Arm (18+1)
- Tapping Arm (18+1)
- Flipper Arm (22+1)
- Dolphin Arm (18+1)
- Champagne Arm (24+1)
- Original Seagull Arm (30+1)

==== Created Drills ====
- Flying Fish Arm
- T3H
- Tick Tocks

==== Fundamental Advanced Techniques ====
- Rotation/One hand spin(Right/Left/Double Handed)
- Tornado Toss
- Vincent
- Foot stop
- AXP
- Centino
- Hawaiian
- Jumbo

==== Tosses ====
- Jumbo (Double/Triple/Quad/Quint)
- AXP (Double/Triple/Quad/Quint) aka Lucifer
- Saturn Exchange (Front/Back)
- Jesus Toss
- Taiwanese Toss
- Continuum Toss

=== Flow Components ===
- Rising Sun (Variant 1/2/3)
- Exit (Single/Double/Triple)
- Fireknife (Single/Double)
- Crossplane
- Continuum
- Eclipse
- Power Stop/Downtown
- Hawaiian Punch
- Neck Wrap

==== Hooks ====
- J-Hook (Single/Double/Triple)
- OTH J-Hook
- M-Hook
- AR Hook
- Jeup Hook

==== Over The Head (OTH) Techniques ====
- Helicopter
- Heli Toss
- Palm Spin

==== Ninjas ====
- Front Ninja
- Side Ninja
- Back Ninja

==== Wrist Techniques ====
- Flailing Rifle
- Hell's Whip
- Lightsaber
- Jerk Spin Off
- Wristbreaker

==== Crossplanes ====
- Centino Crossplane
- Tomahawk Crossplane
- The Illinois Crew (TIC) Crossplane

==== Rolls ====
- Side Palm Roll
- Around The Neck Roll

==== Death (360° Turn) Techniques ====
- Flying Floridian
- Flying Hawaiian
- Half Moon
- Death Triple/Quad Jumbo
- Death Continuum
- Cointoss
- 180° Continuum Cointoss
- J-Hook Death
- Palm Toss Death
- Death Ground Knock

== Performance videos ==
Many of the NCC units have filmed their exhilarating performances and are available for free viewing on YouTube under the channels 'National Cadet Corps', 'SgPDS(NCC)', 'HQ National Cadet Corps' and "NCC PDS". Within these channels viewers can learn the basic 21 PDS drills used by these school teams.

== See also ==
- Exhibition drill
