= Broom brigade =

Military team

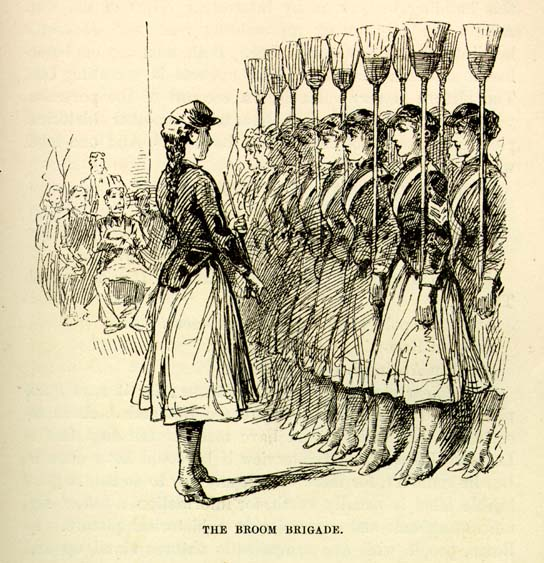
A broom brigade (1883)

A broom brigade was a type of military-style women's drill team that marched with brooms instead of rifles. Drilling was a popular form of exercise at the time, when participation in sports was largely restricted to men. They were popular in America during the late 19th century. They were mentioned in Mark Twain's book "Life on the Mississippi".

== Brigades ==
- St. Louis Ladies Broom Brigade Michigan (1870s)
- Ladies of the Russian Broom Brigade of St. Louis, MO (1882)
- The Woman's Relief Corps (1883) women's auxiliary to the Grand Army of the Republic.
  - Hamilton Broom Brigade (1884)
- Company Q, (1888) University of Minnesota.
- Broom Brigade, Union (1889)
- Kilbourn Broom Brigade, Wisconsin Dells, Wisconsin (1888)
- Breckenridge Broom Brigade, Caldwell Co., Missouri, (c. 1890)

== Current usage ==
Currently the term refers to citizens who volunteer to clean up their neighborhoods.

== See also ==
- Marching girls
