= Youm-e-Marka-e-Haq =

Pakistani memorial day

- Also called: Marka-e-Haq Day
- Observed by: Pakistan
- Significance: Celebrates the military successes of the 2025 India-Pakistan conflict
- Observances: Wreath laying ceremonies, concerts, parades
- Date: 10 May
- Next time: 10 May 2027
- Frequency: Annual

Youm-e-Marka-e-Haq (Urdu: یومِ معرکہ حق, lit. 'Day of the Battle of Truth'), is Pakistan's official day of remembrance for the 2025 India-Pakistan conflict (locally known as Marka-e-Haq). Observed on 10 May each year, the national day commemorates the successful completion of a combined military operation codenamed Operation Bunyan-un-Marsoos against India amidst the 2025 India-Pakistan crisis.

== Background ==
A brief armed conflict between India and Pakistan began on 7 May 2025, after India launched missile strikes on Pakistan. While India stated it had targeted alleged terrorist camps, the strikes killed 31 people and injured 57 including women and children. In retaliation, the Pakistan Armed Forces launched a combined military operation codenamed Operation Bunyan ul Marsoos targeting numerous Indian military facilities and related infrastructure. The operation concluded after a US brokered ceasefire came into effect.

== History ==
The public holiday was announced on 12 May 2025 by Prime Minister Shahbaz Sharif after the US-brokered ceasefire had come into effect.

In May 2026, to mark the one year anniversary of Marka-e-Haq, Field Marshal Asim Munir made certain remarks at the General Headquarters (GHQ) Rawalpindi. He warned India of future "misadventure" against Pakistan which will result in "extremely far reaching and painful" consequences. He claimed that Pakistan's strategy during the conflict was "superior" than India.

== See also ==
- Defence Day
- Air Force Day (Pakistan)
