= Air Force Day (Pakistan) =

National day on 7 September,

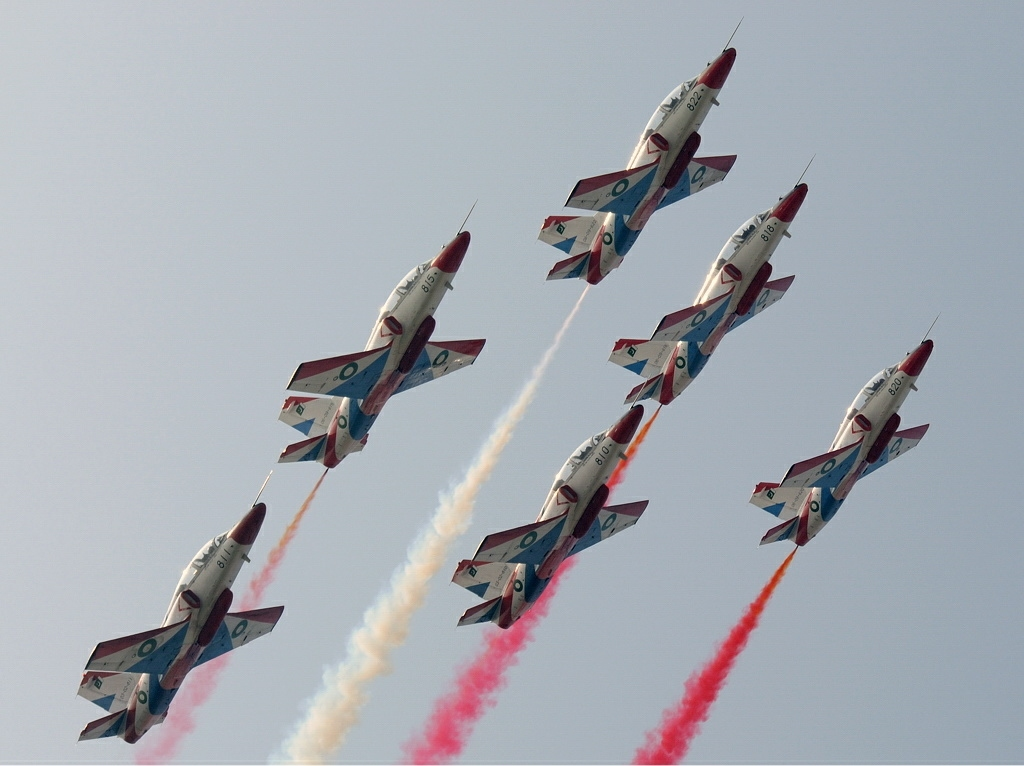
- PAF Sherdils aerobatics team
- Official name: یوم فضائیه
- Also called: Pakistan Air Force Day
- Observed by: Pakistan
- Significance: History of the Pakistan Air Force; 1965 Aerial War
- Celebrations: Airshows, Exhibitions, Flag hoisting, Speeches etc.
- Date: 7 September
- Next time: 7 September 2027
- Frequency: Annual
- Related to: Air Force Day

Air Force Day (Urdu: یوم فضائیه or Youm-e-Fizaya) is celebrated in Pakistan as a national day on 7 September, after the annual celebration of the Defence Day. Airshows and other programs mark the Pakistan Air Force's (PAF) role in defending the nation in the Indo-Pakistani War of 1965.

== Indo-Pakistani war of 1965 ==
On 6 September, both countries openly went to war following a series of minor skirmishes that preceded the 6th, when Pakistan was attacked by India from the Lahore-Burki sector during the dead of night (at 5 am). The war began following Pakistan's Operation Gibraltar, which was designed to infiltrate forces into Jammu and Kashmir to precipitate an insurgency against rule by India. The five-week war caused thousands of casualties on both sides. It ended in a United Nations (UN) mandated ceasefire and the subsequent issuance of the Tashkent Declaration.

=== Notable decorations ===
A notable event of the war was that Pakistan Air Force flying ace Muhammad Mahmood Alam shot down five Indian Air Force Hawker Hunter Mk.56 fighters in less than a minute, four being in first 30 seconds and became one of the few aviators who became ace in a day and the only jet age ace-in-a-day. He was awarded the Sitara-e-Jurat ("The star of courage") and bar for his actions.

=== Outcome of war for PAF ===
Pakistan Air Force gained a lot of credibility and reliability among Pakistan military and international war writers for successful defence of Lahore and other important areas of Pakistan and heavy retaliation to India on the next day. The alertness of the air force was also related to the fact that some pilots were scrambled six times in less than an hour on indication of Indian air raids.

== Airshows and celebrations ==
- Flag hoisting
- Parade
- Military exhibitions
- Award ceremonies
- Singing patriotic songs
- Entertainment and military programmes
- Speeches.
- Prayers for national unity
- Airshows featuring PAF aircraft

== See also ==
- Youm-e-Marka-e-Haq
