= Miss Dance Drill Team USA =

Also known as U.S. Nationals & Pageant, this national dance competition for precision dance teams, dance-drill teams, and dance studios is recognized as the origin of the competitive dance industry. The event was trademarked under the name Miss Drill Team U.S.A. and registered as a non-profit organization in 1973 by Dr. Kay Teer Crawford (creator of drill team, dance squad, and precision dance-sport teams). In 1989, the competition re-branded itself as Miss Dance Drill Team USA in an effort to recognize the varying performing arts interests of the many out-of-state teams that regularly traveled to Southern California to attend the annual event, which over the years has been held in the cities of Santa Monica, Los Angeles, Long Beach, and Irvine.

== U.S. Dance Nationals & Pageant ==
The idea for a national drill team (dance team) competition was Dr. Kay Teer Crawford’s thesis project while studying at the University of Southern California for her master's degree in physical education. The first “Miss Drill Team U.S.A.” national dance competition was held in 1968 at the Santa Monica Civic Auditorium in Santa Monica, California. Teams from 56 high schools and colleges from across the United States participated in the inaugural event. At that time, there were only 3 team performance categories that were adjudicated at the national competition: Songleading (Pom), Baton Twirling (Majorette), and Flag Twirling. Team group performances were adjudicated in the areas of routine choreography, technical execution, and showmanship.

The highlight of the event was the national soloist dance category. Solo title contestants were adjudicated in the same areas for their dance routine (with the first 10 seconds of the solo routine required to demonstrate military dance-drill stylized choreography). The soloist competition was structured much like a beauty pageant, and contestants were additionally required to perform a modeling presentation and deliver a speech on the subject of drill team.

The inaugural U.S. national dance solo title winner to be crowned “Miss Drill Team U.S.A.” at the 1968 competition was Carolyn Buford from John F. Kennedy High School in Cyprus, California. Awards for runner-up winners were presented as follows:

- Miss Drill Team USA: Carolyn Buford (John F. Kennedy High School)
- 1st Runner-Up: Wendy Beesley (Mira Costa High School)
- 2nd Runner-Up: Vicki Jessop (Glendora High School)
- 3rd Runner-Up: Barbara Lopes (St. Joseph High School)
- 4th Runner-Up: Sue Wells (Cerritos College)

Over 30 U.S. States have sent delegations of teams and soloists to the national dance competition since its inception.

== Regional Competitions ==
Solo title dance nationals contestants must place in the Top 10 at an affiliated regional state dance competition (or qualify via video submission) in order to compete in the solo title pageant division at U.S. Nationals. Independently organized MDDTUSA regional charter organizations have operated region-specific events in numerous U.S. states and foreign countries, such as: Alaska, Arizona, California, Colorado, Florida, Hawaii, Idaho, Illinois, Indiana, Iowa, Kansas, Minnesota, Montana, Nebraska, Nevada, New Mexico, Ohio, Texas, Utah, Washington, Japan, Australia, South Africa, and Brazil.

Single performers not competing for the solo title and team group routines do not need to pre-qualify at a regional event; they can participate in the national competition at-will without any pre-qualification requirements.

== Celebrities ==
The original 1968 national dance-drill team competition was hosted by Jim Lange (The Dating Game) and Terry Becker (Voyage to the Bottom of the Sea). The following celebrities have made public appearances during the competition to participate as a judge and/or crown the national solo title winner during the awards show:

- 1968: Terry Becker
- 1969: Kent McCord
- 1970: Chad Everett
- 1972: Peter Brown
- 1973: Anson Williams
- 1974: Reid Smith
- 1975: Bruce Fairbairn and Tim Donnelly
- 1975: Pat Haden
- 1976: Jan-Michael Vincent
- 1977: Shaun Cassidy
- 1978: Grant Goodeve
- 1979: Stephen Shortridge
- 1980: Michael Young (actor)
- 1981: Ted McGinley
- 1982: John James (actor)
- 1983: John Stamos
- 1984: Sam Behrens
- 1985: Rex Smith
- 1986: George Clooney
- 1988: Matthew Perry
- 1989: Weird Al Yankovic
- 1995: Teri Hatcher

== Scholarships ==
The MDDTUSA competition exists to support the Dr. Kay Teer Crawford Scholarship Foundation, with various annual college scholarship awards presented in a variety of categories, such as:

- Kay Teer Crawford Scholarship Award
- Solo Title Pageant Scholarship Award
- Brenda Caspary-Crawford Scholarship Award
