= Kay Teer Crawford =

American choreographer

Kay T. Crawford
- Born: Kay Waweehie Teer; August 16, 1914; Granger, TX
- Died: August 29, 2001 (aged 87); Redondo Beach, CA
- Other name: Kay Teer Crawford
- Occupations: Founder/Executive Producer, Miss Dance Drill Team USA (U.S. Nationals & International World Championships)
- Style: Dance-Sport
- Website: www.MDDTUSA.com

Kay Teer Crawford (1914-2001) was an American choreographer known as the "mother of drill team".

She was born Kay Waweehie Teer on August 16, 1914. She had Native American Cherokee and Comanche in her family lineage. She was raised in Grainger, Texas and lived in extreme poverty during her childhood. Crawford attended Edinburg High School (Edinburg, Texas), where she started the first "modern dance drill team" in 1929 after she had earned a spot on the school's cheerleading squad but 90 of her schoolmates did not. Her drill team idea was inspired by the marching styles of Reserve Officer Training Corps cadets at a local community college. The following year, her idea came to fruition when the Edinburg High School "Seargenettes" took the field in the fall of 1930.

Crawford earned degrees from Edinburg Junior College, the University of Mary Hardin-Baylor, the University of Texas, and University of Southern California (where she wrote her master's thesis on the subject of drill team). She earned her doctorate degree from Baylor University. Kay Crawford was a professor at Santa Monica College, UCLA, and USC.

Regarded as the "mother of drill team", Crawford died of cancer in her home in Redondo Beach, CA on August 29, 2001. She was 88 years old.

== U.S. Nationals & Pageant ==
In 1967, Crawford came up with the idea to produce Miss Dance Drill Team USA (MDDTUSA Nationals & Pageant) for her master's degree thesis project. To support this endeavor, she also opened an annual summer camp called "Drill Team World". Noted as the original and first national precision dance-sport competition for dance soloists, dance-drill teams, and dance studios, the inaugural US national dance competition was held in 1968 at the Santa Monica Civic Auditorium (Santa Monica, CA). It featured 268 dancers from 56 high schools and colleges across the United States. This contest is recognized as having started the precision dance competition industry. Soloist performer Carolyn Burford from John F. Kennedy High School (Cyprus, California) was crowned "Miss Drill Team USA". Mark Keppel High School (Alhambra, California) won the song-pom category and Temple City High School (Temple City, California) placed first in both the flag and baton twirling categories. The event was hosted by Hollywood actors Jim Lange, host of The Dating Game and Terry Becker, from NBC's television show Voyage to the Bottom of the Sea. Academic scholarships were also awarded. In 1970, Crawford's own daughter, Jan Crawford, was crowned the "Miss Drill Team USA" national solo title winner by television actor Chad Everett. The event and pageant format were registered by the United States Patent and Trademark Office in 1973.

The event later moved preliminary competition to Santa Monica College, with the final round being held at the Los Angeles Memorial Sports Arena when the event blossomed to include over 6000 participants. In 1978, contestants and teams from 25 U.S. states participated in the national competition. At the 1980 national competition, California Governor Jerry Brown declared a "Drill Team Day" and City of Los Angeles Mayor Tom Bradley declared it "Drill Team Week". Crawford's "Miss Dance Drill Team USA" is registered as a 501(c)(3) non-profit organization.

== World Championships & International Pageant ==
In 1981, Crawford started Miss Dance Drill Team International (World Championships) with the first event being held in California in 1982. The first international dance competition hosted more than 2000 high school-aged participants from 9 countries including the United States. Since then the event has hosted drill teams and dance teams from Australia, Bulgaria, Canada, England, Germany, Japan, Korea, Lithuania, Mexico, New Zealand, Poland, Singapore, and South Africa.

The international event moved to Japan in 1985, when Crawford's international coordinator Jack C. Kogoma received support from the International Cultural Association of Japan (Ministry of Foreign Affairs). The event was held at Kokugikan, a prominent sumo-wrestling arena in Tokyo, Japan. It later moved to Yoyogi National Gymnasium, one of the venues built for the 1964 Olympic Games. It later moved to Rainbow Hall in Nagoya, Japan. Miss Dance Drill Team International was later held in Australia and South Africa before returning to Southern California where it continues to be held today (concurrently with U.S. Nationals).

== Books ==
Crawford wrote the first and definitive textbook on the subject of precision dance-drill teams, entitled "The World of Drill Team" (first published in 1976). She also founded and edited a magazine on the subject of drill teams called "Let's Cheer".

== Olympic Games ==
Producer David L. Wolper worked with Kay Crawford, who recruited and directed 1,268 performers from the national MDDTUSA competition to perform during the opening and closing ceremonies of the 1984 Los Angeles Summer Olympic Games. She was also recruited for the same effort during the opening and closing ceremonies of the 1996 Atlanta Summer Olympic Games

Up until her death, Crawford had campaigned to make dance-sport precision teams and dance/drill team competitions an officially recognized athletic event in the Olympics.

== Notable performances ==
In 1986, Crawford choreographed a dance/drill performance for the rededication of The Statue of Liberty in New York City. The performance consisted of approximately 1000 all-star participants from each of the 50 U.S. states.

In 1987, she recruited and choreographed 287 girls to perform in angel costumes for Pope John Paul II during the mass he gave at Dodger Stadium in Los Angeles, California.

Crawford directed and choreographed halftime shows for seven NFL Pro Bowls, ten NFL Super Bowls, and four NCAA Rose Bowl games.
