= Equestrian drill team =

Horse teams riding choreographed patterns

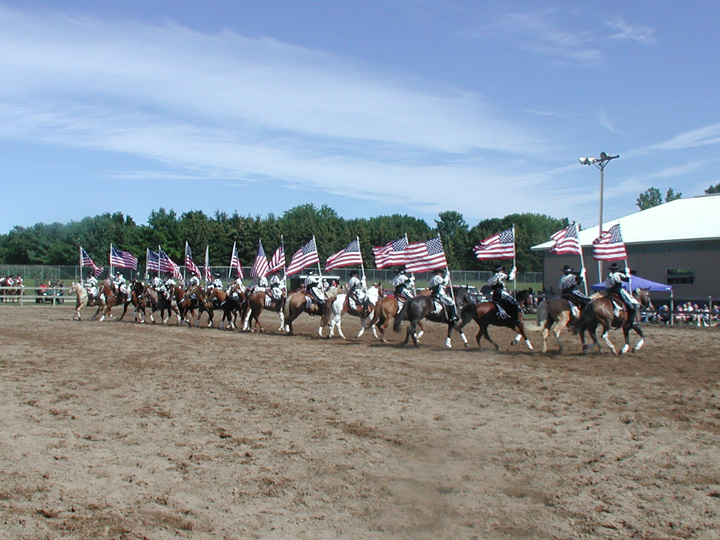
Equestrian drill team

Equestrian drill team

An equestrian drill team is a group of horses and riders performing choreographed maneuvers to music. Teams typically perform at rodeos, horse fairs, parades, benefits, and drill team competitions. Drill teams are intended to entertain, show sportsmanship, horsemanship, teamwork and dedication. Competition drill at the national level is a controlled ride and has continuous forward motion. Some competition venues have set up special divisions of competition to provide for novice, rodeo, youth, gaited and special effects (as allowed at the venue) such as theme and drama. Theme drill provides a division that allows teams to showcase their uniforms, horse ability, music, and inclusions of trick riding or other variations.

Members must have a uniform appearance, including outfits, hats, tack, and flags (if used). Horses should be of the same type, e.g. stock type, gaited, or miniature, however matching horse colors or breeds are at the team's discretion. Teams can range in size from four horses (Quad team) to 20 plus horses.

At competitions, a drill team is judged on ability, including spacing and alignment, timing and coordination, originality, difficulty, and attractiveness of patterns, speed, horsemanship, uniformity, manners of the animals, music, and crowd appeal. Categories can include Novice, Youth, 4-H, Gaited, Theme, Rodeo, Quad, or Open.

The United States Equestrian Drill Association (USEDA) is the governing body for mounted drill and color guard competitions in the United States. The USEDA sanctions competitions throughout the United States. The United States Equestrian Drill Championship (USEDC) is held each June at the Texas Rose Horse Park near Lindale, Texas as part of Super Ride - an International Festival of the Equestrian Arts.

The USEDA was developed after the Washington Ladies Riding Club Association was officially established in 1980. Currently the WLRCA hosts yearly competitions, leads clinics and helps establishes rules and guidelines for other teams to learn by. Participants from WLRCA fly all over the United States, providing clinics, judging, or offering insight to this wonderous world of drill.
