= Samuel Washington Weis =

American painter

Samuel Washington Weis (1870–1956) was an American cotton broker, painter and sketch artist.

== Early life and education ==
Samuel Weis was born in Natchez, Mississippi to Caroline (née Mayer) (1841–1885) and Julius Weis (1826–1909). His father was a German Jewish immigrant who came to the United States in 1845. His parents married in 1864 and moved from Natchez, where his mother was raised, to New Orleans. There Julius Weis became a successful broker buying and selling cotton. Caroline Weis returned to her mother in Natchez for the births of four of her seven children, including Samuel, born August 8, 1870.

After schooling in New Orleans, his parents sent Samuel to Phillips Exeter Academy for preparatory school, graduating in 1888. He attended college at the Massachusetts Institute of Technology, where he was one of the first Jewish students, graduating in 1892. He played football there and was a member of the Alpha Theta Chapter of the Sigma Chi fraternity.

== Career ==
Samuel Weis joined his father in the cotton business and painted as a hobby, achieving something of a reputation in New Orleans as an artist. He moved to Chicago and became president of Ilg Electric Ventilating Company, founded in 1906. The company, operating out of a series of large factories in Chicago, produced industrial fans, among them fans for Navy ships in World War I.

== Marriage and family ==
Samuel Weis married Edith Frank (1882–1971), and the couple had one child, Frances Weis Pick (1905–1988), a painter of watercolors.

Samuel Washington Weis died April 6, 1956.
