= Air Warrior Drill Team =

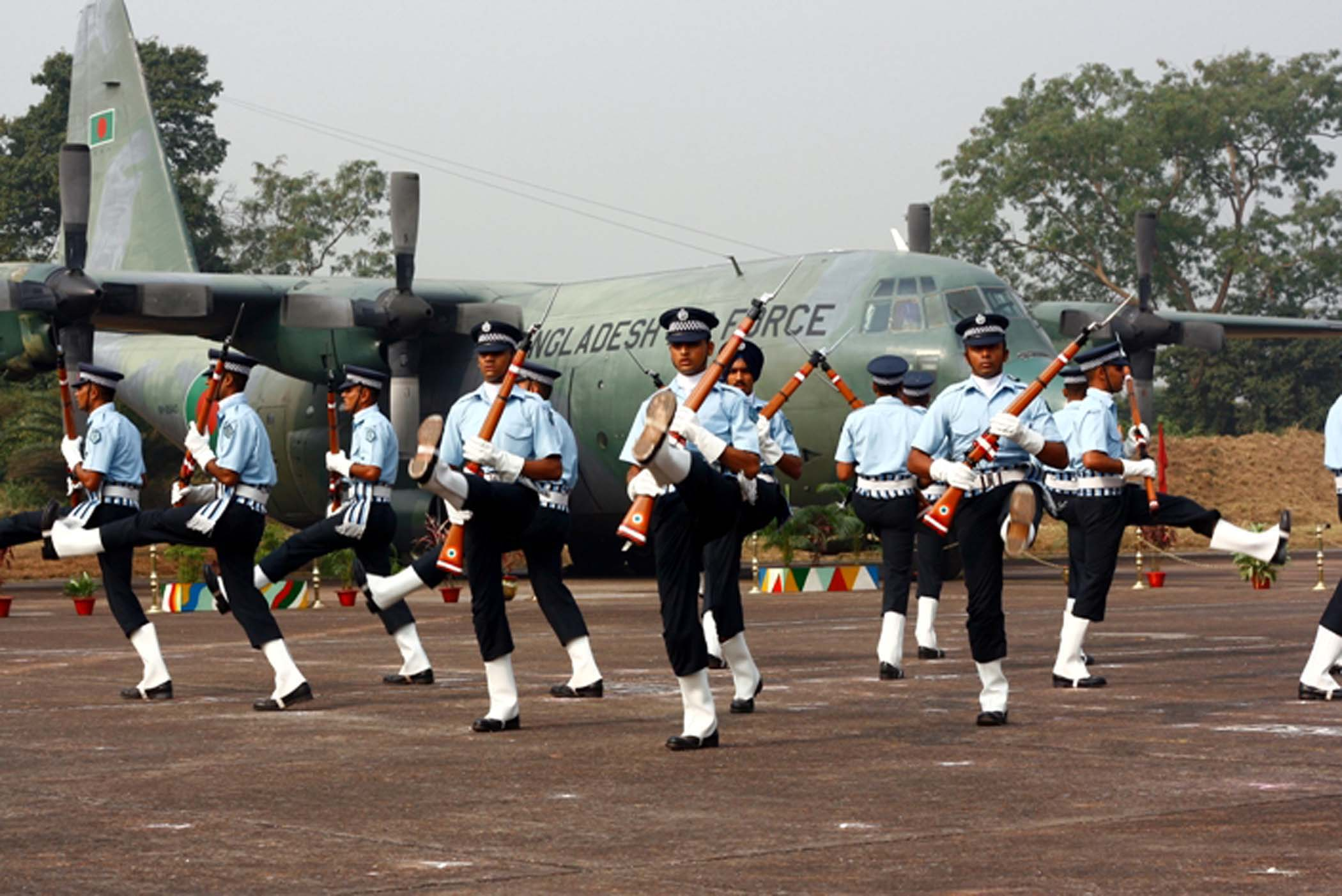
The AWDT performing at Bangladesh Air Force Base Dhaka, 7 December 2009.

The Air Warrior Drill Team (AWDT) is the ceremonial drill team of Indian Air Force, being a platoon-sized formation. It was founded in 2004 as the first of precision exhibition drill unit of its kind in the Indian Armed Forces. AWDT is divided into two teams: "Arjan" and "Subroto". The Arjan team has been created for international shows and performs extremely dangerous maneuvers. The other team is Subroto, which is the oldest team in AWDT. It falls under the command of the Directorate of Organisation of the IAF. This unit commonly performs during IAF events as well as national events such as Air Force Day Parade on 8 October as well as the Independence Day celebrations on 15 August. Their official motto is Drill to Thrill (Hindi: थ्रिल को ड्रिल करें). Its 28 members have also performed at venues such as Sher-i-Kashmir International Conference Centre and Tezpur Airport as well as performed during the IAF Presentation of Colours and the Subroto Cup. The unit uses Lee–Enfield rifles with fixed bayonets and performs routines that include complex spins and tosses.
