= Marching (sport) =

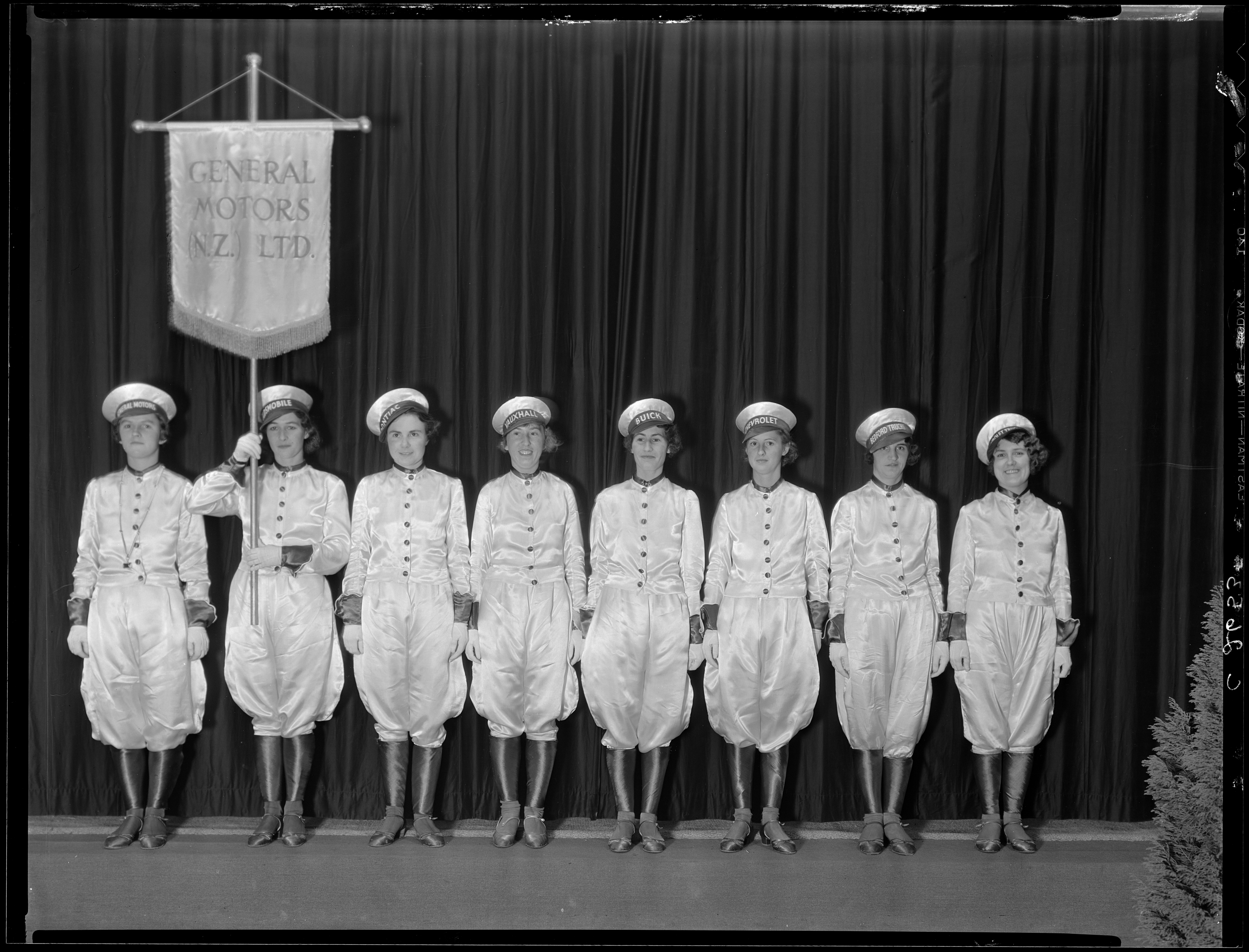
General Motors marching girls team - The Chauffeurs, 1935, Petone, by Gordon Burt, Gordon H. Burt Ltd. Te Papa (C.002653)

In New Zealand and Australia, a competitive sport involving marching teams of young women grew up and became established from the 1930s.

Marching combines military precision with formations and elaborate costumes.

The sport had its origins during the Great Depression when teams were formed to keep young women fit and healthy. The sport became more organised during the 1940s with a system of scoring developed to ensure teams could compete against one another. Points were deducted for lack of precision, dressing, movement and length of pace. At its peak, marching competitions drew large crowds of spectators.

Teams marched not only in competitions but also frequently appeared in parades and social occasions such as blossom festivals, A&P Shows and car race events.

Marching was the inspiration behind the television series Marching Girls which was developed for Television New Zealand and screened in New Zealand in 1987.

The Australian Marching Association (AMA) was the main officiating organisation for the sport in Australia up until 23 June 2012. On that date, at the organisation's Annual General Meeting, the sport unanimously approved the new name of DrillDance Australia to replace the name Australian Marching Association. DrillDance Australia is now the governing body. This rebranding marks a significant turning point in the sport in Australia as it takes steps to once again be a popular choice of activity for young people as well as those returning to the sport. Marching New Zealand (MNZ) is the main officiating organization for the sport in New Zealand.

In Australia, teams compete in the U/8, U/12, U/17, Senior and Masters sections. Routines, depending on the age group, consist of Basic Drill, Technical Drill, Exhibition Drill, Thematic Drill, Thematic Dance and Prop DrillDance. Costumes, movements and music enhance each type of routine according to the team's chosen theme.

In New Zealand, teams compete in the Kiwi, Fernz, U/12, U/16, Senior, Master and Leisure grades in the Review and Inspection, Technical and Display drills.
