= Exhibition drill =

Form of military marching

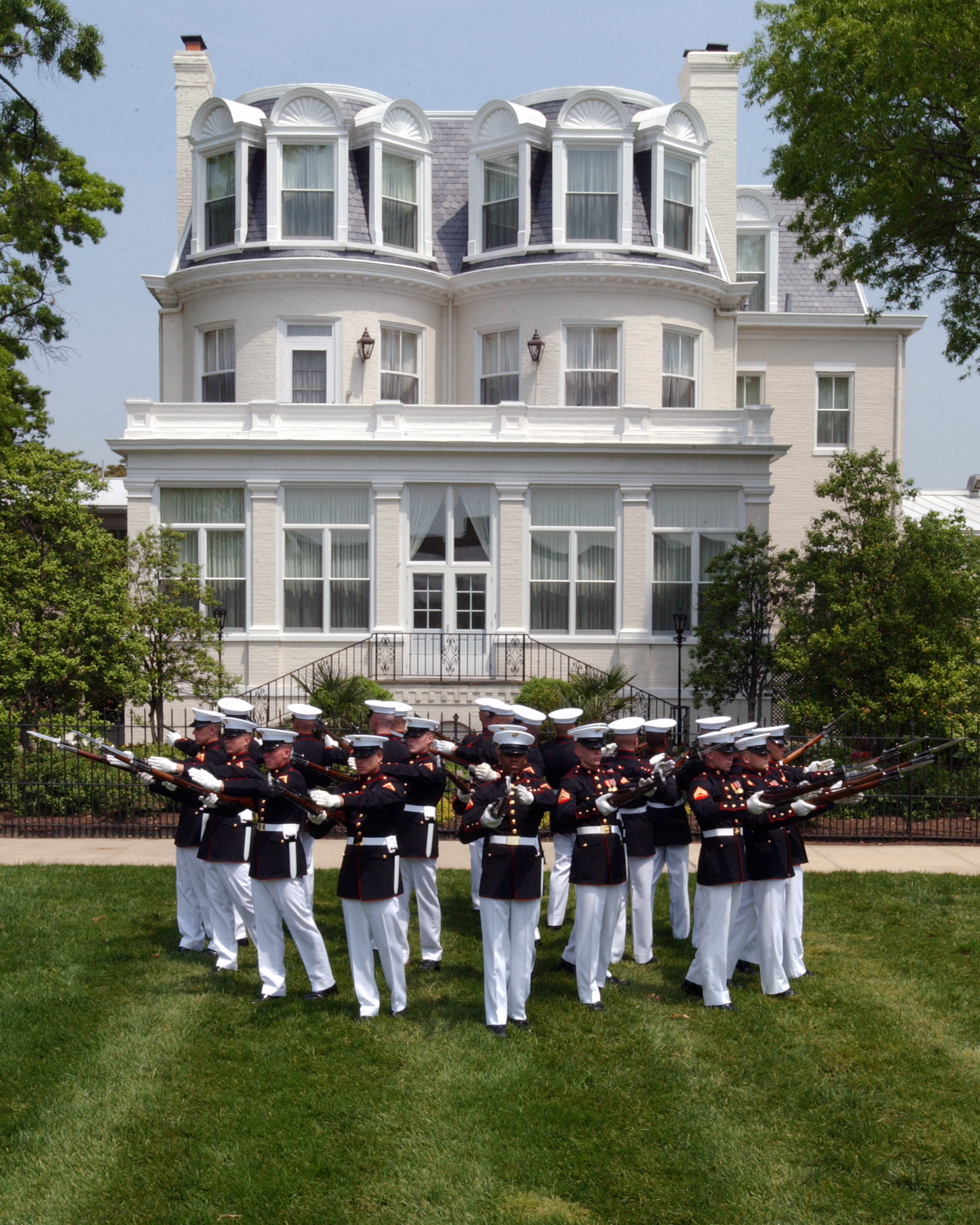
The United States Marine Corps Silent Drill Platoon performs in front of the home of the Commandant of the Marine Corps.

Exhibition drill is a variant of drill that involves complex marching sequences which usually deviate from drill used in the course of ordinary parades. Teams performing exhibition drill are often affiliated with military units, but the scope of exhibition drill is not limited to military drill teams. Exhibition drill is often performed by Armed Forces Precision Drill Teams, the drill teams at service academies and ROTC and JROTC units, and civilian drill teams that perform at parades, drill meets, and half-time shows and other public venues.

== History of rifle exhibition drill ==
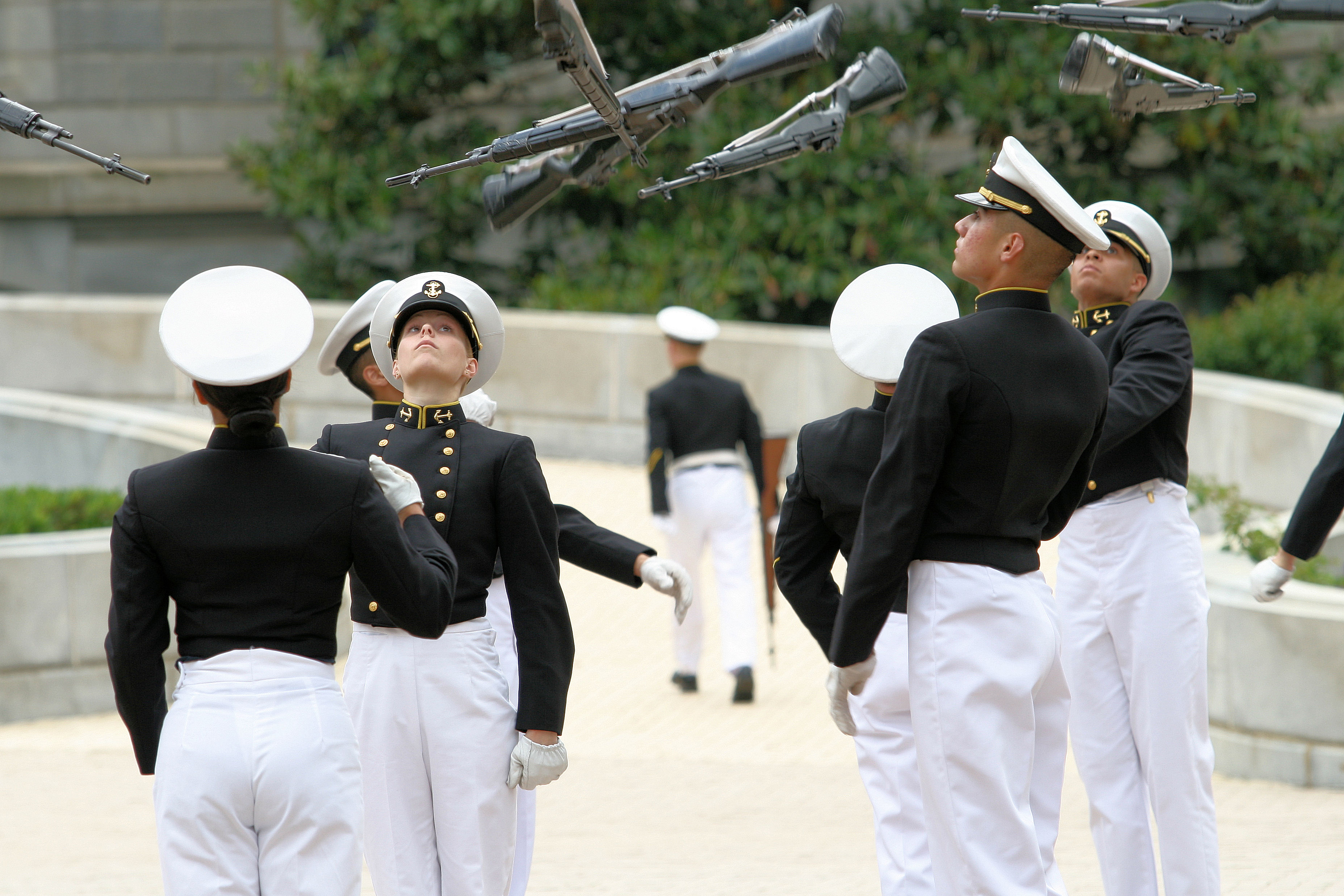
A rifle drill team performance at the United States Naval Academy

The first documented performance of exhibition drill was performed by Hadji Cheriff and filmed at what is believed to be the Midway Plaisance of the 1893 World's Columbian Exposition in Chicago, Illinois. The film was later copyrighted by Thomas Edison in 1899, entitled The Arabian Gun Twirler.

== Exhibition drill in competition ==
Exhibition drill is one of many different drill phases that are a part of a drill meet. Other phases include Inspection, Color Guard and Regulation Drill.

Exhibition military drill has grown drastically in popularity in recent decades. This growth can be attributed to several primary factors. These include:

- The expansion of Junior ROTC programs through the four primary service branches that occurred in the early and mid 1980s took the total number of units from roughly 1,600 to well over 2,500 in the U.S. This provided more cadets the opportunity to be a part of these exhibition drill teams.
- The work of Sports Network International (SNI) produced military drill and ceremony competitions on a scale that had never previously been seen.
- From these numerous competitions, SNI produced magazines and websites to feature this activity. SNI also produced training and entertainment videos devoted exclusively to featuring many of the military exhibition drill teams in the country. These videos allowed the talent and creativity involved in exhibition drill at the highest levels to travel and expand at a greater rate, helping to promote the sport.

General rules and guidelines

Rules of exhibition drill during competitions vary, but most of them apply the following guidelines:

Time – There is usually a minimum and maximum time a routine may take. Points are deducted if a team is under or over time.

Boundaries – Teams should be aware of their boundary lines, and if necessary, alter their routines as to not cross the boundary lines. Points are deducted if a person crosses a boundary line.

Some high-school level competitions prevent cadets who are participating in armed drill events from performing more dangerous 'over the head' spins, or raising cadets off the floor, in the interest of safety.

=== High school ===
Some high school drill teams compete at the National High School Drill Team Championships in Daytona Beach, Florida, and generally use demilitarized Springfield M1903s, M1 Garands, M-14 rifles and Daisy Drill Rifles. There are also national drill level competitions for JROTC divisions, including Navy JROTC, Army JROTC, Marine Corps JROTC, and Air Force JROTC. Other countries have their own drill team competitions for teenagers.

=== Unarmed ===
In an unarmed division, exhibition drill may consist of intricate precision marching, along with various hand movements. Modified step team routines are used in some competitions.

=== Post High School ===
In addition to the National High School Drill Team Championships, SNI also hosts the World Drill Championships in Daytona Beach, Florida. This event is for competitors who are 18 and have graduated from high school and open to competitors worldwide.

Past WDC Champions

Year	Category	Name	Category	Names		
2007	Solo	Filiki Tupuola Jr	Tandem	Chester Centino; Rene Balisco		
2008	Solo	Chester Centino	Tandem	IryAllan Bolo; McHuy McCoy		
2009	Solo	Matthew Wendling				
2010	Solo	Michael Renn	Tandem	Michael Renn; Adam Renn		
2011	Solo	Matthew Wendling	Tandem	Michael Renn; Adam Renn		
2012	Solo	Andres Ryan	Tandem	Michael Renn; Adam Renn		
2013	Solo	Justin Delaurier	Tandem	Michael Renn; Adam Renn		
2014	Solo	Samuel Gozo	Tandem	Barbosa; Barbosa		
2015	Solo	Andres Ryan	Tandem	Chris Haley; Tyler van Keuren		
2016	Solo	Michael Renn	Group	Dylan Baine; Michael Renn; Adam Renn		
2017	Solo	Robert Zyko				
2018	Solo	Andres Ryan	Tandem	Andres Ryan; Adam Jeup	Group	Drill-Team Dynamics
2019	Solo	Alejandro Paulino	Tandem	Andres Ryan; Neriah Guerin		
2020	Solo	Samuel Gozo	Tandem	Andres Ryan; Neriah Guerin		
2021	Solo	Trey Simmonds	Tandem	Neriah Guerin; Brando Fuentes		
2022	Solo	Neriah Guerin	Tandem	Cameron Arroyo; Trey Simmonds		
2023	Solo	Jackson Rainwater	Tandem	Trey Simmonds; Isaac Rodriguez		
2024	Solo	Jackson Rainwater	Tandem	Jonathan Ludwig; Jackson Rainwater		
2025	Solo	Trey Davidson	Tandem	Andrew Katz; Trey Davidson	Group	Norwich University Shock Platoon

== College ROTC drill teams ==
Colleges with Reserve Officers' Training Corps (ROTC) units, as well as military academies, have drill teams normally train and compete in two types of drill events: Regulation/Close Order and Exhibition (Trick or Fancy) Drill. Regulation Drill is conducted in accordance with Field Manual 22-5 (now FM 3-21.5) Drill and Ceremonies. Exhibition Drill is more free form and often more elaborate than Regulation Drill. Exhibition Drill teams are also more colorful in uniform and weaponry. In both types of event, participants are typically armed with weapons made safe or inert by removal of firing pins. Armament is totally devoid of all firing mechanisms for the safety of participants and audience alike.

- Pershing Rifles, founded in 1894, is the oldest continuously operating college organization dedicated to military drill. The original drill team created by John J. Pershing had a simple goal: to serve as an example for the cadets at the University of Nebraska, who were sorely lacking in esprit de corps, motivation, and basic military skills. A typical unit performs as a color guard, exhibition drill team, honor guard, funeral detail, or any other ceremonial unit requested; these services are usually at the request of the local ROTC detachment or school, but are sometimes requested by alumni, local governments, or active duty military units. Pershing Rifles hosts a National Drill Competition each spring which attracts some of the finest college level drill teams in the nation.
- The Blue Ridge Rifles, established in 1950, is the military precision drill team of the Corps of Cadets at the University of North Georgia (formerly North Georgia College and North Georgia College and State University), which is designated as the Military College of Georgia and one of six United States senior military colleges. Today, the Blue Ridge Rifles perform year-round for the University of North Georgia, high schools, parades, and sporting events. The also conduct 21 gun salutes and flag folding for military and police honors and funerals, and they compete in intercollegiate drill meets such as the Mardi Gras Invitational Drill Meet in New Orleans, Louisiana.
- Gator Guard Drill Team is a precision drill team and military fraternity based at the University of Florida. It is named after the Florida Gators, the mascot of the University of Florida. Founded in 1953, the Gator Guard absorbed and succeeded the University of Florida's Army ROTC chapter of the Pershing Rifles upon its inception. The Gator Guard performs annually at the university's Homecoming Parade, as well as the Krewe of Mid-City and King Rex parades at the New Orleans Mardi Gras. The team uses M1903 rifles with 8-inch bayonets for all performances. The Gator Guard also performs color guard ceremonies for the University of Florida, the SEC, and the MLB.

== Outside the United States ==
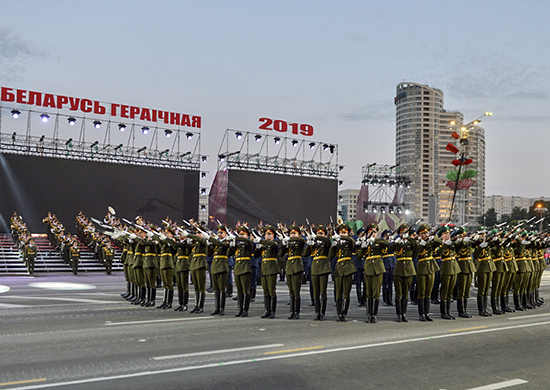
An exhibition drill routine performed by the Honor Guard of the Armed Forces of Belarus during a civil-military parade in honor of the 75th anniversary of the Minsk Offensive, 3 July 2019.

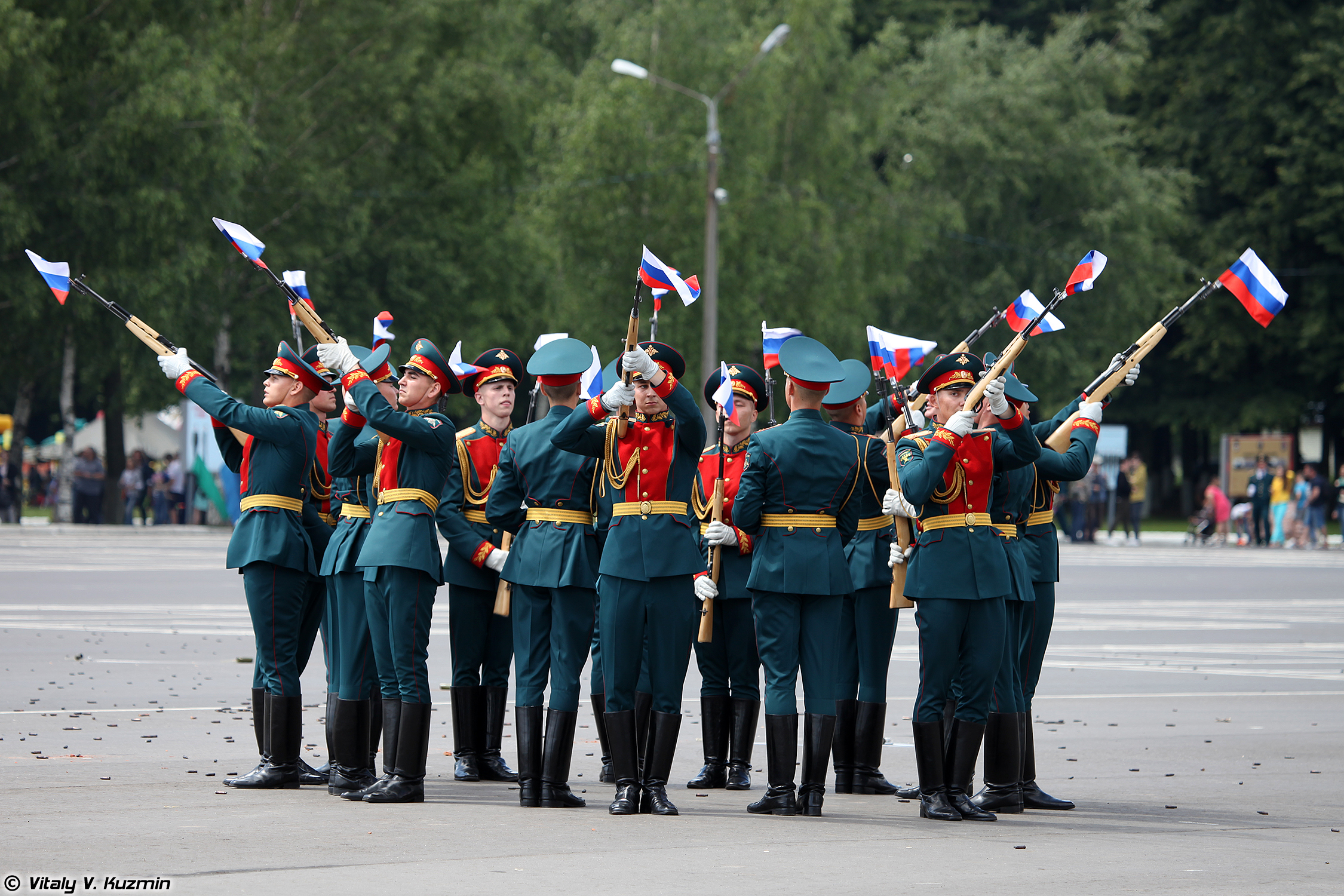
The drill team of 154th Preobrazhensky Independent Commandant's Regiment, Russian Federation.

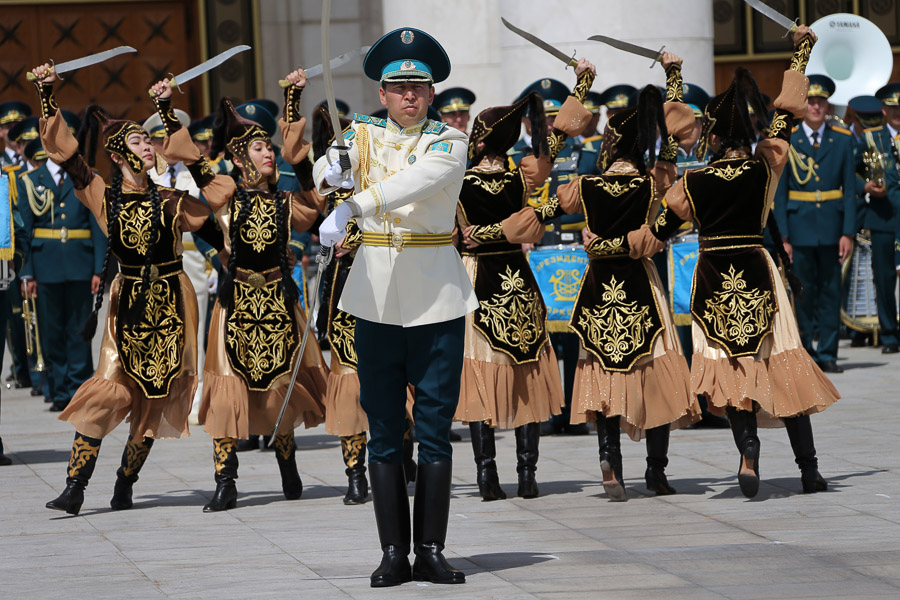
Captain Khasen Omarkhanov of the Aibyn Presidential Regiment performs a sabre exhibition drill during a military tattoo in Astana.

- The Norwegian Army has a silent drill platoon in the Kings Guard, performing in foreign tattoos like Edinburgh.
- The French Republican Guard also has a famous exhibition drill unit.
- Another example can be found in the Singapore Armed Forces Military Police Command's and the National Cadet Corps (Singapore) Silent Precision Drill Squad.
- The Malaysian counterpart for these teams is the Provost Drill Team of the Royal Malaysian Navy.
- The Italian Navy recently implemented a silent drill platoon (Plotone Alta Rappresentanza) as a part of the San Marco Marine Brigade.
- The Hellenic Navy has a precision movement unit called Άγημα Κινήσεων Ακριβείας (Agima Kiniseon Akriveias). It is made up of conscripts and also takes part in the "Μεικτός Λόχος Απόδοσης Τιμών" (Meiktos Lohos Apodosis Timon/Mixed Guard of Honour), a tri-service guard of honour composed of servicemen from the Hellenic Army, the Hellenic Navy, and the Hellenic Air Force is maintained as part of the Ministry of National Defence.
- The Russian 154th Preobrazhensky Independent Commandant's Regiment's honour guard battalion also serves as a drill unit. It performs exhibition drill or плац концерт (lit. 'parade ground concert'). Similar to their Russian counterparts, all personnel of the Honor Guard of the Armed Forces of Belarus are capable of performing exhibition drill routines in addition to their ceremonial role. This practice also applies to the post-Soviet states in Ukraine, Armenia and Kazakhstan.
- The Baltic republics of Estonia, Latvia and Lithuania has practiced many exhibition drills but they do not follow the Russian or Soviet drill procedures due to the Occupation of the Baltic states by the Soviet Union.
- The Canadian National Drill Team of the Ceremonial Guard and the 2nd Battalion, Royal 22nd Regiment serves as a drill unit for the Canadian Armed Forces (CAF). The Royal Military College of Canada also maintain a silent drill team which engages in rifles and sword drill. The branches of the Canadian Cadet Organizations, which include of the Royal Canadian Army Cadets, Royal Canadian Sea Cadets, and the Royal Canadian Air Cadets, have drill competitions throughout the year for their exhibition drill teams.
- The Armed Forces of Malta Drill Team and the Malta Police Precision Drill Team serve as drill units in the Republic of Malta.
- The Queen's Colour Squadron of the British Royal Air Force Regiment is the sole ceremonial unit in the Royal Air Force that has provided displays of exhibition drill which are performed without a single word of command.
- The Fort Henry Guard is an entirely civilian exhibition drill organization, consisting of Canadian high school and university students who are trained to perform at the Fort Henry National Historic Site.

== See also ==
- Drill team
- Foot drill
- War dance
- Weapon dance
- United States Marine Corps Silent Drill Platoon
- French Republican Guard
- Blue Ridge Rifles
- Friedrich Wilhelm von Steuben
