= Drill commands =

Marching group

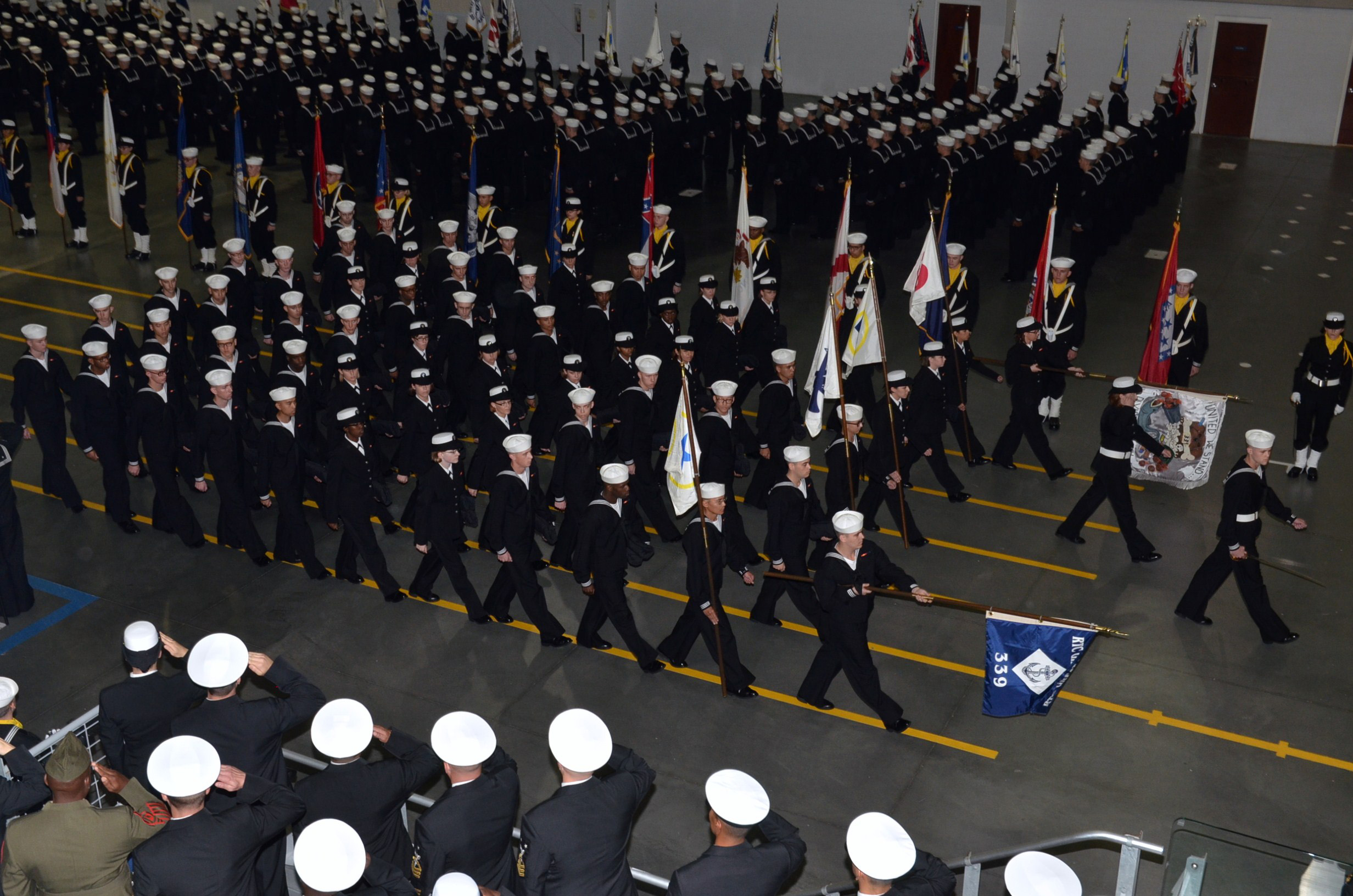
US Navy recruits marching in a drill hall

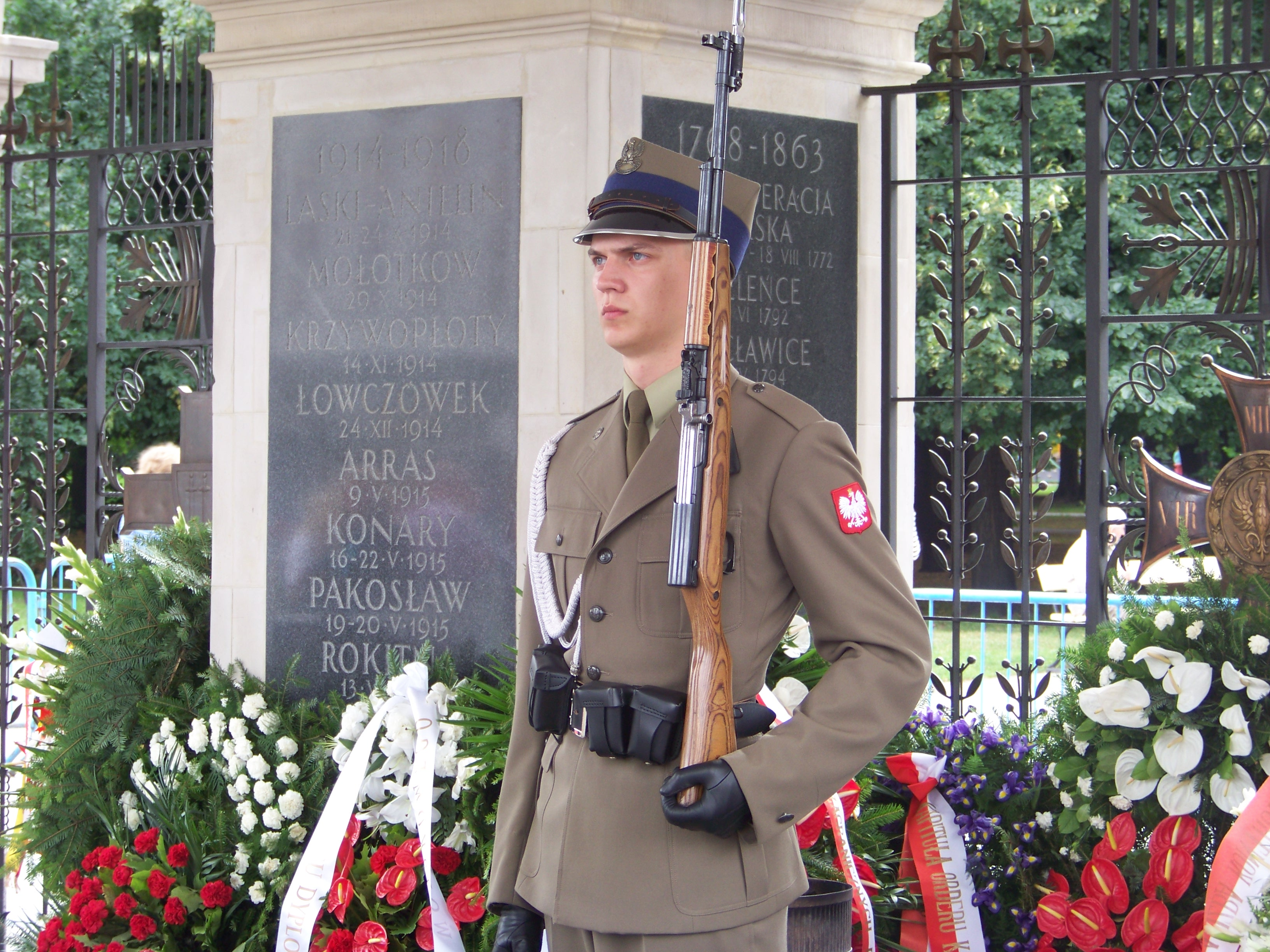
A Polish soldier in the slope arms position

Drill commands are generally used with a group that is marching, most often in military foot drills or in a marching band. Drill commands are usually heard in major events involving service personnel, reservists and veterans of a country's armed forces, and by extension, public security services and youth uniformed organizations.

== Common drill commands ==
=== Without weapons ===
- Fall in. Have designated troops move into formation on the parade square and/or ground.
- Fall out. Have designated troops to face the commander to be dismissed.
- Dismissed. Telling designated units to leave the parade square/ground.
- Attention Have the soldiers adopt the at attention position.
- Stand fast. Individual soldiers remain at the attention position regardless of the movement of others in the formation.

==== Rest positions ====
- Stand at ease (United States: parade rest) has the soldiers in a more relaxed position. The left foot is moved roughly 10 inches to the left from the position of attention so they are shoulder length apart. Simultaneously, they clasp their hands behind their backs with the left hand resting flat on the small of the back and the right hand resting flat on top of the left. Their fingers are extended and joined, thumbs interlocked and palms are facing out behind them. No movement is permitted.
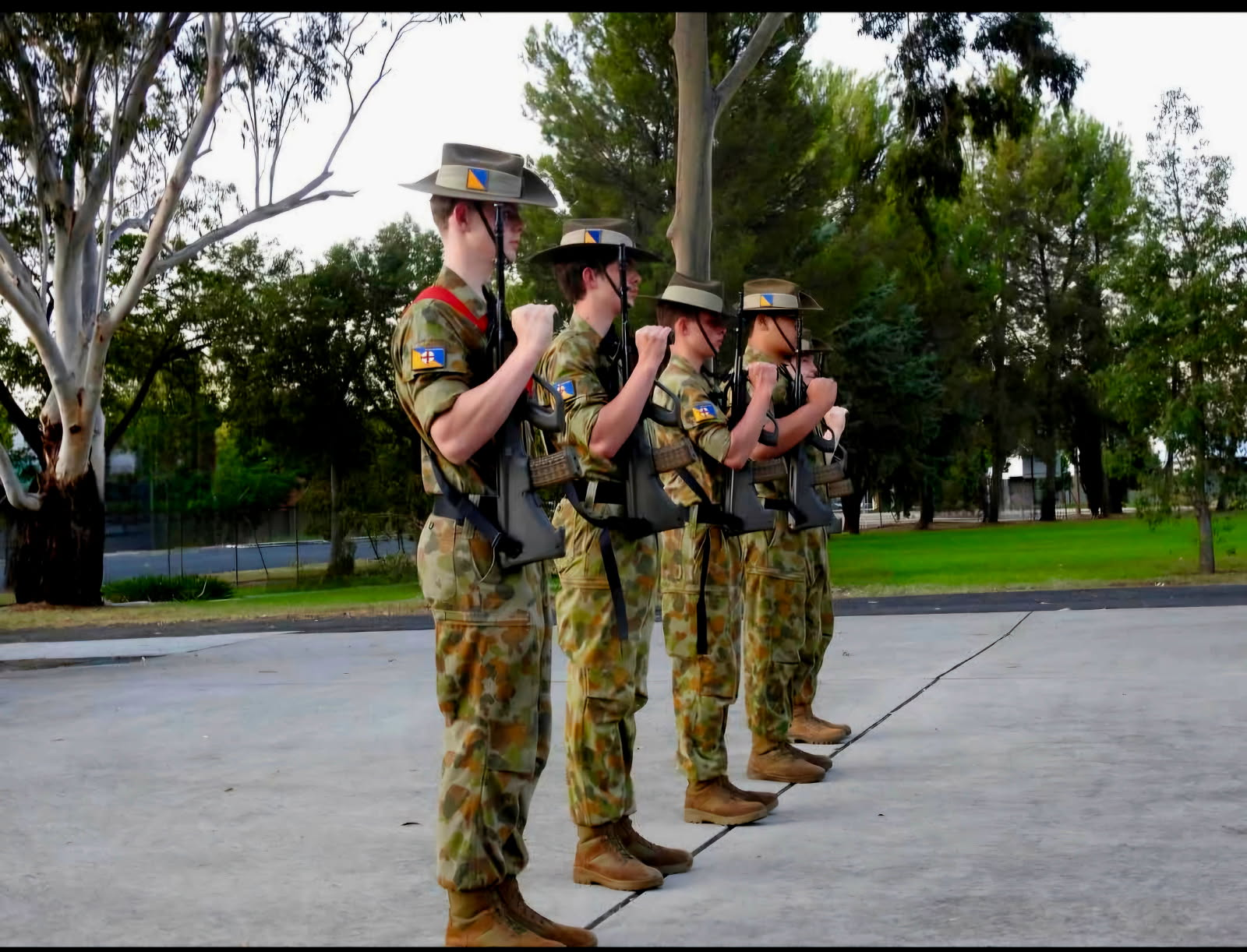
- Australian Army Cadets from 2/19 ACU Wagga Wagga performing a Present Arms with the EF88
  Stand easy (United States: at ease) has the soldiers adopt the next easiest stance, where hands are still clasped behind the back; however, the soldiers can relax their upper bodies (the shoulders can be slacked) and quietly speak. This is often, but not always, followed by an implicit "relax" ("rest"). This is typically used when being addressed or lectured for a long period of time where the positions of attention or at ease would be too painful or uncomfortable to hold.
- Relax (United States: rest): The only parade instruction given in an ordinary voice, rather than the raised, emphatic parade voice. This is the only position that actually offers soldiers freedom of movement. Soldiers are typically allowed to move other than moving their feet, though, when it is given by a high-ranking officer, soldiers typically move a minimal amount after a bit of stretching.

==== Dressing ====
- Right dress – all personnel except the right marker bring up their left arms parallel to the ground. At the same time, all members of the formation snap their heads so they are facing right. After this, they pause, and then shuffle back to a new position, where their shoulder is extremely close to the soldier's hand on their right, unless otherwise specified. The American version of this is called dress right, dress.
- Left dress – all personnel except the left marker bring up their right arms parallel to the ground. At the same time, all members of the formation snap their heads so they are facing left. After this, they pause, and then shuffle back to a new position, where their shoulder is extremely close to the soldier's hand on their left, unless otherwise specified. The American version of this is called dress left, dress.
- Inwards dress/centre dress – used when a parade is formed up in two or more groups with colours, guidons, or banners on parade. This is used so that dressing is off the colours. The formations to the left of the colour party will dress to the right and the formations to the right of the colour party will dress to the left. All personnel to the right of the colours in front row and left column except the left marker take one step forward, pause, and only the front rank bring up their left arms parallel to the ground. At the same time, all members of the formation snap their heads so they are facing left. All personnel to the left of the colours in front row and right side column except the right marker take one step forward, pause, and only the front rank bring up their right arms parallel to the ground. At the same time, all members of the formation snap their heads so they are facing right.
- Eyes front (United States: ready front) – the front rank snaps their arms down and faces forward, while all other ranks simply face forward.

=== With weapons ===
==== Rifles ====
- Shoulder/slope arms: The rifle is brought on the left or right sides by the shoulder.
- Change arms (Commonwealth only): When the rifle is being carried at the slope, trail or shoulder, it is changed from one side of the body to the other.
- Present arms: The soldiers bring their weapons to the front of their bodies, and adjust their right foot position. Soldiers without weapons use a salute appropriate for their headdress. In the United Kingdom and the Commonwealth of Nations, the command is often preceded with a general salute or royal/presidential/national salute, when appropriate.
- Order arms: Servicemen carrying a weapon lower the butt of the weapon to the ground, muzzle vertical.
- Port arms: The weapon is brought out in front of the soldier, and held by the right hand on small of the butt, or equivalent, and the left hand about the forestock, or equivalent.
- High port arms: The weapon is brought out in front of the soldier in the form similar to Port Arms but higher so that the butt and forestock or equivalent is raised.
- For inspection, port arms (United States: inspection arms): The weapon are raised at the port position in order that it can be properly inspected.
- Reverse arms: The weapon is held reversed as a sign of mourning.
- Ground arms: Servicemen bring their rifles to the ground.
- Trail arms: Servicemen bring their grip from the pistol grip to the carrying handle of the rifle in order to carry the rifle horizontally
- Sling arms: If the soldiers have a "sling" (strap) on their rifles, then this command can be called. The soldiers will loosen the sling so they can now have their rifles strapped around their shoulders.
- Unsling arms: Servicemen will unloosen the sling so they can now have their rifles at the port or high port position.
- Front sling arms: Servicemen holding weapons with slings attached to the chest now sling those weapons in the Port or High Port Arms position.
- Fire of joy, load weapons: This command is used in parades such as the National Day Parade in Singapore, and trooping the colour. Soldiers will load the rifle with the blank round in preparation of the feu de joie, French for "fire of joy" in parades. In Polish this is called the Salwa Honorowa and in Hebrew it's called ירי כבוד, or honor volley.
- Fix bayonets: In US ceremonies, whenever the bayonets are to be fixed to the weapons, this command is called out. In times, the accompanying bugle call for it is used before the order is done. The troops pull out their bayonets from their uniforms and attach them to the weapon.
- Unfix bayonets: Soldiers in formation remove their bayonets from their rifles and return them to their uniforms.

==== Sabres ====
- Draw sabres: used to draw the sabres.
- Return sabres: used to return the sabres.
- Present sabres: used for officers to salute using their sabres.
- Shoulder/slope sabres: used for officers to slope the sabre in their left-hand shoulder.
- Order sabres: the sabre is lowered to the ground after presenting or sloping.

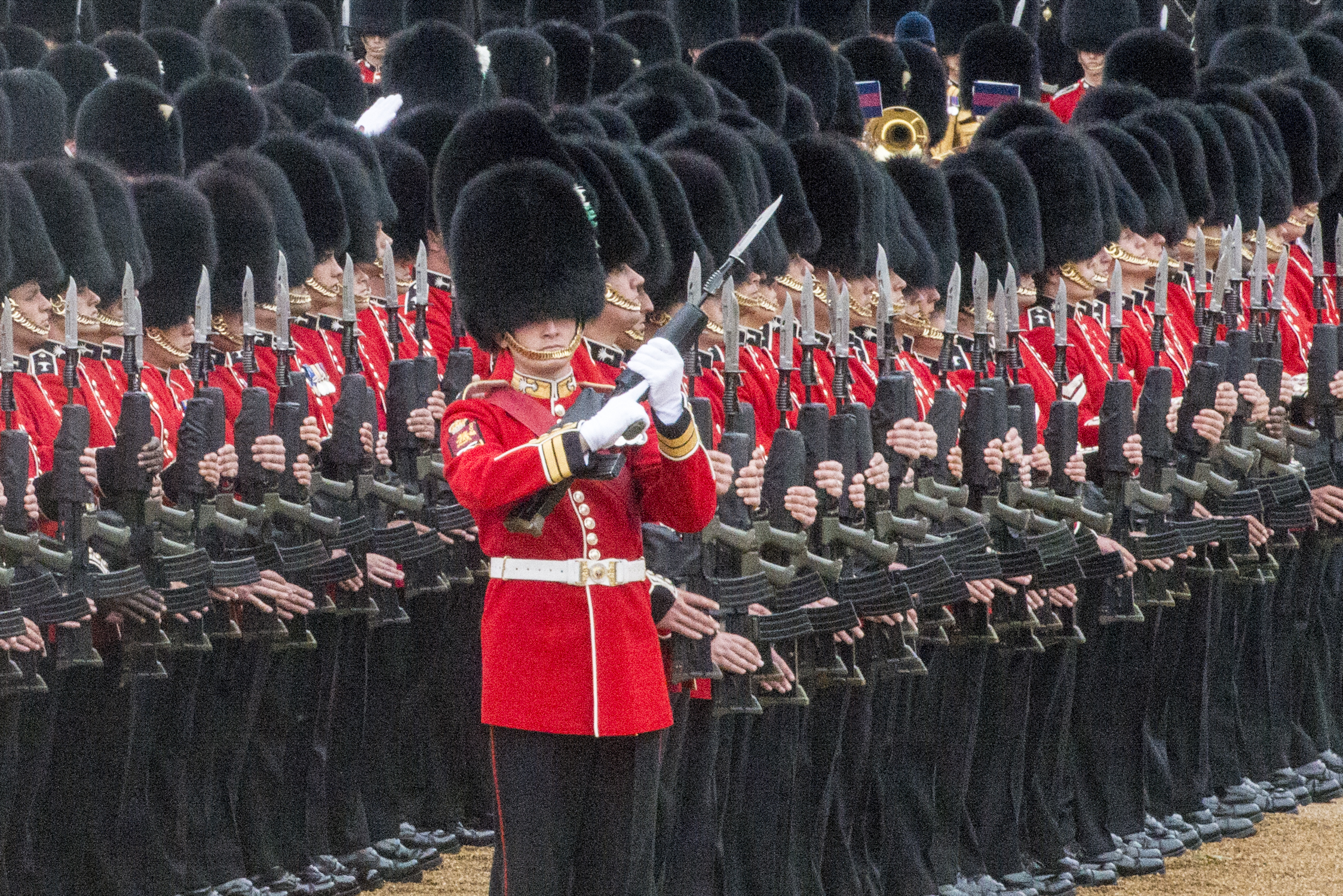
A British soldier in the port arms position

=== Forming the parade for the march past/pass in review ===
- Pass in review – used in the US to denote the start of the march past segment of parades. When this command is said the parade prepares in readiness for the march past. It is also used as a way for newly assigned commanders to inspect the troops they command.

- Parade, in close order, left/right dress – in the UK, this command is used to commence dressing of parade units in close order

- Company, in close order, form three/four ranks – in the UK, this command is used to form companies into three or four ranks of personnel each

- Staff behind me, (forward) march – in the US, this command is used by the parade commander to form his parade staff in readiness for the march past/pass in review segment of parades

- Parade will now advance/retire in slow/quick time, about turn – in the Commonwealth the command is used to form parade formations when arranged in line formation for the march past

- Distance by a single lineman - in the former Soviet Union and in countries that were trained by the Soviet Armed Forces (except the Baltics) this ensures that the distance of the formations of parade (either of company or battalion size) be equal to those of the parade armed linemen that line the parade grounds or square for the march past

- Move to the right/left in twos/threes/fours - in the Commonwealth, this command is used for a company or companies to execute left/right turn forming either two, three or four ranks

=== Saluting on the march ===
In the Commonwealth countries, the following saluting on the march commands are ordered with a preparatory command of Saluting on the march.... For example, Saluting on the march, to the front salute and always called on the left foot.

- To the front salute or salute: The parade is halted and the right arm is raised so the forearm is placed at a 90° angle, while pointing at the temple. This is lowered and then repeated again, followed by an about turn and a resume in marching (off the left foot). The timing is: "Call, check, halt, 2, 3, up, 2, 3, down, 2, 3, 4, 5, up, 2, 3, down, 2, 3, about, 2, 3, in, 2, 3, left, right, left." It is one of, if not the longest drill movement in the military.

In British corps, the drill movement for saluting to the front is the following. Two, three, up. Two, three, down.

- To the right salute: The right arm is raised so the forearm is placed at a 90° angle, while pointing at the temple. It is generally to a count of "Up, two, three, four, five, down, swing!"

This is done while looking to the right, except the right marker, who must stay looking to the front, to keep the flight, squad, platoon, etc. staying straight.

- To the left salute: The right arm is raised so the forearm is placed at a 90° angle, while pointing at the temple. It is generally to a count of "Up, two, three, four, five, down, away!"

This is done while looking to the left, except the left marker (as they are the front most of the saluting flank), who must stay looking to the front, to keep the flight, squad, platoon, etc. staying straight.

In the United States, the command for saluting on the march is "Eyes, right/eyes left". The parade formation commander and other officers execute the hand salute or execute sabre salute if available (especially if full dress uniform is worn) (and if present on parade the company guidon bearers dip them in salute about 90 degrees above the ground), while everyone but the right file or left file in either case turns their heads to the right. The command for recovery is "Ready, front." If the command does not have rifles, they will salute if given the command Present arms. The arms will be lowered back to their normal position on the commands Order arms. They can also salute if given the command Hand salute. The salute is raised when the parade leader finishes saying "salute", and is lowered in after being held for the same amount of time elapsed between the words "hand" and "salute."

=== Compliments on the march ===
- Eyes right: The parade turn their heads to the right after a check pace. The parade leader salutes while looking in the direction they gave.

This is done while looking to the right, except the right marker, who must stay looking to the front, to keep the flight, squad, platoon, etc. staying straight.

- Eyes left: Similar to the eyes right except the parade looks to the left.

This is done while looking to the left, except the left marker, who must stay looking to the front, to keep the flight, squad, platoon, etc. staying straight.

==== Saluting at the halt (static) ====
- To the front salute or salute: The right arm is raised so the forearm is placed at a 90° angle, while pointing at the temple. It is generally to a count of "Up, two, three, down!"
- To the right salute: The right arm is raised so the forearm is placed at a 90° angle, while pointing at the temple. It is generally to a count of "Up, two, three, down!"
- To the left salute: The right arm is raised so the forearm is placed at a 90° angle, while pointing at the temple. It is generally to a count of "Up, two, three, down!"

In the United States, salutes at a halt are given on the command "hand salute". They are lowered in the same amount of time elapsed between the two words. The command "present arms" will cause the command to salute if the command is not given rifles for the ceremony, but the salute will be held until they are ordered to lower it with the command "order arms".

- Advance in review order, by the centre, quick march: This is used to pay final compliments to the reviewing officer. On this very command the unit being reviewed advances 15 paces and halts automatically before presenting arms to the reviewing officer. It is usually employed by the British Army and the Canadian Army, as well as by other Commonwealth armed forces.

=== Colour commands ===
==== Marching with colours ====
- Let fly the colours: The colours are normally held in a semi-taut position. This is a simple, ceremonial letting fly and catching of the colours.
- Slant colours: The colours are normally kept upright, but this can represent a problem both when dealing with standard doors. This slants the colours forward sufficiently to negate this, and they are brought back up afterward.
- Slope/shoulder colours: The normal method for carrying colours can be tiresome for the bearer. This has the colours taken out of their frogs and sloped over the right shoulder at about 45°.
- March on/off (retire) the colours - this vocal command by the parade commander orders the colour guard or massed colour guards either to get into position or prepare for departure in the parade square or ground during the ceremony
- Colour party, (by the) centre/right, (quick) march - the command given by the commander of the colour party for it to commence marching. A single colour is at the centre-front of the colour party and dressing is taken off it (by the centre). Where there are two or more colours in the colour party, the senior colour takes the right-front position and dressing is taken from it (by the right). If the colour party changes direction on the march, it does so in a way that the senior colour maintains the senior position.

==== Colour commands at the halt (static) ====
- Order colours: Essentially the same as order arms, except used exclusively for the colour party.
- Carry colours: This is equivalent to Shoulder Arms. The right arm lifts the colours up so they line up with the body's centre line, with the right arm held in front of the soldier, at mouth level parallel to the ground. It is caught and guided into its frog with the left hand, which is then returned to its side.
- Change colours: This is used when the senior flag officer decides that he or she and the other flag holding members, have held their flags for a long time, and that their arms are tired, so, when the command "Change - colours!" is given, the flag holders put their arms in line with the flag, their other hand on top of their first hand and move the first hand down to attention, so that the other hand is now at the first hands' original position.

=== Turning motions at the march ===
- Right turn (U.S.:Column right, march): A 90° turn to the right done by rotating on the right heel and left ball. The cautionary and executive are both called on the left foot. The left leg is then brought up to be parallel to the ground (although exceptions are made for kilted regiments) and slammed into the ground in the position of attention. This motion is done at a particular fixed point.
- Left turn (U.S.:Column left, march): A 90° turn to the left, done by rotation on the right ball and the left heel. The right leg is then brought up to be parallel to the ground and slammed down into attention. This motion is done at a particular fixed point.
- About turn (U.S.: To the rear, march): A 180° turn to the right, done as an exaggerated version of the right turn. United States units do not make exaggerated gestures with the legs or arms.
- Right flank march or right turn, it is still the same even on the march for some countries: All members marching execute 90° turn to the right done by rotating on the right heel and left ball.
- Left flank march or left turn, it is still the same even on the march for some countries: All members marching 90° turn to the left, done by rotation on the right ball and the left heel.
- Right incline (U.S.:Column half-right, march), is a half turn to the right, usually used when a flight, squad, platoon, etc. is not in its proper alignment. All members marching turn by 45° to the right, done by rotation on the left ball and the right heel.
- Left incline (U.S.:Column half-left, march), is a half turn to the left, usually used when a flight, squad, platoon, etc. is not in its proper alignment. All members marching turn by 45° to the left, done by rotation on the right ball and the left heel.
- Right wheel, is a turn to the right, differentiated from a right turn in that the order of march remains the same. During a wheel, the rank that is wheeling should all look inwards, with the inside taking smaller paces, and the outside taking larger to remain dressed properly.
- Left wheel, is a mirror of the right wheel.

==== Turning motions at the halt (static) ====
United States Armed Forces:

- Right face: The body is rotated on the heel of the right foot and then the left heel is brought forward to meet the right heel in the position of attention.
- Left face: A mirror image of right face.
- About face: The right toe is brought back to behind the left heel; the body pivots on the right toe and left heel 180°.
- Half-left face: Exactly the same as a left face, but one turns only 45°.
- Half-right face: Exactly the same as a right face, but one turns only 45°.

Commonwealth of Nations

- Right turn: The body is rotated 90° to the right members shall bend the left knee, straighten it in double time and smartly place the left foot beside the right to assume the position of attention. In the Royal Navy, the heel movements mirror that of the US Armed Forces.
- Left turn: A mirror image of right turn.
- About turn: The body is rotated 180° in a clockwise direction, knees locked. Members shall bend the left knee, straighten it in double time and smartly place the left foot beside the right to assume the position of attention. In the Royal Navy heel movements are the same for right face.
- Right incline: Exactly the same as a right turn, but one turns only 45°.
- Left incline: Exactly the same as a left turn, but one turns only 45°.

=== Marching motions ===
- Quick march: The standard pace is typically 116 beats/minute with a 30in. step. There is also a rifleman's pace, 140 beats per minute and a Highland pace, 110 beats per minute (typically done with a kilt.) The pace is based on the individual regiments, the pace given by the commander, and the speed of the band's rhythm. The way the march is performed depends on the regiment's nationality.
- Slow march: This is a ceremonial pace, used for funerals and when a unit's colours are marched out in front of the troops. The standard pace is 65 beats per minute.
- Half step march or cut the pace:

- This is a U.S. march pace. It is at the same tempo as quick time, but instead of 30 inches, the step is 15 inches.
- There is also a Canadian and Commonwealth version of this, used for when the front file/rank is getting too far ahead of the rest of the flight, squad, or platoon, it means that front file/rank should make their steps smaller, to allow for the rest of the flight, squad, or platoon, to get back into a proper dressing.

- Double march: This is essentially a moderate jog at approximately 180 paces per minute. It creates a travel speed of approximately double that of quick time, designed to be used even when carrying heavy burdens. This is often erroneously used to describe a sprint or an ordinary run. The U.S. command is Double time, march.
- Easy march: This is an unrestricted march at approximately Quick Time. This is designed for field marches and other rough conditions, though is not used in combat areas. The U.S. command is Route step, march. In the Canadian Forces the command March at, ease is given while the unit is on the march. It can not be given from the halt.
- Mark time: This is essentially a stationary march with the knees coming up parallel to the ground or the foot dangling six inches off of the ground. This is designed to maintain the time of large parades when portions need no forward speed. The U.S. equivalent command is Mark time, march.
- Step for -ward or forward or forward, march: This causes troops marking time to resume a normal march.

== Historical drill commands for parade ==
=== Musket drill ===
The 18th-century musket, as typified by the brown Bess, was loaded and fired in the following way:

1. Upon the command prime and load the soldier would bring the musket to the priming position, with the pan opened.
2. Upon the command handle cartridge the soldier would draw a cartridge. Cartridges consisted of a spherical lead bullet wrapped in a paper cartridge which also held the gunpowder propellant. The bullet was separated from the powder charge by a twist in the paper.
3. The soldier would then bite off the top of the cartridge (the end without the bullet) and hold it closed with the thumb and index finger.
4. Upon the command prime. The soldier would pour a small pinch of the powder from the cartridge into the priming pan. He would then close the frizzen so that the priming powder was trapped.
5. Upon the command bout (about) the butt of the musket was then dropped to the ground by the left foot with the trigger guard facing to the rear and the soldier having just poured the rest of the powder into the barrel. Once all of the powder was poured into the barrel, the soldier would have stuffed the paper and the ball into the barrel, the paper acted as wadding to keep the gunpowder in the barrel and also packed it down.
6. Upon the command draw ramrods the soldier would draw his ramrod from below the barrel. First forcing it half out before seizing it backhanded in the middle, followed by drawing it entirely out, while simultaneously turning it to the front and placing it one inch into the barrel.
7. Upon the command ram down the cartridge he would then use the ramrod to firmly ram the bullet, wadding, and powder down to the bottom followed by tamping it down with two quick strokes.
8. Upon the command return ramrods the ramrod was then returned to its hoops under the barrel. Then the musket was returned to the shoulder arms position.
9. Upon the command make ready the musket was brought to the recover position (held vertically in front of the body with the trigger guard facing forward) and the cock (hammer) was drawn back to the full-cock position.
10. Upon the command "P'sent" (present) the musket was brought up to the firing position in anticipation of the command fire.
- Under battle conditions, many of these commands were combined for speed and efficiency. On the command prime and load troops would, without further order, carry out all movements up to and including make ready. Because of the size of the companies and the general noise of battle, these commands could be and were often communicated through specialized drum beatings.
- This process was drilled into troops until they could do it by instinct and feel. The main advantage of the British Redcoats was that they trained at this procedure almost every day. The standard for the British Army was the ability to load and fire three rounds per minute. A skilled unit of musketeers was often able to fire four rounds per minute.

=== Cavalry drill ===
Cavalry drill had the purpose of training cavalrymen and their horses to work together during a battle. It survives to this day, albeit in a much-diminished form, in the modern sporting discipline of dressage. The movements sideways or at angles, the pirouettes, etc., were the movements needed for massed cavalrymen to form and reform and deploy. Of the proponents of classical dressage from which modern dressage evolved, probably the best known are the Lipizzaner Stallions of the Spanish Riding School in Vienna. The Royal Canadian Mounted Police's Musical Ride gives an inkling of what massed cavalry drill at speed would have looked like.

=== Other drills ===
Other tasks may be broken down into drills; for example, weapons maintenance in the British army used the rhythmic "naming of parts" as a memory aid in the teaching and learning of how to strip, clean, and reassemble the service rifle.

== See also ==
- Drill team
- Exhibition drill
- Drill (disambiguation)
- Military parade
