= Marching =

Formal style of walking

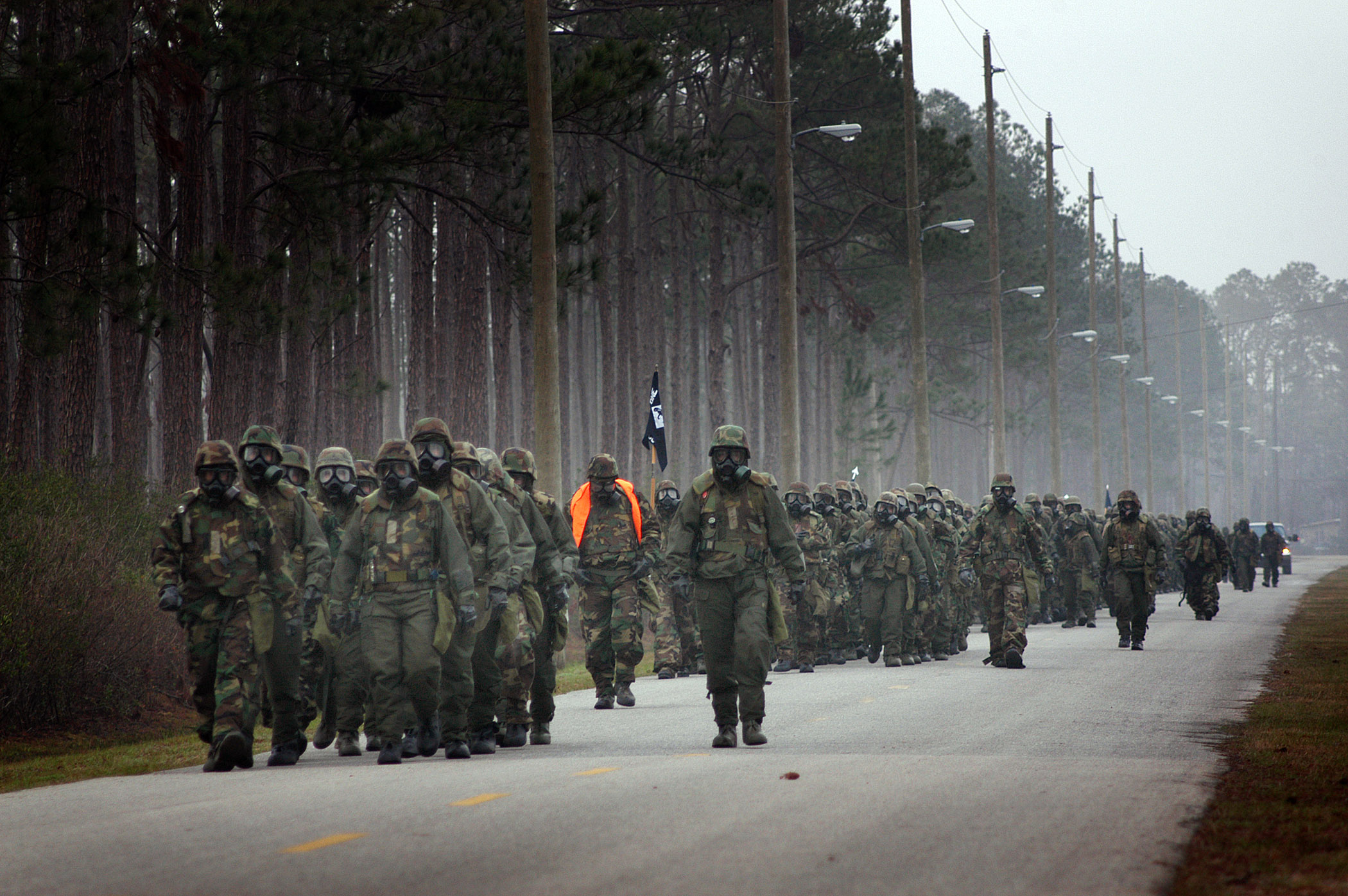
US Naval Construction Battalion NMCB-1 (US Navy Seabees) marching in route.

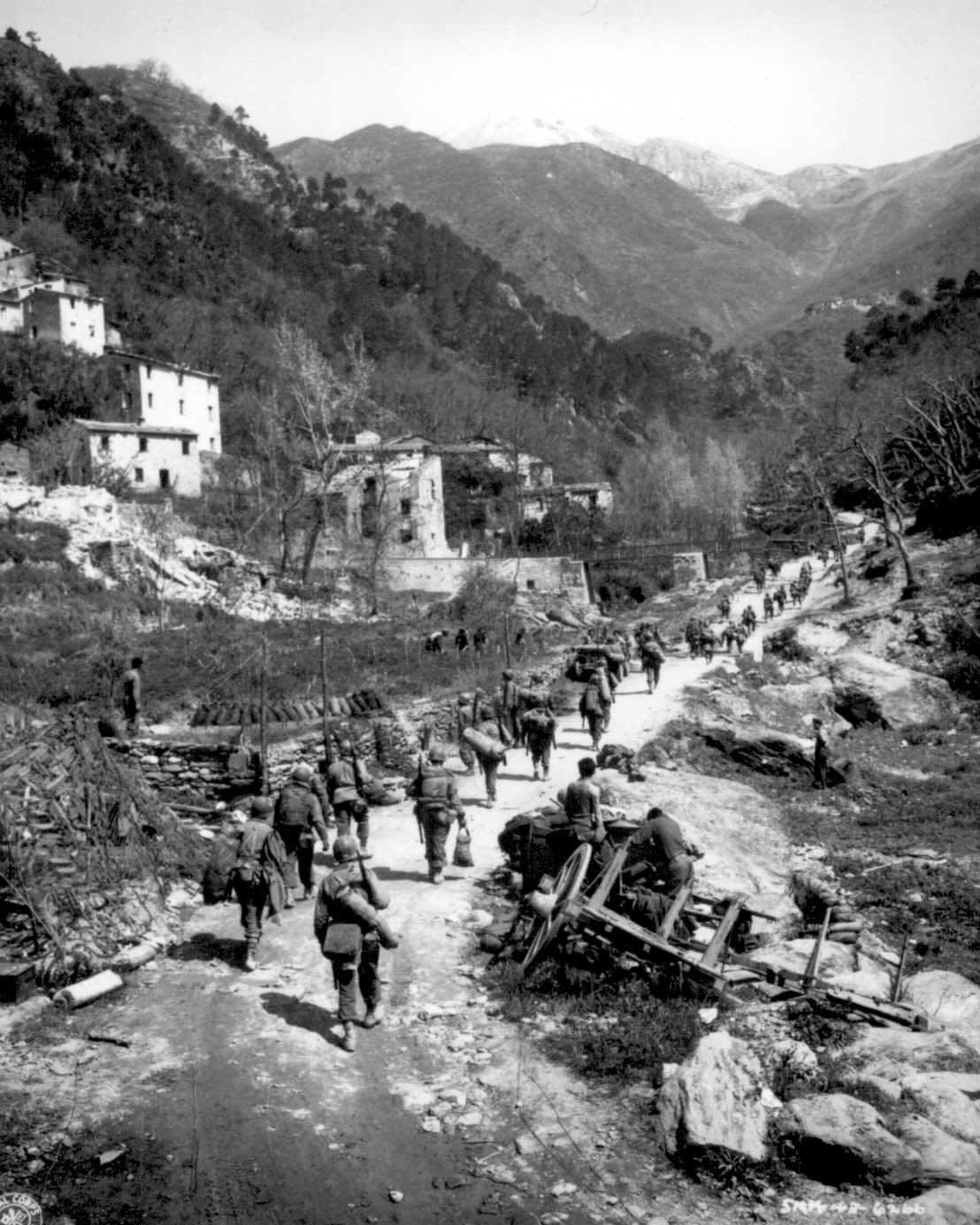
370th Infantry Regiment, US Army, in route-step march toward the mountains north of Prato, Italy, (the Gothic Line) – April 1945.

Marching refers to the organized, uniformed, steady walking forward in either rhythmic or route-step time; and, typically, it refers to overland movements on foot of military troops and units under field orders. Marching is often performed to march music and is typically associated with military and civilian ceremonial parades. It is a major part of military basic training in most countries and usually involves a system of drill commands. It can also be used as a general term to describe a protest in which protestors move such as the March on Washington for Jobs and Freedom, a watershed moment in the civil rights movement.

== Purpose ==
It is said that many ancient empires first developed marching as a way to move troops from one place to another without them getting mixed up with other troops. A soldier learning to march to drum cadences, martial music and shouted commands is considered an essential element of teaching military discipline.

In the United States Marine Corps, close order drill is used to promote exercise, obeying orders, discipline, morale, confidence, and leadership.

== Military paces ==
In the military venue there are various rhythmic military steps or standard paces. One step occurs on each beat. A pace is the length of one step, assumed to be 75 cm or 30"; (not to be confused with the ancient Roman unit of length (2 steps or 5 Roman feet = 148 cm or 58")). The three most common paces are:

- Quick march: The basic mobility. 120 beats per minute (beats/min. or bpm). In the US this is called "quick time".
- Double march: The basic run. 180 beats/min. In the US this is called "double time".
- Slow march: Ceremonial pace, 60 beats/min.

Some paces specific to particular units include:

- British armed services:
  - RAF, Royal Navy, and the army except the Rifles: Quick March 116 beats/min., Slow March 65 beats/min.
  - Rifles March: Quick March 140 beats/min. (like double-time, this is a rapid trot, with the rifle usually carried at the trail, not on the shoulder), Slow March 70 beats/min.
  - Highland March: Regiment-specific pace, 80 beats/min. when wearing kilts.
- French Foreign Legion Pace: 88 beats/min
- Paso Legionario: Specific march used by the Spanish Legion, 144 beats/min, embodiment of their "espíritu de marcha".
- Typical German speed is 112 beats/min.

== Techniques ==
Marching techniques vary across military steps, countries, branches of military, and context. For rhythmic marching, individuals must maintain their dress, cover, interval, and distance (DCID):

- dress — alignment with the person to the side;
- cover — alignment with the person in front;
- interval — space between the person(s) to the side;
- distance — space between the person in front.

For mechanical efficiency, opposite arms usually swing with each leg while marching. British and Commonwealth armed forces keep their arms straight and swing the hand as high as the shoulder while forward and in theory to the level of the belt when backward. US Marines swing the arm six inches to the front and three inches to the rear while US Army Soldiers swing the arm nine inches to the front and six inches to the rear. Some European armies bend the arm during the swing. Many believe these differing practices help maintain rhythm for long route marches. US troops usually march long distances at "route step" which does not require them to maintain a specific pace or length of step. Some South American and Eastern European countries march on parade with the stiff leg earlier famous as the "goose step" of German troops. German and Scandinavian military bands and units swing with only the right arm, 90 degrees straight out. Some troops (like the Royal Swedish Lifeguard) swing with their left arm. This is because they carry their rifle in their right arm. The Royal Marines refer to a long distance march carrying full kit as a yomp. The most famous yomp of recent times was during the 1982 Falklands War.

== Parades and protest ==
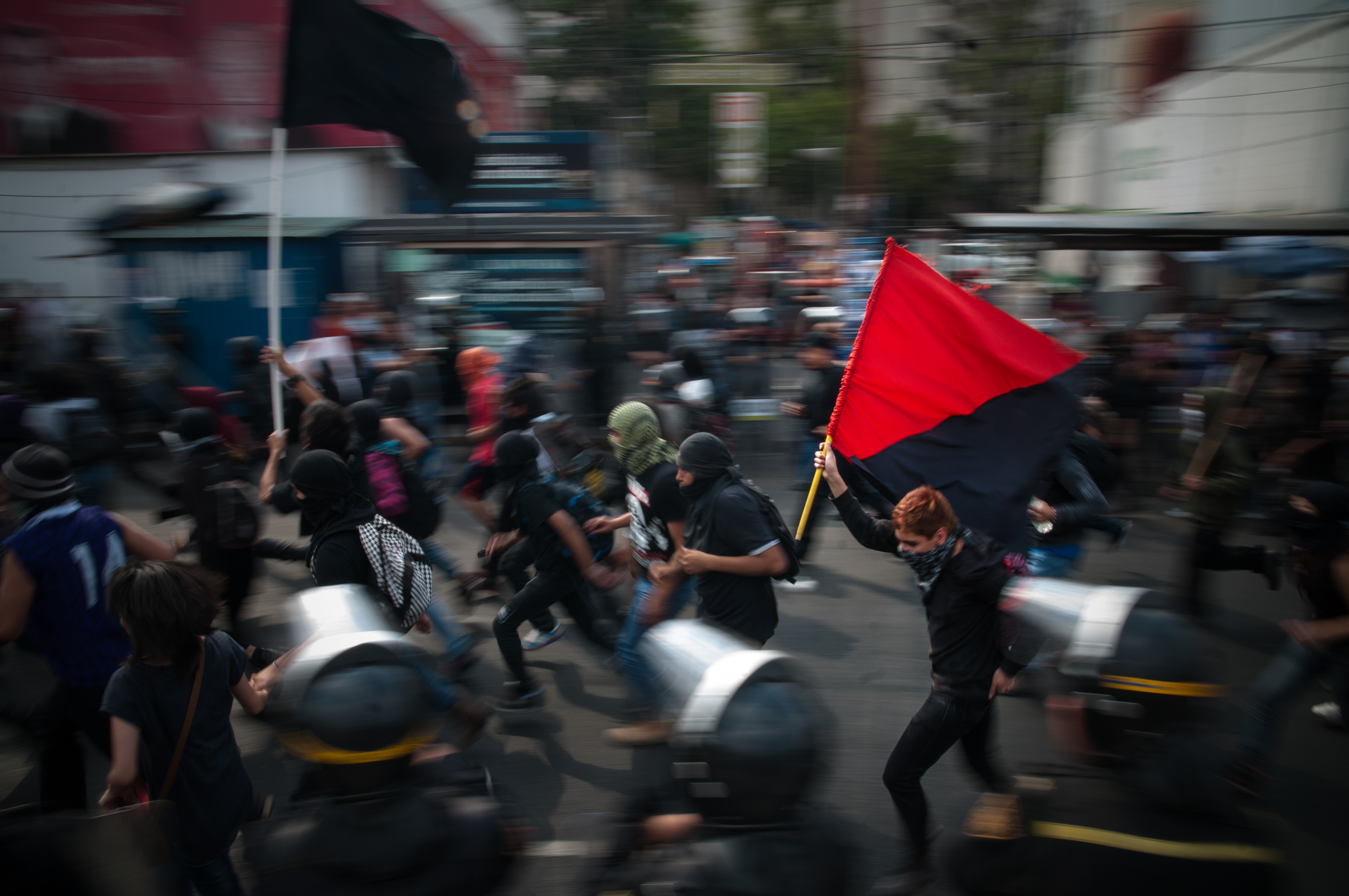
Protestors marching in opposition to an anti-protest law

For some people, marching is a major provocative ritual. In Northern Ireland, for example, hundreds of marches occur annually. These are usually organized by groups such as the Orange Order, which provide most of the participants. Music is provided by marching bands including silver bands, flute bands and others. Marching is often seen as a symbol of control over a particular area, and marching is often seen as a sectarian activity.

Marching is often used - in the UK at least - during Armistice Day as a show of respect to those who fell during all wars and is done at the "slow march" from a pre-defined meeting place to the cenotaph. The march usually consists of Active Duty and Retired Military Personnel, Cadet Corps, Relatives and volunteer civilians.

During the civil rights movement, marches across cities were used as method to protest against civil injustice by civil disobedience, such as causing blockades, shutting down infrastructure, and to make protestors goals known.

== See also ==
- Drill team
- Exhibition drill
- Goose step
- Loaded march
- Lockstep marching
- Majorettes
- Marching (sport)
- March (music)
- Marching arts
- Marching band
- Military step
- Parade
