= Goose step =

Marching step involving rigid, straight legs

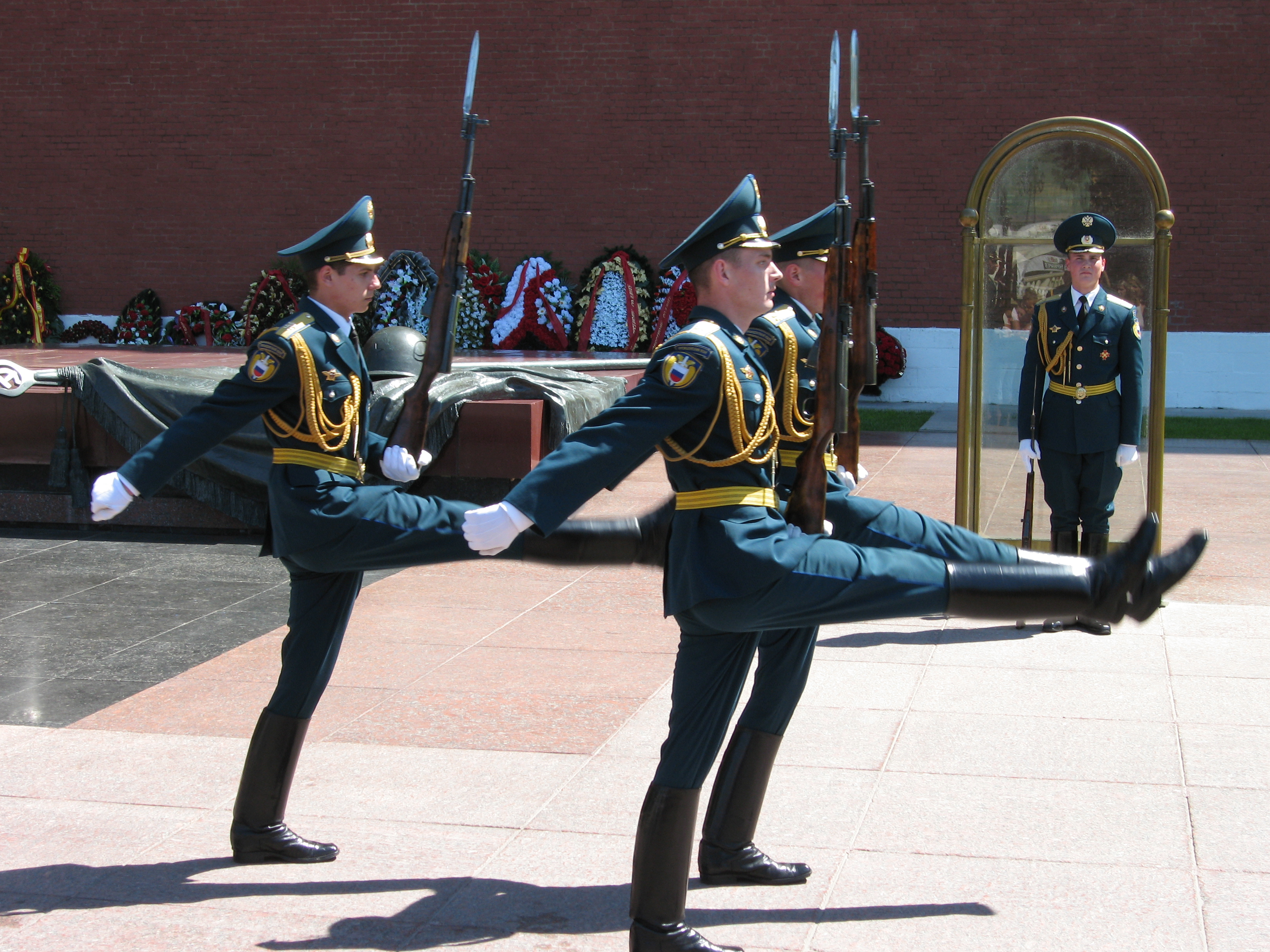
Russian Kremlin Guards goose stepping at slow march at the Tomb of the Unknown Soldier, Moscow

The goose step is a special marching step which is performed during formal military parades and other ceremonies. While marching in parade formation, troops swing their legs in unison off the ground while keeping each leg rigidly straight.

The step originated in Prussian military drill in the mid-18th century and was called the Stechschritt (literally, "piercing step") or Stechmarsch. German military advisors spread the tradition to Russia in the 19th century, and the Soviets spread it around the world in the 20th century.

The term "goose step" originally referred to balance stepping, an obsolete formalized slow march. The term is nowadays heavily associated with Nazi Germany and the Soviet Union in many English-speaking countries. As a result, the term has acquired a pejorative meaning in English-speaking countries.

== History ==
=== Origin ===
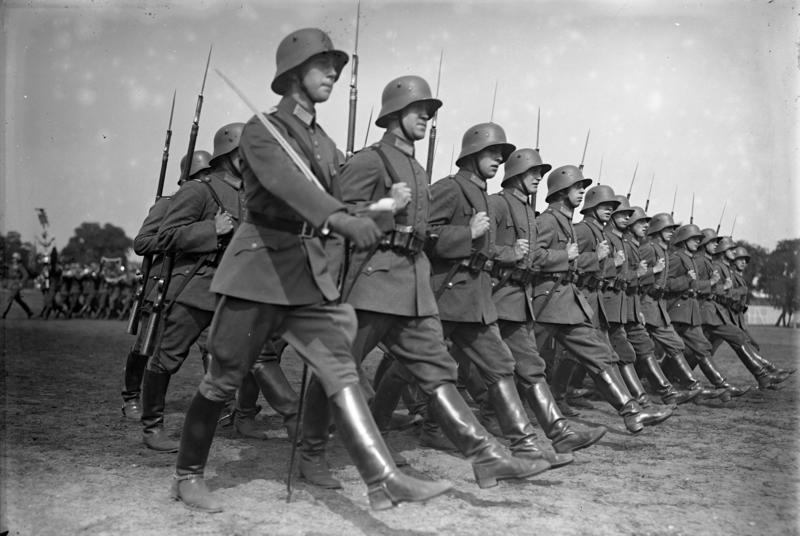
German soldiers of the Weimar Republic's Reichswehr goosestepping in 1930.

The Stechschritt originated in the 18th century, like other march steps, as a method of keeping troops lined up properly as they advanced towards enemy lines. It was introduced into German military tradition by Leopold I, Prince of Anhalt-Dessau, a Field Marshal whose close attention to training transformed the Prussian infantry into one of the most formidable armed forces in Europe. Other armies adopted different march steps that served the same purpose. The Russian Empire adopted the goose step during the 1796–1801 reign of Paul I.

By the mid-19th century, the replacement of muskets with rifles greatly increased the accuracy of defensive fire. It was too hazardous to march forward into battle in precise formation, and the practice of marching towards enemy lines became obsolete. However, armed forces continued to drill recruits in marching techniques for the purposes of team building, military uniformity, and ceremonial functions. This was true in Prussia and the later German Empire, where the goose step became emblematic of military discipline and efficiency.

=== Adoption outside Europe ===
The goose step became widespread in militaries around the world in the 19th and 20th centuries. Military modernization and political influence carried the practice to Asia, Africa, and Latin America from its origins in Prussia and Russia.

The first wave of adoption took place in the late 19th century, as the Prussian army became greatly admired for its decisive victory in the Franco-Prussian War. This led many countries to modernize their military forces along the Prussian model. Goose stepping continued to gain ground even after Germany's defeat in World War I, as many nations still looked to the German model for military organization and training.

The Chilean Army was the first non-European country to adopt the goose step, importing many Prussian military traditions after the War of the Pacific. The practice of goose stepping then spread widely throughout Latin America from Chilean influence.

Meanwhile, in Asia, the Beiyang New Army of Imperial China also adopted goose stepping together with the Prussian military model. After its dissolution, the National Revolutionary Army of the successive Republic of China continued the practice, also because that they were being trained by German advisers in the 1920s; after the Communists won the Chinese Civil War, the People's Liberation Army of People's Republic of China would follow suit and bring the practice into present day, owing to both tradition and its own Soviet influence. They account for the largest single goose-stepping military today.

=== Cold War ===
During the Cold War, the Soviet Union trained the military forces of many of its client states with Soviet military drill and ceremonial practices. This led to the second great wave of goose step adoption, as it was introduced into many Third World countries in Asia and Africa. Meanwhile, the United States, United Kingdom, and France were, through efforts in their client republics and allies, preventing the use of the goose step in their armed services. A divided Germany was also divided in their armies' foot drill; the East German Nationale Volksarmee kept the goose step (although it incoorperated some Soviet-style goose step elements), while the West German Bundeswehr only kept the Gleichschritt (quick march). The centuries-long German practice of goose-stepping finally ended in 1990, when the former was absorbed into the latter due to German reunification.

== Usage ==
=== Ceremonial usage ===
The goose step is a difficult marching style that takes much practice and choreography in order to coordinate the timing of each person's step with one another. It is therefore reserved for ceremonial occasions such as military parades. Because it is difficult to maintain for long periods of time, troops typically only begin to goose-step when they approach the reviewing stand and return to a normal march step once they have marched past. Large military parades require several days of practice to ensure that troops can perform the goose step without injuring themselves. Preparatory training includes having soldiers march in small groups, with arms linked to maintain balance.

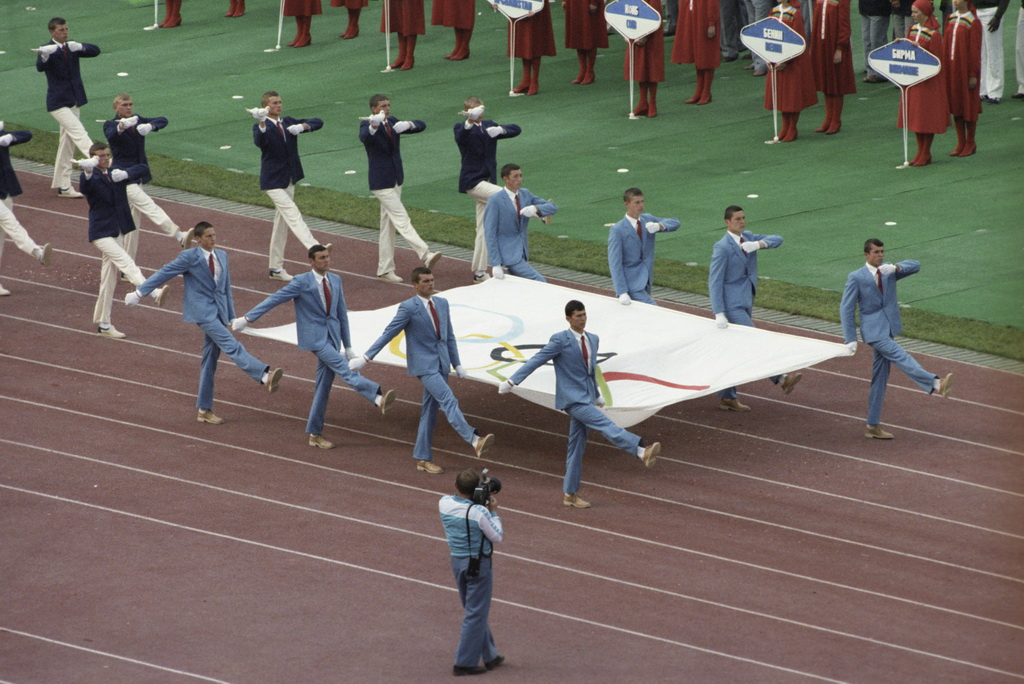
Athletes goose-stepping with the Olympic flag at the 1980 Summer Olympics in Moscow

Guards of honour also use the goose step during solemn ceremonies such as at war memorials or military cemeteries. The goose step has been featured in several Olympic opening ceremonies, as the host nation pays the same respect to the Olympic flag as to its own flag.

In the most rigorous form of the goose step, often found in guard mounting ceremonies, the pace is done at a slow march, and the leg is nearly horizontal, and sometimes well beyond. In a standard goose step, found in large military parades, the pace is done at a quick march and the leg is raised only to knee-height, or even to calf height. The lower goose step improves balance and unit cohesion at the tempo of a quick march. Flagbearers and honour guards will frequently march with a higher goose step than the mass of troops following.

=== Adopted countries ===
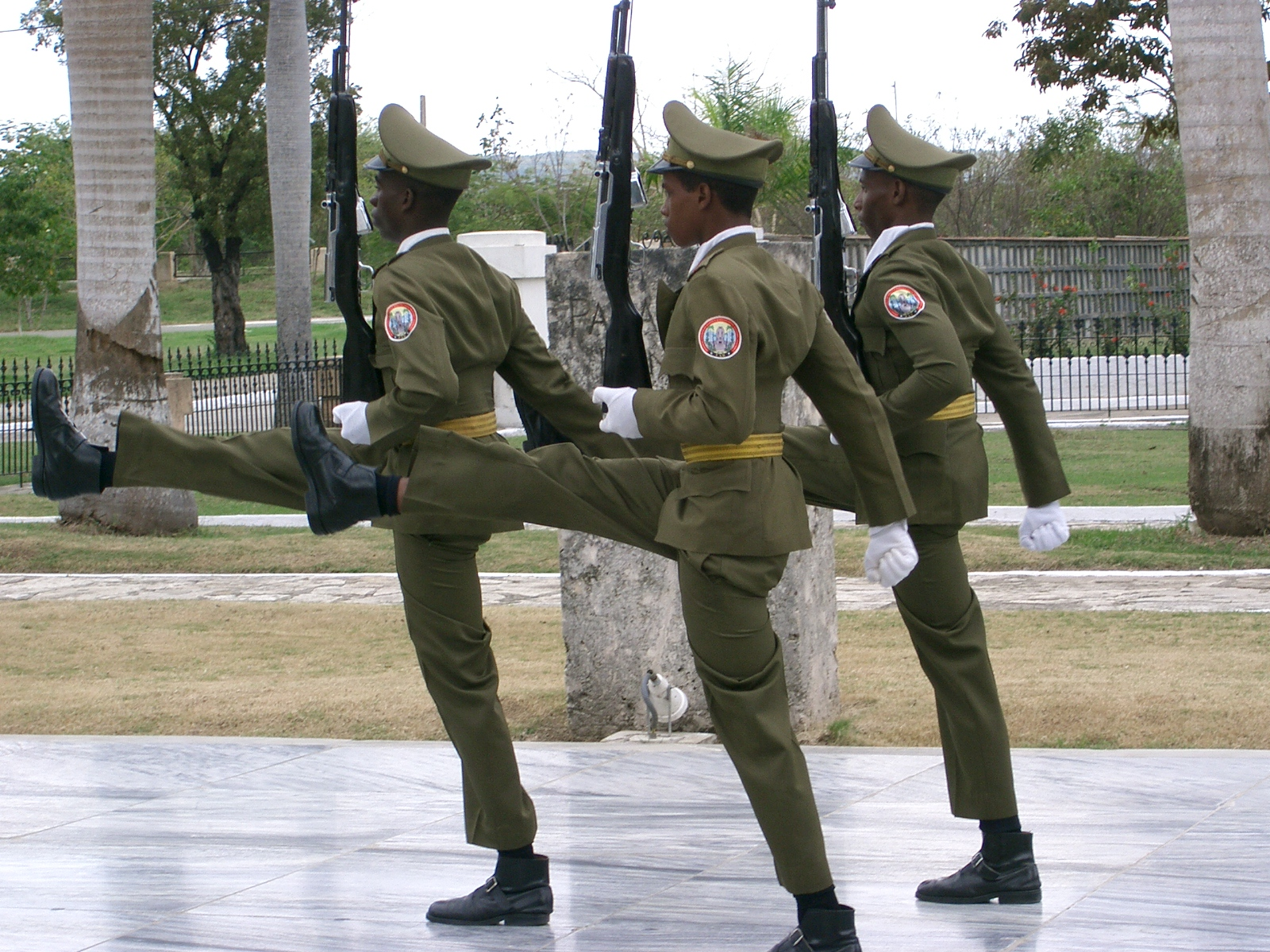
Cuban Honor Guards goose-stepping at the Mausoleum of José Martí, Santiago de Cuba

The goose step is a feature of military ceremonies in dozens of countries, to varying extents. Some countries use the goose step as a general parade step performed by all troops, while others reserve it for honour guards and ceremonial units.

==== Americas ====
The goose step is very popular in Latin America, where it has been adopted by most Spanish-speaking countries. It is not found in countries where English or Portuguese is an official language.

- Argentina: The Infantry Company of the Colegio Militar de la Nación uses a sort of goose half step (with the leg at approximately 45 degrees) as their parade step while passing in front of the authorities. The same step is used by the Guards Company of the National Gendarmerie Academy and its colour guard. Other units perform the high step instead.
- Bolivia: Some troops marching with this step similar to the Paraguayan forces step marching but in slower pace.
- Chile: Uses the Prussian form of the goose step essentially unaltered.
- Colombia
- Cuba: Uses the goose step styling inherited from the Soviet Union.
- Ecuador: Uses a waist-high goose step in military parades.
- El Salvador
- Guatemala: Only the marker squad of the Military Academy goose-steps.
- Haiti: The Haitian military was dissolved in 1996. However, demobilized soldiers have formed militias that continue to drill with the goose step. The government began reforming its armed forces in 2016, sending them to be trained by Latin American countries that use the goose step like Ecuador. Thus, the revived Haiti Armed Forces marches in like manner as in many South and Central American armed services which use the practice, combined with the French and American precedence.
- Honduras
- Mexico: adopted the goose step marching in early 1980s.
- Nicaragua
- Panama
- Paraguay: In military parades, cadets march with a waist-high goose step at the quick step. Other units do not goose-step.
- Peru
- Suriname: Suriname National Army uses the goose step for military parade purpose since the late 1990s.
- Venezuela: Only military officer cadets use the goose step for parade purposes; other units of the armed forces (save for special forces, which march on parade on the double) used the goose step until 1960 and from 2010 to 2017.

==== Europe ====
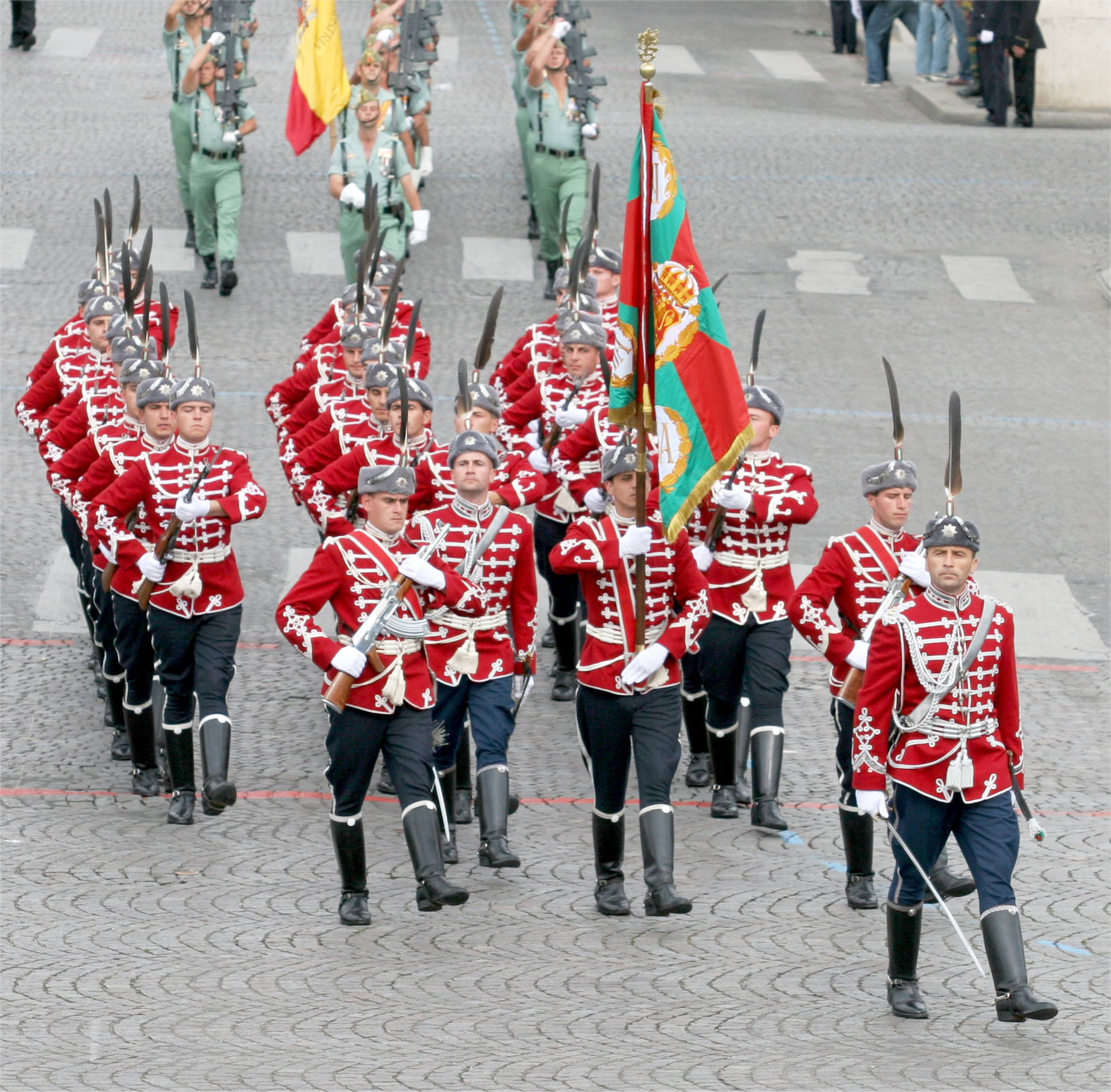
The National Guards Unit of Bulgaria goose-stepping in the Bastille Day Military Parade 2007 in Paris

Goose-stepping is found primarily in Central and Eastern Europe.

- Albania
- Armenia
- Azerbaijan
- Belarus
- Bulgaria
- Czech Republic: A moderate form of the goose step is performed by honour guards, with the foot raised only a few centimetres off the ground; these are the only units that use all the time. Other units of the military use it only during specific part of the ceremonial march when the command "eyes right" is given (generally in front of the platform when a most senior commander or dignitary is present).
- Estonia: Moderate goose step is the general parade step, which replaced the Soviet style in 2005.
- Georgia: While no longer in use, only two breakaway states in Abkhazia and South Ossetia use the goose step, as it is aligned with Russia.
- Hungary: Only color guards goose-step in slow time during military ceremonies.
- Latvia: Only selected guards goose-step in ceremonial purposes.
- Moldova: Only honour guards and color guards. The goose step continues to be used in the breakaway region of Transnistria.
- Norway
- Poland: Performed at 112–116 steps per minute, raising the feet 10 centimetres (3.9 in) off the ground.
- Russia
- Slovakia: Uses the goose step as a general parade step only by honor guards.
- Spain: Uses the goose step as a slow march for the most important ceremonies, such as royal funerals and the presentation of the colours. The goose step is not used for military parades or guard mounting ceremonies.
- Sweden
- Ukraine

==== Africa ====
Most African militaries trace their adoption of the goose step to the Cold War, when the Communist countries supplied them with military aid and training. The German colonies used the goose step until World War I, when they were absorbed by the victorious Allies, but all of them restored the goose step after independence.

- Algeria
- Angola: Uses the goose step as a general parade step.
- Benin
- Botswana: Although Botswana has British military traditions, it uses a goose step on a slow march and high step in quick march.
- Burkina Faso: Uses the goose step as a special march step for military bands and commando units. Other units do not goose-step.
- Burundi: Uses the goose step as a general parade step.
- Cameroon
- Central African Republic
- Chad: Does the goose step in slow time.
- Democratic Republic of the Congo
- Republic of the Congo
- Djibouti: At military parades, a horizontal goose step is performed at a slow march.
- Egypt
- Equatorial Guinea
- Eswatini
- Ethiopia
- Gabon
- Ghana: Only the Ghanaian Special Forces use the goose step in military parades.
- Ivory Coast
- Madagascar
- Mauritania
- Mozambique
- Namibia: When the country became independent from apartheid South Africa in 1990, it kept the British-style march step.
- Niger: uses goose step in slow marching time.
- Nigeria
- Rwanda: Uses a horizontal goose step for military parades. Rwanda received their military training in the goose-stepping country of Uganda. The new type of goose step was performed during the 25th anniversary of the end of the Rwandan genocide as the troops were trained by the Chinese PLA.
- Senegal
- Seychelles
- Tanzania
- Togo: Uses the goose step as a general parade step, performed at a slow march.
- Uganda

==== Middle East and Central Asia ====
- Afghanistan: Has used the goose step since the 1950s during the royal period of the country, thanks to advisers from the Soviet Armed Forces and from Iran. The tradition was carried on into the communist era, the U.S.-backed Islamic Republic and the second Taliban government.
- Iran: Has used the goose step since the Imperial era, as the country was influenced first by the Russian Empire. In the 1920s, there was an increase of foreign trade and technical collaboration with Germany, with Reichswehr advisers present in the army. The Islamic Republic's armed forces have continued the practice.
- Kazakhstan: Use of the goose step is a direct result of Soviet military influence on the country when it was a republic of the Soviet Union. On 3 February 2016, President Nursultan Nazarbayev ordered that personnel of the Kazakh Armed Forces march at 95–105 steps per minute raising the forward leg 10–15 centimetres (3.9–5.9 in) above the ground. This differs from their Russian counterparts who goose step at a rate of 120 steps per minute.
- Kyrgyzstan
- Lebanon: The Lebanese military does not perform the goose step. However, the Hezbollah paramilitary forces uses the goose step, as they are trained and supplied by Iran and North Korea.
- Qatar: Adopted the goose step in 2017, after receiving training from Chinese drill instructors.
- Syria: Adopted the goose step during the Cold War when it was aligned with the Soviet Union. Personnel of the Syrian Armed Forces continue to goose-step, while Kurdish forces have adopted the high step.
- Tajikistan
- Turkmenistan
- Uzbekistan
- Yemen

==== East Asia, South Asia and Southeast Asia ====
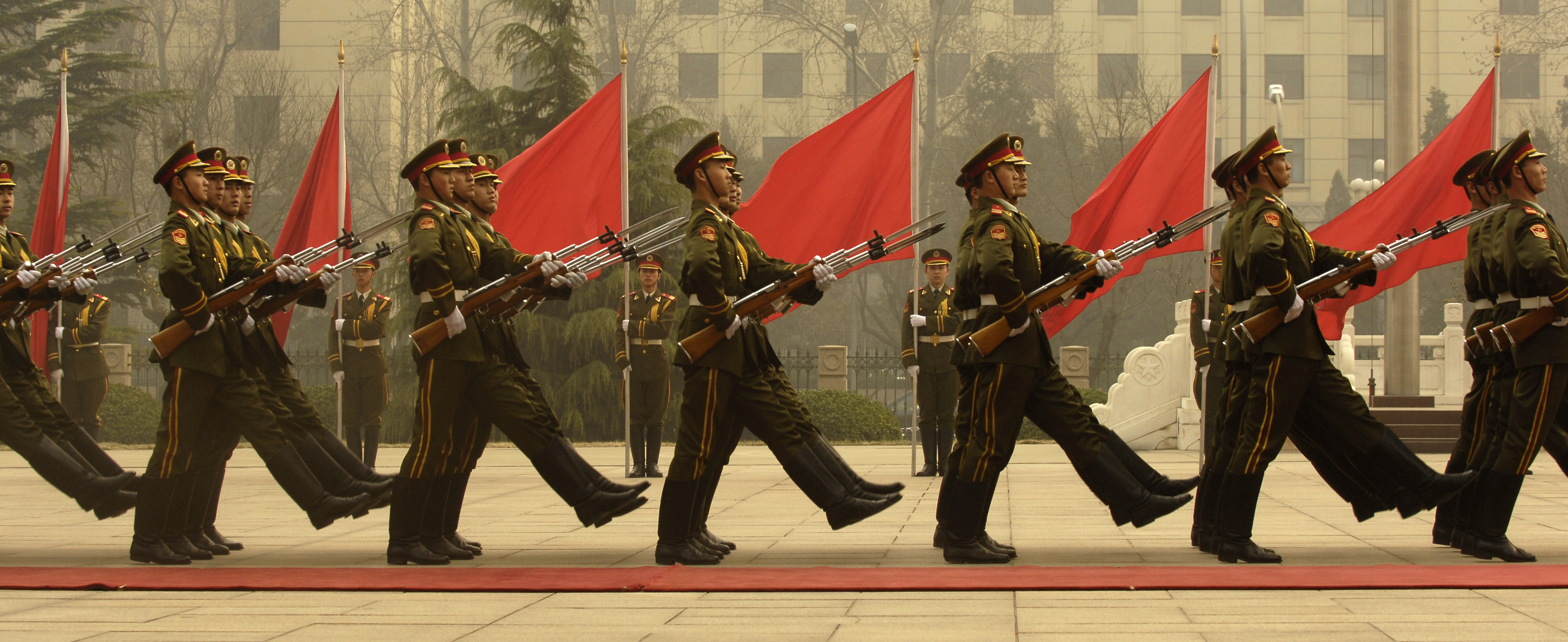
A Chinese People's Liberation Army honor guard company goose-steps

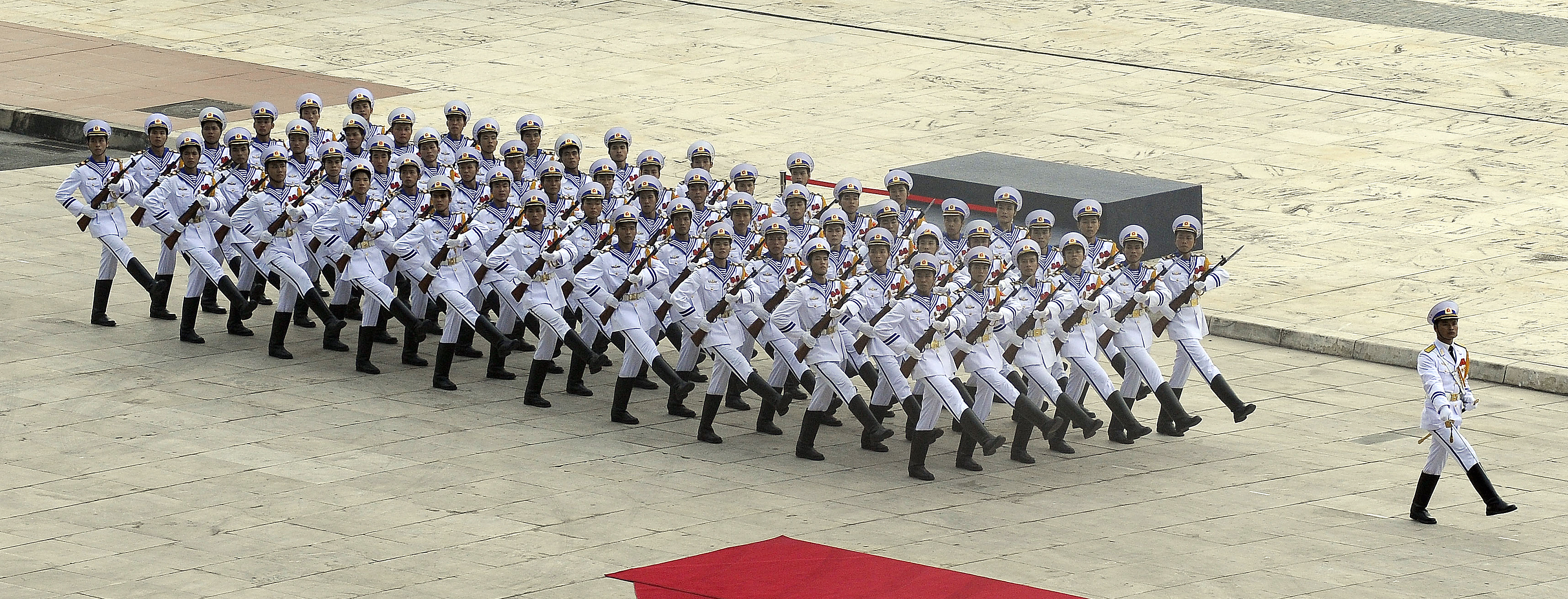
The Vietnam People's Navy honor guard company goose-stepping at ASEAN defense ministers meeting, 2010

- Bangladesh
- Bhutan: Practices the goose step due to receiving training from Indian army instructors.
- Cambodia
- China: The Chinese term 正步 (zhèng bù) literally translates as "straight march" or "upright march". China adopted the goose step during the last days of the Qing dynasty, since the Beiyang New Army was modelled after the Prussian Army. After the 1911 revolution, the National Revolution Army of the Republic of China continued the practice due to tradition and also influence from German military advisors in the 1920s. After the Chinese Civil War, the People's Liberation Army of China again continued the practice due to both tradition and Soviet influences; it was seen publicly for the first time in 1951, when the second anniversary of the People's Republic of China was celebrated with a military parade in Beijing. The practice continued on both sides of the Taiwan Strait until 2003, when it was abandoned by the Republic of China Armed Forces. The People's Liberation Army continues to use the goose step as its ceremonial march step. In 2021, the ROC defense ministry has once again resumed goose step training, in time for the 2024 centennial celebration of the Republic of China Military Academy.
  - Hong Kong: Since the 1997 handover of sovereignty, some of Hong Kong's institutions who traditionally conduct the British-style drill, (Customs and Excise Department, etc.) have adopted the goose step. With the enaction of the Hong Kong National Security Law, the other disciplined services have also adopted the practice for relevant ceremonial purposes, such as the National Security Education Day. The Chinese central government has also requested uniformed youth groups in Hong Kong to adopt the goose step practice of the PLA in the mainland. As of January 2022, the Hong Kong Police Force has adopted the goose step method as a means of showing patriotism.
- India: The goose step is performed by colour guards, as well as border guards at the Wagah border ceremony. Some units, such as the Gurkha and Assam regiments, use the goose step as a general parade step, although the foot does not generally leave the ground for more than a couple of inches.

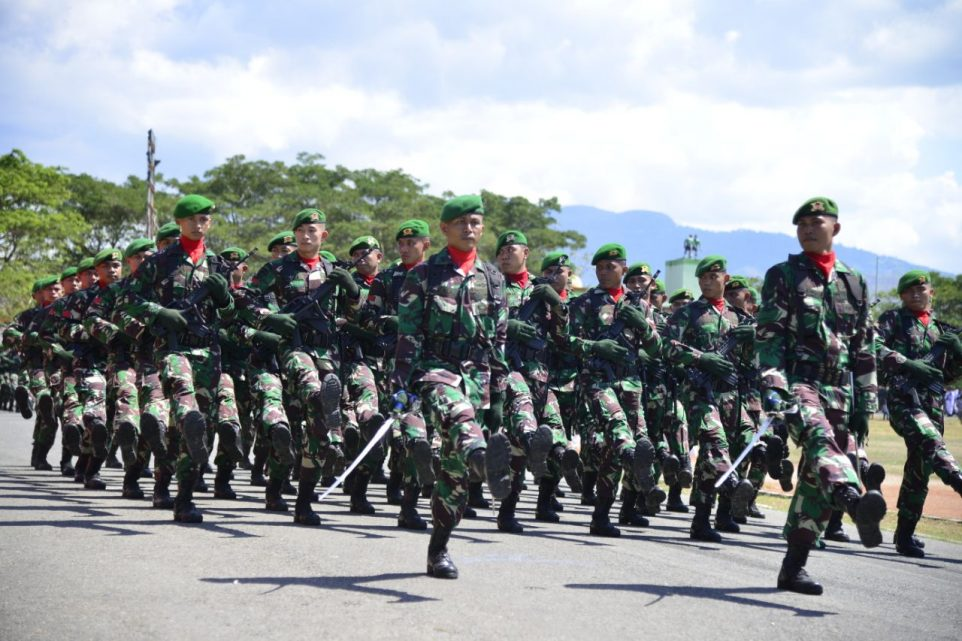
Indonesian Army marching on a parade. Difference of position can be seen between rifle-bearing soldiers and sword-bearing officers.

- Indonesia: The goose step, known as langkah tegap or firm step, is performed during ceremonial occasions by the military, police (although the foot does not generally leave the ground for more than a couple of inches unlike the military), scouts, and the flag troop. Appearing to be a kind of fusion with the British-style marching, the step is performed by swinging hands (at 90 degrees, or as high as the shoulder), either unarmed or at slope/shoulder arms position. If at port arms, both arms hold the weapon while performing it.
- North Korea: For many years, they practiced a form of bouncing goose step, which leaves a visual impression of a clear bounce in each step. This is unique among all militaries that practice the goose step. North Korea switched from a standard Soviet goose step to the bouncing goose step between 1993 and 1998, but a modified form resembling Soviet practice was reinstated in 2020 characteristic of a less vigorous bounce and a slower pace.
- Laos: The only known origin of the goose step in Laos dates back to after the country gained independence from France, when it adopted the goose step (its exact origin is unknown). After the Laotian Civil War and the communist victory, Laos adopted a Chinese marching style. The differences from the Soviet style can be seen in the Lao military's 70th anniversary parade in 2019, particularly in the hand posture, leg movement, and troop formations.
- Mongolia
- Nepal: Uses the goose step as a general parade step, but lifting the feet only a couple of inches above the ground; only honor guards have been observed to march with a "full" goose step. The practice has also been adopted by Gurkha regiments in the Indian Army, but not by Gurkha regiments in the British Army.
- Pakistan: Uses the goose step as a military march step in slow time only. The marching pace while goose stepping is 60 bpm.
- Taiwan: Similar to mainland China, the Republic of China Armed Forces in Taiwan performed the goose step because the Beiyang New Army was modelled after the Prussian Army. This was abandoned by the Republic of China Armed Forces in 2003, under Chen Shui-Bian's DPP government. In 2021, the ROC defense ministry once again resumed goose step training, in time for the 2024 centennial celebration of the Republic of China Military Academy. In 2023, goose step marching was performed by the Republic of China Armed Forces for the first time in 20 years for the 99th anniversary of Whampoa Military Academy.
- Thailand: Thailand has performed the goose step since the reign of King Rama V, as part of the modernization of the army influenced by the Prussian military style. The marching style has changed in each era. Before World War II, the goose step was performed only by the Royal Guards. Around the 1920s, it became the standard marching step for the military. The height of the step has also varied over time. During the Royal Thai Armed Forces Day in 2014, the step was as high as a person's waist. However, after King Rama X introduced new regulations on military traditions, the step must not be higher than the belt, and the marching pace has been slowed down.
- Vietnam

=== Evolution ===
The goose step is a ceremonial march that requires substantial training. It is often abandoned in times of war, as more pressing needs occupy the available training time. Opinion on the goose step was divided even in the German Wehrmacht in the 1930s. During the later stages of World War II, the goose step nearly disappeared because of manpower shortages, accelerated courses in basic training, and a paucity of appropriate occasions.

After the Second World War, West Germany abandoned the goose step in favor of "marching step" (Gleichschritt), due to their status as light infantry. East Germany preserved the goose step and renamed it the "drilling step" (Exerzierschritt) to avoid references to old Prussian and Wehrmacht military traditions. The 200-year-old German tradition of goose stepping finally ended with German reunification in 1990, as East German forces were absorbed into the Bundeswehr and conformed to West German military customs. Although goose-stepping is not officially approved, the practice is not illegal in Germany. Some civilian marching bands and riflemen's associations continue to goose-step while others dropped it altogether.

Estonia, Latvia, Lithuania and Georgia abandoned the Russian-style goose step after the fall of the Soviet Union. By 2015, Estonia revived the practice, but only color guards do so on parades. Latvia retained the goose step for ceremonial purposes. The other 11 former Soviet Republics have kept the goose step (only Moldova's military honor guard unit retains the practice). The breakaway Russian-occupied regions in Georgia, Moldova and Ukraine continue to use the goose step.

Ethiopia adopted the goose step during the Derg military junta, which espoused socialist ideals and sought Soviet military aid. The practice was dropped after the Derg were overthrown but was restored – with a modified British arms and parade drill – in 2023.

Hungary used the high step during the regency of Miklós Horthy, and switched to the goose step early in the Cold War. Neither march step was retained after the end of the Cold War, as the parade of 1961 formally ended its use in favor of the normal quick march. (It was only retained as a slow march for the entrance of historical colors, until 1990 a modified high step was used by guards of honour.)

Italy introduced the goose step in 1938 under Benito Mussolini as the Passo Romano ("Roman Step"). The custom was never popular in Italy's armed forces except amongst the Blackshirts. The goose step was dropped after World War II.

Romania used the goose step from the 1910s up until 2004, when the Romanian Armed Forces ended using it for formal parades. Today, only historical units dressed in uniforms from the First World War perform the goose step, but in shoulder arms position on the march instead of the usual slope arms done until the 2000s, by then only by guards of honor.

Switzerland is a majority German-speaking country that absorbed many German (and certain Austrian) military traditions alongside those of France and Italy as a reflection of the country's diversity. The Swiss Armed Forces abandoned the goose step in 1946, after the German defeat in World War II.

The goose step was also being practiced in the neighbor countries of Germany like Netherlands, Belgium, Denmark and Luxembourg in tandem with other influences (particularly British, French and Germans), but following the Second World War, these countries dropped it altogether.

The Malaysian Armed Forces (ATM), in 2018, once practiced the goose step as their new type of marching step combined with British style marching for ceremonial purpose, but was abandoned later after receiving several criticism from Malaysian citizens.

The Republic of China (Taiwan) Armed Forces continued to use the goose step after the end of the Chinese Civil War. The 80-year tradition of goose-stepping was finally ended in 2003, during an independence-minded Democratic Progressive Party administration. In 2016, veterans organizations criticized the sloppy marching of military cadets and began holding their own goose-stepping parades, reviewed by Kuomintang politicians on two occasions. In 2021, the Taiwanese department of defense resumed goose step training, in time for the 2024 centennial celebration of the Republic of China Military Academy. In 2023, the goose step was once again publicly performed at the 99th Anniversary of the Republic of China Military Academy.

Zimbabwean guerillas used the goose step during the Rhodesian Bush War of the 1970s. ZIPRA was trained and supplied by the Warsaw Pact, adopting East German uniforms and the goose step. Meanwhile, ZANLA was supplied and trained by China in Maoist guerilla tactics. However, Zimbabwe ultimately attained Black majority rule thanks to British influence. As a result, the unified Zimbabwean Army maintained a British march step.

== High step ==
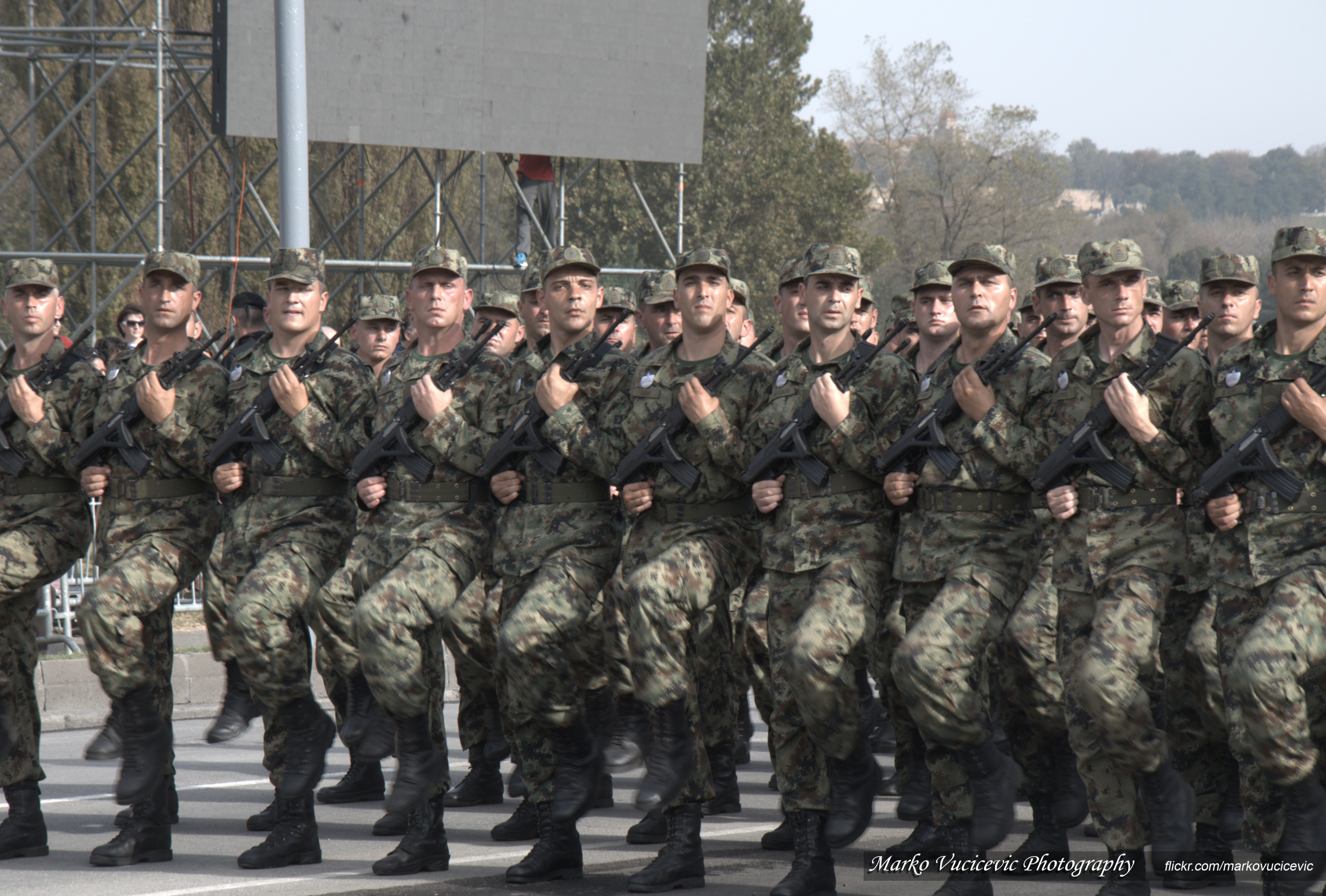
Example of high-stepping in a military parade, Belgrade

The high step is similar to the goose step, but instead of keeping the leg straight, the knee is bent at the top of the arc. It has been used by a number of military forces, often as an alternative to or replacement for the goose step.

- Argentina: the high step is standard among the Argentine Navy and Air Force, and has been increasingly adopted by units of the Army and Naval Prefecture which had previously used the goose step.
- Brazil
- Czech Republic
- East Timor
- Hungary: the high step was used during the Interwar Period but abandoned in favor of the goose step after World War II.
- Iran: the Islamic Revolutionary Guard Corps uses the high step while the rest of the military uses the goose step.
- Japan: the Japanese military was modernized along German lines during the Meiji era and adopted the high step during this time. The step was abandoned after the country's defeat in World War II. Some units, such as the Northern Army units of the JGSDF, firefighting units, and police forces, still maintain the practice.
- Lebanon
- Philippines: the high step been practiced by military juniors or cadets for training purpose only. It has not been used in military parade, honor guard or official ceremony, however.
- Portugal
- Syria: the Syrian Armed Forces use the goose step, but Kurdish forces in the Syrian Civil War adopted the high step.
- Somalia
- Somaliland
- Turkey
- Uruguay
- Yugoslavia: the high step was adopted by the Royal Yugoslav Army, abandoned in favor of the goose step by the Yugoslav People's Army after World War II, but reinstated when the country sought to disassociate itself from the Soviet Union as a result of the Tito–Stalin split. The former Yugoslav republics of Serbia, North Macedonia, Slovenia, and Bosnia and Herzegovina (except for Croatia) continue to use it to this day.

== In popular culture and propaganda ==
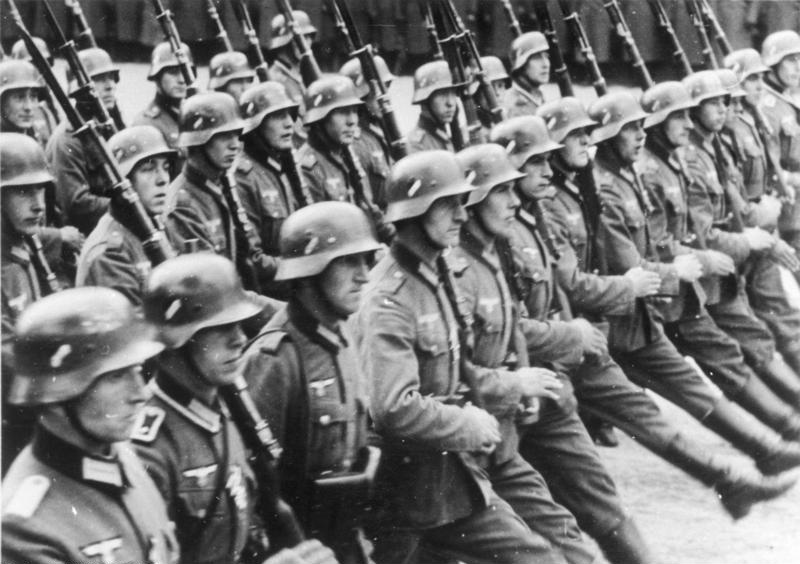
Wehrmacht troops parading in Warsaw on 5 October 1939

The goose step was ridiculed by Western Allied propaganda in the World Wars as a symbol of blind obedience and senseless attachment to military form. Prior to U.S. entry into World War I, American military observers had remarked favorably on the goose step as a means of building unit cohesion. However, its association with Nazi Germany in World War II proved fatal to the goose step's reputation in English-speaking countries. It was condemned in George Orwell's essay The Lion and the Unicorn, and proved an easy target for parody in many editorial cartoons and Hollywood films.

Orwell commented in "England Your England" (1941) that the goose step was used only in countries where the population was too scared to laugh at their military.

=== Cultural references ===
- In "The Germans", an episode of the British sitcom Fawlty Towers first broadcast in 1975, the main character Basil Fawlty imitates the goose step in front of some German hotel guests.
- In Disney's The Lion King (1994), the hyenas marching through Scar's Be Prepared song perform the goose step to symbolize the dictatorship that will be imposed after Mufasa is overthrown.
- In a 1999 television adaptation of Orwell's Animal Farm, the goose step is performed by a flock of geese, singing the praises of their porcine leader Napoleon in a propaganda film.
- In Indiana Jones and the Last Crusade, Professor Henry Jones, Sr., defiantly calls an interrogating Nazi officer and his cohorts "goose-stepping morons" and suggests they "try reading books instead of burning them".

In colloquial English, the phrase goose-stepping has connotations of blind obedience and submission. The term does not carry this negative connotation in countries that currently use the goose step, though this is sometimes the actual case. This can result in mistaken interpretations due to cultural differences:

- In Spartacus, a ballet by Aram Khachaturian, the Roman soldiers goose-step in most of their scenes. English-speaking reviewers sometimes conclude erroneously that the choreography must be intending to link the Roman Empire with the tyranny of Nazi Germany. However, goose-stepping in Russia carries no such connotation, and reflects only military discipline. Goose-stepping can be found in a number of Russian ballets in which it is not associated with the villains.

The older English meaning of goose-step is sometimes found in a humorous context:

- In The Tale of Tom Kitten, a children's book by Beatrix Potter, the three puddle-ducks are described as "marching one behind the other and doing the goose step".

== See also ==
- Lockstep marching
- Military step
