= Military step =

Regular, ordered and synchronized walking of military formations

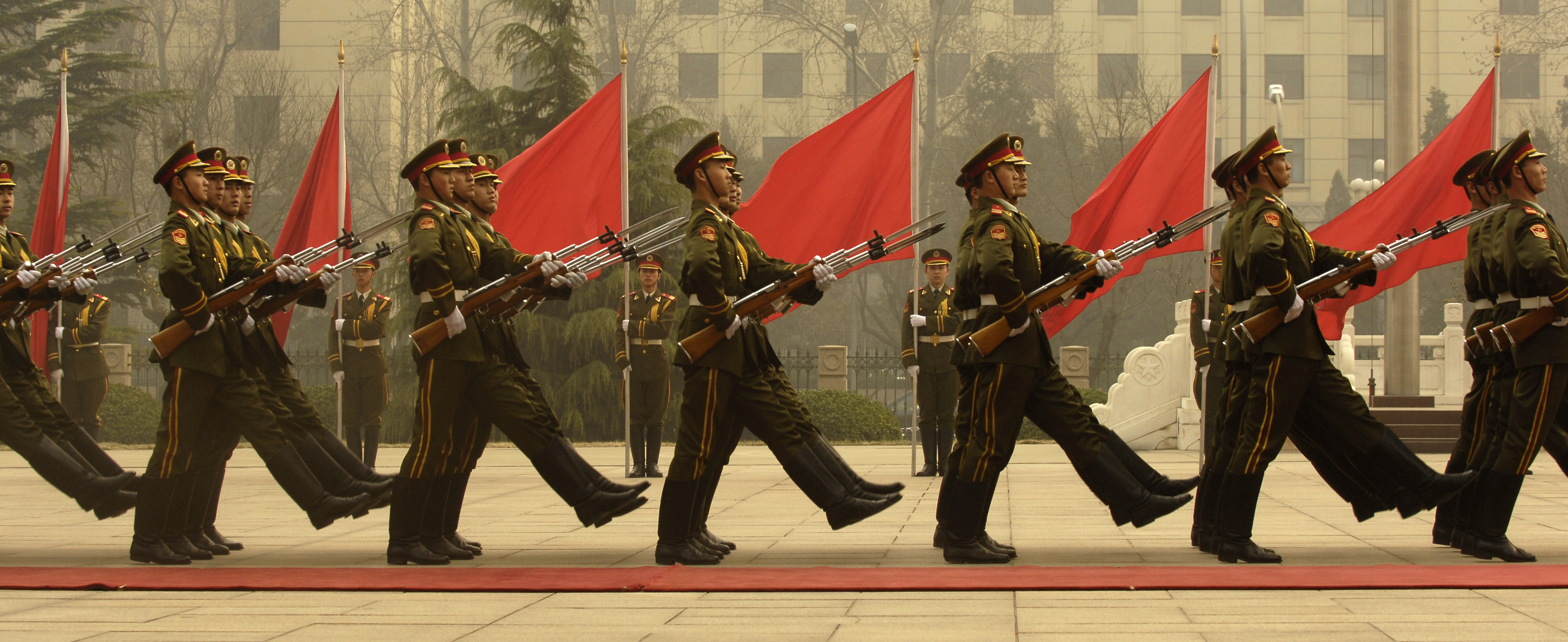
A Chinese PLA honor guard company goosesteps at quick march.

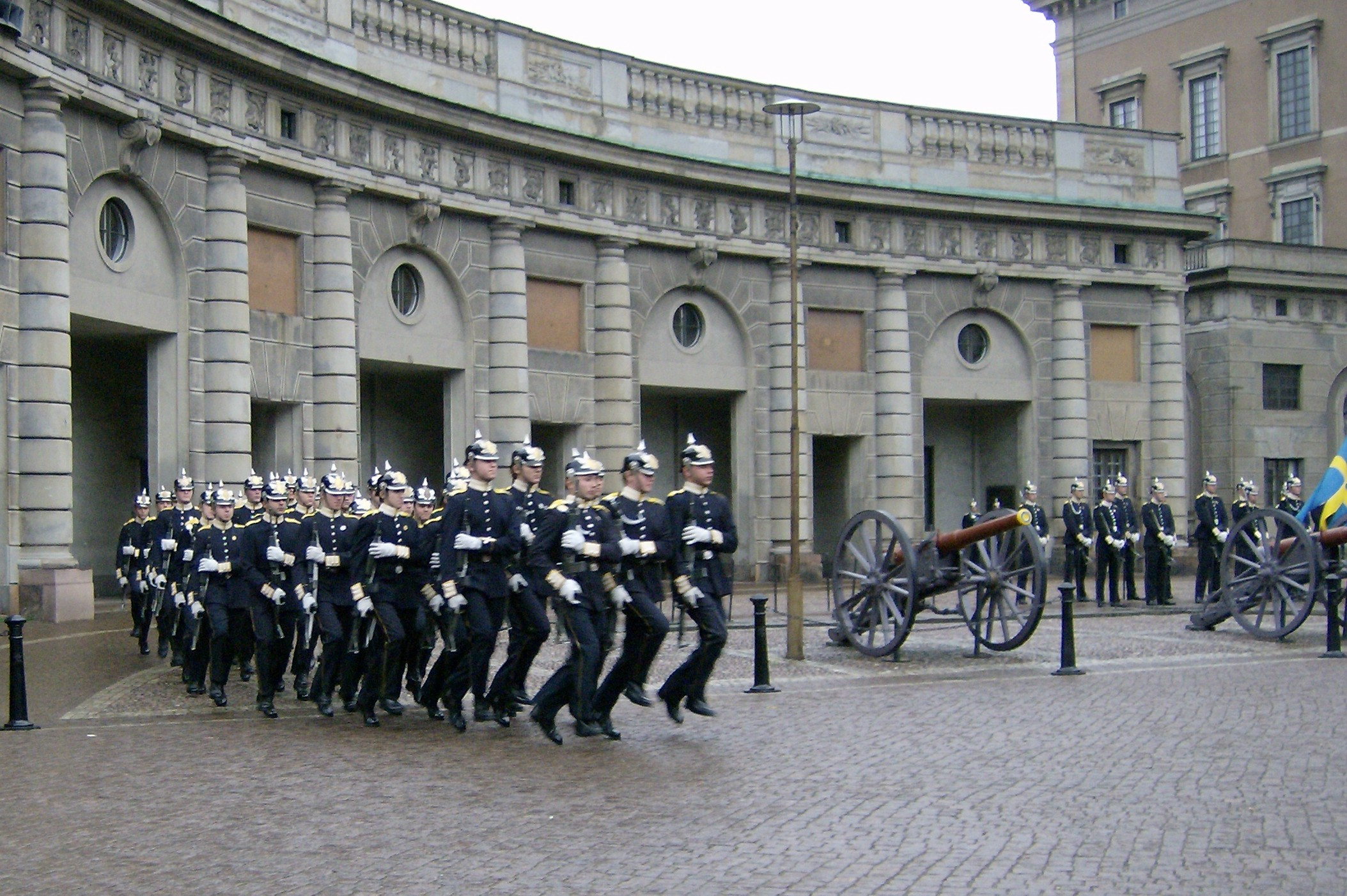
Stockholm Palace guards double time marching

Military step or march is a regular, ordered and synchronized walking of military formations.

== History ==
The steady, regular marching step was a marked feature of Roman legions. Vegetius, the author of the only surviving treatise on the Roman Empire's military, De Re Militari, recognized the importance of:

constant practice of marching quick and together. Nor is anything of more consequence either on the march or in the line than that they should keep their ranks with the greatest exactness. For troops who march in an irregular and disorderly manner are always in great danger of being defeated. They should march with the common military step twenty miles in five summer-hours, and with the full step, which is quicker, twenty-four miles in the same number of hours. If they exceed this pace, they no longer march but run, and no certain rate can be assigned.

Military marching of foot formations into a battle was a common practice in most European countries for centuries, and was even carried over into the new world as recently as the American War of Independence. Since then, it has been phased out by advances in military equipment and tactics; however, foot drill remains an important part of military education and training.

== Marching types and commands ==
North Korean female soldiers goose-stepping through Kim Il Sung Square.

The following commands specify different types of marching:

- Quick March: This is an instruction to begin marching at the Quick March speed with the left foot. The standard pace is 116 beats per minute with a 30-inch (76 cm) step, with variations for individual regiments, the pace given by the commander, and the speed of the band's rhythm: British light infantry and rifle regiments, for example, Quick March at 140 beats per minute, a legacy of their original role as highly mobile skirmishers. Highland regiments, which march to bagpipe music, march at 112 paces per minute when with pipe bands solely, while on 120 when with military bands.
  - Australian Army Quick Time is 116 paces per minute with a 76 cm (2 ft 6 in) pace
  - Canadian Armed Forces Quick Time is 120 paces per minute with a 76 cm pace except for:
    - foot guards regiments whose pace is 116 per minute;
    - Scottish/Highland regiments whose pace is 110 per minute; and
    - light infantry (less Princess Patricia’s Canadian Light Infantry, which drills as a line regiment) and rifle regiments, which have traditions of maintaining special agility and alertness on the battlefield, 140 paces per minute.
  - United States Quick Time is 120 paces per minute
  - New Zealand Army Quick Time is 120 paces per minute with a 76 cm pace

The way a unit marches is based upon the unit's nationality, role and history. Most Western Bloc nations currently have similar quick marching styles of lifting their legs in a natural or casual manner. Former Eastern Bloc nations and several Latin American, Asian and African nations use or have used the goose step, with legs remaining straight during each step. Both of these function to maintain individual pace, unit pace uniformity, and actually help the soldiers march in their relatively elevated pace.

The United States march command is "For-ward, MARCH," or "quick time, MARCH" when resuming quick time from another pace or from "route step". Arm movement is kept to 9 inches to the front and 6 inches to the rear (6 inches and 3 inches, respectively, in the U.S. Navy, Coast Guard, Marine Corps, and Air Force) while marching, while the interval between ranks and files is both 40 inches. The light infantry version of the march is also used by the Spanish Legion during parades, as well as the Chasseurs of the French Army (Chasseurs alpins inclusive).

- Slow March: This is a ceremonial pace used for funeral marches and when a unit's colours are marched out in front of the troops. The feet are kept close to the ground and the arms are generally not swung. In the United States Army and Marine Corps, arms are swung the distance they normally would in quick time, but at the same pace as marching. U.S. Marine Color Guards do not swing their arms. Slow March is typically used in the Marine Corps for funeral details and ceremonies such as the Marine Corps Ball (when the cake is escorted out). In Spain, Latin America, and the Philippines this is done during religious processions whenever a military band joins it. This march style is the official parade march in the armed forces of Bolivia and Ecuador and the military academies and schools of Venezuela, done with the goose step during parades and ceremonies. The standard pace is 60 paces per minute (88 for the FFL).
  - Australian Army Slow Time is 70 paces per minute with a 75 cm pace.
  - British armed services Slow March is 65 paces per minute.
- Half Step March or Cut the pace: This is a US march pace. It is at the same tempo as Quick Time, but instead of 30 inches, the step is 15 inches.
- Double March: This is essentially a moderate jog at approximately 180 36 inch paces (British armed services: 40 inch) per minute. It creates a travel speed of approximately double that of Quick Time, designed to be used even when carrying heavy burdens. This is often erroneously used to describe a sprint or an ordinary run. The U.S. command is "Double Time, MARCH." This is also used by the elite airborne units and special forces of the National Armed Forces of Venezuela as well as in the Armed Forces of Bolivia, soldiers of the Italian Army's Bersaglieri, and historically, Iraqi special forces units and the current Iraqi Special Operations Forces during parades and ceremonies.
- Easy March: This is an unrestricted march at approximately Quick Time. This is designed for field marches and other rough conditions, though is not used in combat areas. The U.S. command is "Route-step, MARCH."
- Mark Time: The military mark time is essentially a stationary march with the knees coming up parallel to the ground or the foot dangling six inches off the ground. The time of what they were previously marching is kept or Quick March is used if no time is supplied. This is designed to maintain the time of large parades when portions need no forward speed, but is also used as a common punishment for physical training because of its tiring nature. United States service members move the knees upward approximately 6 inches.
- Step Forward or Forward or Forward, March: This causes troops marking time to resume a normal march. If it is implicitly used (as when the marking time is used to align formations or to wait for the former rank to pass when entering "Column of Route" from a depth-style formation) the (typically) Right Marker stomps his foot to signal it to the rest of the troops.

== See also ==
- Military parade
- Marching
- Marching band
- Lockstep
- Drill commands
