= England Your England =

Essay by George Orwell

"England Your England" is an essay written by the English author George Orwell during The Blitz of 1941 as bombers of Nazi Germany flew overhead. It was his attempt to define English culture and the English people for the rest of the world as he feared that it might soon be wiped out by the Nazis. In the essay he also wrote that England would not change into a fascist state and could not unless she was thoroughly broken.

The essay was the first part of The Lion and the Unicorn: Socialism and the English Genius, published 19 January 1941, as the first volume of a series edited by T. R. Fyvel and Orwell, in the Searchlight Books published by Secker & Warburg.

Orwell described England as one of the most democratic nations of the time, but also stated that it lacked a true worldview and had replaced it with a level of fervent patriotism. He supported this argument with reference to the fact that English gentry and businessmen thought Fascism was a system that was compatible with the English economy. The gentry believed that simply because Benito Mussolini and Adolf Hitler were staunchly opposed to communism that their views were "England-friendly" and thus they cheered whenever Mussolini's bombers sank a ship ferrying supplies to support Spanish republicans. It was not until the election came around that they realised that Franco's victory would be a severe blow to England. Thus they realised that Fascism is bad for England due to its revolutionary origins or heavily military-dependent system of policing and control. Orwell himself, however, admits that Fascism is a better system for the wealthy, unless you were a Jew, than Communism or democratic socialism.

Orwell argues that although Britain had many nationalities such as Scots, Welshmen, English, etc..., everyone considered themselves British as soon as a need to defend their land arose. He also theorized that it might be more appropriate to divide Britons by financial classes which would result in two, or maybe even three or four, Britains.

== Quotations ==
- "As I write, highly civilised human beings are flying overhead, trying to kill me."
- "They do not feel any enmity against me as an individual, nor I against them. They are 'only doing their duty', as the saying goes. Most of them would never dream of committing murder in private life. On the other hand, if one of them succeeds in blowing me to pieces with a well-placed bomb, he will never sleep any the worse for it. He is serving his country, which has the power to absolve him from evil."
- "One gets a better view of this question if one considers the minor point first. It is quite true that the so-called races of Britain feel themselves to be very different from one another. A Scotsman, for instance, does not thank you if you call him an Englishman. You can see the hesitation we feel on this point by the fact that we call our islands by no less than six different names, England, Britain, Great Britain, the British Isles, the United Kingdom and, in very exalted moments, Albion. Even the differences between north and south England loom large in our own eyes. But somehow these differences fade away the moment that any two Britons are confronted by a European. It is very rare to meet a foreigner, other than an American, who can distinguish between English and Scots or even English and Irish. To a Frenchman, the Breton and the Auvergnat seem very different beings, and the accent of Marseilles is a stock joke in Paris. Yet we speak of 'France' and 'the French', recognising France as an entity, a single civilisation, which in fact it is. So also with ourselves. Looked at from the outsider even the cockney and the Yorkshireman have a strong family resemblance."
- "And even the distinction between rich and poor dwindles somewhat when one regards the nation from the outside. There is no question about the inequality of wealth in England. It is grosser than in any European country, and you have only to look down the nearest street to see it. Economically, England is certainly two nations, if not three or four. But at the same time the vast majority of the people feel themselves to be a single nation and are conscious of resembling one another more than they resemble foreigners. Patriotism is usually stronger than class-hatred, and always stronger than any kind of internationalism. Except for a brief moment in 1920 (the 'Hands off Russia' movement) the British working class have never thought or acted internationally. For two and a half years they watched their comrades in Spain slowly strangled, and never aided them by even a single strike. But when their own country (the country of Lord Nuffield and Mr Montagu Norman) was in danger, their attitude was very different. At the moment when it seemed likely that England might be invaded, Anthony Eden appealed over the radio for Local Defence Volunteers. He got a quarter of a million men in the first twenty-four hours, and another million in the subsequent month. One has only to compare these figures with, for instance, the number of conscientious objectors to see how vast is the strength of traditional loyalties compared with new ones."
- "The intellectuals who hope to see it Russianised or Germanised will be disappointed. The gentleness, the hypocrisy, the thoughtlessness, the reverence for law and the hatred of uniforms will remain, along with the suet puddings and the misty skies. It needs some very great disaster, such as prolonged subjugation by a foreign enemy, to destroy a national culture. The Stock Exchange will be pulled down, the horse plough will give way to the tractor, the country houses will be turned into children's holiday camps, the Eton and Harrow match will be forgotten, but England will still be England, (Note: The song There'll Always Be an England was highly popular at the time when the essay was written, and Orwell is likely to have heard it.) an everlasting animal stretching into the future and the past, and, like all living things, having the power to change out of recognition and yet remain the same."
- "In intention, at any rate, the English intelligentsia are Europeanized. They take their cookery from Paris and their opinions from Moscow. In the general patriotism of the country they form a sort of island of dissident thought. England is perhaps the only great country whose intellectuals are ashamed of their own nationality. In left-wing circles it is always felt that there is something slightly disgraceful in being an Englishman and that it is a duty to snigger at every English institution, from horse racing to suet puddings. It is a strange fact, but it is unquestionably true that almost any English intellectual would feel more ashamed of standing to attention during 'God Save the King' than of stealing from a poor box."
- "The British ruling class were not altogether wrong in thinking that Fascism was on their side. It is a fact that any rich man, unless he is a Jew, has less to fear from Fascism than from either Communism or democratic Socialism. One ought never to forget this, for nearly the whole of German and Italian propaganda is designed to cover it up."

== See also ==
- Bibliography of George Orwell
