= Bedlington Academy =

Secondary school in Northumberland, England

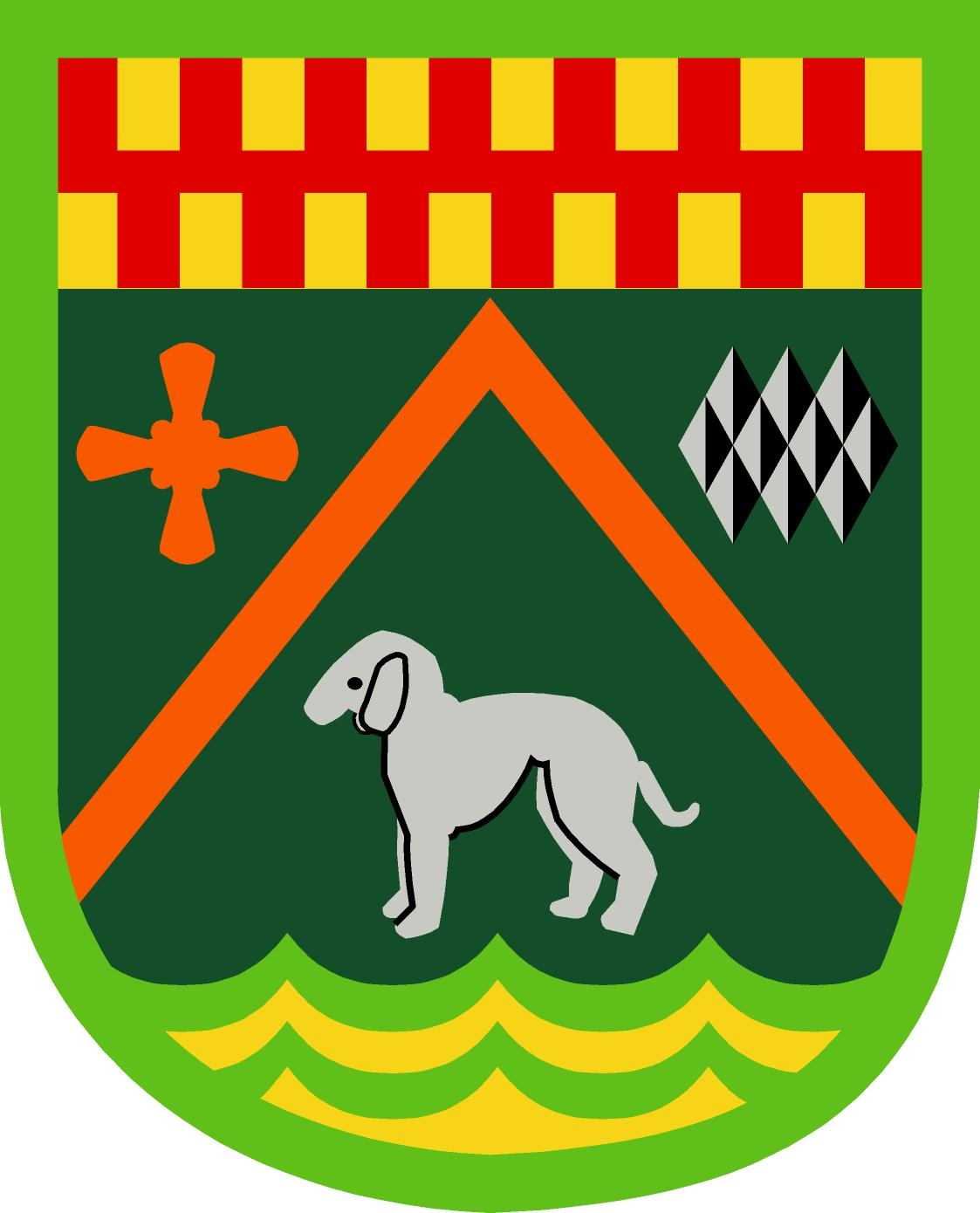

Location
- Palace Road; Bedlington, Northumberland, NE22 7DS; England; 55.1365°N 1.5638°W

Information
- Type: Academy
- Established: 1926
- Local authority: Northumberland
- Trust: North East Learning Trust
- Department for Education URN: 144977 Tables
- Ofsted: Reports
- Executive headteacher: Toni Spoors
- Headteacher: Joanna Lamb
- Gender: Coeducational
- Age: 11 to 19
- Enrolment: 859
- Alumni: Old Bedlingtonians
- Website: www.bedlingtonacademy.co.uk

Bedlington Academy (formerly Bedlingtonshire Community High School) is a coeducational secondary school and sixth form in Bedlington in the English county of Northumberland.

== History ==
It was founded in 1926 as Bedlington Secondary School for the areas of Bedlingtonshire, Ashington and Newbiggin, being built next to Bedlington railway station. Subsequently, it became Bedlington Grammar School, before turning comprehensive in 1974. It gained Maths and Computing College status in 2009. During April 2015 building work started on the new modern building. The old school shut its doors on 26 July 2016 to allow the demolition to commence. The new building opened, officially for students, on 6 September 2016. The school was converted to an academy, as part of the North East Learning Trust in early 2018.

== Admissions ==
The school is in Palace Road, just west of the junction of the A189 and A1147, and near the A189 bridge over the River Blyth. All secondary schools in Northumberland have a sixth form.

Admissions are in Years 7 and 9 - Year 7 students come from the five feeder primary schools, Bedlington Station Primary School, Stead Lane Primary School, Mowbray Primary School, Ringway Primary School, and Stakeford Primary School; whilst Year 9 students come from the three tier system from Meadowdale Academy.

== Notable former pupils ==
- Jayne Middlemiss.
- Kyle Cameron

=== Bedlington Grammar School ===
- Bobby Charlton
- John Hall, who built the MetroCentre
- Catherine Ann Lilburn, chairperson of the Women Against Pit Closures in 1984 during the miner's strike
