= Parkside =

Parkside may refer to:

== Australia ==
- Parkside, Queensland, a suburb in the City of Mount Isa
- Parkside, South Australia

== Canada ==
- Parkside, Saskatchewan, a village in the Canadian province of Saskatchewan

== New Zealand ==
- Parkside, New Zealand, a suburb of Timaru

== United Kingdom ==
- Parkside, Barrow-in-Furness, an area and ward in Cumbria
- Parkside, Cambridge, one of the streets that bounds Parker's Piece
- Parkside, an area of Cleland, North Lanarkshire
- Parkside, County Durham, a community
- Parkside, Hunslet, a former rugby league stadium in Hunslet, Leeds
- Parkside, Knightsbridge, a mansion block in Knightsbridge, London
- Parkside, Shotts, a football ground in Shotts

== United States ==
- Parkside, San Francisco, California, a neighborhood
- Parkside, Camden, New Jersey, a neighborhood
- Parkside, Trenton, New Jersey, a neighborhood
- Parkside, Pennsylvania, a borough in Delaware County, Pennsylvania, United States
- Parkside, Philadelphia, Pennsylvania, a neighborhood in the West Philadelphia area
- University of Wisconsin–Parkside, Kenosha, Wisconsin, or its athletic program, the Parkside Rangers

== Brand ==
- Parkside (tool brand), an own-brand owned by German discount retailer Lidl for its range of DIY tools

== See also ==
- Parkside Colliery, an old coal mine in Merseyside, England
- Parkside railway station (disambiguation)
- Parkside School (disambiguation)
  - Parkside Elementary School (disambiguation)
