= Parkside Elementary School =

Parkside Elementary School may refer to:

- Parkside Elementary School (Coral Springs, Florida)
- Parkside Elementary School (Columbus, Indiana)
- Parkside Elementary School (Morrisville, North Carolina)
- Parkside Elementary School (Blackwell, Oklahoma)
- Parkside Elementary School (Prince Edward Island)
- Parkside Elementary School (Murray, Utah)
- Parkside Elementary School (Spotsylvania, Virginia)

== See also ==
- Parkside School (disambiguation)
- Parkside (disambiguation)
