= Ann Lilburn =

British activist in the 1984-1985 miners strike (1939–2007)

- Born: 1939
- Died: 2007 (aged 67–68)
- Organization(s): Women Against Pit Closures (WAPC), Campaign For Coal

Ann Lilburn (née Musgrave, 1939–2007) was a British activist who became a leader in the Women Against Pit Closures movement during the 1984–85 coal miners' strike. She was national chair of the organisation.

The wife of Gordon Lilburn, and the mother of Billy and Alan Lilburn, all 3 striking miners, from Whittle Colliery in Northumberland. Her family had £6.45 to live on a week during the strike.

Ann became active in her local branch of Women Against Pit Closures (WAPC) and was elected chair of both the local branch and the national group. Before her involvement in WAPC, she had not spoken publicly.

A WAPC rally was held at Saltergate Football Stadium in Chesterfield for International Women's Day 1985, where Lilburn spoke alongside fellow activists Betty Heathfiled and Ann Scargill.

After the end of the strike, Lilburn joined the Campaign For Coal. She also continued to speak for working-class women, such as at the Women of the World conference in Athens, Greece. Greek newspapers called her "The housewife, Thatcher's nightmare".

Ann Lilburn died in 2007.
