= Parkside Middle School =

Parkside Middle School may refer to:

- Parkside Middle School, Bromsgrove, in Bromsgrove, England
- Parkside Middle School, Cramlington, England
