= Parkside School =

- Parkside Community School, Chesterfield, England
- Parkside Elementary, Indiana, USA
- Parkside Elementary School (disambiguation), various, USA
- Parkside High School, Maryland, USA
- Parkside High School, Dundas, Ontario, Canada
- Parkside Middle School, Cramlington, England
- Parkside Primary School, Adelaide, Australia

== See also ==
- Parkside Academy
- Parkside Collegiate Institute
- Parkside Community College
- Parkside Studio College
- University of Wisconsin–Parkside
- Parkside (disambiguation)
