= Parkside railway station =

Parkside railway station or Parkside station may refer to:

- Parkside railway station (Derbyshire), the station on the heritage Derbyshire Dales Narrow Gauge Railway in England
- Parkside railway station (Merseyside), an original station on the Liverpool and Manchester Railway in England
- Parkside Halt railway station, a former station in the Scottish Highlands, United Kingdom
- Parkside station, a former commuter railroad station in Long Island, New York
- Parkside Avenue (BMT Brighton Line), a subway station in Brooklyn, New York, United States
- Taraval and 28th Avenue station, a former streetcar stop in the Parkside neighborhood of San Francisco, California, United States

== See also ==
- Park station (disambiguation)
