= Taraval and 35th Avenue station =

Muni Metro light rail stop in San Francisco

Taraval and 35th Avenue
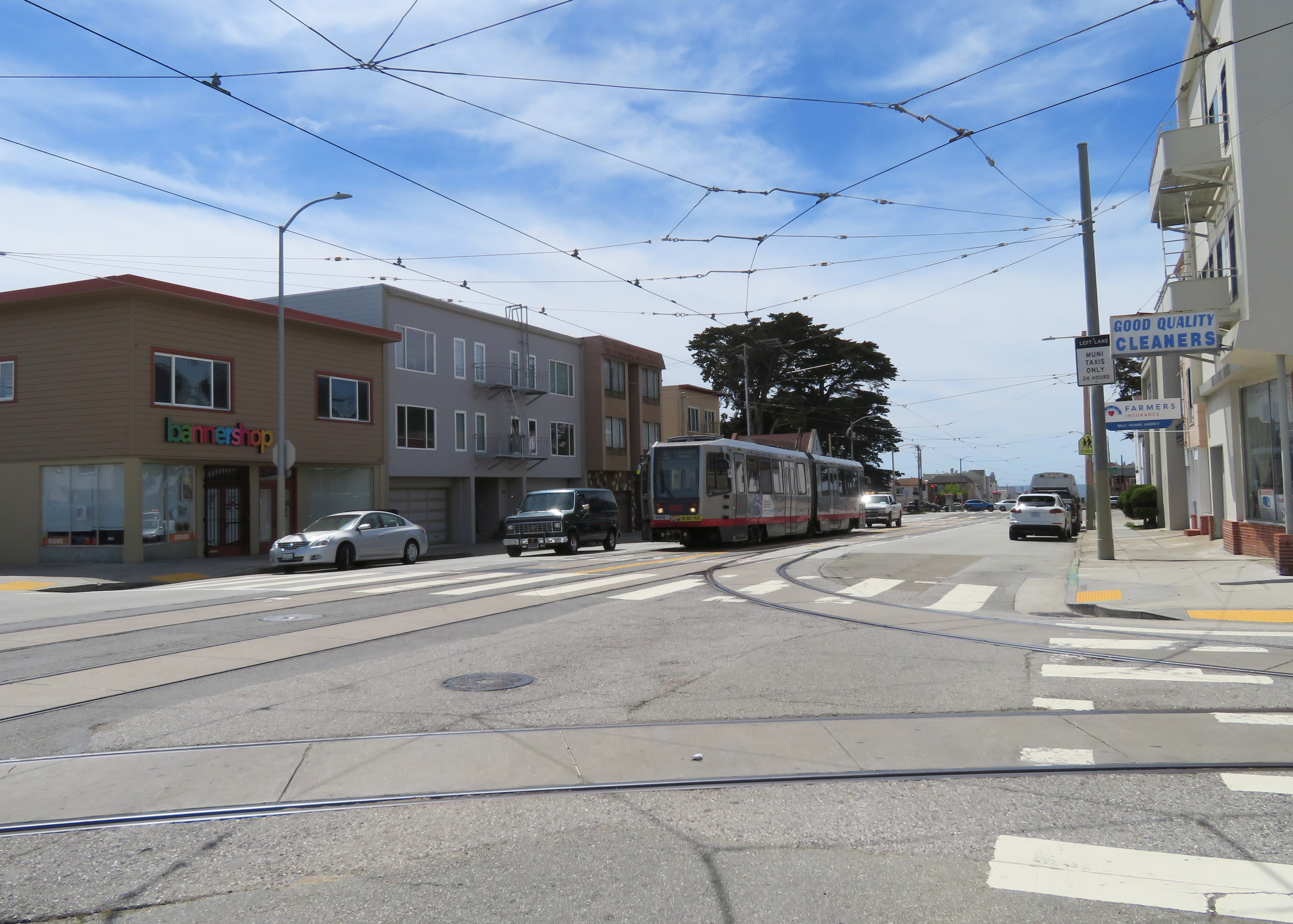
- An inbound train at the former stop in May 2018

General information
- Location: Taraval Street at 35th Avenue; San Francisco, California
- Coordinates: 37.74229°N 122.49282°W

History
- Opened: January 14, 1923
- Closed: February 25, 2017 (outbound); February 10, 2018 (inbound)

Former services
Preceding station	Muni	Following station
Taraval and Sunset toward SF Zoo	L Taraval	Taraval and 32nd Avenue toward Embarcadero
Location

Taraval and 35th Avenue was a light rail stop on the Muni Metro L Taraval line, located in the Parkside neighborhood of San Francisco, California. The stop opened with the second section of the L Taraval line on January 14, 1923; the outbound stop was closed in 2017, followed by the inbound stop in 2018. A crossover (used to short-turn trains) and a wye (used to store disabled trains) are present near the former stop.

== Closure ==
Like many stations on the line, Taraval and 35th Avenue has no platforms; trains stop at marked poles before the cross street, and passengers cross travel lanes to board. In March 2014, Muni released details of the proposed implementation of their Transit Effectiveness Project (later rebranded MuniForward), which included a variety of stop changes for the L Taraval line. The stop at 35th Avenue was one of several stops that would be eliminated to increase stop spacing and reduce travel time.

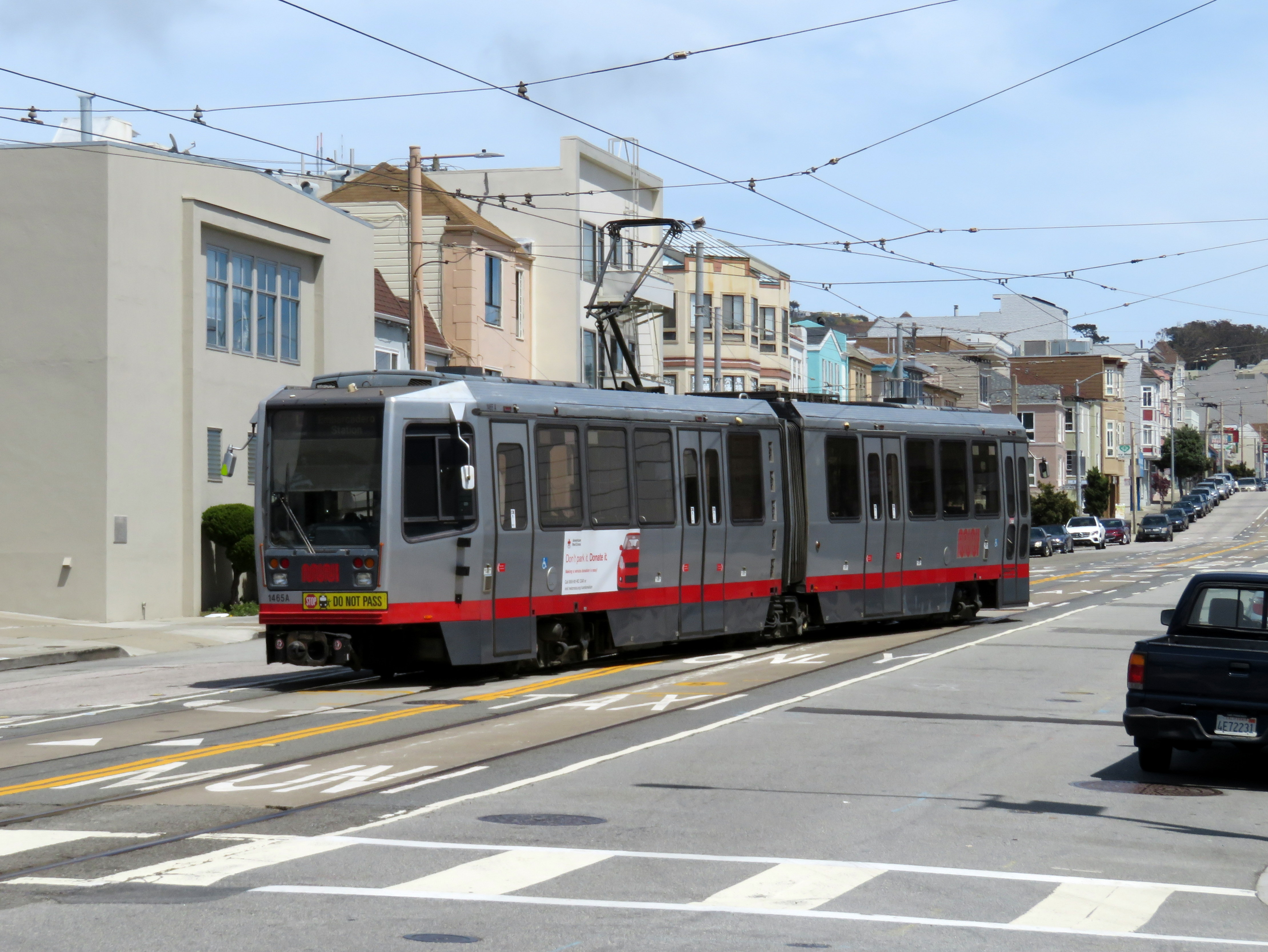
A train, short-turned at Taraval and Sunset, crossing over west of 35th Avenue. The presence of this crossover precluded the installation of a boarding island and forced the closure of the inbound stop.

On September 20, 2016, the SFMTA Board approved the L Taraval Rapid Project. Construction was to occur from 2018 to 2020. The board-approved version of the project kept the inbound stop at 35th Avenue. Early implementation of many changes, including elimination of the outbound atop at 35th Avenue, occurred on February 25, 2017.

In response to merchants complaining about the loss of parking spaces to allow for boarding islands, the Board agreed to an experimental pilot program on the inbound side at five stops: 26th, 30th, 32nd, 35th, and 40th Avenues. Painted stripes and signage were added to indicate that vehicles should stop behind trains to allow passengers to board and alight safely. If 90% of vehicles were observed to stop behind trains, Muni would not construct inbound boarding islands at the five locations. The six-month testing period ran from April 3, 2017 to October 2017. In November 2017, the SFMTA released the results of the study: only 74% of drivers stopped safely behind trains, and boarding islands would be built at all the stops.

However, Muni then proposed to remove the 35th Avenue stop because of its proximity to Taraval and Sunset, and because the adjacent crossover prevents the construction of boarding islands. In December 2017, the SFMTA Board voted to eliminate the remaining inbound stops at 17th Avenue (later reversed) and 35th Avenue. The inbound stop was closed on February 10, 2018.
