= Betty Heathfield =

English labour activist

Betty Heathfield (née Vardy, 30 March 1927 – 16 February 2006) was a leading figure in the miners' wives support and activist groups during the UK miners' strike of 1984–1985.

== Early life ==
Heathfield was born into a working-class mining family on 30 March 1927 in Chesterfield, Derbyshire. Both of her grandfathers had been miners and her father had mined before an injury sustained during World War I forced him to move into the gas industry.

She attended Chesterfield Girls' School. After leaving school, Heathfield worked as a secretary at an engineering company and became interested in left-wing politics. She became a member of the Young Communist League and was a founding member of the Derbyshire Women's Action Group.

== Activism ==
Heathfield was married to the National Union of Mineworkers (NUM) general secretary Peter Heathfield. Due to the 1984–1985 United Kingdom miners' strike, the miner's wives group Women Against Pit Closures (WAPC) was founded to coordinate women supporting the industrial dispute. It had some ties to the Communist Party of Great Britain (CPGB).

Heathfield was a central activist in WAPC, serving as chairwoman and a spokeswomen, picketing and leading the national campaign with Anne Scargill (the wife of President of the NUM Arthur Scargill) to help feed, clothe and motivate the striking mine workers. She spoke across the country, including at the Edinburgh Television Festival in 1984, telling the crowd how a rally of 10,000 miners wives in support of their husbands' strike action was largely ignored by the mainstream press.

After the strike was ended and union members voted to return to work, a national WAPC rally was held in Chesterfield on 9 March 1985. The event was to celebrate the end of the year long struggle. Heathfield was not originally due to be among the speakers, but it was felt that the speakers list (including Tony Benn, Chesterfield's MP and labour activist; Joan Ruddock, chair of the Campaign for Nuclear Disarmament (CND); Christine Drake, a Greenham Common Women's Peace Camp activist; and Ellen Musialela of the South West Africa People's Organization (SWAPO) and other international activists) was not representative of the movement and that miner's wives were being marginalised. After an intervention by Anne Scrargill and Ella Egan, Heathfield was invited to be one of the speakers. By this time, she had become known nationally as "the miners' heroine".

Heathfield continued to be influential in the wider labour movement, touring mining areas of the United States and Canada with Anne Scargill to ask for support for the depressed British mining communities. She attended Lancaster University, where she studied for a politics degree.

== Later life ==
Heathfield undertook an oral history project, collecting interviews of both women who had supported the miner's wives group and women who had been involved in Women's Cooperative Guild mutual aid society, to document these movements. Her papers are located at the Women's Library, London School of Economics, Ref #7BEH. This includes her 1985 unpublished book draft, Women of the Coalfields.

She became estranged from her husband Peter Heathfield.

She died on 16 February 2006, after suffering from Alzheimer's disease. Her funeral in Chesterfield was attended by family, friends and members of the labour movement, including Vic Allen, John Burrows, Dave Hopper, Arthur Scargill, Anne Scargill, Linda Skinner, and Tom Vallins. Tony Benn also paid his respects and delivered a eulogy. He recalled in his diaries that Mel Finch and a friend sang "Women of the Working Class" at the service.
