= Depth Charge (film) =

1960 British film by Jeremy Summers

- Directed by: Jeremy Summers
- Written by: Jeremy Summers; Kenneth Talbott
- Produced by: James Mellor; Kenneth Talbot
- Starring: Alex McCrindle; David Orr; Elliot Playfair
- Cinematography: Alan McCabe; Kenneth Talbot
- Music by: Stephen Dodgson
- Production company: President Pictures
- Distributed by: British Lion
- Release date: 1960
- Running time: 55 minutes
- Country: United Kingdom
- Language: English

Depth Charge is a 1960 British drama film directed by Jeremy Summers and starring Alex McCrindle, David Orr and Elliot Playfair. It was written by Summers and Kenneth Talbott, and was B Film shot partly on location in Berwickshire, and released by British Lion Films.

== Plot ==
A Scottish trawler lands an unexploded depth charge. The local lifeboat brings Bomb Squad officer Lieutenant Forrester on board. The crew is taken onto the lifeboat while deckhand Jamie stays to assist Forrester defuse the bomb. The sea is rough, and after Forrester successfully makes the bomb safe, Jamie is swept overboard.

== Cast ==
- Alex McCrindle as Skipper
- David Orr as Lt. Forrester
- Elliot Playfair as Jamie
- J. Mark Roberts as Bob
- Alex Allen as secretary

== Reception ==
The Monthly Film Bulletin wrote: This unpretentious but effective semi-documentary is based on fact, with natural and quite persuasive acting in keeping with the film's style. Some of the detail lacks the ring of conviction which is otherwise generally in evidence: the vessel's pitching is sometimes and conveniently forgotten during the dismantling scenes, which are overstrung here and there in an attempt to heighten suspense; also, and not for the first time, railway scenes result in faulty observation, But in the main Depth Charge is an agreeable pocket feature of an invigorating and much-needed kind. The photography, particularly in the introductory sequences, is notable."
