= Ida Hackett =

British communist and trade unionist

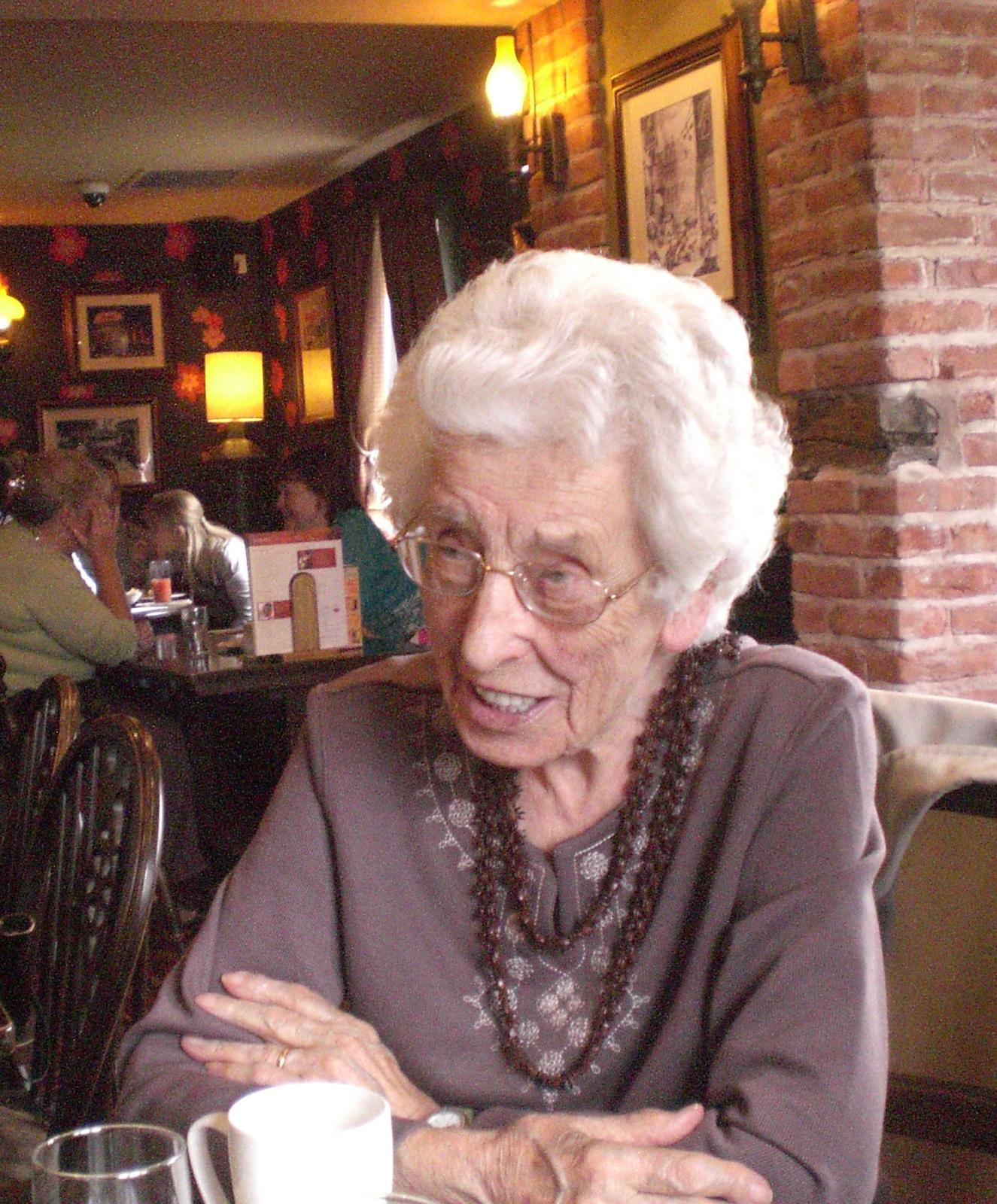
Photograph of Ida Hackett

Ida Hackett (1914–2012) was a communist, trade unionist and activist, who was involved in the political campaign Women Against Pit Closures.

== Early life ==
Hackett was born Ida Chrichlow in 1914 in Warsop, Nottinghamshire. Her father was a miner who was blacklisted for his views during the 1926 United Kingdom general strike, during which she helped him. After her father lost his job at Warsop Main Colliery, she became interested in activism.

== Career ==
Hackett began working at the Cooperative Society as a pot washer in 1931 and became an active trade unionist. By 1938, she had joined the Communist Party and had been elected to the Mansfield May Day committee. She became a member of the District Committee of the Communist Party in 1946 and was elected chair in 1952. Hackett was a member of the party's executive in the sixties and seventies. In 1961, Hackett stood for election as Councillor in Mansfield North Ward for the Communist Party, and was agent for Fred Westacott during three general elections in the 1960s. Westacott said he was “particularly fortunate” to have Ida as an Agent .....[she] did more work for the community than any councillor”, for example securing committee rooms from the council.

In 1953, as a Union of Shop, Distributive and Allied Workers unionist, Hackett visited the USSR with a delegation from the Communist Party, UK., organised by The National Assembly of Women in Britain, she was then a Nottingham Hosiery Worker. Hackett worked at a factory in Mansfield and two national union officials visited to persuade women in the hosiery industry to accept lower rates of pay than men and were dismissed from a meeting by Hackett. Delegates were impressed by the terrific drive in USSR for recovery after the war, people seemed happy under the communist system, but there were long queues in shops for items like televisions.

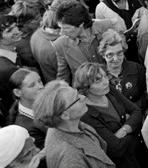
Ida Hackett (glasses, looking towards camera) at 1979 Anti Nazi league demonstration.

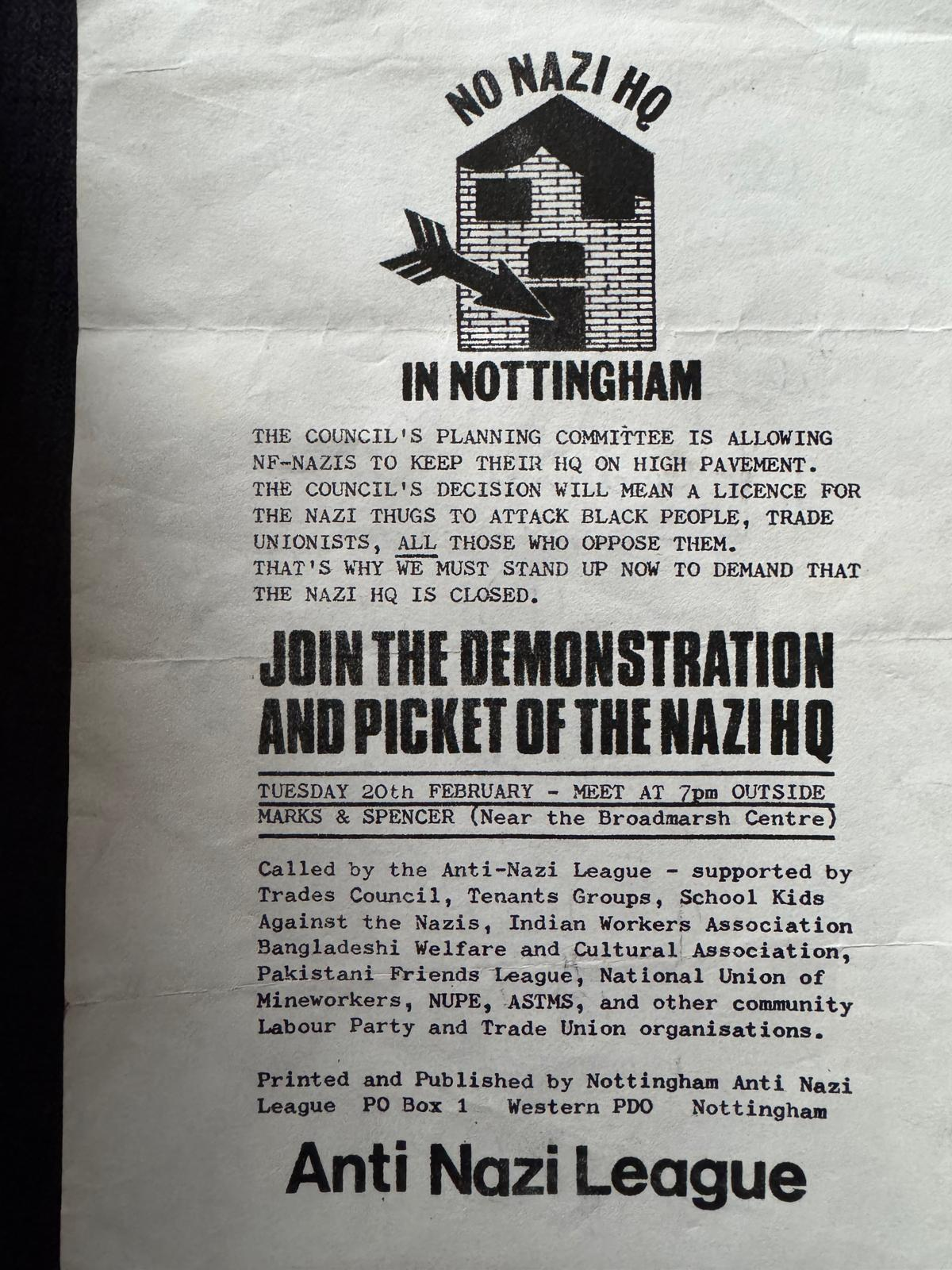
Leaflet - demonstration attended by Ida Hackett.

Hackett was secretary of the Mansfield town's Residents Association and Chair of the Tenants’ Association for Ladybrook and Mansfield. Hackett spoke as a member of the Mansfield Tenants Association in 1971 in Long Eaton, at a meeting which was organised by the communist party and the Trade Union Congress; on the subject of the government's proposals for Fair Deal for Housing. Hackett, as a member of the National Association of Tenants and Residents Executive Committee, spoke at a protest rally after a march in support of a rent strike by tenants at Victoria Park, Leicester against the Government's Housing Finance Bill. In 1979, Hackett attended an Anti Nazi League demonstration.

Hackett was Secretary of the East Midlands Pensioners Action group and Chair of the Mansfield Pensioners Action Association. Ahead of the general election in 1983, Hackett and the National Union of Mineworkers organised a party of North Nottingham pensioners to join 3000 from all over the country at a convention at Central Hall Westminster for a Declaration of Intent on a ten-point charter to make older people comfortable. Hackett was re-elected Chair of the Mansfield Pensioners action group in February, 1990 and lobbied for an increase in the £10 Christmas bonus. As secretary of the East Midlands Pensioners Action Group, Hackett called on the Chancellor, Gordon Brown, to link pensions to average earnings rather than inflation and to introduce concessionary TV licenses for all pensioners (not just those over 75) or cut standing charges on energy bills.

== Nottinghamshire Women Against Pit Closures ==
Hackett chaired the Nottinghamshire Women's Support Groups for families of striking miners (1984), coordinated weekly deliveries from London to Nottingham and spoke all over the country. She raised money via the Morning Star and art work was created by Ida Hackett and is on display at the Nottinghamshire Mining Museum. Hackett worked with support groups towards such events as 20,000 women and children attending the first Women Against Pit Closures national rally. Hackett was quoted as saying, “it was a new experience for men to see women working in this way, handling enormous amounts of money, speaking about the strike to huge audiences all over Britain and overseas. …..we were on the same side, weren’t we?”. After the strike ended, Hackett was a key figure in the campaign to reinstate 14 sacked miners and helped their families and later she campaigned for justice for pensioners.

== Personal life ==
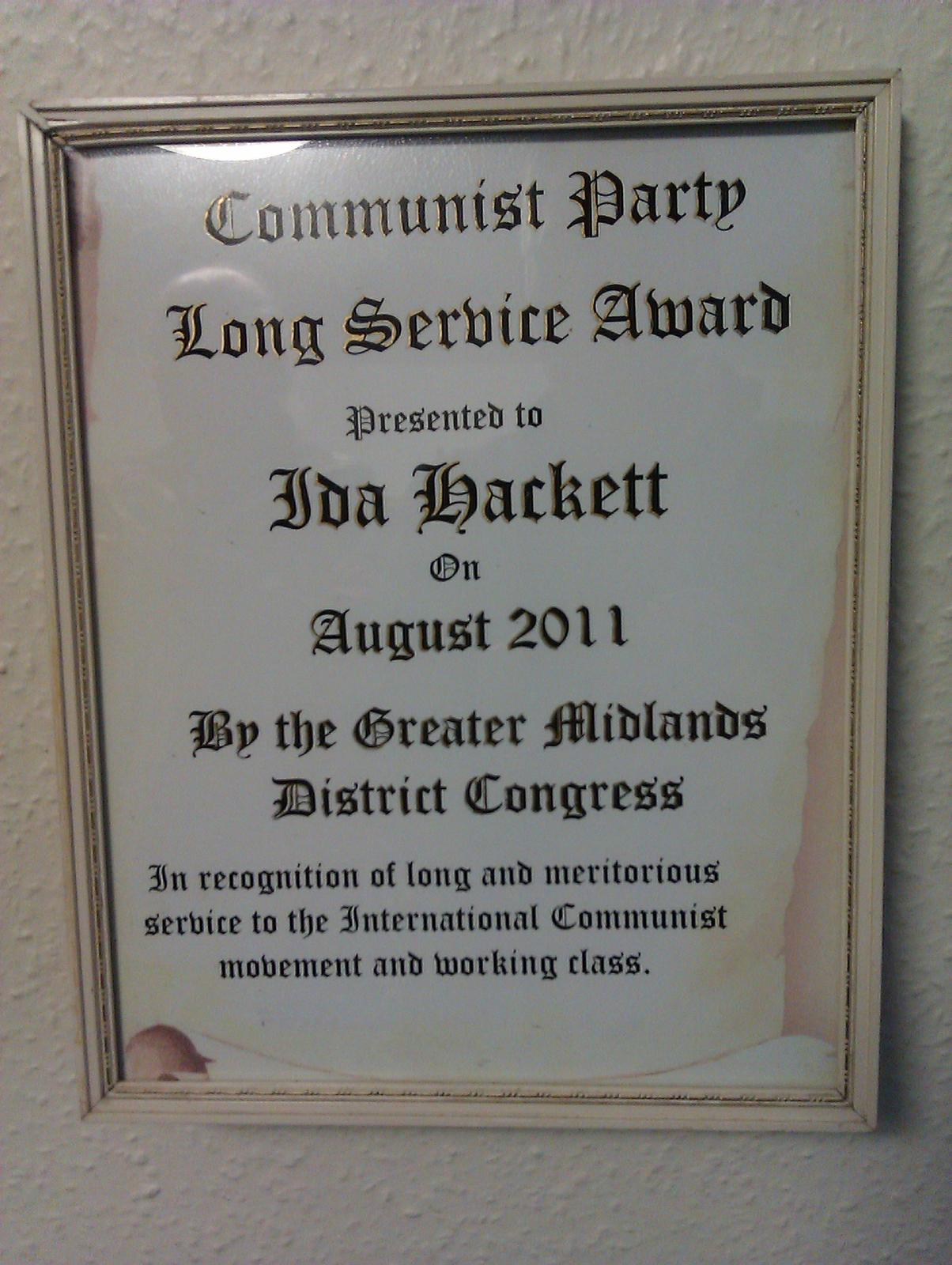
Ida Hackett long service award to the Communist Party

In 1939, she married Ernest Hackett and daughter (Ruth) was born in October 1940; she later became a nurse; son Ian was born 1955. Hackett was named as a “firebrand” July 1955, and her son, Ian, recalled his mother working as a cleaner for “professional people” like doctors. In 2011, Hackett was awarded a long service award by the Greater Midlands District Congress of the Communist Party. On the 23rd April 2012, Hackett died aged 98; a memorial meeting was held by trade unionists a few months later.
