= Taraval and 30th Avenue station =

Metro station in San Francisco

Taraval and 30th Avenue
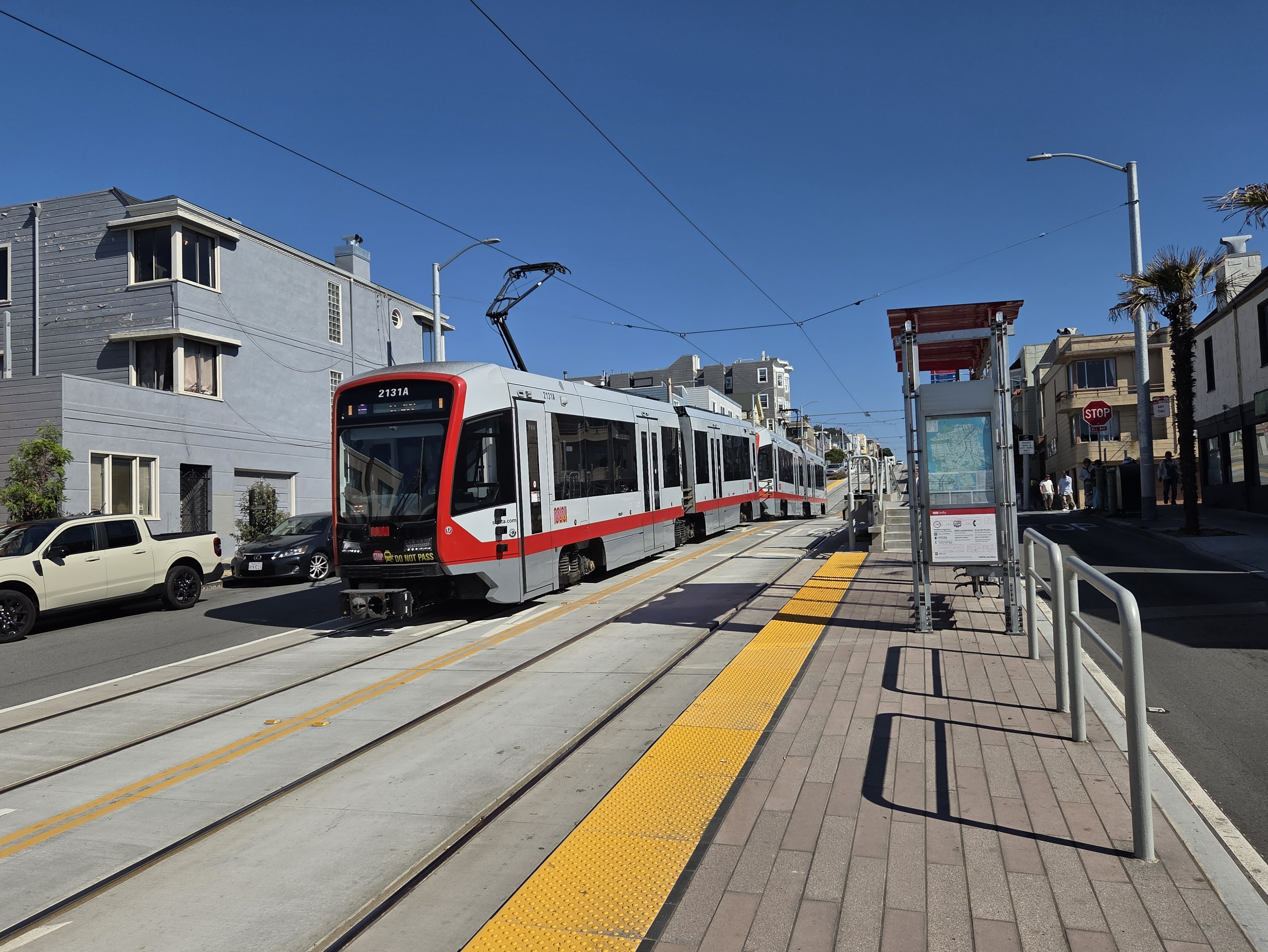
- An outbound train at Taraval and 30th Avenue in 2025

General information
- Location: Taraval Street at 30th and 28th Avenues; San Francisco, California
- Coordinates: 37.74253°N 122.48748°W
- Platforms: 2 side platforms
- Tracks: 2
- Connections: Muni: 66

Construction
- Accessible: Yes (westbound ramp at 28th Av)

History
- Opened: c. 1910 (URR); April 12, 1919
- Rebuilt: 2022–2024

Services
Preceding station	Muni	Following station
Taraval and 32nd Avenue toward SF Zoo	L Taraval	Taraval and 26th Avenue toward Embarcadero
Location

Taraval and 30th Avenue is a light rail stop on the Muni Metro L Taraval line, located in the Parkside neighborhood of San Francisco, California. The station opened with the first section of the L Taraval line on April 12, 1919; irregular shuttle service had run on a United Railroads line since around 1910.

== Service ==
Between August 2020 and September 2024, service along the route was temporarily substituted by buses to allow for the construction of improvements to the L Taraval line.

The stop is also served by the route 66 bus, plus the L Bus and L Owl bus routes, which provide service along the L Taraval line during the early morning and late night hours respectively when trains do not operate.

== History ==
In June 1908, United Railroads (URR) subsidiary Parkside Transit Company laid a single-track line that ran on 20th Avenue from an existing line on H Street (now Lincoln Way) to Wawona Street, then on Wawona one block to 19th Avenue. A connecting shuttle line running from 20th Avenue on Taraval Street, 33rd Avenue, Vicente Street, and 35th Avenue to Sloat Boulevard (meeting the 12 Ocean line) was opened by 1910. This trackage, which saw infrequent passenger service, formed a barrier to continued expansion of the city-owned Municipal Railway into the Parkside district. On November 25, 1918, the city and the private URR signed the "Parkside Agreements", which allowed Muni streetcars to use URR trackage on Taraval Street and on Ocean Avenue in exchange for a cash payment and shared maintenance costs. Muni's L Taraval line opened to 33rd Avenue (on rebuilt URR trackage west of 20th Avenue) on April 12, 1919. The URR discontinued their Parkside Shuttle in late 1927.

=== Reconstruction ===
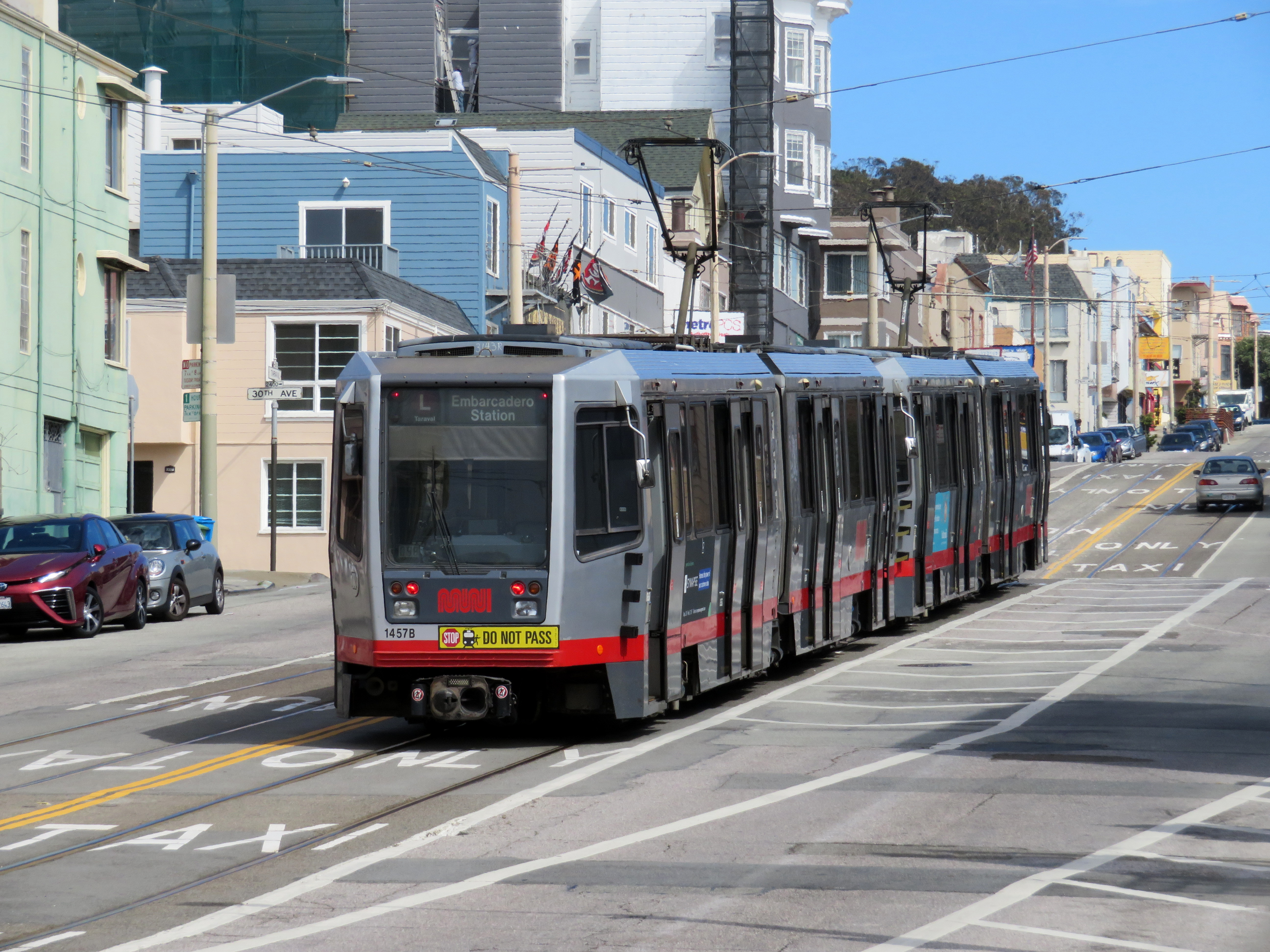
An inbound train at the painted clear zone

Like many stations on the line, Taraval and 30th Avenue has no platforms; trains stop at marked poles before the cross street, and passengers cross travel lanes to board. In March 2014, Muni released details of the proposed implementation of their Transit Effectiveness Project (later rebranded MuniForward), which included a variety of stop changes for the L Taraval line. The stops at 30th Avenue would be moved to the far side of the cross street as boarding islands, with a traffic signal with transit signal priority replacing the existing stop signs to prevent trains from stopping twice.

On September 20, 2016, the SFMTA Board approved the L Taraval Rapid Project. Construction will occur from 2018 to 2020. Boarding islands are planned to be built at 30th Avenue; contrary to the original plan, the stops will remain on the near side of the cross street. A short high-level handicapped-accessible platform will be built on the inbound platform; its outbound counterpart will be at the otherwise closed 28th Avenue stop. Early implementation of some project elements, including painted clear zones where the outbound boarding island will be located, was done in early 2017.

In response to merchants complaining about the loss of parking spaces to allow for boarding islands, the Board agreed to an experimental pilot program on the inbound side at five stops: 26th, 30th, 32nd, 35th, and 40th Avenues. Painted stripes and signage were added to indicate that vehicles should stop behind trains to allow passengers to board and alight safely. If 90% of vehicles were observed to stop behind trains, Muni would not construct inbound boarding islands at the five locations. The six-month testing period ran from April 3, 2017, to October 2017. In November 2017, the SFMTA released the results of the study: only 74% of drivers stopped safely behind trains, and boarding islands will be built (except at 35th Avenue, which was closed for operational reasons in 2018). Painted clear zones were added at the remaining four inbound stops in 2018.

Construction on the accessible platform began in August 2023 and wrapped up in late September 2024.
