= Taraval and 28th Avenue station =

Muni Metro light rail stop in San Francisco

Taraval and 28th Avenue
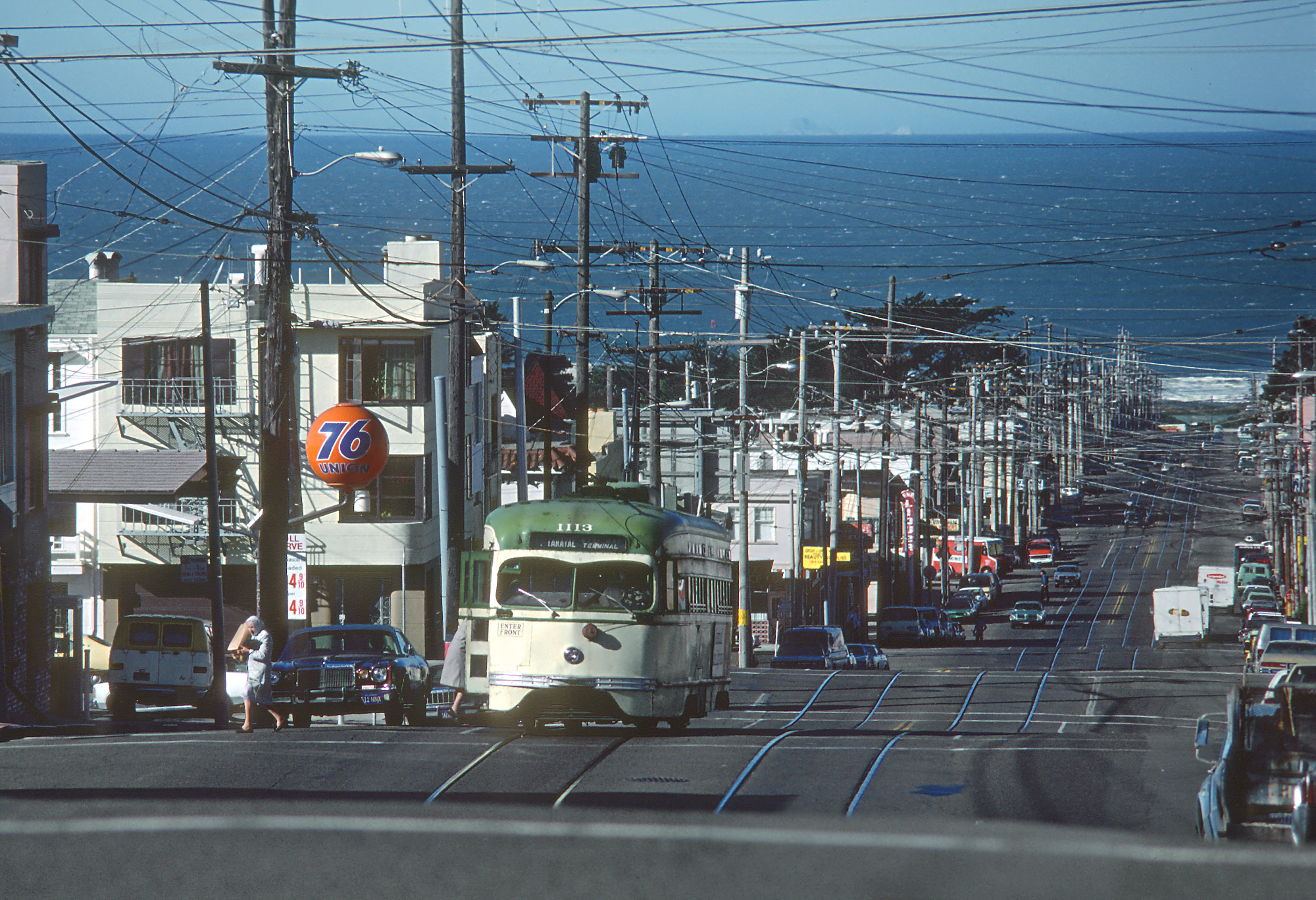
- An inbound streetcar stopped at 28th Avenue in 1980

General information
- Location: Taraval Street at 28th Avenue; San Francisco, California
- Coordinates: 37.74263°N 122.48534°W
- Owner: MUNI

History
- Opened: c. 1910 (URR); April 12, 1919
- Closed: February 25, 2017

Former services
Preceding station	Muni	Following station
Taraval and 30th Avenue toward SF Zoo	L Taraval	Taraval and 26th Avenue toward Embarcadero
Location

Taraval and 28th Avenue was a light rail stop on the Muni Metro L Taraval line, located in the Parkside neighborhood of San Francisco, California. The station opened with the first section of the L Taraval line on April 12, 1919; irregular shuttle service had run on a United Railroads line since around 1910. Service to the station was discontinued on February 25, 2017 as part of the L Taraval Rapid project.

== History ==
In June 1908, United Railroads (URR) subsidiary Parkside Transit Company laid a single-track line that ran on 20th Avenue from an existing line on H Street (now Lincoln Way) to Wawona Street, then on Wawona one block to 19th Avenue. A connecting shuttle line running from 20th Avenue on Taraval Street, 33rd Avenue, Vicente Street, and 35th Avenue to Sloat Boulevard (meeting the 12 Ocean line) was opened by 1910. This trackage, which saw infrequent passenger service, formed a barrier to continued expansion of the city-owned Municipal Railway into the Parkside district. On November 25, 1918, the city and the private URR signed the "Parkside Agreements", which allowed Muni streetcars to use URR trackage on Taraval Street and on Ocean Avenue in exchange for a cash payment and shared maintenance costs. Muni's L Taraval line opened to 33rd Avenue (on rebuilt URR trackage west of 20th Avenue) on April 12, 1919. The URR discontinued their Parkside Shuttle in late 1927.

=== Closure ===
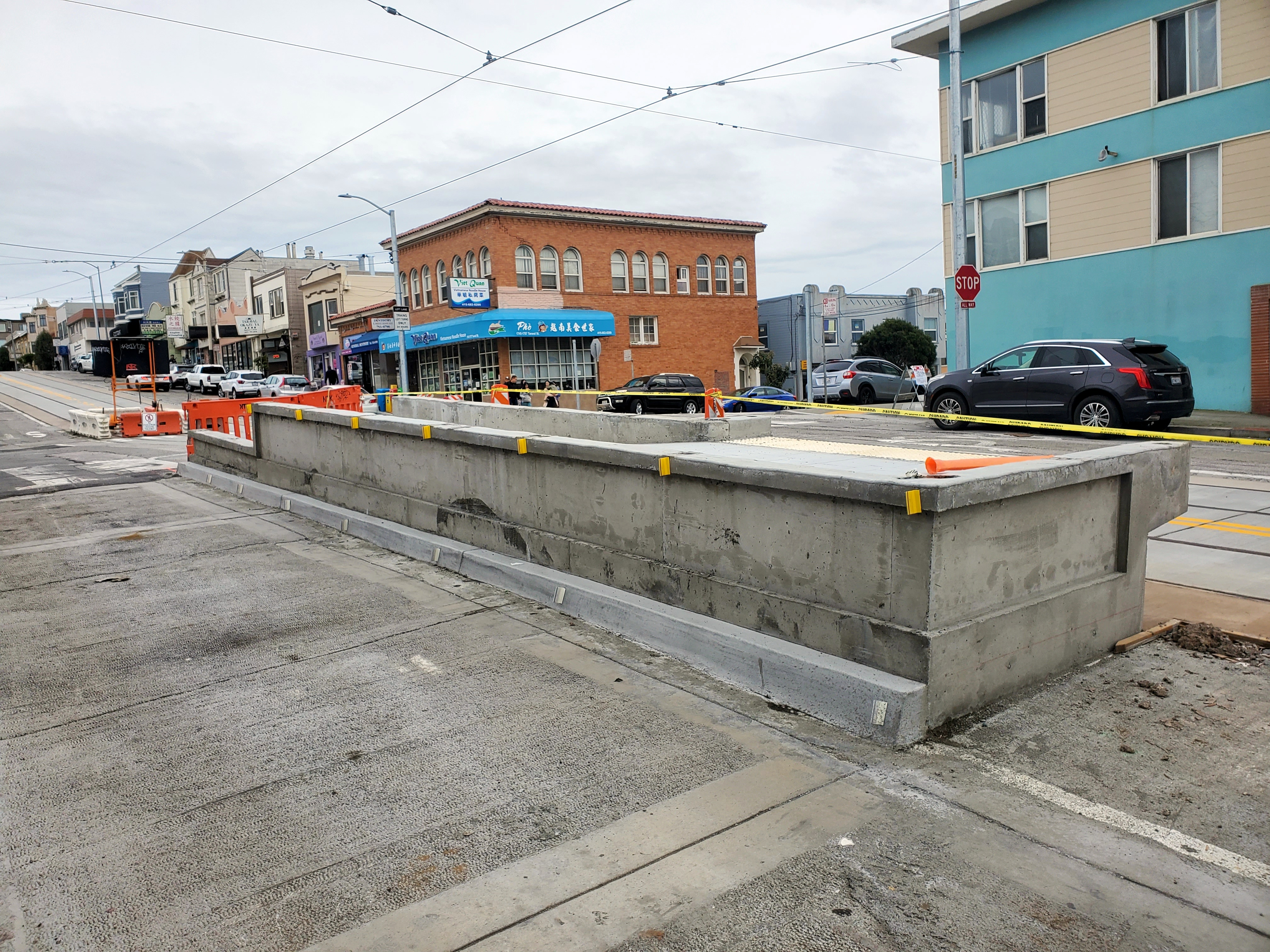
The accessible platform under construction in February 2024

Like many stations on the line, Taraval and 28th Avenue had no platforms; trains stop at marked poles before the cross street, and passengers crossed travel lanes to board. In March 2014, Muni released details of the proposed implementation of their Transit Effectiveness Project (later rebranded MuniForward), which included a variety of stop changes for the L Taraval line. The stops at 28th Avenue would be moved to the far side of the cross street as boarding islands, with a traffic signal with transit signal priority replacing the existing stop signs to prevent trains from stopping twice.

On September 20, 2016, the SFMTA Board approved the L Taraval Rapid Project. Construction will occur from 2018 to 2020. Early implementation of stop eliminations and other changes, including the closure of the 28 Avenue stop due to its proximity to the 26th Avenue and 30th Avenue stops, occurred on February 25, 2017. A small accessible high-level platform will be constructed at 28th Avenue to serve outbound trains; however, it will functionally be part of the 30th Avenue stop rather than a separate stop.
