= Alex McCrindle =

Scottish actor (1911–1990)

- McCrindle in Star Wars
- Born: 3 August 1911; Glasgow, Scotland
- Died: 20 April 1990 (aged 78); Edinburgh, Scotland
- Occupation: Actor
- Years active: 1937–1990
- Spouse(s): Sandy McCrindle (divorced) Honor Arundel (m. 1952; died 1973)
- Children: Catherine, Jessica, and Jean

Alex McCrindle (3 August 1911 – 20 April 1990) was a Scottish actor. He was best known for his role as General Jan Dodonna in Star Wars.

== Biography ==
McCrindle was born in Glasgow. He began his acting career in 1937 starring in minor roles in UK Television. From 1946 to 1951 he played the role of Jock Anderson in Dick Barton – Special Agent. In 1951 he starred in his first film in the USA, The House in the Square. From there his acting career took off. He then did five more films: I Believe in You (1952), The Kidnappers (1953), Trouble in the Glen (1954), Geordie (1955) and Depth Charge (1960).

From 1962 to 1974 he went to television acting. In 1976 he was cast in the first Star Wars film as General Jan Dodonna, the first character to use the phrase "May the Force be with you", in any Star Wars media. He went back to minor roles on TV, including the role of the eccentric veterinarian Ewan Ross on All Creatures Great and Small.

McCrindle was a founding member of the actors' trade union Scottish Equity.

== Personal life ==
McCrindle's second wife was the children's novelist and political activist Honor Arundel (1919–1973). He was survived by his three children: Catherine, Jessica, and Jean. According to Doris Lessing, McCrindle and Arundel's home in the 1950s was a hub of Communist Party activity and organisation.

== Filmography ==
=== Film ===
Year	Title	Role	Notes
1951	I'll Never Forget You	James Boswell	Uncredited
1952	I Believe in You	Tom Haines	
1953	Gilbert Harding Speaking of Murder	Music Critic	
1953	The Kidnappers	The Minister	Uncredited
1954	Trouble in the Glen	Keegan	
1955	Geordie	Guard	Uncredited
1960	Depth Charge	Skipper	
1970	The Private Life of Sherlock Holmes	Baggageman	
1977	Star Wars	General Jan Dodonna	
1978	The Peregrine Hunters	Hawkeye Brown	
1979	Correction, Please	Hepworth	
1981	Eye of the Needle	Tom	
1986	Comrades	Jailor	

=== Television ===
Year	Title	Role	Notes
1937	The Ghost Train	Jackson	TV Short
1938	On the Spot	Patrolman Ryan	TV movie
1938	Juno and the Paycock	Sewing Machine Man	TV movie
1938	The Knight of the Burning Pestle	George Greengoose	TV movie
1952	Wednesday Theatre	Philibent	1 episode
1953	BBC Sunday-Night Theatre	Scotsman	1 episode
1953	Wednesday Theatre	Mr. Poprad	1 episode
1954	Rheingold Theatre	Kelly	1 episode
1956	Adventure Theatre	Music Critic	
1962	The Dark Island	Mr Stewart	3 episodes
1962	The Master of Ballantrae	Captain Teach	2 episodes
1963	Kidnapped	1st Crofter	
1964	Witch Wood	Rev. Proudfoot	TV movie
1965	The Saint	Fergus MacLish	1 episode
1965	Undermind	Professor Emmett	1 episode
1966–1967	This Man Craig	Willie Sinclair	52 episodes
1968	The Flight of the Heron	Keppoch	2 episodes
1968	Mystery and Imagination	Lapraik	1 episode
1971	The View from Daniel Pike	Capt. McPhee	1 episode
1973	The View from Daniel Pike	Shakespeare	1 episode
1973	Adam Smith	Jimmy Black	1 episode
1973	Sutherland's Law	James Keenan	1 episode
1974	Sutherland's Law	MacGillivray	1 episode
1975	The Hill of the Red Fox	Deckhand	1 episode
1976	Shadows	Mr. Campbell	1 episode
1978	Play for Today	Tam	1 episode
1978	All Creatures Great and Small	Ewan Ross	1 episode
1979	Dick Turpin	Dr. Hector Andrews	1 episode
1979	Play for Today	Father	1 episode
1980	Sounding Brass	Mr Mackenzie	5 episodes
1980	Mackenzie	Bill Campbell	2 episodes
1982	Cloud Howe	Old Leslie	4 episodes
1982	The Gentle Touch	Old Man	1 episode
1983	Flying into the Wind	The Tramp	TV movie
1983	Reilly: Ace of Spies	MacDougal	1 episode
1984	The Country Diary of an Edwardian Lady	Macbeth Bain	1 episode
1984	Sakharov	Siberia Trainman	TV movie
1988	The Play on One	Wilf	Episode: "Normal Service"
1988	Taggart	Tramp	1 episode
1989	Screen Two	Man in Office	Season 5: Leaving
1988–1990	High Road	Bert	3 episodes, (final appearance)
