= Taraval and 40th Avenue station =

Muni Metro light rail stop in San Francisco

Taraval and 40th Avenue
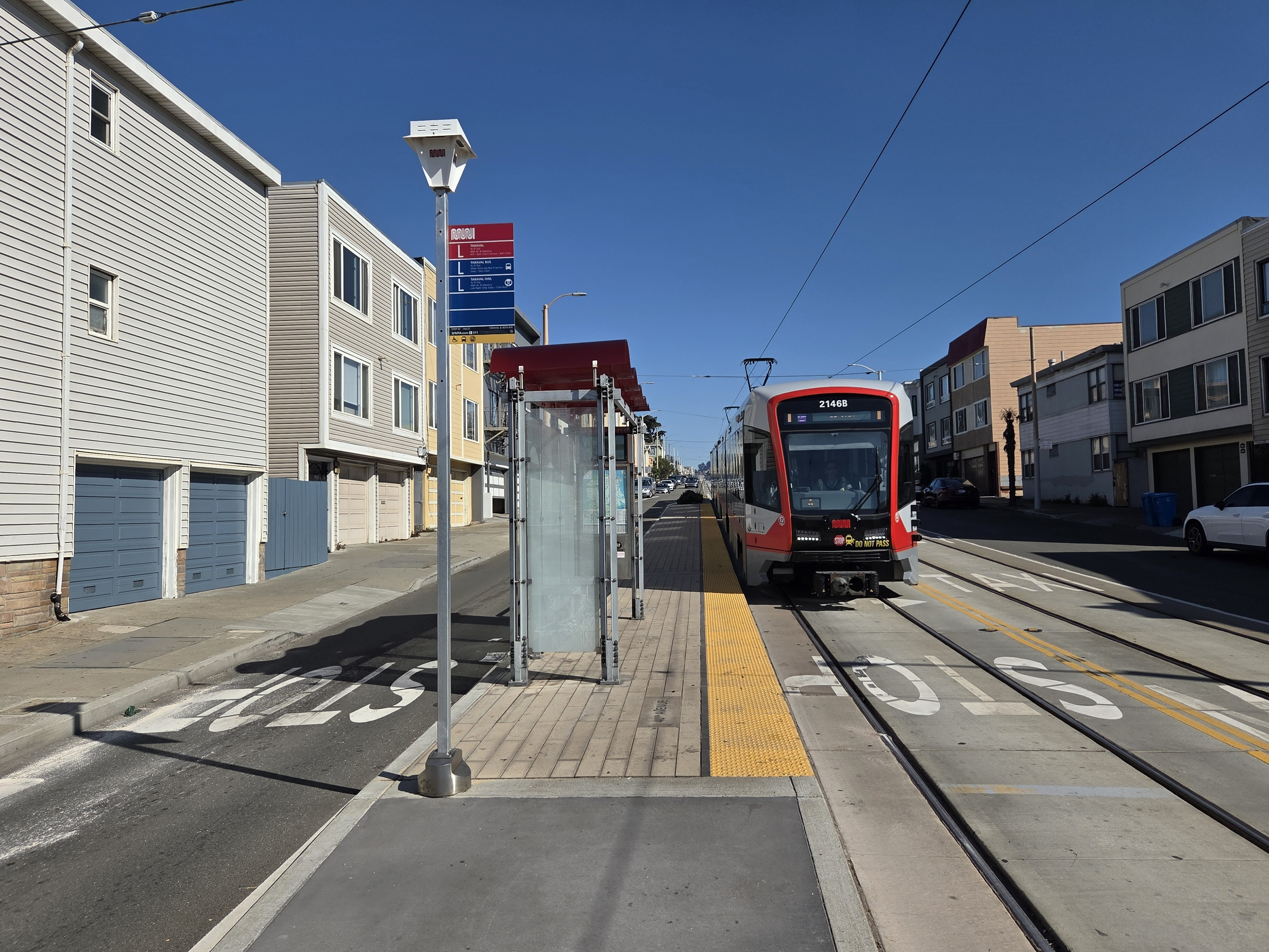
- An outbound train at Taraval and 40th Avenue in 2025

General information
- Location: Taraval Street at 40th Avenue; San Francisco, California
- Coordinates: 37.74205°N 122.49819°W
- Platforms: 2 side platforms
- Tracks: 2

Construction
- Accessible: No

History
- Opened: January 14, 1923
- Rebuilt: 2019–2021

Services
Preceding station	Muni	Following station
Taraval and 42nd Avenue toward SF Zoo	L Taraval	Taraval and Sunset toward Embarcadero
Location

Taraval and 40th Avenue is a light rail stop on the Muni Metro L Taraval line, located in the Parkside neighborhood of San Francisco, California, United States. The station opened with the second section of the L Taraval line on January 14, 1923.

== Service ==
In August 2020, service along the route was replaced by buses to allow for the construction of improvements to the L Taraval line. The project was finished on September 28, 2024, and train service along the line resumed on that day.

The stop is served by the L Bus and L Owl bus routes, which provide service along the L Taraval line during the early morning and late night hours respectively when trains do not operate.

== Reconstruction ==
Like many stations on the line, Taraval and 40th Avenue has no platforms; trains stop at marked poles before the cross street, and passengers cross travel lanes to board. In March 2014, Muni released details of the proposed implementation of their Transit Effectiveness Project (later rebranded MuniForward), which included a variety of stop changes for the L Taraval line. The stops at 40th Avenue would be moved to the far side of the cross street as boarding islands, with a traffic signal with transit signal priority replacing the existing stop signs to prevent trains from stopping twice.

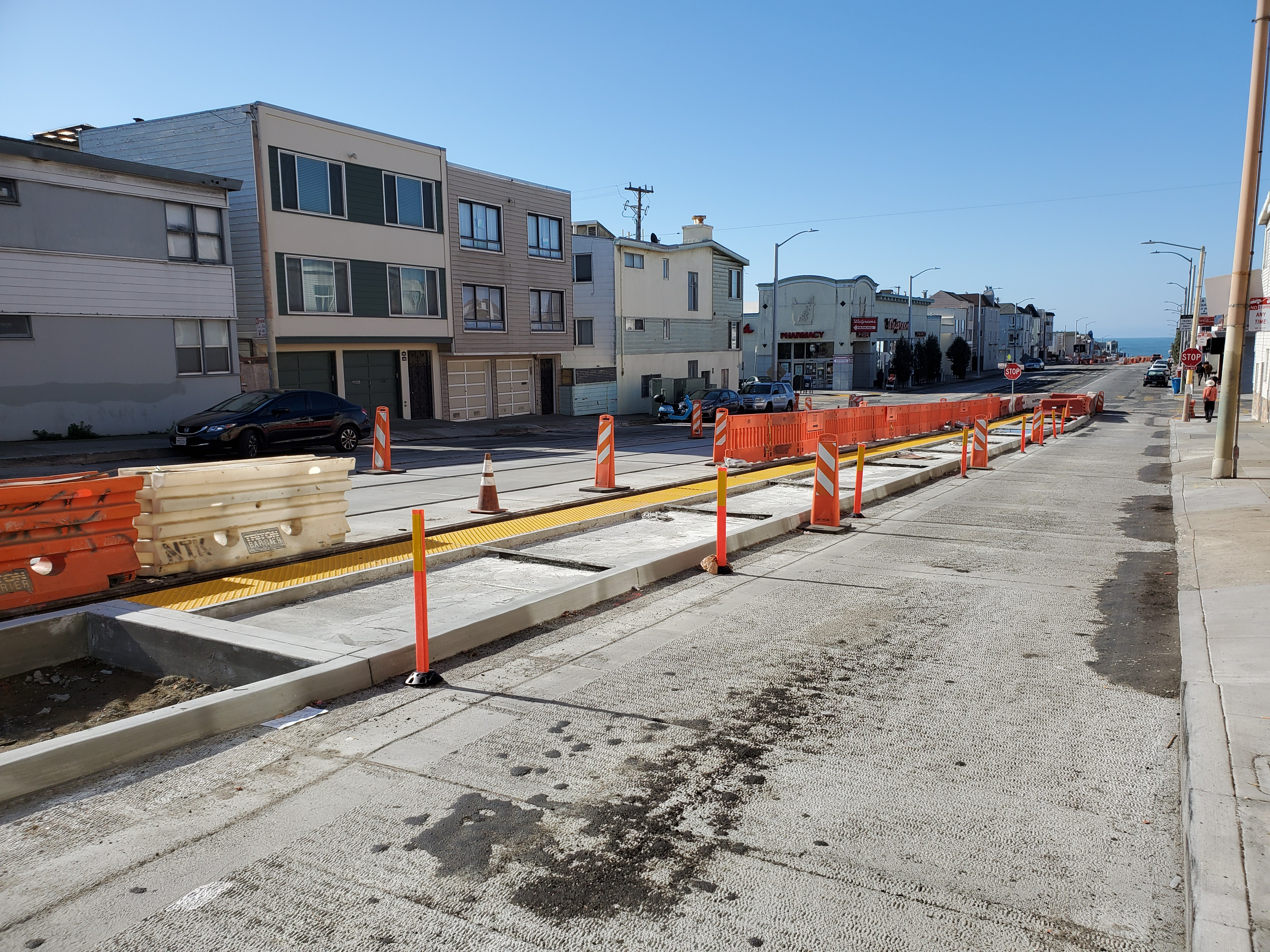
Outbound platform construction in 2021

On September 20, 2016, the SFMTA Board approved the L Taraval Rapid Project. Construction will occur from 2018 to 2020. Boarding islands are planned to be built at 40th Avenue; contrary to the original plan, the stops will remain on the near side of the cross street, with no new signal. Early implementation of some project elements, including painted clear zones where the outbound boarding island will be located, was done in early 2017.

In response to merchants complaining about the loss of parking spaces to allow for boarding islands, the Board agreed to an experimental pilot program on the inbound side at five stops: 26th, 30th, 32nd, 35th, and 40th Avenues. Painted stripes and signage were added to indicate that vehicles should stop behind trains to allow passengers to board and alight safely. If 90% of vehicles were observed to stop behind trains, Muni would not construct inbound boarding islands at the five locations. The six-month testing period ran from April 3, 2017, to October 2017. In November 2017, the SFMTA released the results of the study: only 74% of drivers stopped safely behind trains, and boarding islands will be built (except at 35th Avenue, which was closed for operational reasons in 2018). Painted clear zones were added at the remaining four inbound stops in 2018.

Construction on the first phase of the project, between 33rd Avenue and 46th Avenue, began in September 2019. When Muni Metro service resumed on August 22, 2020, after a five-month closure during the COVID-19 pandemic, L Taraval service remained suspended west of Sunset Boulevard for construction. Rail service was re-replaced with buses on August 25 due to issues with malfunctioning overhead wire splices and the need to quarantine control center staff after a COVID-19 case. Construction of the outbound platform began on November 24, 2020; construction of the inbound platform began on March 15, 2021. The first phase of the project, including the platforms at 40th Avenue, was completed in July 2021.
