= Jean McCrindle =

Feminist and activist (1937–2022)

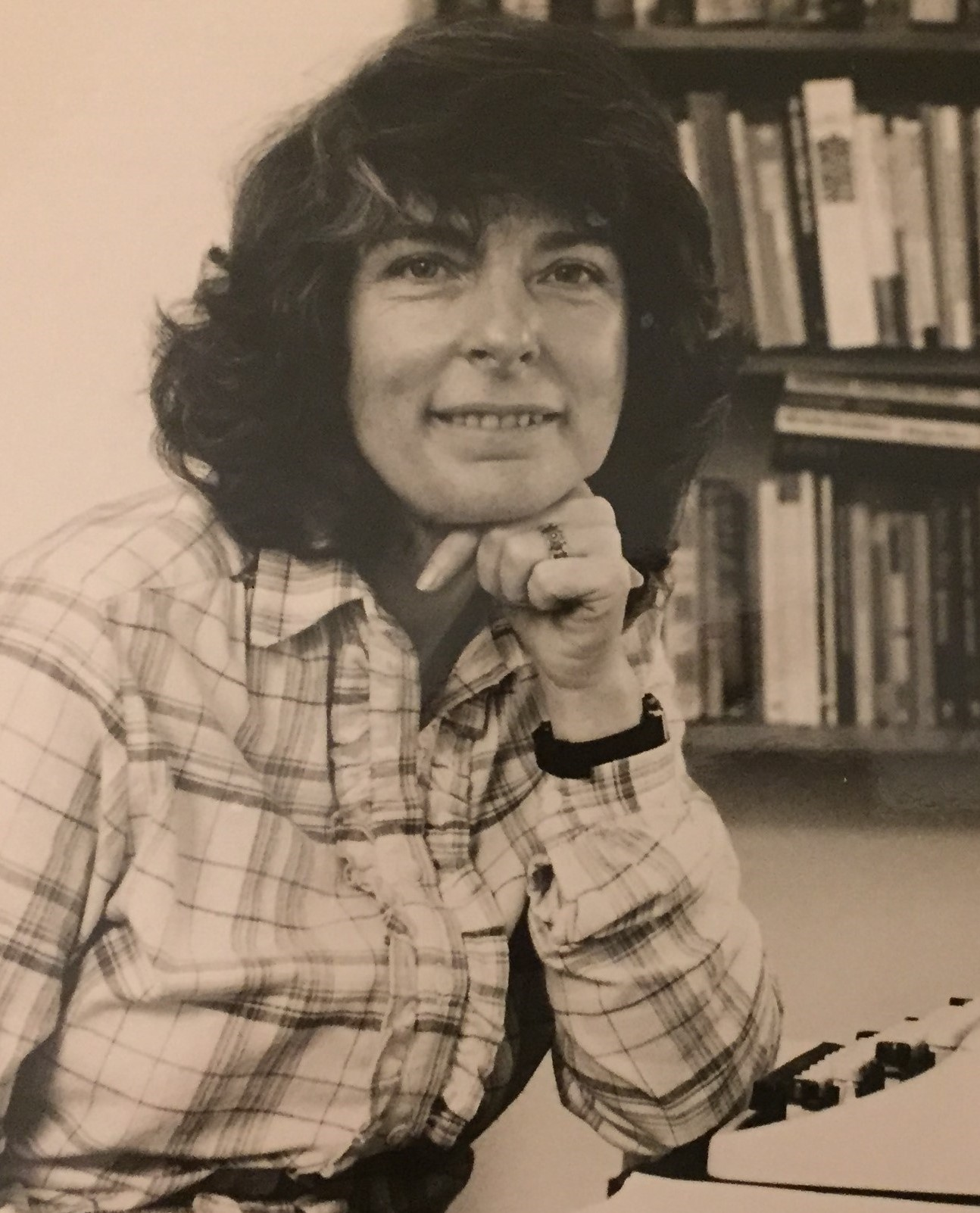
- McCrindle at her typewriter
- Born: 24 April 1937
- Died: 14 December 2022 (aged 85)
- Education: University of St Andrews
- Occupations: Teacher and lecturer
- Known for: Feminist, socialist, leading figure in Women Against Pit Closures
- Father: Alex McCrindle

Jean McCrindle (24 April 1937 – 14 December 2022) was a feminist and left-wing activist who was prominent in the Women Against Pit Closures movement during the 1984–1985 United Kingdom miners' strike. Her career was as a teacher and lecturer, and she was on the advisory board of the feminist publisher Virago Press.

== Biography ==
Her father was Scottish actor Alex McCrindle; both her parents were members of the Communist Party of Great Britain. She was primarily raised in London by her mother. McCrindle became a Communist in 1955, aged 18, partly under the tutelage of the historian Raphael Samuel. They were briefly engaged. Both left the party the following year, after the Soviet-led invasion of Hungary.

McCrindle studied History the University of St Andrews and was the first secretary of the Scottish New Left Clubs. Her friendship group included many of the key figures in the New Left, including the miners' leader Lawrence Daly, with whom she collaborated in establishing the Fife Socialist League, and the historians E. P. Thompson and Sheila Rowbotham.

Her career was in teaching and lecturing, notably at the Northern College, near Barnsley. She was active in the women's liberation movement and the women's peace movement and was on the advisory board of the feminist publisher Virago Press.

At the time of the 1984–85 miners' strike, she was a political ally of the leader of the National Union of Mineworkers, Arthur Scargill. McCrindle helped to set up the first miners' wives support group and was treasurer of the nationwide Women Against Pit Closures (WAPC), speaking, fund-raising and campaigning widely. She later completed a doctoral thesis about the WAPC movement.

She stood unsuccessfully for the House of Commons twice, as the Labour Party candidate contesting Sheffield Hallam in 1983 and High Peak in 1987.

== Archives ==
McCrindle's papers, including records of the WAPC, have been deposited at the Women's Library at the London School of Economics. An interview with her is held in the British Library Sound Archive.

== Personal life ==
McCrindle married an American, Sam Rohdie – later a film scholar – whom she met when they were both living and working in Ghana in the early 1960s. They had one daughter, Claire.

== Writings ==
- Dutiful Daughters: Women Talk About Their Lives, with Sheila Rowbotham (1977)
- "Reading The Golden Notebook in 1962", in Jenny Taylor (ed), Notebooks/Memoirs/Archives: reading and rereading Doris Lessing, (1982)
- "More than just a memory: some political implications of women's involvement in the miners' strike, 1984–85", with Sheila Rowbotham, Feminist Review, 23/1, 1986
- "The Hungarian Uprising and a Young British Communist", History Workshop Journal, 62, 2006
