= Taraval and 26th Avenue station =

Muni Metro light rail stop in San Francisco

Taraval and 26th Avenue
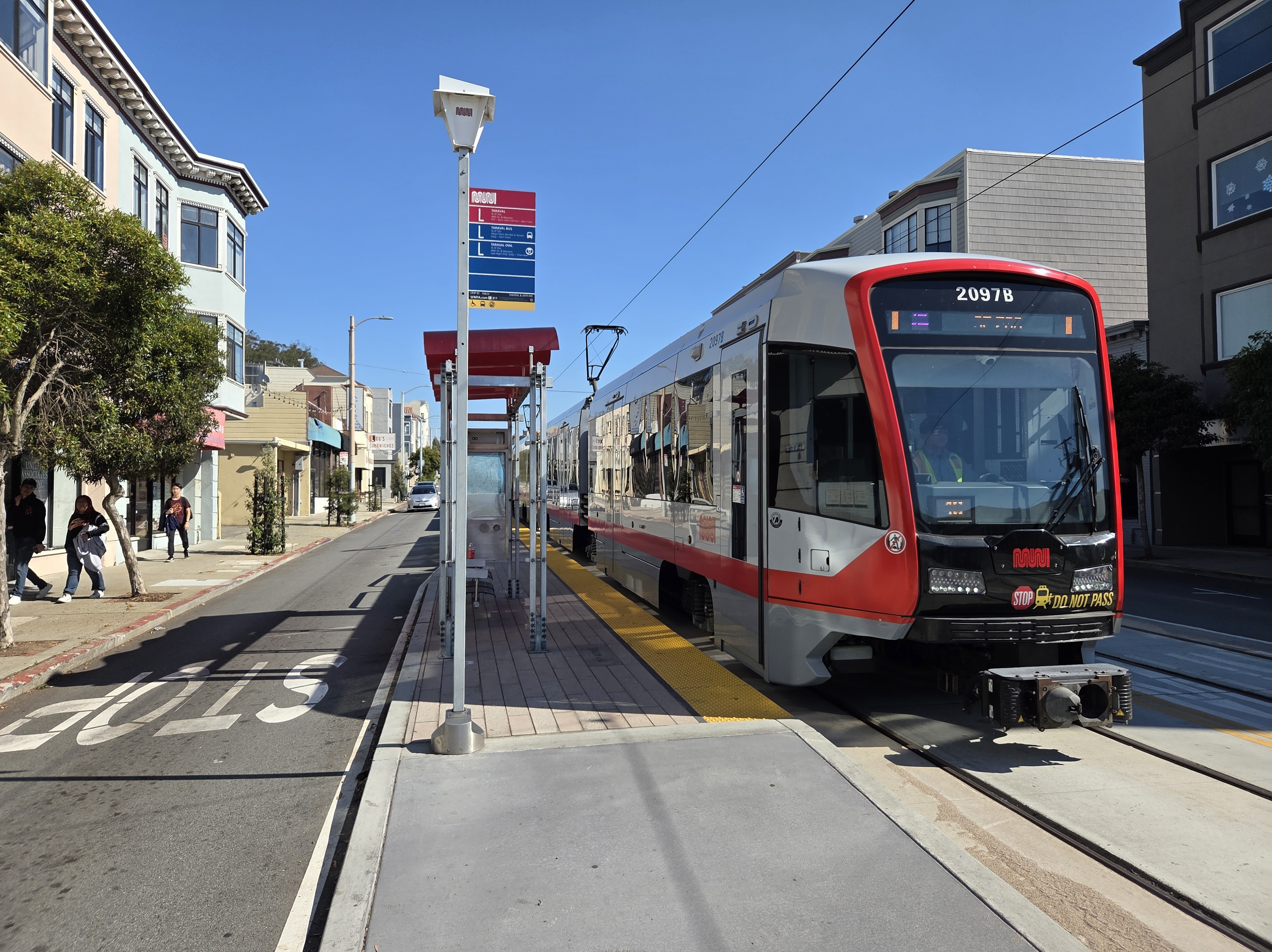
- An outbound train at Taraval and 26th in 2025

General information
- Location: Taraval Street at 26th Avenue; San Francisco, California
- Coordinates: 37.74271°N 122.48319°W
- Platforms: 2 side platforms
- Tracks: 2

Construction
- Accessible: No

History
- Opened: c. 1910 (URR); April 12, 1919
- Rebuilt: 2022–2024

Services
Preceding station	Muni	Following station
Taraval and 30th Avenue toward SF Zoo	L Taraval	Taraval and 22nd/23rd Avenues toward Embarcadero
Location

Taraval and 26th Avenue is a light rail stop on the Muni Metro L Taraval line, located in the Parkside neighborhood of San Francisco, California.

== History ==
In June 1908, United Railroads (URR) subsidiary Parkside Transit Company laid a single-track line that ran on 20th Avenue from an existing line on H Street (now Lincoln Way) to Wawona Street, then on Wawona one block to 19th Avenue. A connecting shuttle line running from 20th Avenue on Taraval Street, 33rd Avenue, Vicente Street, and 35th Avenue to Sloat Boulevard (meeting the 12 Ocean line) was opened by 1910. This trackage, which saw infrequent passenger service, formed a barrier to continued expansion of the city-owned Municipal Railway into the Parkside district. On November 25, 1918, the city and the private URR signed the "Parkside Agreements", which allowed Muni streetcars to use URR trackage on Taraval Street and on Ocean Avenue in exchange for a cash payment and shared maintenance costs. Muni's L Taraval line opened to 33rd Avenue (on rebuilt URR trackage west of 20th Avenue) on April 12, 1919. The URR discontinued their Parkside Shuttle in late 1927.

=== Planned changes ===
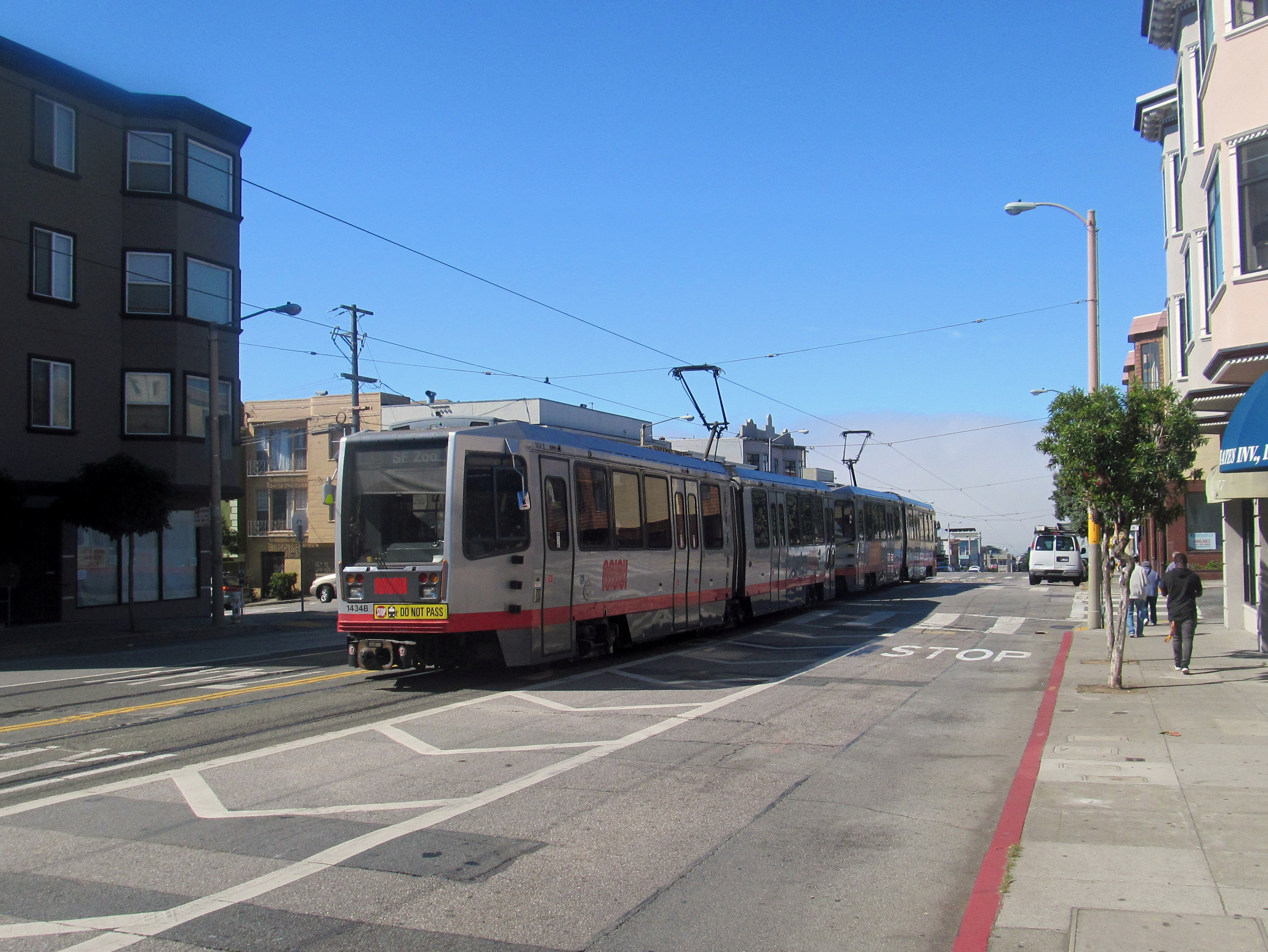
Outbound train stopping at the painted clear zone in September 2017

Like many stations on the line, Taraval and 26th Avenue had no platforms; trains stopped at marked poles before the cross street, and passengers crossed travel lanes to board. In March 2014, Muni released details of the proposed implementation of their Transit Effectiveness Project (later rebranded MuniForward), which included a variety of stop changes for the L Taraval line. The stops at 26th Avenue would be moved to the far side of the cross street as boarding islands, with a traffic signal with transit signal priority replacing the existing stop signs to prevent trains from stopping twice.

On September 20, 2016, the SFMTA Board approved the L Taraval Rapid Project. Construction was to occur from 2018 to 2020. Boarding islands were to be built at 26th Avenue; contrary to the original plan, the stops would remain on the near side of the cross street. Early implementation of some project elements, including painted clear zones where the outbound boarding island would be located, was done in early 2017.

In response to merchants complaining about the loss of parking spaces to allow for boarding islands, the Board agreed to an experimental pilot program on the inbound side at five stops: 26th, 30th, 32nd, 35th, and 40th Avenues. Painted stripes and signage were added to indicate that vehicles should stop behind trains to allow passengers to board and alight safely. If 90% of vehicles were observed to stop behind trains, Muni would not construct inbound boarding islands at the five locations. The six-month testing period ran from April 3, 2017 to October 2017. In November 2017, the SFMTA released the results of the study: only 74% of drivers stopped safely behind trains, and boarding islands would be built (except at 35th Avenue, which was closed for operational reasons in 2018). Painted clear zones were added at the remaining four inbound stops in 2018.

On March 30, 2020, all Muni Metro service was replaced with buses due to the COVID-19 pandemic. Muni Metro rail service returned on August 22, 2020, but was replaced again by buses on August 25. Construction on Segment B of the project, between West Portal and Sunset Boulevard, began in January 2022 and was completed in mid-2024. L Taraval rail service resumed on September 28, 2024.
