= Parkside Elementary School (Murray, Utah) =

Coordinates: 40.6584°N 111.8771°W

== Introduction ==
Parkside Elementary School is a K-6th grade school located in Murray, Utah. It is a part of the Murray School District. The school's principal is Heather Nicholas.

== Fun Facts ==
Founded = 1969

Grades = K-6

Enrollment = 616

Colors = Blue and white

Mascot = Panthers

Chess Club Founded = 2013

Chess Club Founded by = Nils Larson, Nathan Fetzer, and Samuel Powell

== Notable alumni ==
- Cody Giles
- Andrew Buck Corser
- Elisabeth Johnson
- Nils Larson
- Dustin Matsumori
- Olivia Shelton
- Brek
