= Women Against Pit Closures =

British political campaign

Women Against Pit Closures (WAPC) was a political movement supporting miners and their families in the UK miners' strike of 1984–1985. The movement is credited with bringing feminist ideas into practice in an industrial dispute and empowering women to take a public role in a community with a male-dominated sphere.

== History ==
WAPC group and support work grew from the communal feeding of families in April and May 1984 to a more explicitly political role. It was established by a group of working-class women in Barnsley, Yorkshire. In July 1984 a formal WAPC committee was formed. A multitude of local support groups were also set up early on in the year-long strike, including Nottinghamshire. The national group was chaired by Ann Lilburn, a Northumberland miner's wife and mother of two striking miners from Whittle colliery.

"As the hardship bit deeper, the stronger became the women's resolve. They began to march with their men, and attend rallies and meetings, learning all the time. Previously non-political, reserved women emerged as gifted creators, and spoke at meetings in order to raise money to continue the task ahead of them."

An early event was a rally at the end of May 1984, held in Barnsley which was attended by 5000 women from coalfields across Britain, from Scotland to Kent. This was followed by a conference in June and a large protest march in London on 11 August 1984. 23,000 working-class women attended that event, joined by other women trade unionists.

"As we passed Downing Street we became silent as we stopped our singing. We donned black scarves, and arm bands and wore black flowers in memory of Davy Jones and Joe Green who had died on our picket lines. We averted our eyes as we marched past Thatcher's residence to show our contempt"

The name "Women Against Pit Closures" was adopted at a national delegate conference in Chesterfield, Derbyshire, in December 1984. The word women was specifically chosen, rather than wives or ladies.

The group sought Associate Membership of the National Union of Mineworkers (NUM). Many local NUM branches relinquished the organisation of food and welfare support to WAPC groups. Crèches were established so that mothers had more freedom to participate in WAPC activities, such as picketing, public speaking and organising events.

A rally was at organised at Saltergate Football Stadium in Chesterfield for International Women's Day 1985. Ann Scargill regularly spoke at WAPC events in Yorkshire. Women in Nottinghamshire also spoke out against pit closures, including Ida Hackett. Hackett was chair of the Nottinghamshire Women Against Pit closures and she and Notts miners wives spoke at meetings outside Notts. and abroad appealing for support for the miners.

The phrase "hayway the lasses" was associated with WAPC in the northeast of England and songs were sung by women at rallies and marches across Britain:

We are women, we are strong, We are fighting for our lives, Side by side with our men, Who work the nation’s mines, United by the past, And it’s – Here we go! Here we go! For the women of the working class

== Influences ==
WAPC was influenced by contemporary women's peace movements like the Greenham Common Women's Peace Camp, and contested the economic policies of the Thatcherite government.

Some members had links to the Communist Party of Great Britain and the Women’s Liberation Movement, whilst others were angry at how anti-strike miner's wives were initially gaining prominence in the national press.

The organising of WAPC has been credited with "profoundly changed relationships between men and women in mining communities."

== Archives ==
Material relating to Women Against Pit Closures, including letters, campaigns, poetry, minutes, photographs, newspapers and magazines, is held in the Labour History Archive and Study Centre at the People’s History Museum in Manchester.

Treasurer Jean McCrindle's archive is held at the London School of Economics (LSE) Library.

Christmas cards produced by Sheffield Women Against Pit Closures are held at the Sheffield Local Studies library.

Barnsley Museum's "Coal Not Dole: Barnsley Women Against Pit Closures" exhibition in 2024 commemorated 40 years since the strike.

== Notable members ==
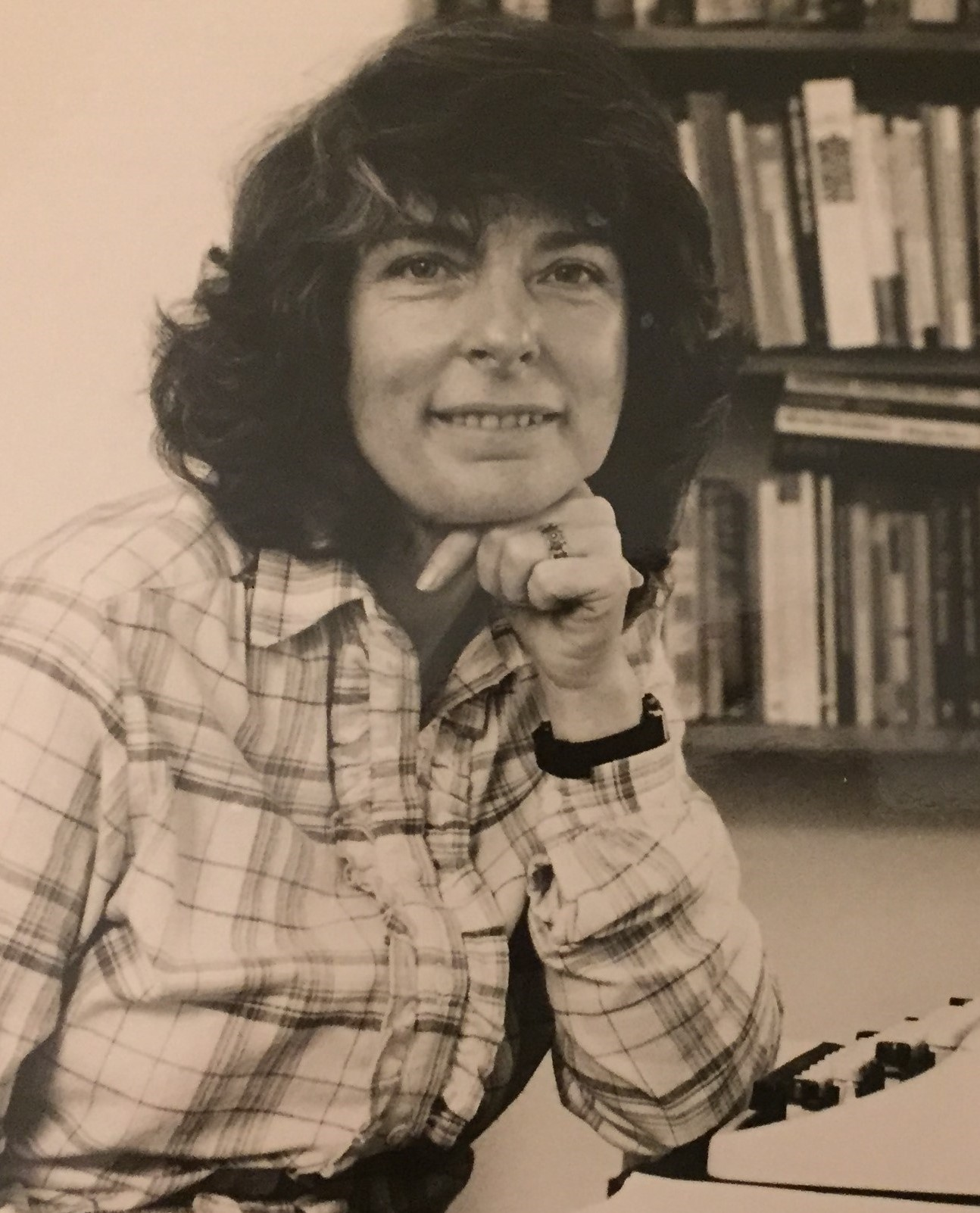
Jean McCrindle

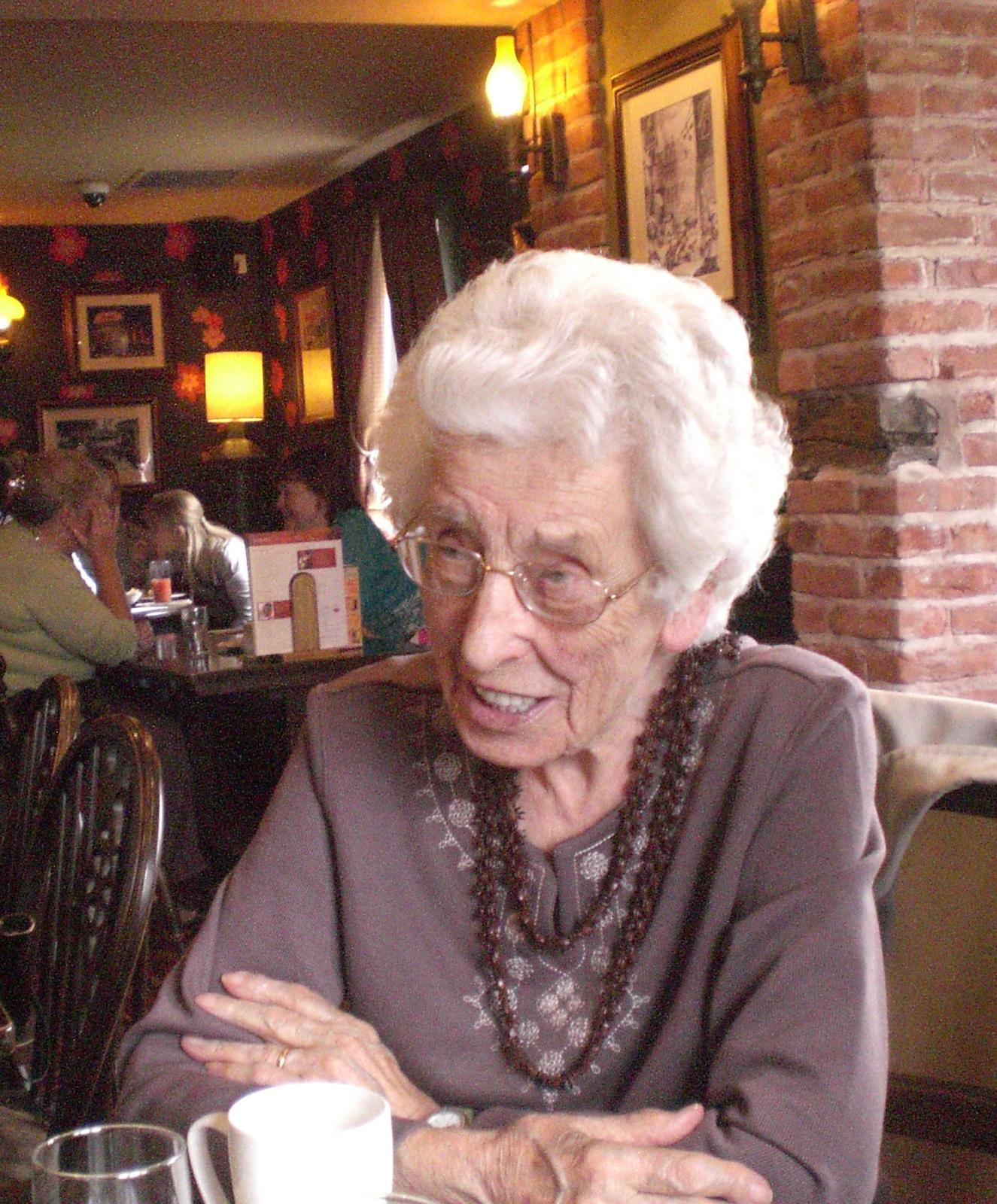
Photograph of Ida Hackett

- Lorraine Bowler
- Betty Cook
- Betty Heathfield
- Siân James
- Ann Lilburn
- Jean McCrindle
- Caroline Poland
- Anne Scargill
- Heather Wood
- Ida Hackett
