= Parkside Colliery =

Former coal mine in Lancashire, England

- Location within Merseyside
- Location: Newton-le-Willows, Lancashire (later Merseyside), England; 53.4485°N 2.6022°W
- Products: Coal
- Opened: 1957
- Closed: 1993
- Company: British Coal

Parkside Colliery was a coal mine in Newton-le-Willows, in the historic county of Lancashire, but from 1974, until its closure in 1993, it was in Metropolitan Borough of St Helens, in the metropolitan county of Merseyside. It was always described as being in Lancashire, and was the last deep coal mine operating in the Lancashire Coalfield upon closure.

== History ==
The sinking of the shafts started in 1957, with at least one fatality before any coal had been wound to the surface. The site commenced operations in 1959, when the groundworks had been completed. Developing the site had cost the National Coal Board (NCB), over £13 million; however, the first coal brought to the surface did not occur until 1964, seven years after the initial groundworks on site. A pair of Koepe winding towers, both 200 feet (61 m) high, were installed above the shafts, both were made of concrete and destroyed fairly quickly after closure.

Production from the mine peaked in the 1970s, when over 1,600 miners were employed at Parkside. On average, over 760,000 tonnes (840,000 tons) of coal was mined during this most productive time. The deepest shaft was 886 yards (810 m), and coal was mined using the longwall mining method.

The mine suffered from methane in the coal faces, with it being piped above ground where it was used in the mine's boilers, or vented into the atmosphere. It was later piped direct to a chemical works in Warrington via a 7.5 miles (12 km) pipeline that carried between 12 and 15 million therms of gas per year.

In its final years, the mine employed 750 to 800 people, and its output was railed in merry-go-round trains from the site to Fiddlers Ferry power station north of the River Mersey, in Cheshire.

== Closure ==
The mine was ceased production in October 1992, but kept open on a care and maintenance programme whilst the 1990s pit closures were assessed by British Coal. During the unworked period before final closure, a group of four women, led by Anne Scargill (the then wife of Arthur Scargill), staged an "occupy protest" against the pit closure. They stayed underground for four days before resurfacing on 12 April 1993. The story was later turned into a play, "Queens of the Coal Age", by Maxine Peake, which was also later dramatised on Radio 4.

The closure of the colliery caused 84 MPs to sign a motion protesting about the ending of coaling operations. They stated that the mine had been in profit for the last six years, and that a new seam had recently been opened which had involved the procurement of over £6 million worth of machinery to work the new seam. Another issue raised was that of closure without proper consultation; British Coal announced the intention to close loss-making pits, and "Less than 36 hours later, at 7.15 am on Friday 23 October [1992], the president and secretary of the Parkside branch of the National Union of Mineworkers were called to the colliery deputy manager's office and told that, as from 7 pm that night, all coal production would cease. That was the total extent of the Secretary of State's 'genuine consultation.'" The High Court decided in May 1993, that the colliery could legally be closed. The rush to destroy the winding towers after the protest, left all the valuable equipment unrecovered below the surface.

Parkside Colliery was the last working pit in the Lancashire Coalfield; when it closed, it was the last one in a history of coal-mining in the county that had stretched back for 700 years.

The miners later took British Coal to court over the fact that they were made to accept the terms of redundancy, rather than being offered the chance to be redeployed to other coal mines.

== Regeneration ==
After closure, the site lay dormant, but it was elected as a possible Strategic Rail Freight Interchange (SRFI) by the rail industry with applications submitted covering an area of 7,700,000 square feet (715,000 m^{2}) of warehousing, sidings and roads. This venture was withdrawn during the economic downturn of 2008. The site was still being proposed as an SRFI in 2016, with approval being granted in December 2019.

== Notable people ==
- Frank Collier - professional rugby league player who would work in the pit during the week and play rugby for Wigan, Widnes and Salford at the weekends.
- Chris Arkwright - professional rugby league player who would work in the pit during the week and play rugby for St.Helens at the weekends.
