= Taraval and Sunset station =

Muni Metro light rail stop in San Francisco

Taraval and Sunset
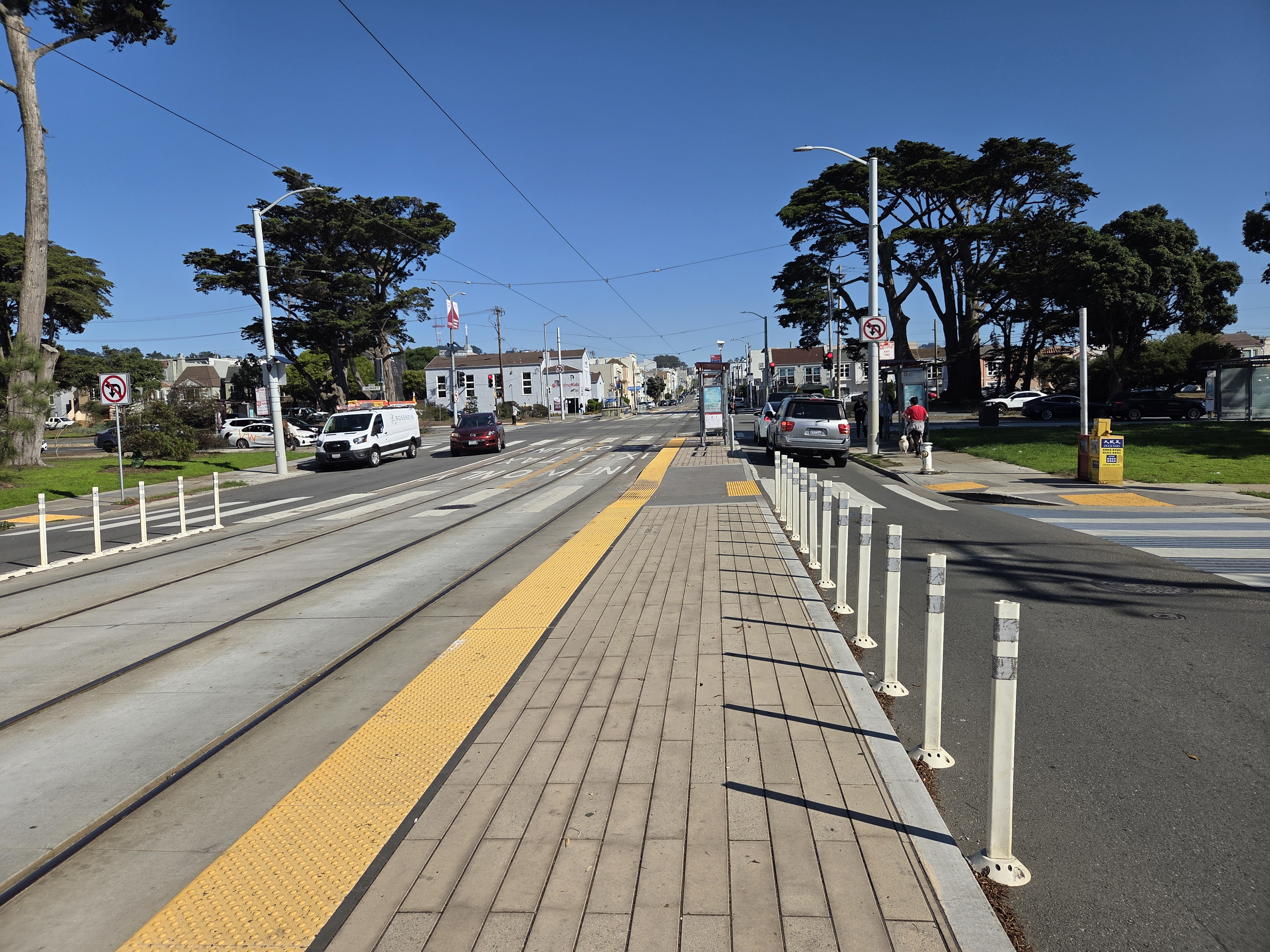
- The inbound platform at Taraval and Sunset in 2025

General information
- Location: Taraval Street at Sunset Boulevard; San Francisco, California
- Coordinates: 37.74222°N 122.49438°W
- Platforms: 2 side platforms
- Tracks: 2
- Connections: Muni: 29

Construction
- Accessible: Yes

History
- Opened: January 14, 1923
- Rebuilt: 2019–2024

Services
Preceding station	Muni	Following station
Taraval and 40th Avenue toward SF Zoo	L Taraval	Taraval and 32nd Avenue toward Embarcadero
Location

Taraval and Sunset is a light rail stop on the Muni Metro L Taraval line, located in the Parkside neighborhood of San Francisco, California. The station opened with the second section of the L Taraval line on January 14, 1923.

== Service ==
In August 2020, service along the route was replaced by buses to allow for the construction of improvements to the L Taraval line. The project was finished on September 28, 2024, and train service along the line resumed on that day.

The stop is also served by the route 29 bus, plus the L Bus and L Owl bus routes, which provide service along the L Taraval line during the early morning and late night hours respectively when trains do not operate.

== Reconstruction ==
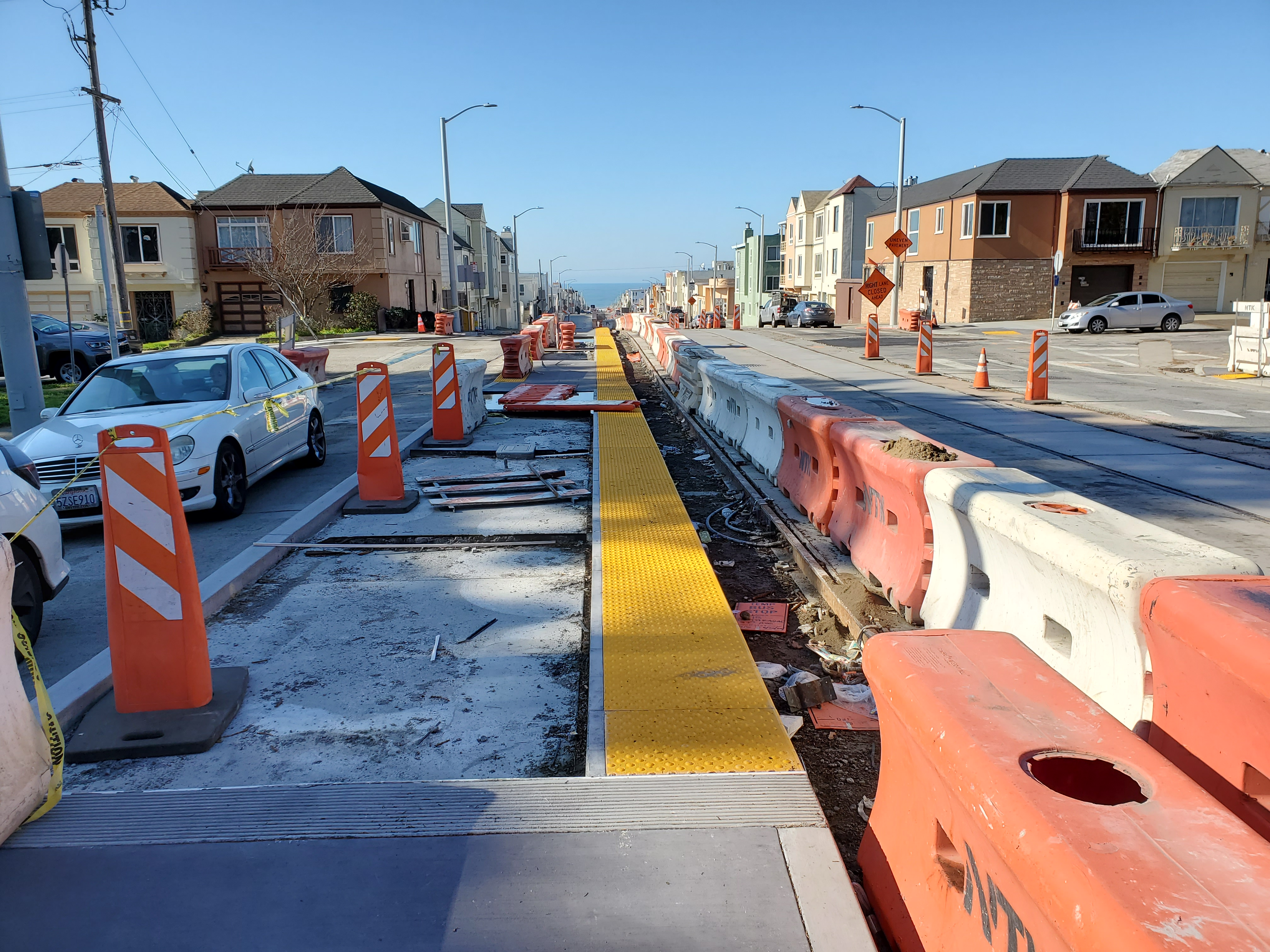
Platform reconstruction in January 2021

The station is located at the intersection of Taraval Street with the Sunset Boulevard parkway, which is flanked by 37th Avenue on the west and 36th Avenue on the east. The station has the same layout as Judah and Sunset: a curb-level eastbound platform is located between 37th Avenue and Sunset, with the accessible mini-high platform west of 37th Avenue. Both the curb-level and accessible portions of the westbound platform are located between Sunset and 36th Avenue.

In March 2014, Muni released details of the proposed implementation of their Transit Effectiveness Project (later rebranded MuniForward), which included a variety of stop changes for the L Taraval line. Because Taraval and Sunset already had platforms – unlike most stops on the line – no changes to the stop were proposed. On September 20, 2016, the SFMTA Board approved the L Taraval Rapid Project. The current platforms were to be extended to the full length of a train, necessitating left-turn prohibitions at 36th and 37th Avenues.

Construction on the first phase of the project, between 33rd Avenue and 46th Avenue, began in September 2019. When Muni Metro service resumed on August 22, 2020, after a five-month closure during the COVID-19 pandemic, L Taraval service remained suspended west of Sunset Boulevard for construction. Trains reversed direction using the crossover west of 35th Avenue, with the westbound platform at Sunset serving as the terminal. Rail service was re-replaced with buses on August 25 due to issues with malfunctioning overhead wire splices and the need to quarantine control center staff after a COVID-19 case.

Construction of a replacement accessible eastbound platform began on October 26, 2020, with reconstruction of the westbound platform beginning later that year. The first phase of the project, including the platforms at Sunset Boulevard, was completed in July 2021.
