= Parkside railway station (Derbyshire) =

Railway station in Derbyshire, England

Coordinates: 53.1746°N 1.6095°W

Parkside railway station was the only station on the Derbyshire Dales Narrow Gauge Railway. Derbyshire Dales Narrow Gauge Railway was a short narrow-gauge railway operating at Rowsley South, and operated ex-industrial diesels and carriages similar to the Golden Valley light railway at the Midland Railway Centre.

Preceding station	Heritage railways	Following station
Terminus	Derbyshire Dales Narrow Gauge Railway	Terminus
