= Parkside Middle School, Cramlington =

Parkside Middle School
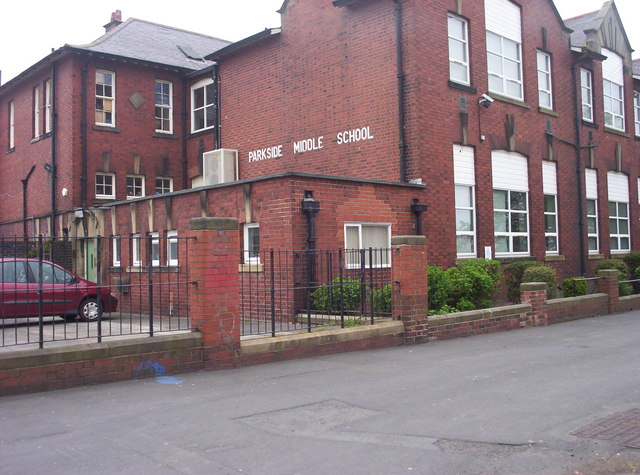

Location
- Village Road; Cramlington, Northumberland, NE23 1DN; England; 55.0912°N 1.5863°W

Information
- Type: Middle school
- Motto: Strive to Achieve
- Established: 1909
- Closed: 2008
- Local authority: Northumberland
- Department for Education URN: 122330 Tables
- Ofsted: Reports
- Head teacher: Ronald Stewart (1996–2008)
- Gender: Mixed
- Age: 9 to 13
- Enrolment: 465 in 2008
- Houses: Arcot (Blue), Blagdon (Red), Hastings (Yellow), Plessey (Green)
- Colours: Yellow, grey and blue

Parkside Middle School was a school in Cramlington, United Kingdom from its foundation in 1909 until 2008, when it closed as middle school functions in the town were transferred to Cramlington Learning Village.

== History ==
=== Construction ===
The original building was constructed in 1909 for the sum of £10,000, which was considered a significant price at the time. The former stone school, which had been used since 1853, became a parish hall. It was officially opened on 13 September 1909 by Sir Francis Blake, 1st Baronet, of Tillmouth Park, who was then the Deputy Lieutenant of Northumberland. According to the Wansbeck Telegraph, "Several hundred people assembled at Cramlington village to witness the opening...there was a rendering of Ye Mariners of England by the children... and a photographic view of the group [was] taken."

Parkside in the snow in early 2010.

It was certified as a secondary modern school, and thus children who did not make the grading requirement on the 11-Plus went there.

=== First World War ===
On 17 November 1914, the school was occupied by the British Army for use during the First World War, and thus a half-timetable was put in place. No lights were allowed in the school due to the threat of Zeppelin raids, one of which occurred on 2 April 1916 over Cramlington.

=== Between the Wars ===
During the Spanish flu epidemic in 1918, teaching staff were reduced to one member of staff and average attendance to 55% due to the outbreak. One pupil died in early 1919 from the disease. The first few years did not go well, with a focus on inspections which recorded an outbreak of scarlet fever in November 1915. The following month, the temperature was recorded at 48 °F (9 °C) inside the school.

The Prince of Wales, the future King Edward VIII visited the school in 1921. During the 1926 general strike, it was noted by an inspector that many children had inadequate footwear due to the poverty caused by their parents suffering ten days away from work.

During the Second World War, the teaching staff was reduced to only two male teachers due to conscription. In the first week of September 1939, part of the school was taken over as a military hospital and air raid shelters were built on the school fields.

=== After World War Two ===
Following the Education Act 1944, the school reopened fully on 9 April 1945 as Cramlington Modern School.

In 1977, it was considered significant to record in the logs that the school was renting a video recorder for the first time.

=== Closure ===
The school was closed on 21 July 2008 and its pupils transferred to Cramlington Learning Village, ending a 99-year history of education at the same site. The schools records were forwarded to the National Archives for safe keeping.

== Buildings and site ==
The school was located on a site to the north of the Village Road, behind the Blagdon Arms and Primitive Methodist Chapel.

In addition to the original two-floor building, the Main Hall, gymnasium, and a number of other classrooms were later added to the west and south of the main block, enclosing a paved area known as the quadrangle.

Covered walkways between the newer buildings and the original block were later enclosed with outer walls to protect the children from the weather. In the early 1990s, a Year 5 block was constructed to the far west of the site, replacing huts that had stood on the playing fields for the previous few decades.

Playing fields and a tennis court with wire net fence around the perimeter occupied the land between the school buildings and the B1326 Northumbrian Road. The school's main playing field was located to the east of the main site, across the cycle track. Air raid shelters once occupied the side of the field nearest the cycle track.

The caretaker's house stood immediately to the north of the Blagdon Arms pub.

The buildings were demolished during the Summer of 2014, in preparation for the redevelopment of the site into a housing estate of 34 homes by builder Taylor Wimpey between 2014 and 2016. Two streets are to be built on the site: School Close and Blake Drive, the latter named for Sir Francis Blake.

== Headteachers ==
- Thomas Wormwell, 1 September 1909 – 6 January 1913
- George Davison, 6 January 1913 – 18 September 1937, died in office
- Isaac Baty, 25 April 1938 – 24 March 1961
- William Gowrie, 2 September 1964 – 31 March 1982
- John Elliott, 26 April 1982 – 20 December 1995
- Ronald Stewart, 1 April 1996 – 21 July 2008
