= Anne Scargill =

British political activist (1941–2025)

Anne Harper
- Harper at the National Union of Mineworkers' headquarters in 2014
- Born: Anne Harper; 12 October 1941; Barnsley
- Died: 10 April 2025 (aged 83)
- Movement: Women Against Pit Closures
- Spouse: Arthur Scargill (m. 1961–2001)

Anne Harper (12 October 1941 – 10 April 2025), commonly known by her married name Anne Scargill, was a British community organiser, activist and co-founder of the National Women Against Pit Closures (NWAPC) movement from Barnsley, South Yorkshire. She was politically active during the 1984–85 miners' strike as an activist, community organiser and wife of the then President of the National Union of Mineworkers (NUM), Arthur Scargill.

Harper was integral to community organisation and activism efforts by women to provide welfare within mining communities and to prevent pit closures during the 1984–1985 miners' strike, which was a landmark event in the history of the British labour movement. She remained active through political activism and media appearances during the 1990s. In 2018, Harper was the subject of a play about her life, Queens of the Coal Age, written by Maxine Peake and directed by Bryony Shanahan.

She was best known for her role in the NWAPC movement, her prominence as a public speaker during the 1984–1985 miners' strike and due to her marriage to Scargill. More recently, Harper has been viewed as a pioneer of feminist community activism and discourse by scholars and within the media and arts.

== Early life and marriage to Arthur Scargill ==
Anne Harper was born in Barnsley, West Riding of Yorkshire, on 12 October 1941, third of four children of Elliot Harper, a miner who had a second job as a chimney sweep, and was also a member of the Trade Union branch committee at Woolley Colliery, and Harriet, née Hardy, a former cook.

Harper married Arthur Scargill, who was also an elected member of the Trade Union branch committee at Woolley Colliery, at Gawber Parish Church on 16 September 1961. In 1962 the couple had a daughter together, Margaret Scargill, who is now a practising general practitioner. For many years from the 1960s, Harper worked as a comptometer operator at the Barnsley Co-operative Society. During this time Harper was a member of the Labour Party, but not particularly politically active. She later stated that before the 1984 strike she led "a very, very boring life" and "was really at a bit of a loose end".

Once Scargill was elected as President of the National Union of Mineworkers in 1981, Harper frequently accompanied him to rallies and picket lines to protest against the planned downsizing of the coal industry in Britain, especially in response to economic and social impact of this on individuals and communities. She travelled around the UK to picket lines, protests and political conferences under the remit of trade unionism and the political organisation of miners. Harper and Scargill both spoke at these events. Although Scargill's biographers claim that Harper eschewed direct involvement in politics and attended pickets in an auxiliary role as Scargill's spouse, Stead has documented her work as a political activist and community organiser.

In 1996, she was made redundant from her job at the Co-operative Society. As the society advertised for 50 more workers, she brought an action at an industrial tribunal which reinstated her, and she worked there until retirement.

The couple separated in 1998 and divorced in 2001. After the divorce Harper reverted to her maiden name from Anne Scargill.

== Political, community organisation and activism activities ==
During the 1984–1985 miners' strike, Anne Harper led women in picketing at collieries that were threatened with closure. Along with Lyn Hathaway, Liz Hollis and Audrey Moor, who was an organiser from the Nottinghamshire Women's Support Group, Harper often appeared at picket lines to support the miners' cause. Local authorities and even the miners themselves, some of whom felt that women were out of place at these scenes, objected to the women's presence at picket lines. The four women were arrested and brought before a magistrate's court in Nottinghamshire for their picketing activities at Silverhill Colliery, which the prosecution claimed had caused an obstruction. They were ultimately cleared of this charge in October 1984, however the women were banned from picketing Nottinghamshire. Harper claimed she was subject to intimidation tactics and rough treatment, including being strip-searched, in 14-hours of police custody during this incident.

Harper continued to appear at picket lines throughout the 1984–1985 strike and to speak at rallies and protests against pit closures. Following this incident, the NUM recognised that the presence female protesters could ameliorate the public image of the strike and held a meeting to discuss a possible new NWAPC office at the NUM headquarters in Sheffield. As contentions amongst supporters of the strike towards the NUM grew, this association became increasingly controversial within the NWAPC.

At this time Harper also began community-based activism activities that centred on fund raising and protests that became NWAPC movement. In November 1984, Harper launched the striking miners' Christmas appeal, which was highly successful in terms of fundraising to cover welfare and legal costs for striking miners and their families. Mr John Paul Getty Jr., philanthropist and son of a renowned oil magnate, donated £100,000 to the campaign the week after it was launched.

=== Women Against Pit Closures ===
Harper founded the Barnsley Women Against Pit Closures group along with other local women, which was the first such group in what became a national movement. These groups brought together women from the coalfields to fund-raise for striking miners and their families, organise rallies and picketing activities to draw national and international attention, and eventually to engage with national and trade union politics. The Barnsley group was formed when local women published an advertisement in a local paper, the Barnsley Chronicle, for a meeting to decide how to best support local striking miners. This led to the first, very well attended, meeting of the group and to a national, all-women rally through Barnsley twenty days later on 12 May 1984. The march was attended by an estimated 10,000 women. On 11 August 1983 the group organised a protest march through London that an estimated 23,000 people joined, including working class women from around the UK and female trade unionists.

Participants in the NWAPC movement went to Belgium, Holland and France on fund-raising trips and to speak to on trade unionists platforms about the UK miners' strike. In the early days of the Barnsley group, women also began their organisational efforts with food kitchens that became community hubs and a point of first contact for women who went on to join the group. Women who ran the food kitchen also went on fund-raising trips to neighbouring towns and cities to help finance these initiatives. Over the course of the miners' strike, Harper and other women in the Barnsley group received a growing number of invitations to speak at other support groups nationwide.

The broader support group movement was particularly strong in Wales, where there were 106 groups that were organised from Cardiff, and resulted from exchanges at the first National Women Against Pit Closures conference held at the Northern College in Barnsley on 22 July 1984. Later that year, on 10 and 11 November, the National Women's Organisation was formed at a national conference of women's action groups. This splinter group within the NWAPC movement aimed to campaign for better education and political representation for working-class women; to develop ties with the NUM and support this organisation in its goals for and beyond the miners' strike to prevent pit closures and promote welfare through education and health in mining communities. The group also set out with a published plan to campaign for economic stability and peace within these communities.

=== 1992–1993: Mine occupations ===
In 1992, Michael Heseltine, the Conservative government's President of the Board of Trade, announced the closure of Markham Main Colliery at Armthorpe near Doncaster, South Yorkshire. Markham Main Colliery was the last to return to work at the end of the 1984–1985 miners' strike and one of thirty-one pits earmarked for closure by Heseltine that year. Harper along with other women from the NWAPC movement occupied the mine after the announcement of closure in October 1992; this led Heseltine to reconsider closure of the pit later in 1992. It was eventually shut in 1996. This incident was replicated at Houghton Main Colliery where members of the NWAPC campaign established a camp to protest the suggested closure of the mine. Following the occupation at Armthorpe, the same group of women attempted to occupy the mine at Grimethorpe, South Yorkshire, but could not gain access.

On 9 April 1993, Harper and three other members of Women Against Pit Closures entered Parkside Colliery, Newton-le-Willows, where they remained 2,000 feet below ground for four nights over the Easter weekend. Parkside was the last operational colliery in Lancashire at the time and was ultimately closed the same year. The women joined a group of teachers on an underground visit to the colliery in order to pass through security. Between fifteen and twenty protesters down the mine lived on a diet of water and sandwiches that the management sent down to them, and claimed that they did not sleep because the management kicked their feet to stop them from resting. The occupation at Parkside was the subject of press attention, as TV cameras were at the surface when Harper and the other women emerged. The Press Association published a profile of Harper following the incident.

The Women Against Pit Closures took the idea of camping outside mines from protesters at Greenham Common Women's Peace Camp whom they met in 1992 and the suggestion to occupy the pits came from a woman from Doncaster at this meeting, although the Markham Main Colliery occupation preceded this.

== Later life and death ==
Harper was a member of the Anti-Fascist League. She also spoke publicly about the development female activism during the period of the 1984–85 miners' strike and the following decades. In an interview with Emma Barnett for the BBC in 2018, Harper summarised the defining spirit of the miners' strike amongst women in the support group movement: "we are women, we are strong and we are fighting for our rights". She reflected on gender relations during the 1980s in the same interview: "they [the miners] had to have their dinner on the table when they came in and they were really male chauvinists". Recent scholarship has problematised the autonomy of NWAPC groups, the relation of the movement to the male-led NUM and to Arthur Scargill at the level of day-to-day operations. A 2018 play, Queens of the Coal Age, rehabilitated the role of female activists in the miners' strike and community welfare action during and after this period. Harper is one of the women whose life is narrated in the production. Scholarship has also examined the relation between the reality and representations of the political identity of Anne Harper and other active members of the NWAPC in the media.

Harper died on 10 April 2025, at the age of 83.
