= May 1919 =

Month in 1919

<<	May 1919					>>
Su	Mo	Tu	We	Th	Fr	Sa
				1	2	3
4	5	6	7	8	9	10
11	12	13	14	15	16	17
18	19	20	21	22	23	24
25	26	27	28	29	30	31

The following events occurred in May 1919:

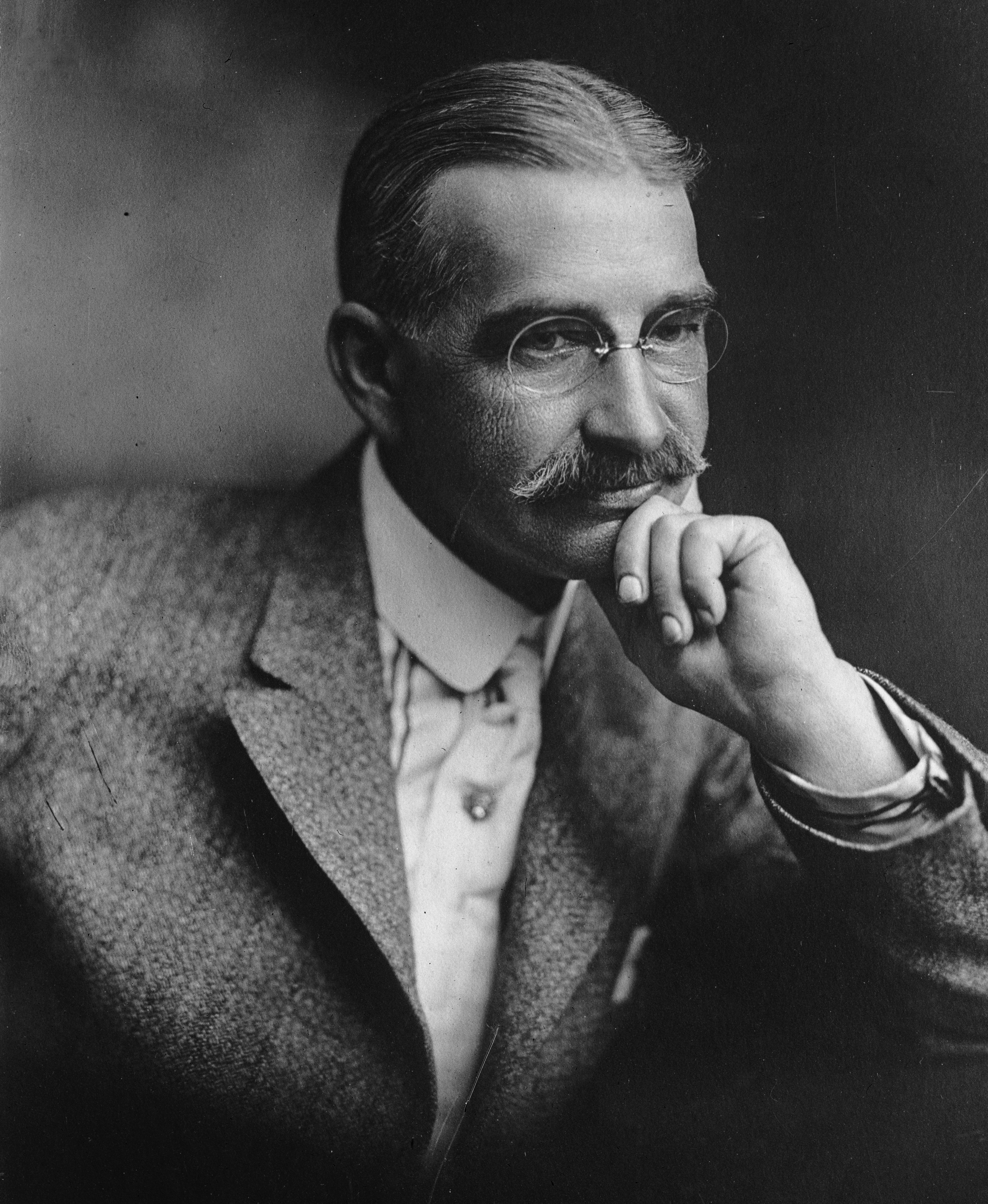
Best-selling American children's writer L. Frank Baum, author of The Wizard of Oz series, dies in Los Angeles.

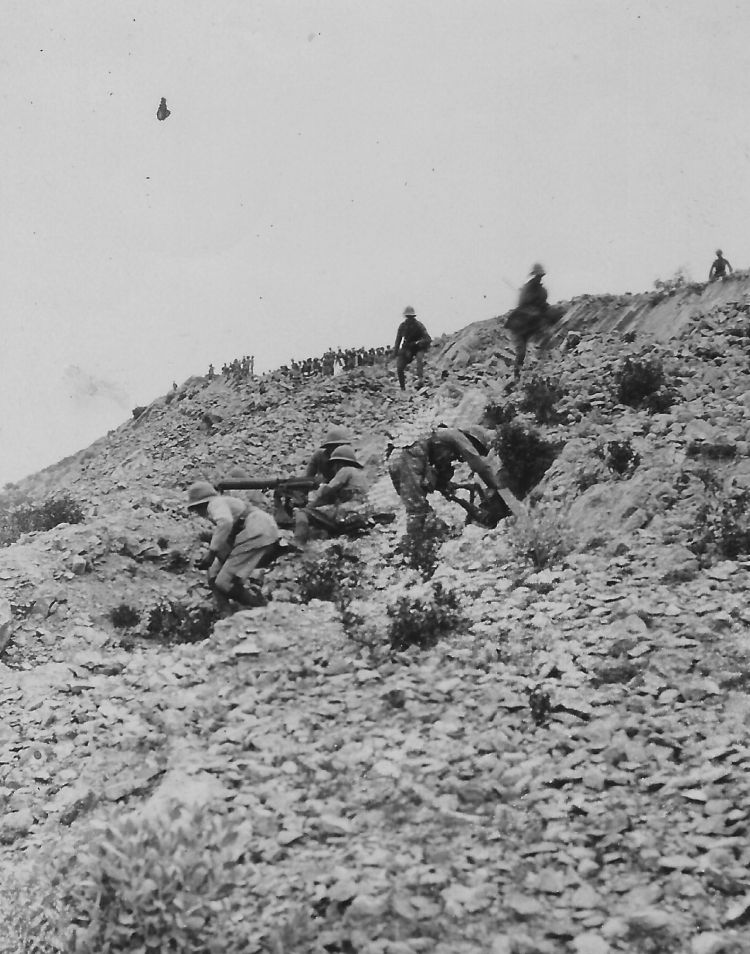
Soldiers in action at Kohat during the Third Anglo-Afghan War.

== May 1, 1919 (Thursday) ==
- The German Freikorps broke through German Soviet defenses around Munich, then the capital of the Bavarian Soviet Republic, and began capturing the city street by street.
- Riots broke out in Cleveland during a parade in the Public Square that was organized by American socialist leader C. E. Ruthenberg to protest against the imprisonment of labor leader Eugene V. Debs. While exact causes of the initial violence were disputed, the riots spread and resulted in two people killed, 40 injured, and 116 arrested.
- The 45th Australian Battalion was disbanded.
- The New Order was established in Turin by politicians Antonio Gramsci, Angelo Tasca and Palmiro Togliatti as the inner circle of the Italian Socialist Party. The group were admirers of the Russian Revolution and strongly supported the immediate creation of soviet councils in Italy.
- The Janesville Assembly Plant began producing the Samson Tractor for General Motors in Janesville, Wisconsin.
- Several rail stations were reopened in England after being closed down during World War I, including stations in south London and Selsdon.
- Football and sports clubs were established in the following cities:
  - Bauru was established in Bauru, Brazil as Luzitana
  - Radium in Mococa, Brazil through the merger of two local clubs
  - Sports club Express in Fevik, Norway with programs in football, handball, basketball, floorball, track and field, and gymnastics
- Born:
  - Mohammed Karim Lamrani, Moroccan state leader, 7th Prime Minister of Morocco; in Fez, Protectorate of Morocco (present-day Morocco) (d. 2018)
  - Lance Barnard, Australian politician, cabinet minister for the Gough Whitlam administration; in Launceston, Tasmania, Australia (d. 1997)
  - Dan O'Herlihy, Irish actor, best known for his film roles in Robinson Crusoe, Fail Safe and RoboCop; in Wexford, Ireland (d. 2005)
  - Manna Dey, Indian singer, vocalist for many Bollywood films including Two bighas of land, recipient of the Padma Shri; as Prabodh Chandra Dey, in Calcutta, British India (present-day Kolkata, India) (d. 2013)

== May 2, 1919 (Friday) ==
- Weimar Republic troops and the Freikorps occupied Munich and crushed remaining German Soviet resistance after two days of intense street fighting. In total, 606 people were killed including 335 civilians. German forces also killed several Soviet leaders, including Gustav Landauer, and arrested Eugen Leviné, president of the Bavarian Soviet Republic.

== May 3, 1919 (Saturday) ==
- Poland marked the first national holiday for the country, commemorating the day when the 1791 Constitution was signed, the second oldest constitution created in Europe.
- Third Anglo-Afghan War – Afghan forces marched through the Khyber Pass between Afghanistan and British India and captured Bagh, a border town that provided much of the water for the larger town of Landi Kotal where two companies of the British Indian Army were garrisoned, initiating a third war between the country and the British Empire.
- White women were granted the right to vote in municipal elections in Atlanta,Georgia, USA .
- The National Association of Negro Musicians was established in Washington, D.C. under the leadership of Nora Holt and Henry Grant.
- The British weekly film magazine Picture Show published its first issue. It was the longest-running British film magazine until its final publication in 1960.
- Born:
  - Pete Seeger, American folk singer, known for his folk hits "Where Have All the Flowers Gone?", "If I Had a Hammer" and "Turn! Turn! Turn!"; in New York City, United States (d. 2014)
  - John Cullen Murphy, American comic book artist, best known for his work on the comic strip Prince Valiant; in New York City, United States (d. 2004)

== May 4, 1919 (Sunday) ==
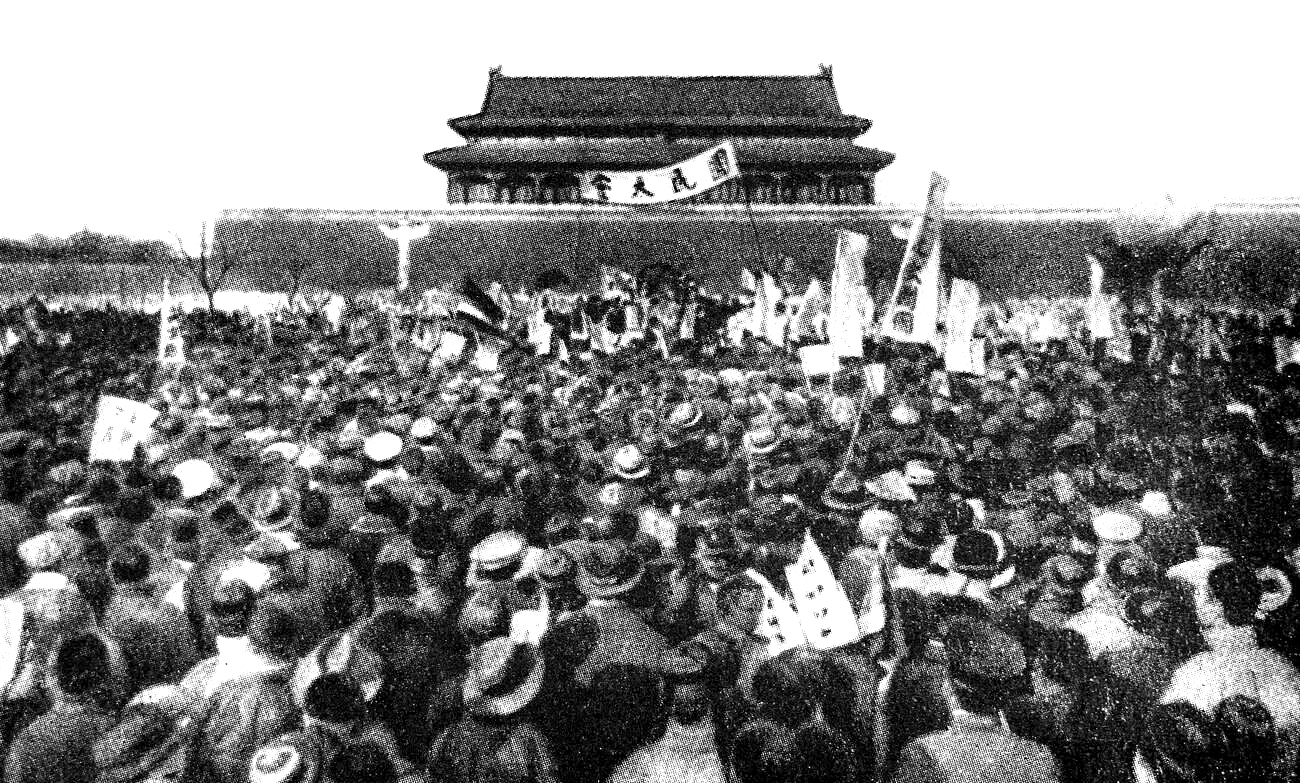
Thousands of students in Beijing protest Japan gaining territory in China during Paris Peace Conference.

- The May Fourth Movement began when 4,000 students from 13 local universities throughout Beijing gathered in Tiananmen to protest against the decision at the Paris Peace Conference to transfer former German concessions in Jiaozhou Bay to Japan rather than return sovereign authority to China.
- Russian Civil War – The Fifth Red Army captured Buguruslan, forcing White Russian forces to retreat to Bugulma, Russia.
- A riot broke out in Fremantle, Australia when strikers for the Waterside Workers' Federation of Australia attempted to stop a rival union from crossing the picket line to unload a ship in port. During the violence, union worker Tom Edwards was struck in the head by a police baton and died from his injury days later.
- The League of Red Cross Societies was founded in Paris.
- Lucina C. Broadwell, a 29-year-old mother of three in Barre, Vermont, was found in the early morning, murdered in what was considered "one of the most horrendous crimes to take place in Vermont up to that time." Her body was naked except for shoes and stockings, and an autopsy found she had been strangled. Lucina was buried in Johnson, Vermont, on May 7, 1919.
- The comic strip Harold Teen, created by Carl Ed, was first published in the Chicago Tribune, becoming the first cartoon to feature an adolescent as the main character.
- Born: Dory Funk, American wrestler, father of Dory Funk Jr. and Terry Funk, promoter for Western States Sports; as Dorrance Wilhelm Funk, in Hammond, Indiana, United States (d. 1973)
- Died: Milan Rastislav Štefánik, 38, Slovak military officer, commander of the Czechoslovak Legion during World War I, recipient of the Legion of Honour; killed in a plane crash (b. 1880)

== May 5, 1919 (Monday) ==
- The May Fourth Movement spread to other cities in China as student groups joined in solidarity with their Beijing counterparts who had been arrested and jailed for anti-imperialism protests the previous day in Tiananmen.
- The Crimean Socialist Soviet Republic was established in Simferopol, Crimea with Vladimir Lenin's brother Dmitry Ilyich Ulyanov as chairman.
- The National Conference on Lynching was held at Carnegie Hall in New York City, with the goal of pressuring United States Congress to pass the Dyer Anti-Lynching Bill.
- The 51st Australian Battalion was disbanded.
- The 332nd Infantry Regiment of the United States Army was disbanded.
- The Ottoman Empire disbanded the Renewal Party following the dissolving of parliament.
- German sailing ship SMS Leipzig capsized in Wilhelmshaven, Germany. She was raised and scrapped in 1921.
- The Taiwan Governor-General Railway completed extended the Yilan line in Yilan County, Taiwan, adding Nuannuan, Sijiaoting and Ruifang stations to the rail line.
- Several rail stations were reopened in Great Britain after being closed down during World War I, including stations in Llong, Wales, and Cambridge Heath , Carpenders Park, Coborn, Garston, Kempston Hardwick, Kempston Elstow, Mochdre, Oxford Road, and Stewartby in England.
- The smelter stack for Anaconda Copper went into operation in Anaconda, Montana. After operations discontinued, the structure was preserved and added to the National Register of Historic Places in 1987. At an overall height of about 585 feet (178.3 m), it remains the tallest surviving masonry structure in the world.
- Born:
  - Georgios Papadopoulos, Greek state leader, second Prime Minister of Greece during the Greek junta, and 8th President of Greece; in Elaiochori, Achaea, Kingdom of Greece (present-day Greece) (d. 1999)
  - Séamus Ennis, Irish folk singer, promoter of the traditional Irish uilleann pipes, co-founder of the Na Píobairí Uilleann; in Finglas, Dublin, Ireland (d. 1982)
  - Tony Canadeo, American football player, halfback for the Green Bay Packers; in Chicago, United States
  - Bob Westfall, American football player, fullback for the Detroit Lions from 1944 to 1947; in Hamtramck, Michigan, United States (d. 1980)
- Died: Charles W. Fisher, 52, Canadian politician, first Speaker of the Legislative Assembly of Alberta; died of influenza (b. 1866)

== May 6, 1919 (Tuesday) ==
- Third Anglo-Afghan War – The United Kingdom formally declared war on Afghanistan.
- The Bavarian Soviet Republic was officially dissolved in Munich.
- Meredith P. Snyder defeated incumbent Frederic T. Woodman during city elections to become the 23rd mayor of Los Angeles.
- The Australian Flying Corps disbanded the squadron No. 2.
- L. Frank Baum, 62, the creator of The Wizard of Oz series, died in Los Angeles after suffering a stroke the previous day. It was reported his last words to his wife Maude were "Now we can cross the Shifting Sands," a reference to the impenetrable desert that surrounded the mythical Land of Oz he created through 12 novels (two more were published after his death).
- The borough of Plainsboro Township, New Jersey, was established.
- Born: John Edwin Ashley Williams, Australian air force officer, commander of No. 450 Squadron during World War II, member of the escape team from the German POW camp Stalag Luft III; in Wellington, New Zealand (d. 1944, executed)

== May 7, 1919 (Wednesday) ==
- At the Paris Peace Conference, the United Kingdom was awarded most of German East Africa, over strenuous objections from Belgium.
- A bombing at the police station in Blankenberge, West Flanders, Belgium, killed 2 police officers. The bombing remains unsolved.
- The Victorias Milling Company, one of the largest sugar manufacturers in Asia, was established in Victorias, Philippines.
- The University in Poznań was established in Poznań, Greater Poland, although an academic history going as far back as 1611 is attributed to it. It has carried the name of Polish poet Adam Mickiewicz since 1955.
- The Geological Museum of the State Geological Institute was opened in Warsaw.
- The St. Joseph Cathedral was dedicated in Sioux Falls, South Dakota. It was registered in the National Register of Historic Places in 1974.
- Born: Eva Perón, Argentine philanthropist, First Lady of Argentina from 1946 to 1952, wife of Argentine President Juan Perón, president of the Eva Perón Foundation; as María Eva Duarte, in Los Toldos, Argentina (d. 1952)

== May 8, 1919 (Thursday) ==
- The provisional government in Estonia officially resigned, allowing the first democratically elected government to take control of the country, with Otto Strandman as the first Prime Minister of Estonia.
- The constitution of Luxembourg was amended to extend universal suffrage to all citizens over age 21, regardless of sex. This amendment came into force on May 15.
- Third Anglo-Afghan War – A planned uprising in Peshawar, British India to coincide with the Afghan invasion was quashed after British authorities threatened to cut off the local water supply to citizens.
- Australian journalist Edward George Honey, under the pen name Warren Foster, proposed the idea of a moment of silence to commemorate the armistice of World War I in a letter to The Evening News: "Five little minutes only. Five silent minutes of national remembrance. A very sacred intercession. Communion with the Glorious Dead who won us peace, and from the communion new strength, hope and faith in the morrow."
- United States Coast Guard pilots Elmer Fowler Stone and Walter Hinton, under the command of Albert Cushing Read of the United States Navy, took off from the Rockaway naval station at Long Island, New York in a Curtiss flying boat in the first attempted crossing of the Atlantic by air.
- About 1,100 members of the United States Armed Forces stateside convened in St. Louis for the second American Legion caucus, but general disorganization at the conference lead to little being accomplished.
- The United States Marine Corps established the Marine Corps Expeditionary Ribbon for recognition of service both domestic and abroad with the Corps. U.S. President Warren G. Harding authorized the full-sized medal in 1921.
- The first hardcover edition of the short story cycle Winesburg, Ohio by American author Sherwood Anderson was published by B. W. Huebsch.
- Born:
  - Lex Barker, American film actor, 10th actor to portray Tarzan in movies; in Rye, New York, United States (d. 1973)
  - Leon Festinger, American psychologist, developed the concepts of cognitive dissonance and social comparison theory; in New York City, United States (d. 1989)
  - Aharon Remez, Israeli air force officer, second commander of the Israeli Air Force; in Tel Aviv, Mandatory Palestine (present-day Israel) (d. 1994)
- Died: LaMarcus Adna Thompson, 71, American entrepreneur, designer of the modern roller coaster (b. 1848)

== May 9, 1919 (Friday) ==
- Third Anglo-Afghan War – A British force attempted to recapture the border Indian Bagh from the Afghans but failed when it was split up to protect its flanks.
- Women in Belgium who were widows or single mothers of servicemen that were either killed in action, taken prisoner by the enemy, or were involved in the resistance movement were allowed to vote and run for office.
- The 49th Australian Battalion was disbanded.
- The Lilleaker tramline between Oslo and Skøyen, Norway was opened to the public, with stations Lilleaker, Sollerud, Furulund, Ullern, Abbediengen, and Hoff serving the line.
- The Yiddish language Jewish Newspaper began publication in Vilna, Lithuania but closed within eight months.
- Born: Arthur English, British actor, best known for his comedic roles in the television series Are You Being Served? and In Sickness and in Health; in Aldershot, England (d. 1995)
- Died:
  - Juan Isidro Jimenes, 72, Dominican state leader, 28th President of the Dominican Republic (b. 1846)
  - James Reese Europe, 39, American jazz musician, promoter of ragtime and early jazz music; died of stab wounds (b. 1881)

== May 10, 1919 (Saturday) ==
- A race riot in Charleston, South Carolina resulted in the deaths of three black men, instigating weeks of racial violence known as the Red Summer across the United States.
- The 26th Infantry Division of the British Army was disbanded.
- Thoroughbred racehorse Sir Barton, ridden by Johnny Loftus, won the 45th running of the Kentucky Derby with a winning time of 2:03.4 minutes.
- English rugby league team Rochdale Hornets defeated Oldham 22–0 at the first Lancashire Cup held since the end of World War I, in front of a crowd of 18,617 spectators at The Willows in Salford, England.
- A surface extension of the IND Culver Line opened, including stations Avenue U and Avenue X in New York City. The rest of the line to Coney Island would be completed in 1920.
- The Freeman began publication in Cebu City, Philippines, the first daily newspaper for the city.
- Born:
  - Ella Grasso, American politician, 83rd Governor of Connecticut, first woman elected as governor of Connecticut; in Windsor Locks, Connecticut, United States (d. 1981)
  - Daniel Bell, American sociologist, leading proponent of post-industrialism, author of The End of Ideology; in New York City, United States (d. 2011)
  - Anthony Chenevix-Trench, British educator, headmaster for Bradfield College, Eton College, and Fettes College; in Kasauli, British India (present-day India) (d. 1979)
- Died:
  - Ferdinando Fontana, 69, Italian poet, known for his collaborations with Giacomo Puccini on the operas Le Villi and Edgar (b. 1850)
  - Perry Owens, 66, American law enforcer, key figure in the Pleasant Valley War in Arizona Territory from 1882 to 1892; died of Bright's disease (b. 1852)

== May 11, 1919 (Sunday) ==
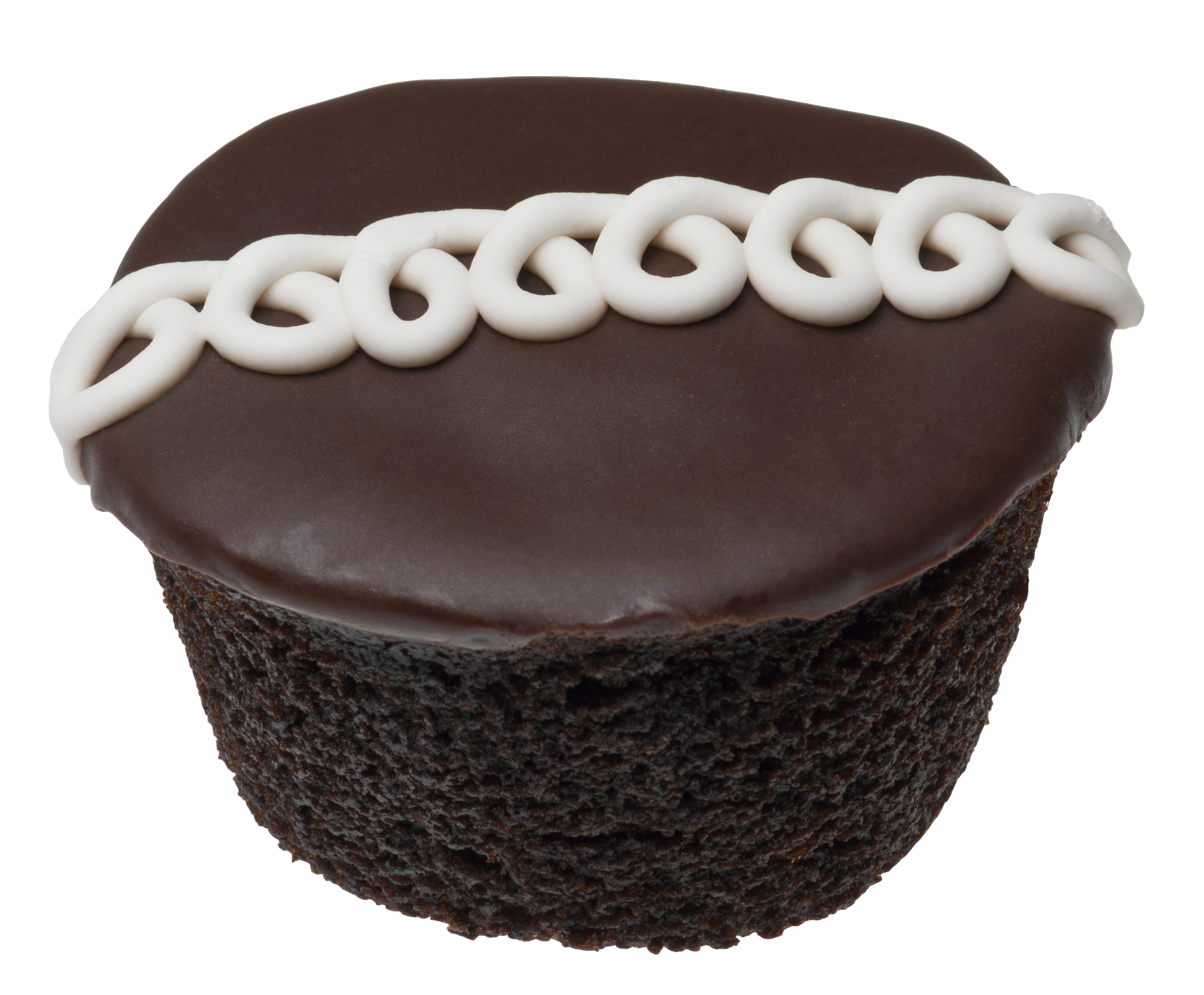
Hostess CupCake

- Portugal held new elections less than a year after the previous ones, with the Democratic Party that had boycotted in the previous year returning to win the majority of the seats in both the House of Representatives and the Senate.
- Third Anglo-Afghan War – Reinforced with a second division, the British were able to recapture the Indian border town of Bagh in their second attack against the Afghans and force them to retreat over the border. The Afghans suffered 400 casualties, including 100 killed, while the British recorded eight killed and 31 wounded.
- The Bessarabian Soviet Socialist Republic was proclaimed in Odessa and established in Tiraspol (now part of Moldova) as an autonomous part of Soviet Russia, even though neither city was part of the historical Bessarabia. The actual region had merged with Romania in 1918 but was never recognized by the Russian Soviet government. Eventually, the soviet republic in exile was dissolved in September.
- Mary Pickford starred in the film comedy-drama Daddy-Long-Legs, directed by Marshall Neilan and adapted from the novel of the same name by Jean Webster. It grossed $1.2 million to become the third biggest box office hit of the year.
- The first Hostess CupCake was sold by Taggart Bakery as the Chocolate Cup Cake, often in pairs for five cents. In 1925, the Continental Baking Company bought out Taggaret Bakery and the dessert became associated with the Hostess brand.
- The football club UDI '19 was established in Uden, Netherlands.
- Born: Charles F. Widdecke, American marine officer, commander of the 22nd Marine Regiment during World War II and the 1st Marine Division during the Vietnam War, two-time recipient of the Legion of Merit, Navy Distinguished Service Medal, Navy Cross, and Silver Star; in Bryan, Texas, United States (d. 1973)
- Died: Watanabe Kunitake, 72, Japanese politician, cabinet minister for the Itō Hirobumi administration (b. 1846)

== May 12, 1919 (Monday) ==
- Toowoomba State High School was established in Toowoomba, Queensland, Australia.
- The 4th Far Eastern Championship Games were hosted in Manila.
- The Second International Women's Congress for Peace and Freedom in Zürich denounced the final terms for peace from the Paris Peace Conference and renamed their organization the Women's International League for Peace and Freedom.
- Scottish archaeologist Alexander Ormiston Curle discovered a hoard of over 53 pounds (24 kg) of Roman silver at Traprain Law near Haddington, East Lothian, Scotland.
- The Ex-Servicemen's Welfare Society was established to provide treatment for former British soldiers still suffering from mental and physical effects of combat in World War I.
- The Pip, Squeak and Wilfred comic strip debuted in the Daily Mirror.
- An early-morning fire destroyed the shipping department of the Rockwood & Company chocolate factory in Brooklyn, New York City, causing over $75,000 in damage and sending a flood of molten chocolate and butter out into the streets.
- The United States Army Air Service disbanded the 5th Pursuit Group following the occupation of the Rhineland.
- Born: Peter Cochrane, British army officer, member of the 11th Indian Infantry Brigade during World War II, recipient of the Distinguished Service Order, Military Cross and Croix de Guerre; as James Aikman Cochrane, in Glasgow, Scotland (d. 2015)
- Died: D. M. Canright, 78, American theologian, critic of the Seventh-day Adventist Church (b. 1840)

== May 13, 1919 (Tuesday) ==
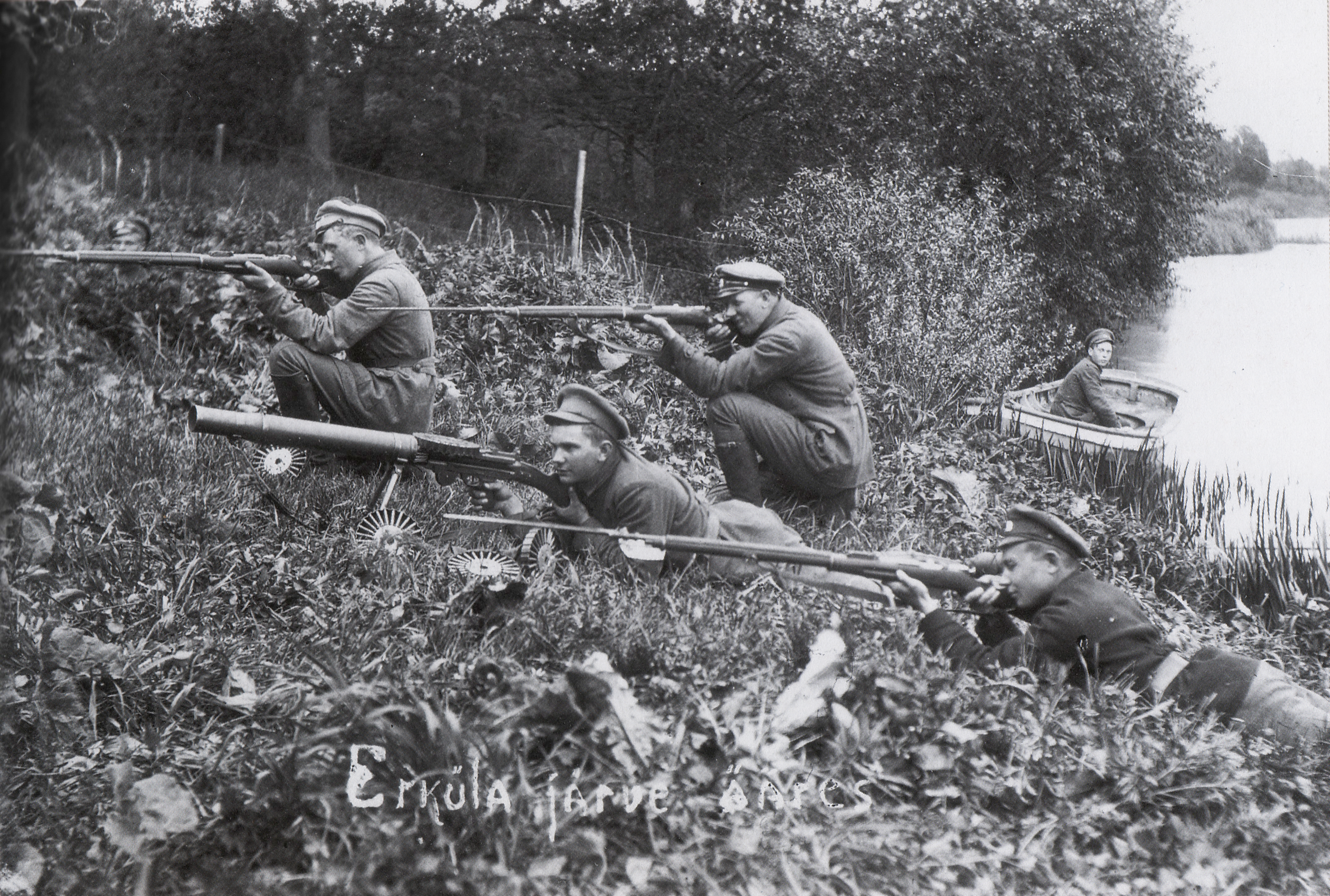
Estonian soldiers fight in Latvia during the Estonian War of Independence.

- Estonian War of Independence – The Estonian Army joined forces with the White Russians at Narva, Estonia to push the Soviet front back over the border into Russia. Counterattacks by the Seventh Red Army stabilized the front.
- Russian Civil War – The Fifth Red Army captured Bugulma, Russia.
- Third Anglo-Afghan War – The British seized control of the Khyber Pass.
- Two Royal Irish Constabulary members were killed and Irish Republican Army volunteers Dan Breen and Seán Treacy were wounded while rescuing compatriot Seán Hogan from a guarded train carriage at Knocklong, County Limerick, Ireland.
- The 3rd Aero Squadron of the United States Army Air Service was reformed for service in the Philippines.
- The French Rugby Federation was established.
- D. W. Griffith's first film to be released by United Artists, Broken Blossoms, premiered in New York City. Starring Lillian Gish, the film made $600,000 to become the eighth highest-grossing film of the year.
- Died: Helen Hyde, 51, American artist, known for her Japanese-influenced etching work including Moonlight on the Viga Canal (b. 1868)

== May 14, 1919 (Wednesday) ==
- Thoroughbred racehorse Sir Barton, ridden by Johnny Loftus, won the 44th running of the Preakness Stakes with a winning time of 1:53 minutes.
- Aberystwyth University established the world's first chair in international relations, endowed by David Davies and his sisters in honor of Woodrow Wilson, with Alfred Eckhard Zimmern as first professor.
- The University of Concepción was established in Concepción, Chile, the third oldest post-secondary educational institution in the country.
- The Australian Imperial Force cricket tour began in Attleborough, England against the Lionel Robinson's team. The match was a draw with the Australian team requiring nine runs to win and with one wicket left. The match was, unusually, a twelve aside game but is nevertheless counted as "first class".
- Died:
  - Henry J. Heinz, 74, American business leader, founder of Heinz; died of pneumonia (b. 1844)
  - Ernest Failloubaz, 26, Swiss aviator, who performed the first flight in Switzerland; died of tuberculosis (b. 1892)

== May 15, 1919 (Thursday) ==
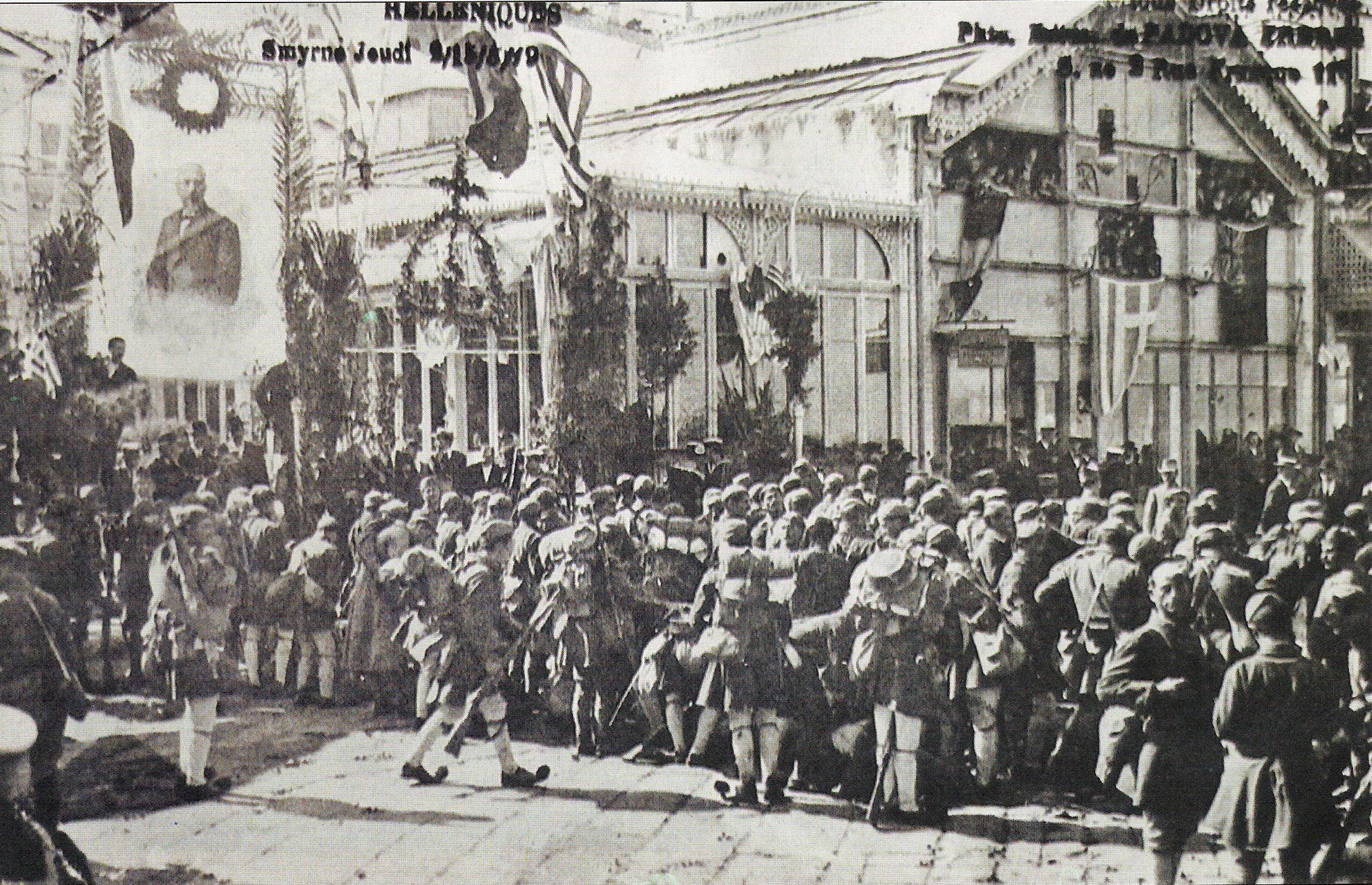
Greek troops land Smyrna, Turkey.

- Greek landing at Smyrna – The Hellenic Army landed at Smyrna assisted by the Royal Navy to begin occupation of Smyrna (now İzmir, Turkey).
- The Mughan Soviet Republic was established in Baku, Azerbaijan but dissolved within a month.
- Winnipeg general strike – Around 30,000 workers in Winnipeg launched a general strike for better wages and working conditions. Sympathetic strikes later spread to other Canadian cities including Edmonton, Calgary, Vancouver, and Amherst, Nova Scotia.
- Single women over age 20 were given the right to vote in local elections on the Isle of Jersey.
- Arrests were made in the murder of Lucina C. Broadwell of Barre, Vermont. George Long and Isabelle Parker were charged with murder after it was revealed Long had been having an affair with Broadwell while Parker, being Long's landlord, had participated in covering it up. The resulting trial in October lead to a conviction of murder in the second degree for Long and a reduced charge of "conducting a house of ill fame" for Parker. Long was sentenced to life imprisonment while Parker received two and half years. She died in prison two years later.
- The U.S. Navy blimp C-5 completed a pioneering overnight flight from its base at Cape May, New Jersey, to St. John's, becoming the first airship to visit the Newfoundland port. The navy planned for C-5 to become the first airship to fly across the Atlantic Ocean. However, shortly after arriving, C-5 broke her mooring lines during high winds and drifted out unmanned into the ocean where she crashed in the evening 85 miles from St. John's. Recovered by a British ship, C-5 never flew again.
- The 1st, 2nd, 3rd, 4th and 5th Australian Pioneer Battalions were disbanded.
- The Royal Air Force disbanded squadron No. 240 at RAF Calshot, Southampton Water, England.
- Football and sports clubs were established in the follow cities: Harvestehuder through a merger of two other sports clubs in Hamburg, with programs in tennis and field hockey, the Jewish sports club Maccabi București in Bucharest, Speyer in Speyer, Germany, and Brønshøj in Brønshøj, Denmark.
- Born:
  - Eugenia Charles, Dominican state leader, second Prime Minister of Dominica; in Pointe Michel, Dominica (d. 2005)
  - Buck McNair, Canadian air force officer, commander of the No. 421 and No. 416 Squadrons during World War II, recipient of the Distinguished Service Order, Distinguished Flying Cross, Legion of Honour and Croix de Guerre; as Robert Wendell McNair, in Springfield, Nova Scotia, Canada (d. 1971)
- Died: Aaron Aaronsohn, 42, Romanian-born Palestinian botanist, first to identify emmer, the first wheat grain grown by primitive humans; killed in a plane crash (b. 1876)

== May 16, 1919 (Friday) ==
- Third Anglo-Afghan War – British Sikh forces attacked a force of 3,000 Afghan troops near the Khyber Pass, inflicting 600 casualties including 200 killed while suffering 22 killed and 137 wounded. The Afghans abandoned their position, losing most of their artillery pieces and machine guns.
- Around 800 ethnic Greek militia began looting and burning Turkish villages in Urla, Turkey a day after the Greek landing at Smyrna. A local Turkish militia of 120 men plus 25 regular Ottoman troops were organized to repel the attacks.
- Women in Jamaica over the age of 25 that earned income or paid taxes became eligible to vote.
- The first attempt to cross the Atlantic Ocean by airplane began when American pilots Elmer Fowler Stone and Walter Hinton, under command of Albert Cushing Read, took off from Trepassey, Newfoundland for an all-night flight to the Azores.
- The 9th Scottish Division of the British Army was disbanded.
- The Yerevan State University was established in Yerevan, Armenia, the oldest university in the country.
- Born:
  - Liberace, American music performer, popular live concert and television pianist, including the 1950s television variety program The Liberace Show; as Władziu Valentino Liberace, in West Allis, Wisconsin, United States (d. 1987)
  - John Robinson, English clergy, Bishop of Woolwich from 1959 to 1969, promoter of Liberal Christianity; in Canterbury, England (d. 1983)
- Died: Germany Schaefer, 43, American baseball player, infielder for the Chicago Cubs, Detroit Tigers, Washington Senators, New York Yankees, and Cleveland Indians from 1901 to 1918; died of tuberculosis (b. 1876)

== May 17, 1919 (Saturday) ==
- Greek troops from Smyrna, Turkey captured 25 regular Turkish troops at Urla and routed the Turkish militia to retreat into Anatolia, making it the first military action of the Greco-Turkish War.
- The first Irish Republican law court was established at Ballinrobe, County Mayo, Ireland.
- Winnipeg general strike – City prosecutor James Bowes Coyne and other public leaders formed "The Committee of One Thousand" to oppose the strike.
- American pilots Elmer Fowler Stone and Walter Hinton, under command of Albert Cushing Read, landed at Horta on Faial Island in the Azores, completing 1,200 miles (1,900 km) in 15 hours, 18 minutes since taking off from Newfoundland the day before.
- A Handley aircraft carrying T. E. Lawrence crashed at Centocelle Airport near Rome as he was making his way to Egypt. Lawrence survived with a broken shoulder place and ribs but his pilot and co-pilot were killed. During his brief hospital stay, he was visited by King Victor Emmanuel.
- A prototype of the Bohemia aircraft crashed at Pilsen, Bohemia, killing the student pilot and injuring the rear pilot instructor.
- English rugby team Huddersfield defeated Dewsbury 14–8 at the first Yorkshire Cup held since the end of World War I, in front of a crowd of 21,500 spectators at Headingley Stadium in Headingley, England.
- Weekly newspaper The Twofold Bay Magnet and South Coast and Southern Monaro Advertiser ceased publication in Monaro, New South Wales, Australia.
- The city of Williamstown was established in Victoria, Australia. It merged with Melbourne in 1994.
- Born:
  - Antonio Aguilar, Mexican singer and actor, best-selling recording artist with 150 albums and 25 million copies sold, leading man in the Golden Age of Mexican cinema including The Soldiers of Pancho Villa; as José Pascual Antonio Aguilar Márquez Barraza, in Villanueva, Zacatecas, Mexico (d. 2007)
  - Joseph Weber, American physicist, developer of the Weber bar used to detect gravitational waves; in Paterson, New Jersey, United States (d. 2000)
- Died:
  - José Santos Zelaya, 65, Nicaraguan state leader, 11th President of Nicaragua (b. 1853)
  - Guido von List, 70, Austrian poet and occultist, promoter of modern Heathenry (b. 1848)

== May 18, 1919 (Sunday) ==
- Arenas Club de Getxo defeated Barcelona 5–2 in the final association football match in Madrid to win their first Copa del Rey championship title.
- British pilot Harry Hawker and co-pilot Kenneth Mackenzie-Grieve attempted the first non-stop transatlantic flight but were forced to ditch their aircraft only 2,253 km (1,400 mi) after leaving Newfoundland. The London newspaper Daily Mail awarded them a prize of £5,000 for their attempt anyway since Hawker flew over 1,000 miles (1,600 km) without ditching the aircraft.
- The Idaho State Police was established, initially as the Bureau of Constabulary under the Idaho Department of Law Enforcement.
- Born: Margot Fonteyn, English ballet dancer, known for her lead collaborations for The Royal Ballet during the 1950s and 1960s; as Margaret Evelyn Hookham, in Reigate, England (d. 1991)
- Died: James McParland, 75, American law enforcer, best known for uncovering the Molly Maguires activist group (b. 1844)

== May 19, 1919 (Monday) ==
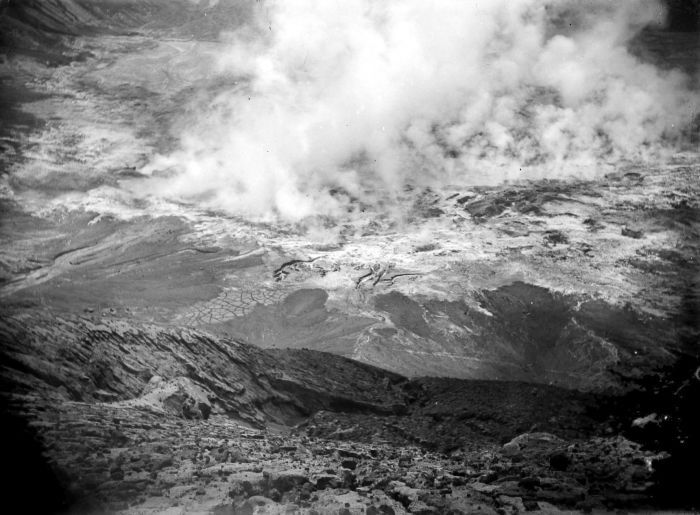
The crater of the Kelud volcano in Java

- The Kelud volcano erupted in Java, killing about 5,000 people.
- Ottoman army general Mustafa Kemal Atatürk landed at the port city of Samsun on the Black Sea coast of Turkey, marking the start of the Turkish War of Independence.
- Russian Civil War – The Fifth Red Army began pursuing the White Russian Southern Group.
- The 21st Division of the British Army was disbanded.
- The Royal Air Force disbanded air group No. 14.
- In the USA the National Parks Conservation Association was established as the citizen watchdog for the National Park Service, with Stephen Mather as its first director.
- Eric Geddes was appointed as the first Minister of Transport of the British government.
- The first issue of The Carolinian was published at the State Normal and Industrial College.
- Born: Mitja Ribičič, Slovene state leader, 25th Prime Minister of Yugoslavia; in Trieste, Kingdom of Italy (present-day Italy) (d. 2013)

== May 20, 1919 (Tuesday) ==
- The Chamber of Deputies passed a bill to extend universal suffrage to women in France, with 377 in favor and 97 against. However, it failed to pass the Senate and delayed women's voting rights until 1944.
- American pilots Elmer Fowler Stone and Walter Hinton, under command of Albert Cushing Read, took off from the Azores for the third major leg of the transatlantic flight but were forced to land again at Ponta Delgada, São Miguel Island 150 miles (240 km) from where they started due to mechanical problems.
- The Ukrainian Republic Capella held their first performance in Czechoslovakia and continued their European tour in Switzerland, France, Belgium, the Netherlands, and England. Intended to promote Ukrainian music and culture abroad, it staged a second tour in 1920 before breaking up in 1921.
- Rudolph Valentino and Mae Murray starred together in the film drama The Delicious Little Devil, directed by Robert Z. Leonard and distributed through Universal Pictures. A copy of the film is housed at the EYE Film Institute Netherlands in Amsterdam.
- The musical Kissing Time, with music by Ivan Caryll and book by Guy Bolton and P. G. Wodehouse, premiered at the Winter Garden Theatre in London with Stanley Holloway, Yvonne Arnaud, Leslie Henson, George Grossmith Jr., and Phyllis Dare in the cast. It was estimated one million people saw the show during its run of 430 performances.
- The football club Zugdidi was established in Zugdidi, Georgia.
- Born: George Gobel, American comedian, best known for his 1950s television variety program The George Gobel Show; as George Leslie Goebel, in Chicago, United States (d. 1991)

== May 21, 1919 (Wednesday) ==
- The Royal Navy defeated the Soviet Navy at Russian naval base Fort Alexandrovsky in the Caspian Sea during the Russian Civil War. The Soviets lost eleven ships in the battle.
- The Oklahoma Hospital Association was established with physician Fred S. Clinton as first president.
- Born: George P. Mitchell, American industrialist, credited as the architect of the shale gas industry in the United States; in Galveston, Texas, United States (d. 2013)

== May 22, 1919 (Thursday) ==
- The House of Commons of Canada passed the Nickle Resolution, named after MP William Folger Nickle who initially made the motion, which would bar the British Crown from granting noble titles or knighthoods to Canadian citizens.
- American hotel owner Raymond Orteig offered a prize of $25,000 to the first aviator to fly non-stop from New York City to Paris. However, aircraft were still not designed to do transatlantic flights of that length until the mid-1920s when Orteig offered the prize again. Ultimately, it was Charles Lindbergh who won it in 1927.
- The Royal Guernsey Light Infantry of the British Army was disbanded at Fort George, Guernsey, France.
- The United Jewish Communist Workers Party and Jewish Communist Labour Bund merged to form the Jewish Communist Union in Ukraine.
- American archaeologist A. E. Douglass provided to Clark Wissler of the American Museum of Natural History the first comparative dendrochronology datings for sites in New Mexico.
- Polish train locomotive manufacturer Fablok was established as Fabryka Locomotive in Chrzanów, Poland.
- Pope Benedict established the Vicariate Apostolic of Chaco from territory in the Diocese of Santa Cruz de la Sierra in Bolivia. It became the Apostolic Vicariate of Camiri in 2003.
- The bronze sculpture The Pioneer, created by Alexander Phimister Proctor, was unveiled on the University of Oregon campus in Eugene, Oregon.
- The choral work of Liturgy of St. John Chrysostom by Ukrainian composer Mykola Leontovych was first performed at the Kiev Monastery of the Caves in Kiev, with Leontovych himself conducting.
- The Lithuanian Army began publishing its own military magazine Word of Soldiers (later Karys) in Kaunas, Lithuania.
- The football club Nike was established in Lomma, Sweden.
- Born:
  - Paul Vanden Boeynants, Belgian state leader, 41st Prime Minister of Belgium; in Forest, Belgium (d. 2001)
  - Peter Howson, Australian politician, cabinet minister for the Robert Menzies and William McMahon administrations; in London, England (d. 2009)

== May 23, 1919 (Friday) ==
- Third Anglo-Afghan War – Stretched supplies and communications created disorder among British forces within the Kurram region along the Afghan-British India border, with several posts being abandoned.
- The University of California opened its second campus in Los Angeles as its Southern Branch before it was eventually renamed the University of California, Los Angeles (UCLA).
- The Odessa Governorate approved creating a film studio out three defunct companies, becoming the All-Ukrainian Photo Cinema Administration in 1922. It was reorganized into "Ukrainafilm" in 1930 and then in 2005 as the Odessa Film Studio.
- Born:
  - Betty Garrett, American actress, best known for her comedic supporting roles in the 1970s television sitcoms All in the Family and Laverne & Shirley; in St. Joseph, Missouri, United States (d. 2011)
  - Ruth Fernández, Puerto Rican musician and politician, noted promoter of bolero music, member of the Senate of Puerto Rico from 1973 to 1981; in Ponce, Puerto Rico (d. 2012)
  - Gayatri Devi, Indian noble, third Maharani of Jaipur; in London, England (d. 2009)
  - Nina Dumbadze, Soviet athlete, bronze medalist at the 1952 Summer Olympics; in Odessa, Ukrainian People's Republic (present-day Ukraine) (d. 1983)

== May 24, 1919 (Saturday) ==
- Estonian War of Independence – The Estonian Army launched a second offensive against the Seventh Red Army.
- Third Anglo-Afghan War – British aircraft bombed Kabul.
- Women's suffrage was approved in Sweden and would be used for the first time in the 1921 election.
- The second prototype of the Bristol Badger successfully completed its test flight with a new engine design.
- Born: Sid Couchey, American comic book artist, best known for his work on Richie Rich, Little Lotta, and Little Dot for Harvey Comics; in Cleveland, United States (d. 2012)
- Died:
  - Amado Nervo, 48, Mexican poet, known for his poetry collections Místicas and Perlas Negras (d. 1870)
  - Asa Bird Gardiner, 79, American army officer, recipient of the Medal of Honor for action during the American Civil War (b. 1839)

== May 25, 1919 (Sunday) ==
- Estonian War of Independence – Estonian forces captured Pskov, Russia from the Seventh Red Army and handed it over to the White Russians in June.
- Brann Stadion opened in Bergen, Norway with the first football match between the local and national teams.
- Died: Madam C. J. Walker, 51, American business leader, founder of Madam C. J. Walker Manufacturing Company, considered one of the most successful businesses owned and run by African Americans; died of kidney failure and complications of hypertension (b. 1867)

== May 26, 1919 (Monday) ==
- Feeling ill and frustrated with the lack of progress at the Paris Peace Conference to ensure the Central Powers made a full economic recovery from World War I as a strategy for lasting peace, British economist John Maynard Keynes resigned from his position as delegate for the British Treasury and returned to England. While recovering, he wrote The Economic Consequences of the Peace as criticism for the post-war peace process.
- The 10th Battalion of the East Yorkshire Regiment of the British Army, better known as the Hull Pals, were disbanded in Kingston upon Hull, England.
- The Tarrant Tabor aircraft crashed shortly after taking off on its first test flight at the Royal Aircraft Establishment in Farnborough, Hampshire, England, with both pilots dying from their injuries days later.
- Born: Rubén González, Cuban musician, leading promoter of Afro-Cuban jazz and member of the Buena Vista Social Club; in Santa Clara, Cuba (d. 2003)

== May 27, 1919 (Tuesday) ==
- Third Anglo-Afghan War – The British Army used an escalade for the last time in its military operations while laying siege to the Afghan fortress Spin Boldak, resulting in its capture.
- The Romanian Army suppressed a Bolshevik uprising in Tighina, Romania. More than 150 rebels were captured and executed as hundreds fled over the Dniester River into Ukraine.
- After repairing their Curtiss airplane in the Azores, American pilots Elmer Fowler Stone and Walter Hinton, under command of Albert Cushing Read, landed in Lisbon, completing the first ever transatlantic flight. Because of delays, the trip from Newfoundland to Lisbon took 10 days and 22 hours, but the actual flight time totaled 26 hours and 46 minutes.
- Russian naval officer Fyodor Raskolnikov, commander of the destroyer Spartak captured by the Royal Navy in December, was exchanged for 17 British prisoners of war. He was afterward appointed commander of the Caspian Flotilla by Leon Trotsky.
- The football club Knattspyrnufélagið Hörður was established in Ísafjörður, Iceland and later expanded to include other sports such as handball, track and field, skiing and Icelandic wrestling.

== May 28, 1919 (Wednesday) ==
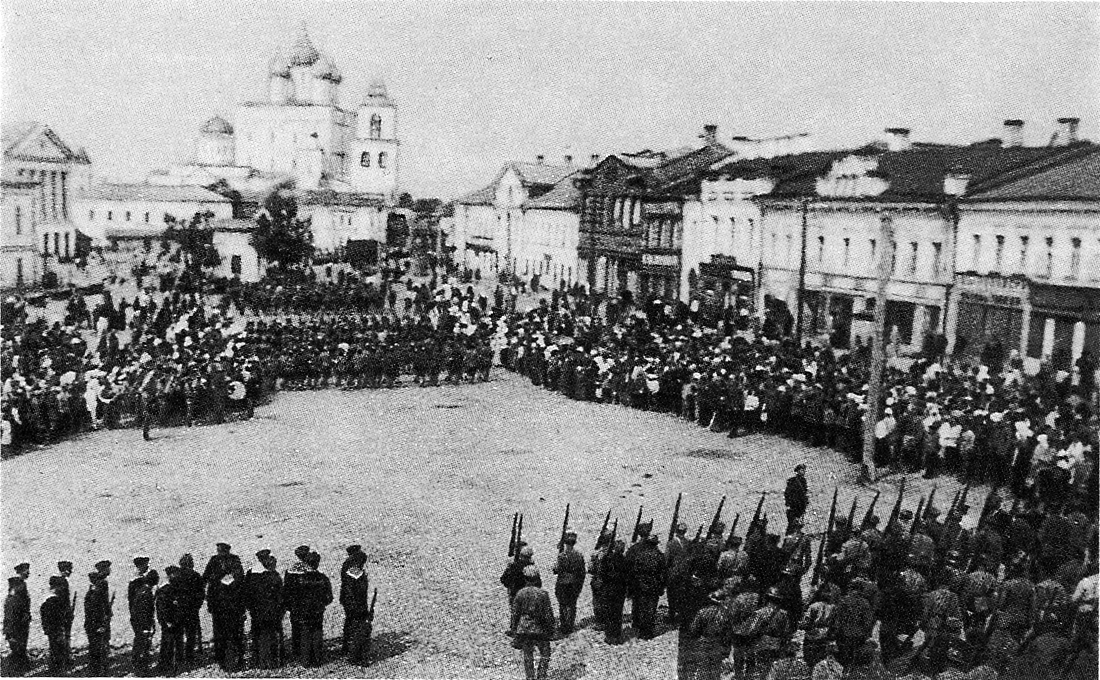
Estonian army parade following the capture of Pskov, Estonia (now part of Russia).

- On the first anniversary of the establishment of the First Republic of Armenia, Prime Minister Alexander Khatisian declared "the ancestral Armenian lands located in Transcaucasia and the Ottoman Empire" were to be given independence and brought together under the United Republic of Armenia.
- Russian Civil War – The White Russians crossed the Belaya River to engage the Turkestan Army near Ufa, Russia.
- Third Anglo-Afghan War – Afghan forces laid siege to British units entrenched in Thall, British India (now Pakistan).
- The 3rd Australian Division was disbanded.
- The first electric railway in Melbourne began operating, with the first train leaving from Flinders Street to Sandringham and then on to Essendon.
- Born:
  - Lim Chong Eu, Malaysian politician, second Chief Minister of Penang, in Penang; Straits Settlements, British Malaya (present-day Malaysia) (d. 2010)
  - May Swenson, American poet, known for her collections including Iconographs; as Anna Thilda May Swenson, in Logan, Utah, United States (d. 1989)
  - Lauri Törni, Finnish-American soldier, member of the Finnish Army and Waffen-SS during World War II, member of United States Army Special Forces during the Vietnam War, recipient of the Mannerheim Cross, Iron Cross, Legion of Merit, and Distinguished Flying Cross; in Viipuri, Finland (d. 1965, killed in helicopter crash)
- Died: Edward Bartley, 80, New Zealand architect, designer of many noted public buildings in Auckland including the Kings Theatre and Auckland Savings Bank Building (b. 1839)

== May 29, 1919 (Thursday) ==
- Russian Civil War – The Turkestan Army defeated White Russian forces on the west bank of Belaya River in Russia.
- Third Anglo-Afghan War – The London Regiment under the command of Reginald Dyer was dispatched to support British units under assault by the Afghans at Thall, British India.
- Albert Einstein's theory of general relativity was tested by Arthur Eddington's observation of the "bending of light" during a total solar eclipse in Príncipe, São Tomé and Príncipe and by Andrew Crommelin in Sobral, Ceará, Brazil. With the eclipse lasting 6 minutes 51 seconds, it was the longest recorded since May 27, 1416 although a longer one would occur on June 8, 1937.
- Cologne City Hall re-established the charter for the University of Cologne. The original university closed in 1798.
- Brazil hosted the third South American Championship in Rio de Janeiro and also won the football tournament.
- The New York City Subway formally opened the completed BMT Brighton Line from Prospect Park to Coney Island.
- Methuen Publishing released The Secret Battle by A. P. Herbert, which was based on his own wartime experiences.
- Born:
  - Jacques Genest, Canadian physician, founder of the Montreal Clinical Research Institute; in Montreal, Canada (d. 2018)
  - Dickie Dodds, English cricketer, batsman for the Essex County Cricket Club from 1946 to 1959; as Thomas Carter Dodds, in Bedford, England (d. 2001)
  - Ira C. Kepford, American naval air force officer, commander of the VF-17 squadron during World War II, two-time recipient of the Navy Cross, Silver Star, and Distinguished Flying Cross; in Harvey, Illinois, United States (d. 1987)
- Died: Robert Bacon, 58, American public servant, 39th United States Secretary of State and U.S. Ambassador to France from 1909 to 1912; died of blood poisoning (b. 1860)

== May 30, 1919 (Friday) ==
- Paris Peace Conference – The United Kingdom reached an agreement to cede a portion of German East Africa (now Ruanda-Urundi) to Belgium.
- Russian Civil War – The Fifth Red Army crossed the Belaya River in Russia to pursue the retreating White Russian Army.
- Journalist Constancio C. Vigil published the first edition of the weekly newspaper El Gráfico in Buenos Aires. It eventually became a monthly sports magazine before its run ended in 2018.
- Born:
  - René Barrientos, Bolivian state leader, 56th and 58th President of Bolivia; in Tarata, Cochabamba, Bolivia (d. 1969, killed in a helicopter crash)
  - Eric Lomax, British army officer and writer, survivor of the Burma Railway prison camp during World War II, author of The Railway Man; in Edinburgh, Scotland (d. 2012)
- Died: Barbu Nemțeanu, 31, Romanian poet, member of the Symbolist movement in Romania; died of a pulmonary hemorrhage (b. 1887)

== May 31, 1919 (Saturday) ==
- Estonian War of Independence – The Estonian Army continued a successful campaign against the Red Army with the capture of the Soviet-held towns of Alūksne, Gulbene, and Valmiera in northern Latvia.
- Incumbent Walter Lee retained his position as Premier of Tasmania, defeating Joseph Lyons with 55% of the vote in the state election for Tasmania, Australia.
- American pilots Elmer Fowler Stone and Walter Hinton, under command of Albert Cushing Read, landed in Plymouth, England to great fanfare, completing the first ever transatlantic flight.
- Racing driver Howdy Wilcox won the 7th Indianapolis 500 but the race was marred by three fatalities including racers Arthur Thurman and Louis LeCocq, along with LeCocq's mechanic, Robert Bandini.
- The 60th Infantry Division of the British Army was disbanded.
- The 26th Australian Battalion was disbanded.
- The United States government disbanded the National War Labor Board.
- New Zealand aviator George Bolt flew from Auckland to Russell, New Zealand in a Boeing Model 1 floatplane, a record distance of 233 kilometres (145 mi) for New Zealand.
- A second prototype of the Avro Baby aircraft was first flown.
- Conrad Hilton opened his first hotel in Cisco, Texas, although the first one bearing the Hilton brand name would not open until 1925 in Dallas.
- Hand tools manufacturer Blackhawk was established in Milwaukee as a subsidiary of the American Grinder Company.
- Born:
  - Vance Hartke, American politician, U.S. Senator from Indiana from 1959 to 1977; as Rupert Vance Hartke, in Stendal, Indiana, United States (d. 2003)
  - Robie Macauley, American writer, editor of The Kenyon Review and Playboy magazine, author of The Disguises of Love and The End of Pity and Other Stories; in Grand Rapids, Michigan, United States (d. 1995)
  - E. T. Mensah, Ghanaian musician, promoter of highlife music; as Emmanuel Tettey Mensah, in Accra, Gold Coast (present-day Ghana) (d. 1996)
- Died: Goes Ahead, 67–68, Native American scout, member of the Crow Nation, scout for the 7th Cavalry Regiment under command of George Armstrong Custer, survivor and witness to the Battle of the Little Bighorn (b. 1851)
