= Keelung Nuannuan pothole =

Keelung Nuannuan pothole is potholes or kettle holes in the exposed bed of the Keelung River at Nuannuan District, Keelung City in Taiwan. These potholes are a circular indentation on the riverbed carved out into solid rock. It is formed by a kind of drilling action when pebbles are caught in eddy currents and whisked around within a small natural crack or hollow. As time passes, the drilling action enlarges the hollow to form a pothole. Potholes are commonly found below waterfalls or rapids where significant hydraulic action is found.

== Geological interest ==
These naturally occurring potholes are of great interest to geologists. They are quite uncommon. The best-known kettle holes in Taiwan are a mass of indents in the exposed bed of the Keelung River at the town of Nuannuan, near Keelung City. These well-known potholes lie right beside a busy road. Near Nuannuan, the Keelung River is narrow with faster flowing water and turbulence. The faster flowing water and turbulence results in the formation of these potholes. Riverbed potholes take hundreds of years to form. It is an important geological feature. The formation phenomena provokes wide research interests in fluid dynamics, landscape, geology, climate, hydrological and rock studies. Its rarity also serves as an educational resource for everybody.

== Guo-Gang Community ==
There are around 4400 people living in Nuannuan district forming a Guo-Gang Community (過港社區). The people of the Guo-Gang community play an important part in the protection of the potholes in Nuannuan. These potholes were badly damaged when the nearby highways were built 12 years ago. The highways are due for service in 2012 and the Guo-Gang community has been active raising government's awareness of how valuable these potholes are in the hope to reduce the overall damage.

== Picture gallery ==
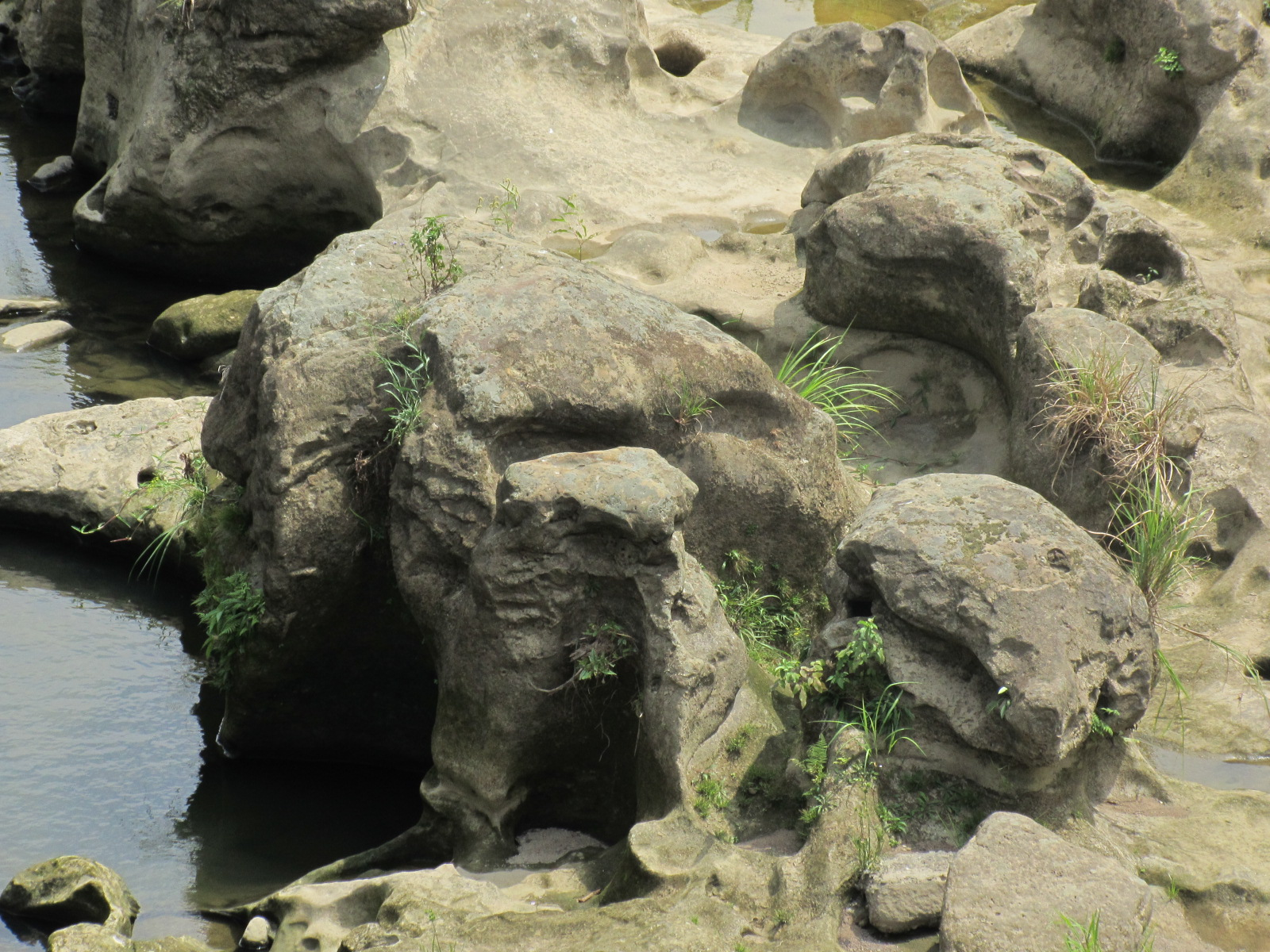
Nuannuan Pothole in 2010

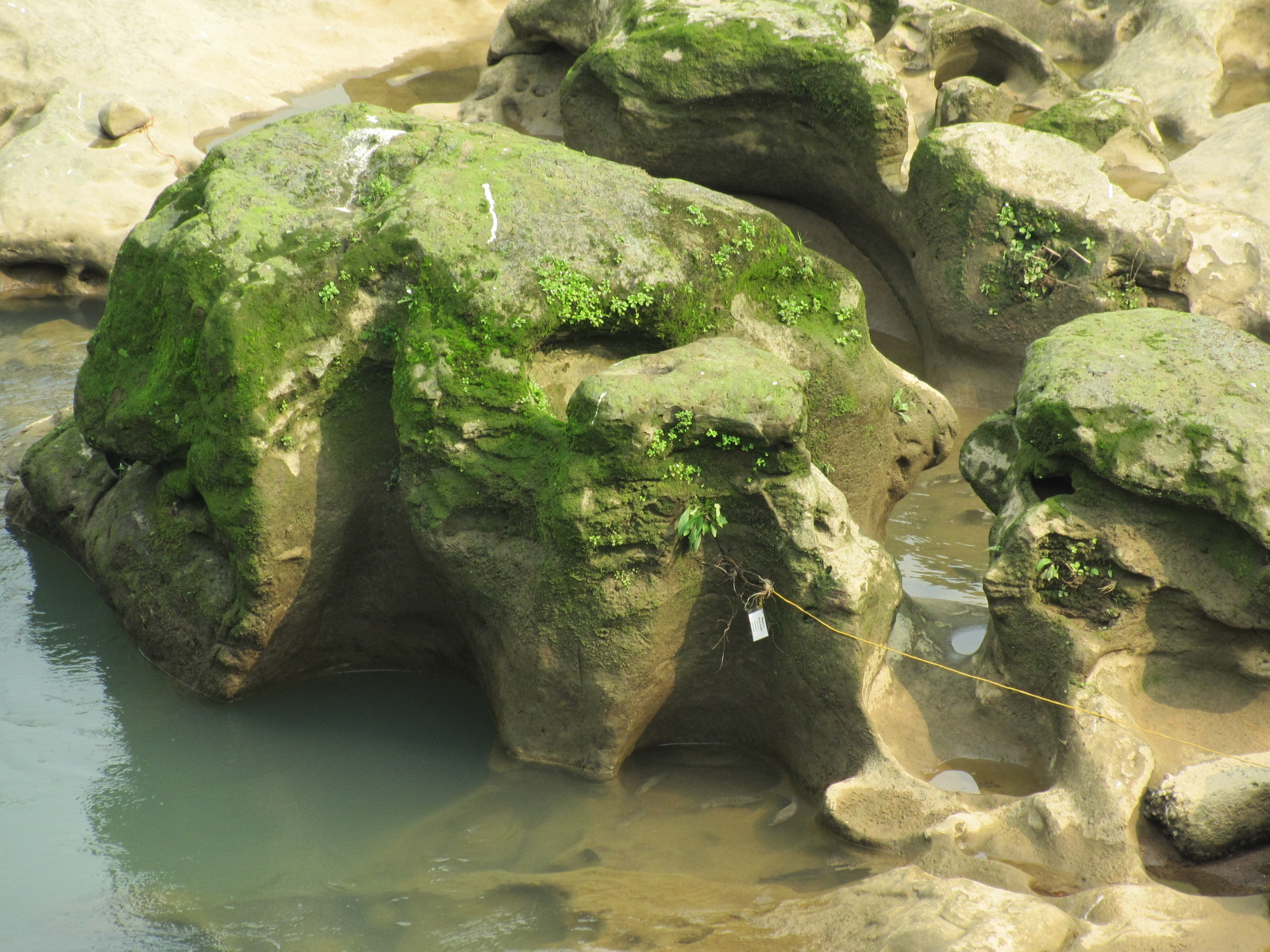
Nuannuan Pothole in 2010

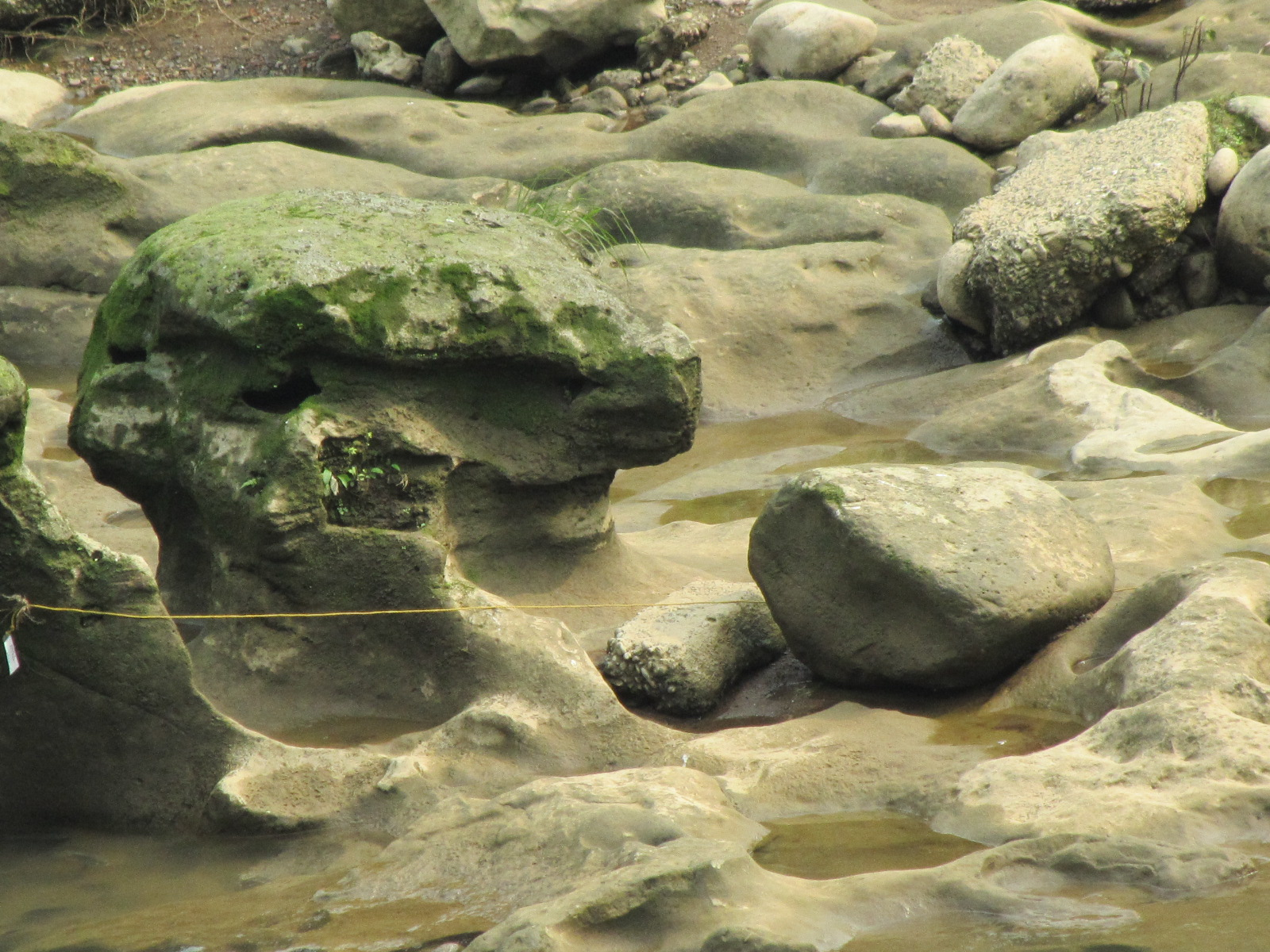
Nuannuan Pothole in 2010

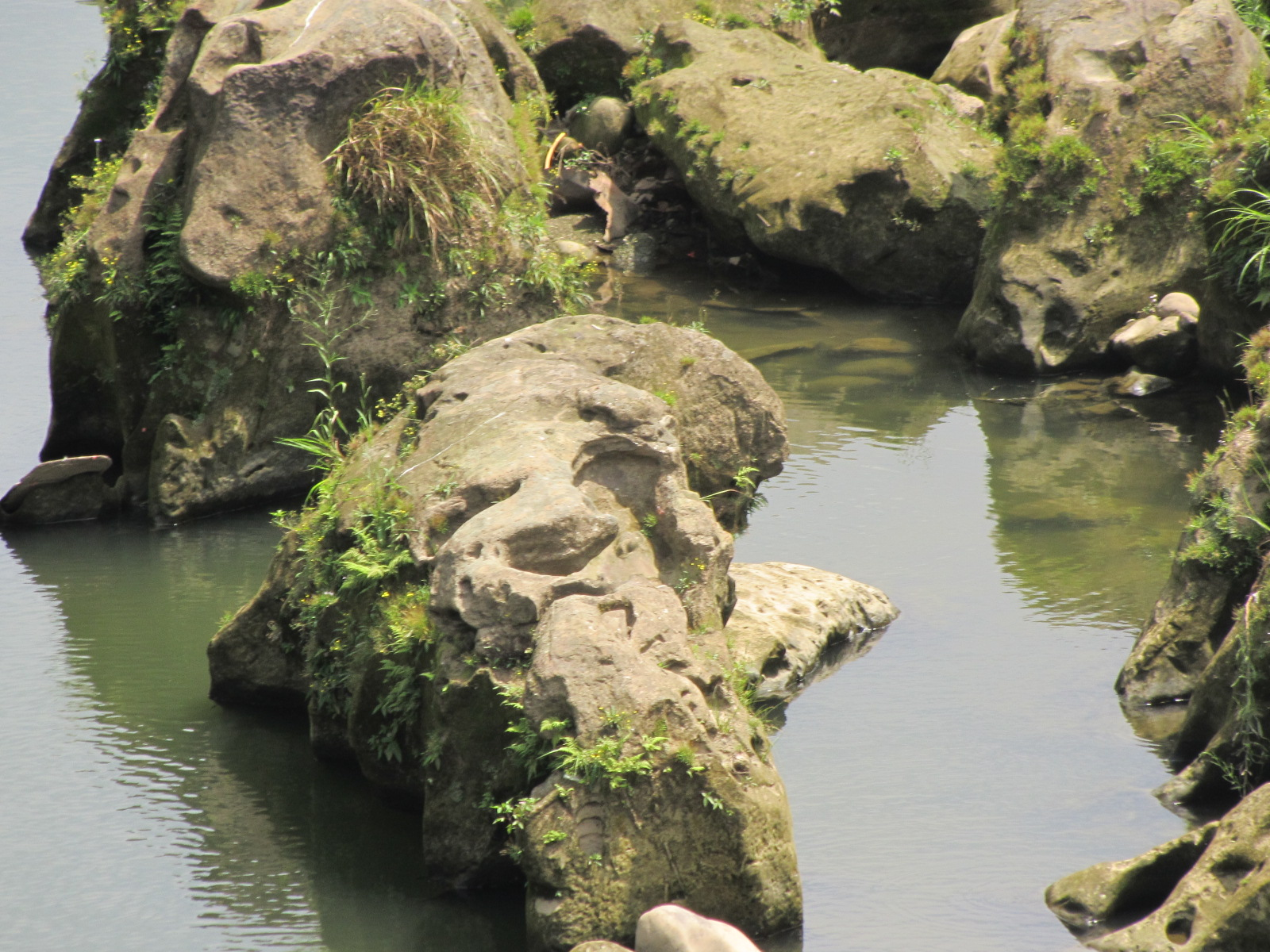
Nuannuan Pothole in 2010

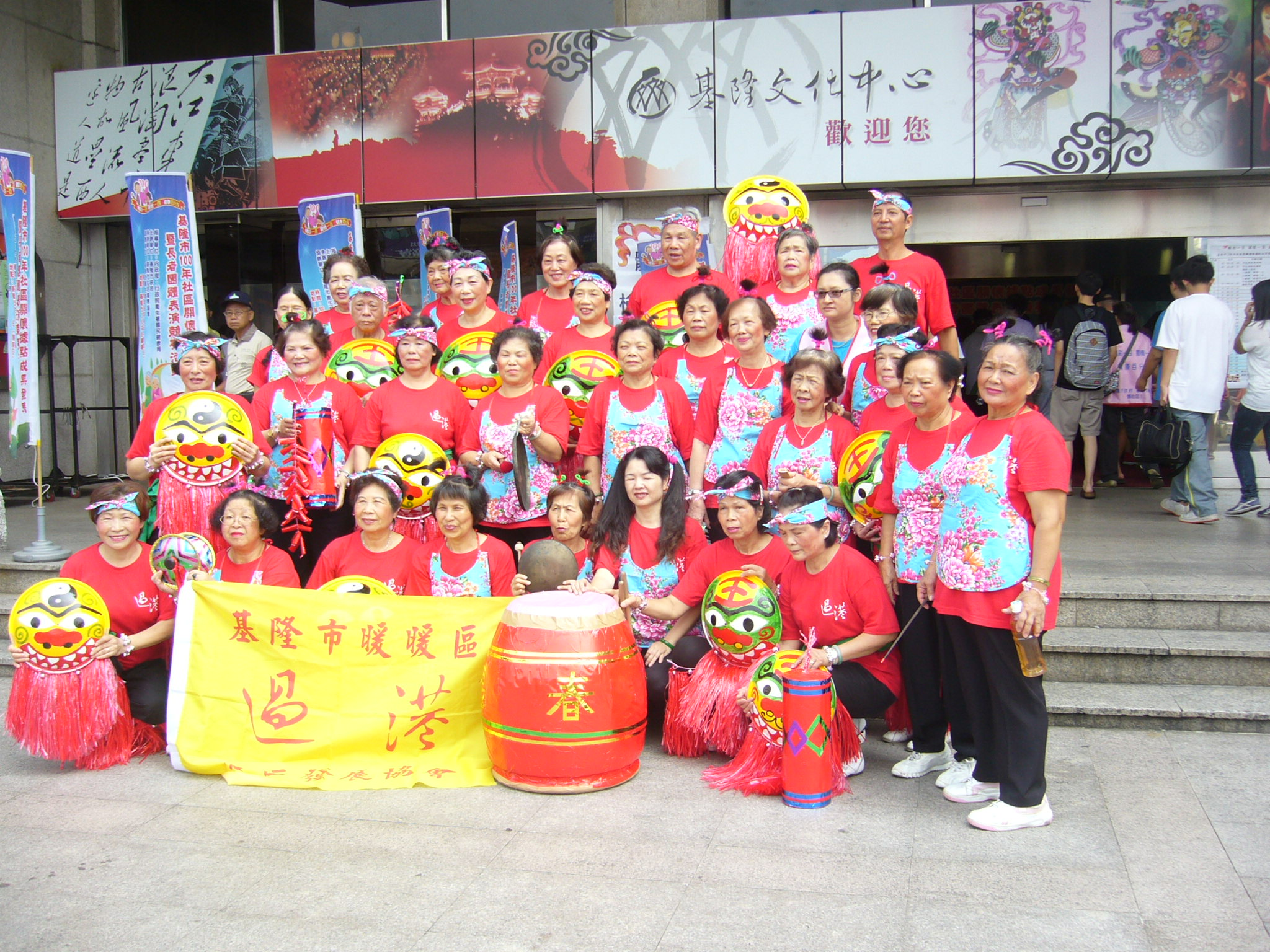
Guo-Gang Community
