= Nuannuan Ande Temple =

Temple in Nuannuan, Keelung, Taiwan

- 暖暖安德宮
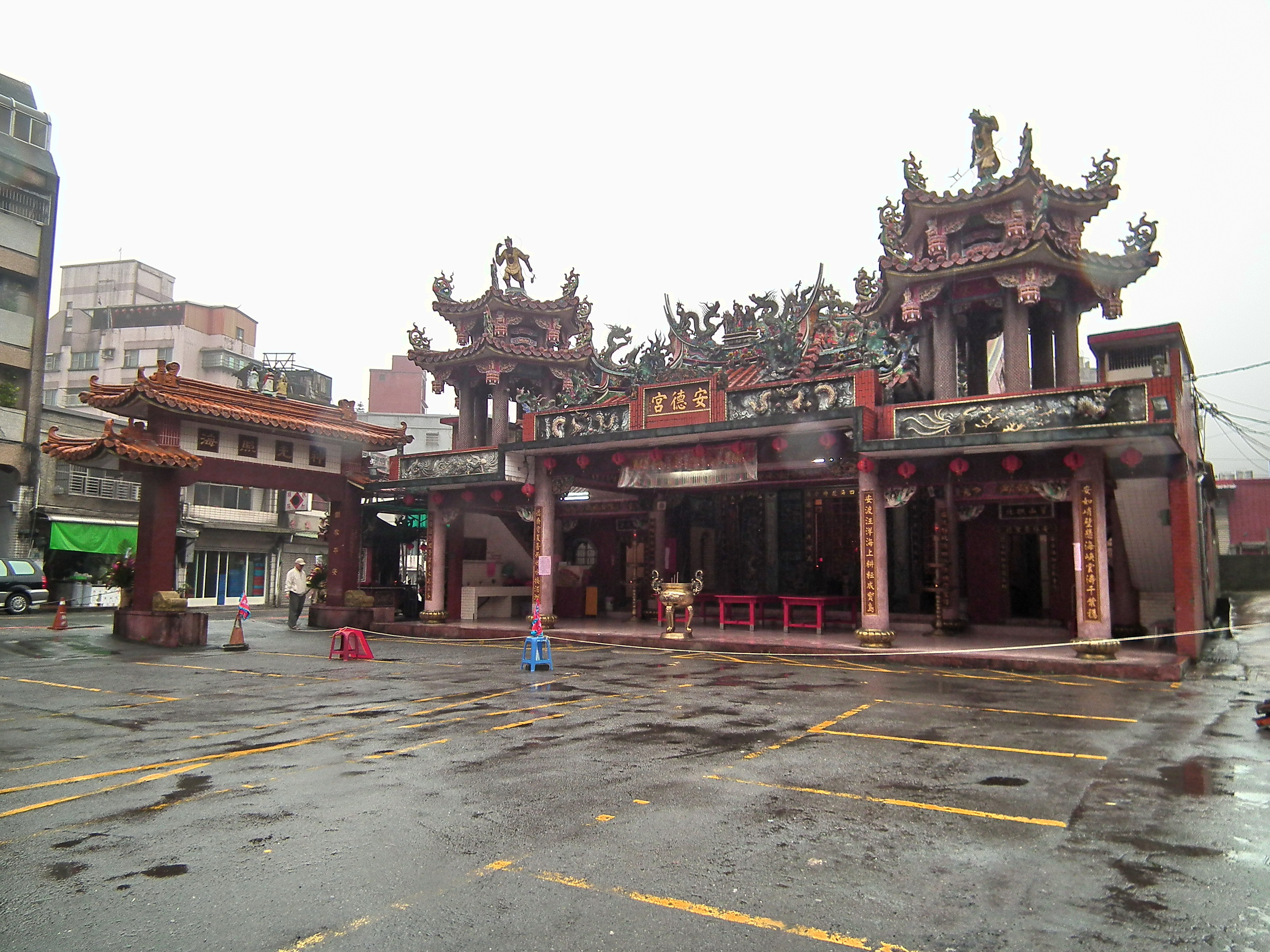

- Taiwan

Religion
- Affiliation: Taoism

Location
- Location: Nuannuan, Keelung, Taiwan
- Interactive map of Nuannuan Ande Temple
- Coordinates: 25°6′7.5″N 121°44′18.9″E

Architecture
- Type: temple
- Completed: 1801

The Nuannuan Ande Temple (Chinese: 暖暖安德宮; pinyin: Nuǎnnuǎn Āndé Gōng) is a temple in Nuannuan District, Keelung, Taiwan. The temple is dedicated to the sea goddess Mazu, the patron deity of fishermen, sailors, and any marine-related occupations. The temple is an important and prominent place of worship in Nuannuan District.

== History ==
The temple was originally constructed in 1801. Since then, it has undergone several renovations, with the last major reconstruction completed in 1996.

== Transportation ==
The temple is accessible within walking distance to the west of TR Nuannuan Station.

== See also ==
- Qianliyan & Shunfeng'er
- List of Mazu temples around the world
- Ciyou Temple, Songshan District of Taipei
- Guandu Temple, Beitou District of Taipei
- List of temples in Taiwan
- Religion in Taiwan
