= Urla clashes =

Coordinates: 38°19′N 26°45′E

- Part of the Greco-Turkish War (1919–22)
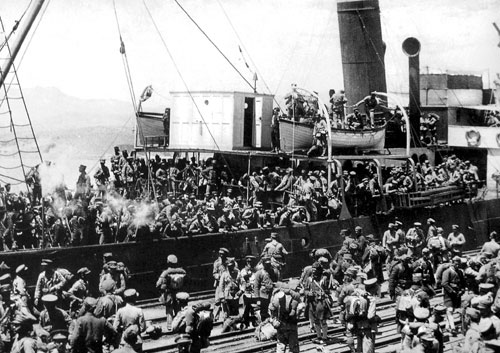
- Greek soldiers disembarking in Smyrna (May 1919)
Date	16–17 May 1919
Location	Urla
Result	Greek victory: Greek army enters Urla

Belligerents
(Kingdom of Greece) Greece	Ottoman Empire

Commanders and leaders
	Lieutenant colonel Kazım Bey¹

Strength
800 irregular Greeks; 2 Greek army companies	25 soldiers and gendarmeries 120 militia men
- 1: 173. regiment commander, 2: 173. regiment soldiers

Urla Clashes were a series of clashes in Urla (now a district center of İzmir Province, Turkey) during the Greco-Turkish War (1919–1922). After the Greek landing at İzmir, the Greek army advanced and occupied Bornova and Karşıyaka. After that, it advanced to the Karaburun Peninsula where Urla was situated.

== Prelude ==
Incited by the Greek army's presence, about 800 armed local Greeks started to besiege and attack Turkish villages in Urla. The villages of Kuşçular, Kızılcaköy and Devederesi were looted and burnt down. Additionally, a Greek Evzones company, disembarking a torpedo boat, went ashore in Urla and started to occupy Urla.

== Clashes ==
At this time, the 173. infantry regiment of the Ottoman 56th division was stationed in Urla. The commander of the regiment was Lieutenant colonel Kazım Bey. The regiment consisted of 100 men, but most of them were scattered around Urla. Kazım Bey had only 25 soldiers and gendarmeries under his command when the attacks commenced. With these 25 men, he managed to repel the irregular Greek attacks. As soon as the local Turkish population heard about these incidents, they entered the arms depot of the town and took the rifles and ammunition. With these rifles and ammunition, they established the first Kuva-yi Milliye unit in western Anatolia, consisting of 120 men. This militia unit joined Kazım Bey's forces. The clashes lasted from 16–17 May. A Greek battleship docked at the Urla pier and unloaded more Greek troops. The arrival of Greek troops, from Smyrna, accompanied by a British officer, ended the clashes on the evening of 17 May.

== Aftermath ==
The surrendered Turkish soldiers and gendarmeries were disarmed and arrested. On the other hand, most of the 120 men strong militia unit retreated to the interior of Anatolia. It has been claimed that these clashes in Urla marked the first combined activity between Turkish irregular and regular units in the Greco-Turkish War (1919–1922).

== Sources ==
- Oğuz Gülcan: BATI ANADOLU’DA KUVAYI MİLLİYENİN OLUŞUMU (1919–1920), Ankara Üniversitesi Türk İnkılap Tarihi Enstitüsü, 2007, pages 177-179 (Ankara University Open Archive System). (in Turkish)
