= Yidishe tsaytung =

Yiddish-language daily newspaper published in 1919

- Type: Daily newspaper
- Editor: Jakub Wygodzki
- Founded: May 1919
- Ceased publication: December 1919
- Country: Lithuania

Yidishe tsaytung ('Jewish Newspaper') was a Yiddish-language daily newspaper published from Vilna between May and December 1919. The first issue was published on May 9, 1919. The newspaper was the organ of the Vilna Zionist Organization. Dr. Jakub Wygodzki served as the editor of Yidishe tsaytung.
