= The Twofold Bay Magnet =

The Twofold Bay Magnet and South Coast and Southern Monaro Advertiser was an English language newspaper published in Monaro, New South Wales, Australia.

Front page of The Twofold Bay Magnet and South Coast and Southern Monaro Advertiser, 5 June 1908

== Newspaper history ==
The Twofold Bay Magnet and South Coast and Southern Monaro Advertiser was first published on 5 June 1908. The first edition's editorial declared

The establishment of the paper is not based on personal agrandisement [sic] by any means. We, like others, felt that there was something wanting to further the interests of so important a centre. There was only one course open, and that was to establish a medium whereby full vent might be given to those attributes which go to popularise and bring before distant people all those essentials which tend to put the wheels of progress in motion.

One issue of great concern to the proprietors was the construction of a railway from Bega to Eden. Above all, the editors declared democracy to be the paper's overriding policy.

The proprietors of the newspaper were determined to set The Twofold Bay Magnet and South Coast and Southern Monaro Advertiser apart from other country newspapers with the introduction of illustrated matter "depicting the beauty-spots of our district". The paper moved to aggressively promote the local tourism industry based in and around the areas of Eden and Southern Monaro that had otherwise been overlooked.

A firm commitment to quality news reportage was made through special arrangements for a prompt and concise national and international telegraphic service and the employment of a number of correspondents who were appointed throughout the electorate. All shipping and commercial notes were to be specialised. Of particular importance to the newspaper were "all matters that affect the mining, pastoral and agricultural industries".

The Twofold Bay Magnet and South Coast and Southern Monaro Advertiser ceased publication on 17 May 1919 and was continued by The Eden Magnet and South Eastern Advocate and Advertiser published from 1919 to 1940.

== Digitisation ==
The Twofold Bay Magnet and South Coast and Southern Monaro Advertiser has been digitised as part of the Australian Newspapers Digitisation Program of the National Library of Australia.

== See also ==
- List of newspapers in New South Wales
- List of newspapers in Australia
