= Sijiaoting railway station =

Railway station in New Taipei, Taiwan

Sijiaoting 四腳亭車站
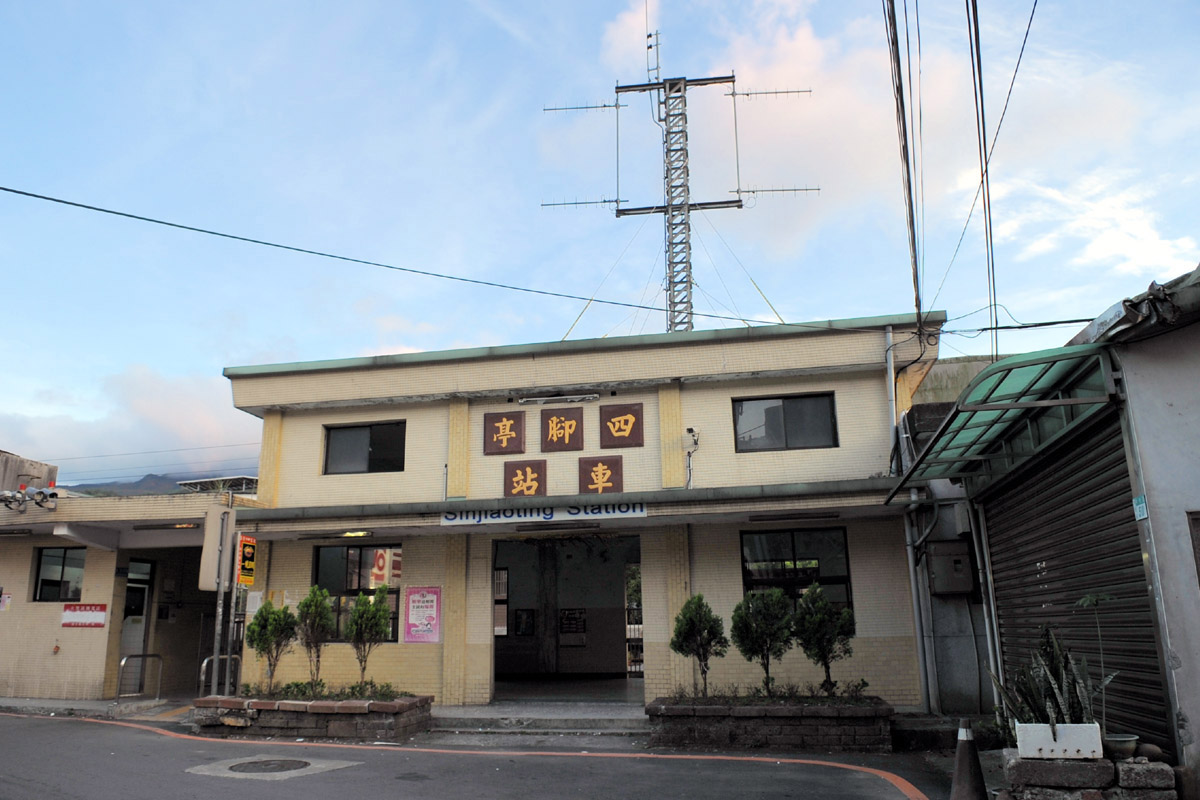

General information
- Location: Ruifang, New Taipei, Taiwan
- Coordinates: 25°6′10.36″N 121°45′40.27″E
- System: Train station
- Owner: Taiwan Railway Corporation
- Operator: Taiwan Railway Corporation
- Line: Eastern Trunk line
- Train operators: Taiwan Railway Corporation

History
- Opened: 5 May 1919

Passengers
- 1,470 daily (2024)

Services
Preceding station	Taiwan Railway	Following station
Nuannuan towards Badu	Eastern Trunk line	Ruifang towards Taitung
Location

Sijiaoting (Chinese: 四腳亭車站; Hanyu Pinyin: Sìjiǎotíng Chēzhàn; Tongyong Pinyin: Sìhjiǎotíng Chejhàn) is a railway station on the Taiwan Railway Yilan line. It is located in Ruifang District, New Taipei, Taiwan.

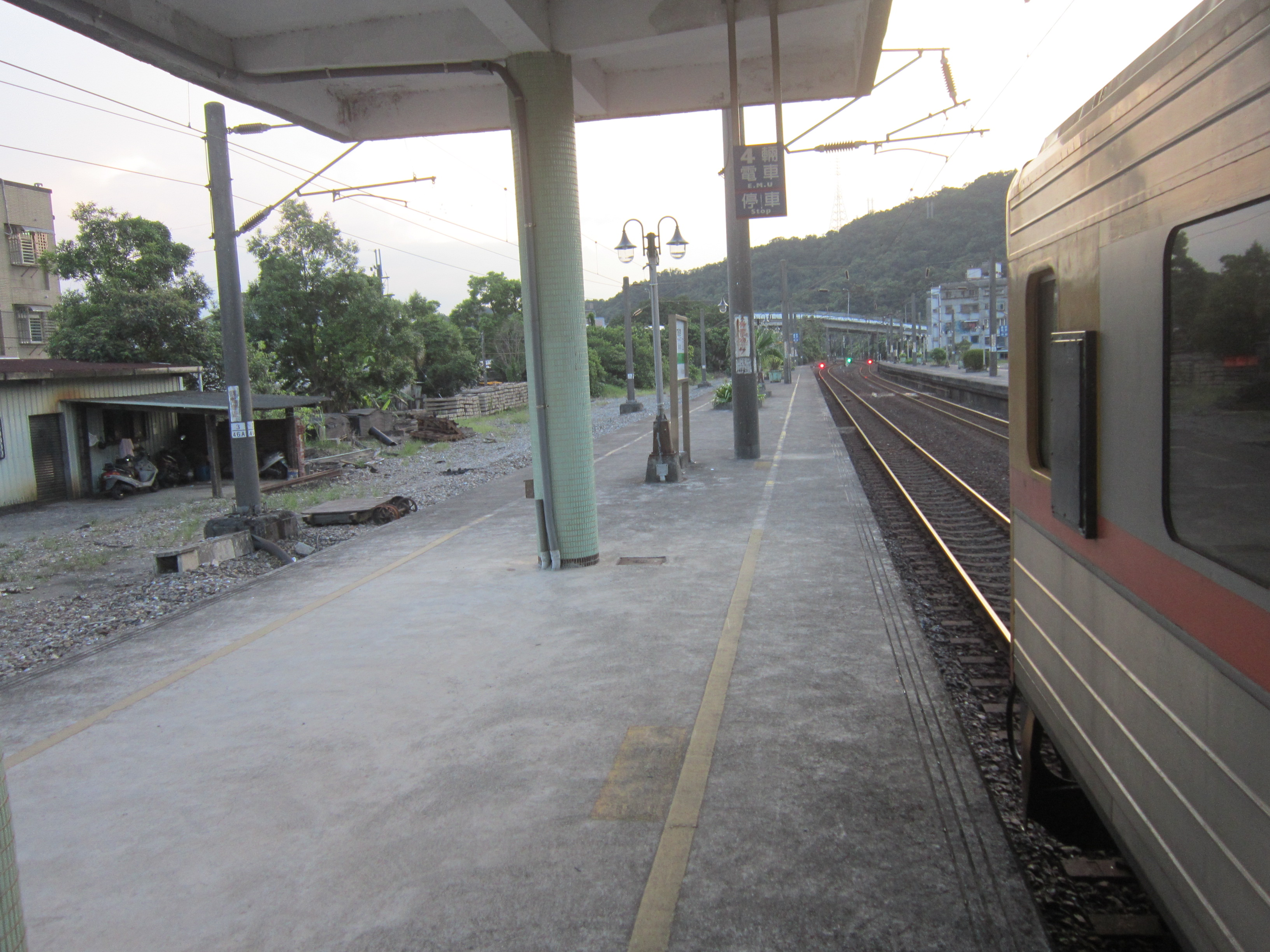
Sijiaoting station platform

== History ==
The station was opened on 5 May 1919.

== See also ==
- List of railway stations in Taiwan
