= Nuannuan railway station =

Railway station in Keelung, Taiwan

Nuannuan 暖暖車站
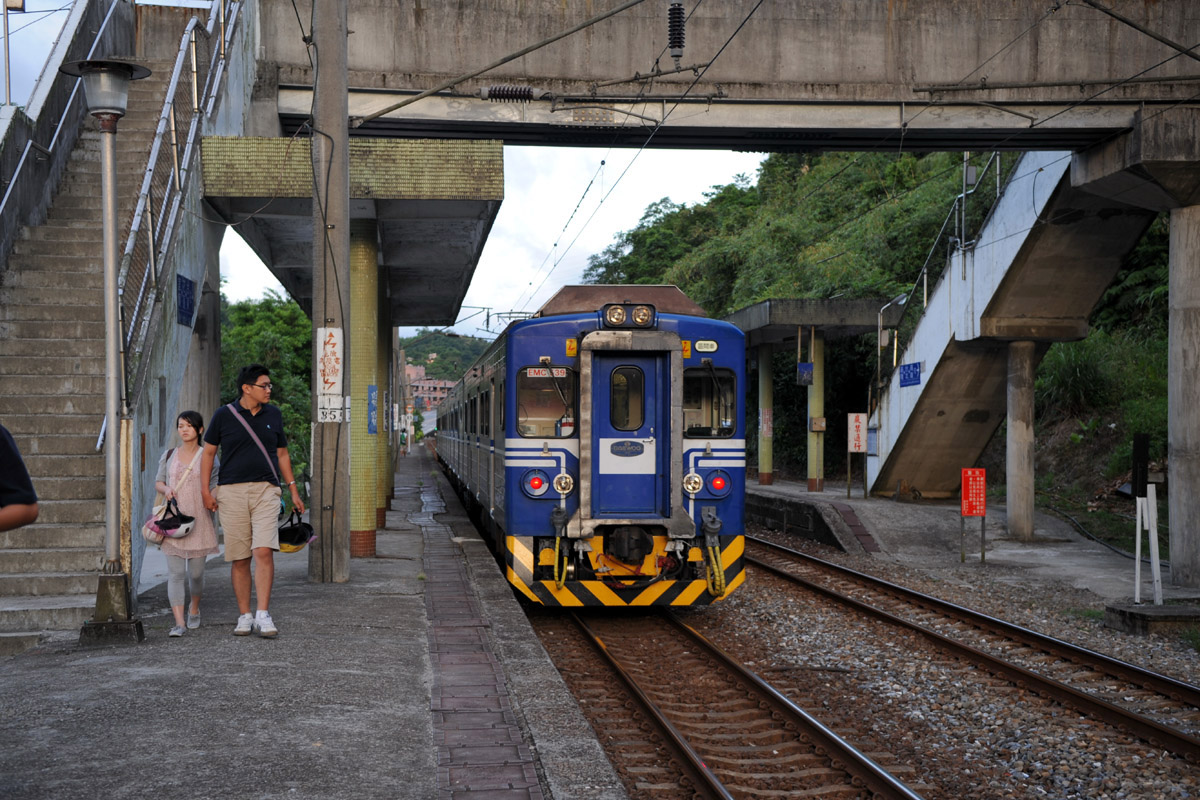

General information
- Location: Nuannuan, Keelung, Taiwan
- Coordinates: 25°6′8.39″N 121°44′26.28″E
- System: Train station
- Owner: Taiwan Railway Corporation
- Operator: Taiwan Railway Corporation
- Line: Eastern Trunk line
- Train operators: Taiwan Railway Corporation

History
- Opened: 5 May 1919

Passengers
- 1,076 daily (2024)

Services
Preceding station	Taiwan Railway	Following station
Badu Terminus	Eastern Trunk line	Sijiaoting towards Taitung
Location

Nuannuan (Chinese: 暖暖車站; pinyin: Nuǎnnuǎn Chēzhàn) is a railway station on the Taiwan Railway Yilan line located in Nuannuan District, Keelung, Taiwan.

== History ==
The station was opened on 5 May 1919.

== Around the station ==
- Nuannuan Ande Temple
- Nuannuan Sports Park
- Nuannuan Waterfront Park

== See also ==
- List of railway stations in Taiwan
