= Murder of Lucina C. Broadwell =

American murder victim

Lucina Courser Broadwell was murdered in Barre, Vermont, United States on May 4, 1919.

The killing of a 29-year-old mother of three shocked and consumed the community of 17,000 during the summer and fall of 1919. Her death was considered "one of the most horrendous crimes to take place in Vermont up to that time." Mrs. Broadwell's body was buried in Johnson, Vermont, on May 7, 1919. The case continues to inspire writers and theorists.

== Early life ==
Little is known about Lucina Courser Broadwell's early life. Lucina was born on July 26, 1889. She was raised by her parents, Mr. and Mrs. George Courser, in Johnson, Vermont.

In 1910, Lucina married Harry Broadwell, a carpenter, and moved to Barre in 1915. They had three children, Doris, Hildred, and Wendell. At the time of her murder, Lucina was described as "[a] woman . . . of rather slight build, probably not weighing over 110 pounds and being about five feet, three inches tall. She was of rather dark complexion and with regular features with the exception of prominent cheekbones."

== Murder ==
On the morning of May 4, 1919, at approximately 7:30, Harold Jackson, a resident of Brookfield, Vermont, came across Broadwell's body while on a morning walk. The body was lying face down in the Wheelock garden, off North Main Street. When found, the corpse was clothed only in "shoes, stockings, and kid gloves." Her clothing, hat, pocketbook, and Waltham watch were found within several feet of the body. The murder scene has been described as follows:

Her hat was found 8 feet from her body; her Waltham watch 13 feet away, and her empty pocketbook, 5 feet beyond that. The gold watch, with its closed case and clasp, was etched with the initials L.P.C., her maiden name: Lucina Phillips Courser. When thrown from her body, the watch was still running. . . . There were clothes, including what were called "corsets," under the body. A pile of other clothing was tossed in a heap nearby. Some of these articles were torn and when they were picked up, several buttons fell to the ground.

Lucina's hands were tied behind her back with one of her undergarments. A portion of her undergarments and a man's white handkerchief were tied around her neck; it was apparent from the marks on her neck that she had been strangled.

== Investigation ==
The State of Vermont hired James R. Wood, Jr., of the Wood Detective Agency (Boston) to conduct an investigation into the murder. Wood was considered a "Chief Detective" and was considered "the best known detective in New England." Wood and his team had arrived in Barre on May 7, the same day as Lucina's funeral, before her body was transferred to Johnson for burial. At the end of the investigation Wood stated that the Broadwell case was "one of the strongest circumstantial cases ever tried."

When Wood arrived in Barre, he met with Frank C. Archibald, the Vermont Attorney General, and other local officials. It had already been deduced that Lucina had been murdered at the Buzzell Hotel and her body moved to the garden where it was ultimately found. Wood interviewed Harry Broadwell, because at that time, it was largely believed that Harry killed Lucina. Wood, however, quickly dismissed this theory since Harry had "a perfect alibi" for all of his activities the night of the murder. Harry did reveal that he believed his wife was "sporty." Wood quickly identified George R. Long as a person of interest. Long, at that time, was a resident of the Parker house. Harry had told Wood that he suspected Lucina was having an affair with a resident of the Parker house. When initially questioned, Long denied having met Lucina.

Wood also followed another lead provided by Harry Broadwell. Harry had told Wood that Lucina had a good friend by the name of Grace Grimes, who had relocated to the Boston area. Wood immediately had his office locate Grace. When interviewed, Grace confirmed that she often corresponded with Lucina by letter and that her most recent letter was from the day of the murder. In the letter, Lucina wrote about meeting a lodger of Mrs. Isabelle Parker's named George. During the interview with Grace it surfaced that Parker ran a brothel and hosted "so-called cheating parties." Lucina had participated on numerous occasions.

Upon his return to Vermont, Wood interviewed Isabelle Parker, who admitted that Lucina had been at her house the night of the murder and met with Long. There was evidence that Lucina and Long had dinner together and her autopsy showed that she had eaten approximately one hour before her murder. A search of Parker's house revealed the "Famous Red Book", which listed her customers, "many prominent people, both male and female, of Barre, Vermont." Wood deduced how Parker operated her brothel in downtown Barre:

She would go about Barre and get a line of the different men and women who were inclined to be a little sporty. For example, if she knew I was a married man and like to step out, she would make it her business to form my acquaintance and eventually tell me that a certain woman, either married or single, was infatuated with me and would like to meet me. She would invite me down toher [sic] house at a certain time and tell me to come in the back door and when I arrived, would introduce me to some woman, either married or single, whom she had told the same story to that she had told me, namely she would tell the woman that I desired to meet her. In that way she would bring the couples together and they would have their parties there, and naturally the men would pay her something for the use of the room or rooms.

One week after Broadwell's body was found, Wood questioned Long once again. After disclosing what Parker admitted to, Long finally confessed to knowing Lucina, but denied murdering her.

Wood's investigation proved invaluable to the Broadwell prosecution team. It was Wood who found two major clues:

1. A tire track beside the street curb near where the body was found, and
2. The owner of the handkerchief that was tied around Lucina's neck.

The tire track was eventually traced back to a car rented by Long. The handkerchief's owner, Eddie Barron, testified at Long's trial that the handkerchief had been given to Long by Barron.

In addition, Wood's entire interview with Long would also be read to the jury during the trial.

Wood kept very detailed notes. At one point in his report he stated that he "had become disgusted and had left Vermont." He also recorded how the local officials "told me they thought I was crazy and thought I had been on a wild goose chase." Another example of how Wood included details about his own experiences intermixed with his investigation is his discussion of his first night in Vermont:

I then spent the entire night at work alone on this case. I visited the lot where the body was found, visited the Buzzell Hotel, studied the lightening conditions and decided then that Mrs. Broadwell wasnot [sic] killed in the Buzzell Hotel. I returned to the hotel shortly before breakfast, no one knowing that I had been working all night.

== Arrests and trials ==
On May 15, George Long and Isabelle Parker were arrested and taken to the Washington County jail in Montpelier. Arraignments took place on May 16 and both Long and Parker were assigned attorney J. Ward Carver for their defense. Earle Davis represented the State. The grand jury hearing was scheduled for June 5. During the period between the arraignments and the grand jury proceedings, it was found that George Long was actually George Rath, and had only taken the name "Long" before moving to Vermont. It was alleged that he had an extensive criminal record. On June 11, Long and Parker were indicted by the grand jury.

=== Trial of George R. Long ===
George Long's trial began on October 7, 1919, at 9 a.m. with jury selection. On October 10, opening statements were made by the prosecution and the defense, with a courtroom filled to capacity. On October 20, Long's second statement to authorities was read into evidence at the trial. In this statement he admitted to paying Lucina for sexual relations and Mrs. Parker for providing the room. On October 24, Daisy Luce testified that she spoke with George Long the morning that Lucina's body was discovered. During this conversation, Long stated: "There would be one less woman in Barre."

Long's trial lasted one month before it went to the jury. There were a hundred witnesses. In its closing statement, the defense argued that Long had no motive to kill Lucina since they were intimate partners. The prosecution, on the other hand, demonized Long, referring to him as a "thing." The prosecution relied heavily on the circumstantial evidence provided by the Wood Detective Agency. On October 31, the judge gave the jury its instructions. That afternoon, the jury came back with its verdict. At 3:30, the jury announced that George Long was found guilty of the second-degree murder of Lucina C. Broadwell. Sentencing was set for November 5, at which time he was ordered to serve a term of life imprisonment.

After sentencing, Long was moved to the Windsor State Prison to serve his sentence. He appealed his case with exceptions made during the trial. In 1922, the Vermont Supreme Court held in State v. Long that "[t]he record shows a brutal killing--one unmistakably indicating cool depravity of heart and wanton cruelty." Long's appeal was denied.

=== Trial of Isabelle Parker ===
Once the Long trial concluded, Isabelle Parker became the court's focus. Parker, while initially implicated in Lucina's murder, was only charged with "conducting a house of ill fame." Parker pleaded guilty to the charge and was sentenced to two to four years imprisonment. Due to her health, officials allowed her to remain free while she petitioned the governor for clemency. Her petition was denied on April 23, 1920, and she began her sentence on April 26. Parker served two and a half years before her death on September 5, 1922.

== Public interest and legacy ==
Lucina's murder captivated the residents of Barre, and indeed the entire state of Vermont. There were almost daily reports on the murder, its investigation, and the trials of Long and Parker, in the Barre Daily Times throughout the summer and fall of 1919.

In 1990, Richard Bottamini published "The Bawdy House Murder" in The Central Vermont Magazine, which gives a concise history of the murder and the subsequent trial of George Long.

In 2006, Vermont historian Patricia Belding published One Less Woman, a book that chronicles the events following Lucina's murder. Belding's book relies heavily on the newspaper reports of the Barre Daily Times for information regarding the murder and the trials of both Long and Parker. The book also provides pictures of the main players in the book, as well as the actual murder scene.

In a 2020 podcast, Jill Lepore, a history professor at Harvard University and a writer for The New Yorker magazine, revisited the case and the original file transcripts and concluded that whether he was guilty or not, Long was convicted on moral grounds: not because of any material evidence, but because he had provided a contraceptive to Mrs. Broadwell, had sex with her, and lied about it.

== See also ==
- Barre (city), Vermont
- Johnson, VT
- State v. Long, 95 Vt. 485, 115 A. 734 (1922), for the Vermont Supreme Court's ruling on George Long's appeal.
