= Daniel Bell =

American sociologist, writer, editor, and professor (1919–2011)

- Born: Daniel Bolotsky; May 10, 1919; New York City, New York, U.S.
- Died: January 25, 2011 (aged 91); Cambridge, Massachusetts, U.S.
- Education: City College of New York Columbia University
- Known for: Post-industrialism
- Scientific career
- Fields: Sociology
- Workplaces: University of Chicago; Columbia University; Harvard University
- Doctoral students: Mustafa Emirbayer

Signature
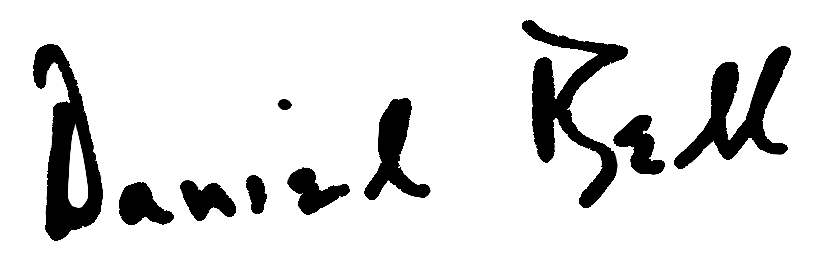

Daniel Bell (né Bolotsky; May 10, 1919 – January 25, 2011) was an American sociologist, writer, editor, and professor at Harvard University, best known for his contributions to the study of post-industrialism. He has been described as "one of the leading American intellectuals of the postwar era". His three best known works are The End of Ideology (1960), The Coming of Post-Industrial Society (1973), and The Cultural Contradictions of Capitalism (1976).

== Early life ==
Daniel Bell was born in 1919 on the Lower East Side of Manhattan in New York City. His parents, Benjamin and Anna Bolotsky, were Jewish immigrants, originally from Eastern Europe. They worked in the garment industry. His father died when he was eight months old, and he grew up poor, living with relatives along with his mother and his older brother Leo. When he was 13 years old, the family's name was changed from Bolotsky to Bell.

== Education ==
Bell graduated from Stuyvesant High School. He received a bachelor's degree from the City College of New York in 1938, and completed graduate work at Columbia University during the 1938–1939 academic year. He received a PhD in sociology from Columbia in 1961 after he was permitted to submit The End of Ideology: On the Exhaustion of Political Ideas in the Fifties (a 1960 essay collection), instead of a conventional doctoral dissertation.

== Career ==
Bell began his professional life as a journalist, being managing editor of The New Leader magazine (1941–1945), labor editor of Fortune (1948–1958), and later, co-editor (with his college friend Irving Kristol) of The Public Interest magazine (1965–1973). In the late 1940s, Bell was an instructor in the Social Sciences in the college of the University of Chicago. During the 1950s, it was close to the Congress for Cultural Freedom. Subsequently, he taught sociology, first at Columbia (1959–1969) and then at Harvard until his retirement in 1990. He was elected a Fellow of the American Academy of Arts and Sciences in 1964 and a member of the American Philosophical Society in 1978.

Bell also was the visiting Pitt Professor of American History and Institutions at Cambridge University in 1987. He served as a member of the President's Commission on Technology in 1964–1965 and as a member of the President's Commission on a National Agenda for the 1980s in 1979.

Bell served on the board of advisors for the Antioch Review, and published some of his most acclaimed essays in the magazine: "Crime as an American Way of Life" (1953), "Socialism: The Dream and the Reality" (1952), "Japanese Notebook" (1958), "Ethics and Evil: Frameworks for Twenty-First Century Culture" (2005), and "The Reconstruction of Liberal Education: A Foundational Syllabus" (2011).

Bell received honorary degrees from Harvard, the University of Chicago, and fourteen other universities in the United States, as well as from Edinburgh Napier University and Keio University in Japan. He also received a Lifetime Achievement Award from the American Sociological Association in 1992, and the Talcott Parsons Prize for the Social Sciences from the American Academy of Arts and Sciences in 1993. He was given the Tocqueville Award by the French government in 1995.

Bell was a director of Suntory Foundation and a scholar in residence of the American Academy of Arts and Sciences.

Bell once described himself as "a socialist in economics, a liberal in politics, and a conservative in culture."

== Scholarship ==
Bell is best known for his contributions to post-industrialism. His most influential books are, The End of Ideology (1960), The Cultural Contradictions of Capitalism (1976), and The Coming of Post-Industrial Society (1973). The End of Ideology and The Cultural Contradictions of Capitalism were listed by the Times Literary Supplement as among the 100 most important books in the second half of the twentieth century. Besides Bell, only Isaiah Berlin, Claude Lévi-Strauss, Albert Camus, George Orwell, and Hannah Arendt had two books so listed.

=== The End of Ideology ===
In The End of Ideology (1960), Bell suggests that the older grand humanistic ideologies, derived from the nineteenth and early twentieth centuries, are exhausted and that new more parochial ideologies will soon arise. With the rise of affluent welfare states and institutionalized bargaining between different groups, Bell maintains, revolutionary movements that aim to overthrow liberal democracy will no longer be able to attract the working classes.

=== The Coming of Post-Industrial Society ===
In The Coming of Post-Industrial Society: A Venture in Social Forecasting (1973), Bell outlined a new kind of society, the post-industrial society. He argued that post-industrialism would be information-led and service-oriented. Bell also argued that the post-industrial society would replace the industrial society as the dominant system.

There are three components to a post-industrial society, according to Bell:

- a shift from manufacturing to services,
- the centrality of the new science-based industries,
- the rise of new technical elites and the advent of a new principle of stratification.

Bell also conceptually differentiates between three aspects of the post-industrial society: data, or information describing the empirical world; information, or the organization of that data into meaningful systems and patterns such as statistical analysis; and knowledge, which Bell conceptualizes as the use of information to make judgments. Bell discussed the manuscript of The Coming of Post-Industrial Society with Talcott Parsons before its publication.

=== The Cultural Contradictions of Capitalism ===
In The Cultural Contradictions of Capitalism (1976), Bell contends that the developments of twentieth-century capitalism have led to a contradiction between the cultural sphere of consumerist instant self-gratification and the demand, in the economic sphere, for hard-working, productive individuals. Bell articulates this through his "three realms" methodology, which divides modern society into the cultural, economic, and political spheres.

Bell's concern is that, with the growth of the welfare state throughout the post-war years, more and more of the population demand that the state fulfil the hedonistic desires which the cultural sphere encourages. That dovetails with the ongoing requirement for the state to maintain the kind of strong economic environment conducive to continual growth. For Bell, the competing, contradictory demands place excessive strain on the state that was manifest in the economic turbulence, fiscal pressure, and political upheaval characteristic of the 1970s. Written at a time of significant shifts in U.S. politics, The Cultural Contradictions of Capitalism offers reasons for the crisis of post-war liberalism.

== Personal life ==
His first two marriages, to Nora Potashnick and Elaine Graham, ended in divorce. In 1960, Bell married Pearl Kazin, a scholar of literary criticism, and sister of Alfred Kazin. She was also Jewish. Bell's son, David Bell, is a professor of French history at Princeton University, and his daughter, Jordy Bell, was an academic administrator and teacher of, among other things, U.S. Women's history at Marymount College, Tarrytown, New York, before her retirement in 2005.

He died at home in Cambridge, Massachusetts on January 25, 2011.

== Works ==
Articles

- "The Coming Tragedy of American Labor." Politics, March 1944.
- "The World of Moloch." Politics, May 1944, pp. 111–113. Full Issue available.
- "The Subversion of Collective Bargaining." Commentary, March 1960, pp. 697–713.
- "The Revolution of Rising Entitlement." Fortune, 1975.

Books (authored)

- Work and Its Discontents: The Cult of Efficiency in America. Boston: Beacon Press, 1956.
- The End of Ideology: On the Exhaustion of Political Ideas in the Fifties. New York: Free Press, 1960.
- The Reforming of General Education. Garden City, NY: Doubleday Anchor, 1966.
- The Coming of Post-Industrial Society: A Venture in Social Forecasting. New York: Basic Books, 1973.
- The Cultural Contradictions of Capitalism. New York: Basic Books, 1976.
  - Las Contradicciones Culturales Del Capitalismo. Translated by Néster A Míguez. Mexico: Editorial Patria, 1994.
- The Winding Passage: Essays and Sociological Journeys, 1960–1980. Cambridge, Massachusetts: Abt Books, 1980.
- The Social Sciences Since the Second World War. Piscataway, NJ: Transaction Books, 1982.

Books (edited)

- The New American Right. New York: Criterion Books, 1955.
- The Radical Right: The New American Right Expanded and Updated. New York: Doubleday, 1964.
- Confrontation: The Student Rebellion and the Universities. Edited with Irving Kristol. National Affairs, Inc., 1968.
- Capitalism Today. Edited with Irving Kristol. New York: New American Library, 1971.
- The Crisis in Economic Theory. Edited with Irving Kristol. New York: Basic Books, 1981.

Books contributions

- "Marxian Socialism in the United States" (Chapter 6). Socialism and American Life, edited by Donald Drew Egbert & Stow Persons. Princeton, New Jersey: Princeton University Press, 1952.
- "Interpretations of American Politics" (Chapter 1). The New American Right, edited by Daniel Bell. New York: Criterion Books, 1955, pp. 3–32.
- "The Dispossessed" (Chapter 1). The Radical Right: The New American Right Expanded and Updated, edited by Daniel Bell. New York: Doubleday, 1964, pp. 1–38.
- "Work, Alienation and Social Control". The Radical Papers, edited by Irving Howe. New York: Doubleday, 1966, pp. 86–98.
- "Models and Reality in Economic Discourse" (Chapter 4). The Crisis in Economic Theory, edited by Daniel Bell & Irving Kristol. New York: Basic Books, 1981.

Published lectures

- The Deficits: How Big? How Long? How Dangerous? The Joseph I. Living Memorial Lecture Series, No. 2. New York University Press, 1986.

== See also ==
- Late capitalism
- Neoconservatism
- The New York Intellectuals
