= The End of Ideology =

1960 book by Daniel Bell

The End of Ideology: On the Exhaustion of Political Ideas in the Fifties
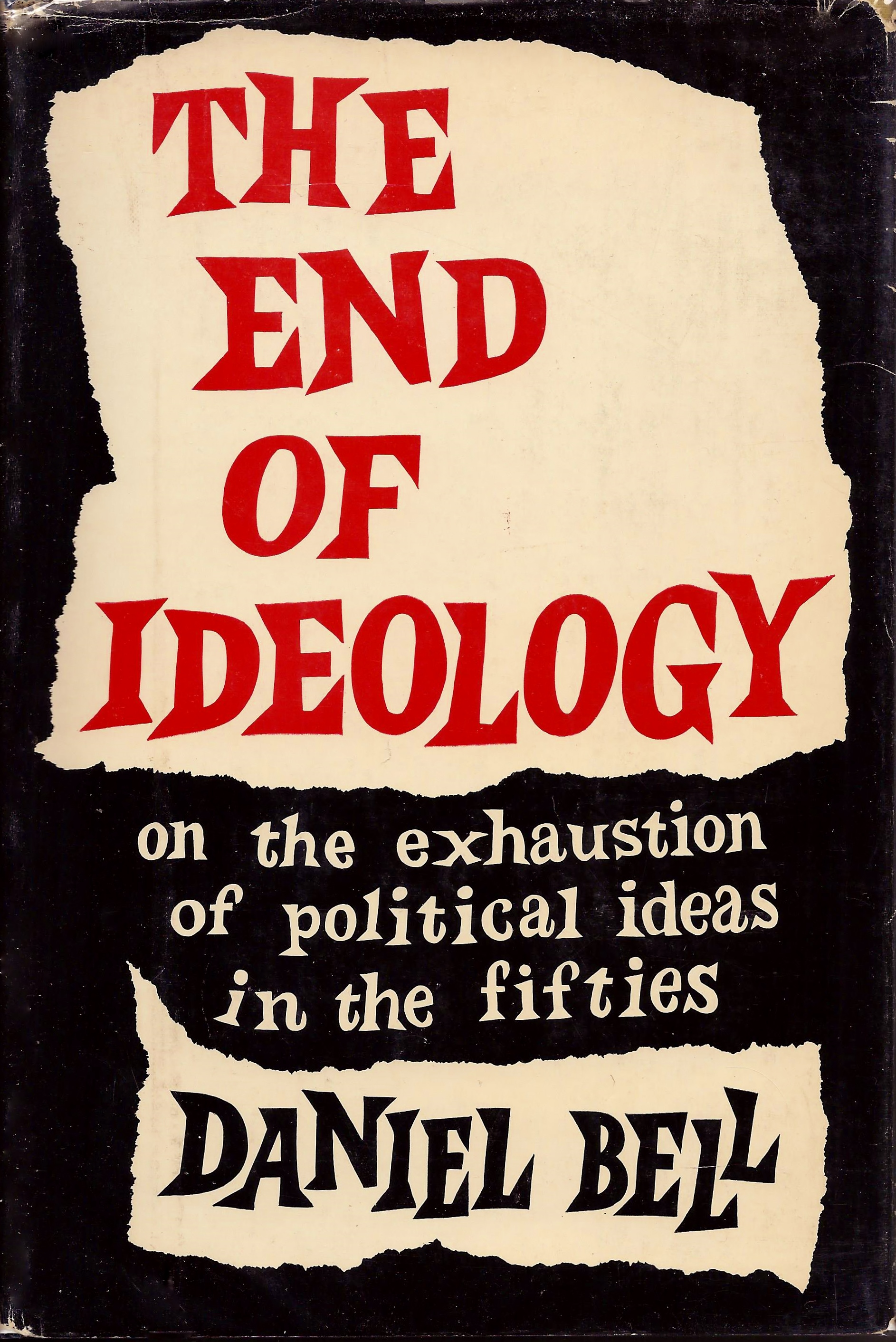
- First edition
- Author: Daniel Bell
- Genre: Non-fiction
- Publisher: Free Press
- Publication date: 1960

The End of Ideology: On the Exhaustion of Political Ideas in the Fifties is a collection of essays published in 1960 (New York, 2nd ed. 1962) by Daniel Bell, who described himself as a "socialist in economics, a liberal in politics, and a conservative in culture." He suggests that the older, grand-humanistic ideologies derived from the nineteenth and early twentieth centuries had been exhausted and that new, more parochial ideologies would soon arise. He argues that political ideology has become irrelevant among "sensible" people and that the polity of the future would be driven by piecemeal technological adjustments of the extant system. With the rise of affluent welfare states and institutionalized bargaining between different groups, Bell maintains, revolutionary movements which aim to overthrow liberal democracy will no longer be able to attract the working classes.

== Theory ==
A thread in 1930s literature derived from debates about the continued relevance of the Marxist scheme of class-generated ideologies, even in the less reductionist version set forth in most of Karl Mannheim's "Ideology and Utopia." However, his essay on "Utopia" does envision a loss of both utopian and ideological vision. Fascism rather than communism initially posed the question, insofar as the simplification of Fascism as "ideology" of the capitalist class lost credibility.

One current of thought took up the theme of "mass society" and contended that the modes of control and resistance both had little to do with the ideology concept (Emil Lederer, "The State of Mass Society"). Although much of this was conjoined with conservative arguments about the "revolt of the masses," there was also a current that looked to pragmatic problem solving where Fascism (and increasingly Communism) could be resisted or contained. Mannheim's "planning" writings ambiguously fostered this trend. Daniel Bell belonged to the next generation, when ideas about the institutionalisation of intelligence in ordinary democratic political processes became more sophisticated, as in the work of "pluralist" political theorists like David Truman, Robert Dahl and Daniel Bell. Technocratic notions at home on the Right played little part.

== See also ==
- The End of History and the Last Man
- Francis Fukuyama
- Jürgen Habermas
