= Nuannuan District =

District of Keelung, Taiwan

Coordinates: 25.087465°N 121.748058°E

Nuannuan 暖暖區 Nuan Nuan
- District
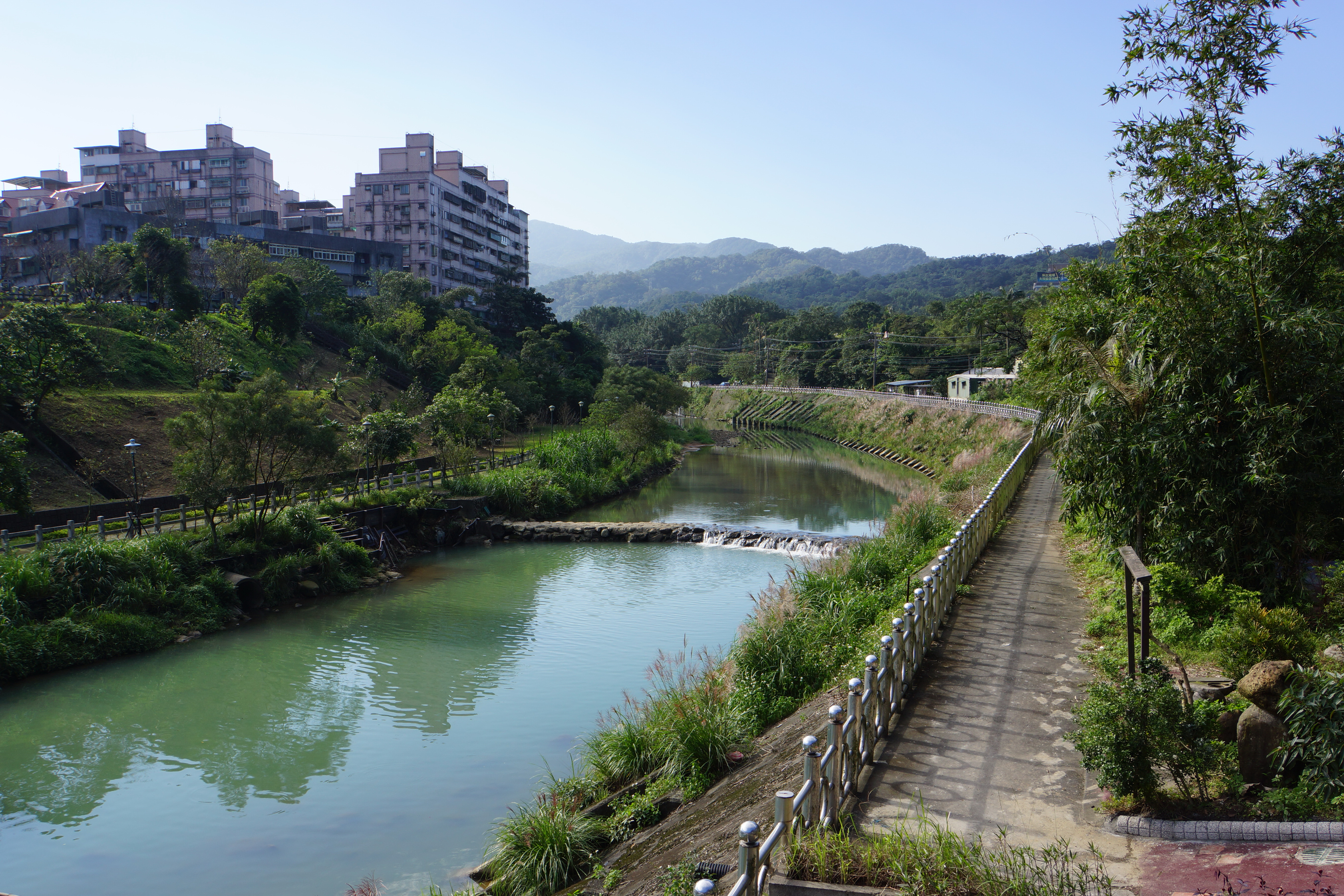

- Nuannuan District in Keelung City
- Location: Keelung, Taiwan
- Urban villages: 13

Government
  - Leader (區長): Chun Tang Tsai (蔡春堂)

Area
  - Total: 22.8283 km^{2} (8.8141 sq mi)

Population (October 2023)
  - Total: 38,455
  - Density: 1,684.5/km^{2} (4,362.9/sq mi)
- Time zone: UTC+8 (National Standard Time)
- Postal code: 205
- Website: www.klnn.klcg.gov.tw (in Chinese)

Nuannuan District (Chinese: 暖暖區; pinyin: Nuǎnnuǎn Qū; Pe̍h-ōe-jī: Loán-loán-khu), also Nuan Nuan, is a district of the city of Keelung, Taiwan.

== History ==
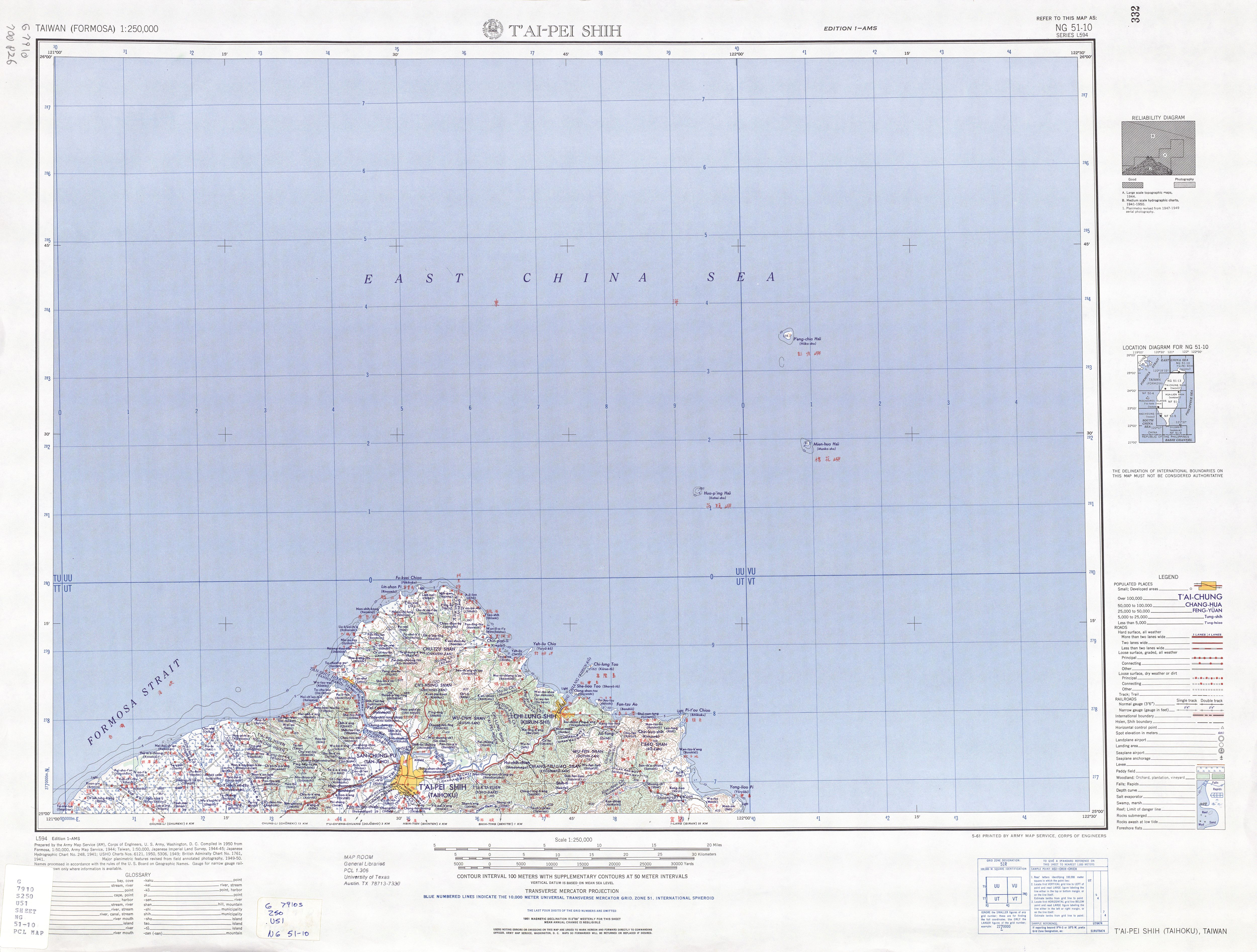
Map including Nuannuan (labeled as Nuan-nuan (Dandan)) (1950)

During the period of Japanese rule, Shichitoku village (七堵庄) included modern day Nuannuan and Qidu District and was governed under Kīrun District (基隆郡) of Taihoku Prefecture.

== Geography ==
- Area: 22.8283 km^{2}
- Population: 38,455 people (October 2023)

== Administrative divisions ==
The district consists of thirteen urban villages:

- Baxi/Basi (八西里), Badu (八堵里), Banan (八南里), Guogang (過港里), Dingnei (碇內里), Dinghe (碇和里), Nuantong (暖同里), Nuannuan (暖暖里), Nuandong/Nuantung (暖東里), Nuanxi/Nuansi (暖西里), Bazhong/Bajhong (八中里), Dingan/Ding-an/Ding'an (碇安里) and Dingxiang/Dingsiang (碇祥里) Village.

== Tourist attractions ==
- Nuannuan Ande Temple (暖暖安德宮)
- Chinshan Temple (金山寺)
- Haihue Temple
- Hsishih Reservoir
- Nuannuan Sport Park
- Nuantung Nursery Garden
- Nuantung Nursery Garden Farm Park
- Potholes at Nuanchiang Bridge

== Transportation ==
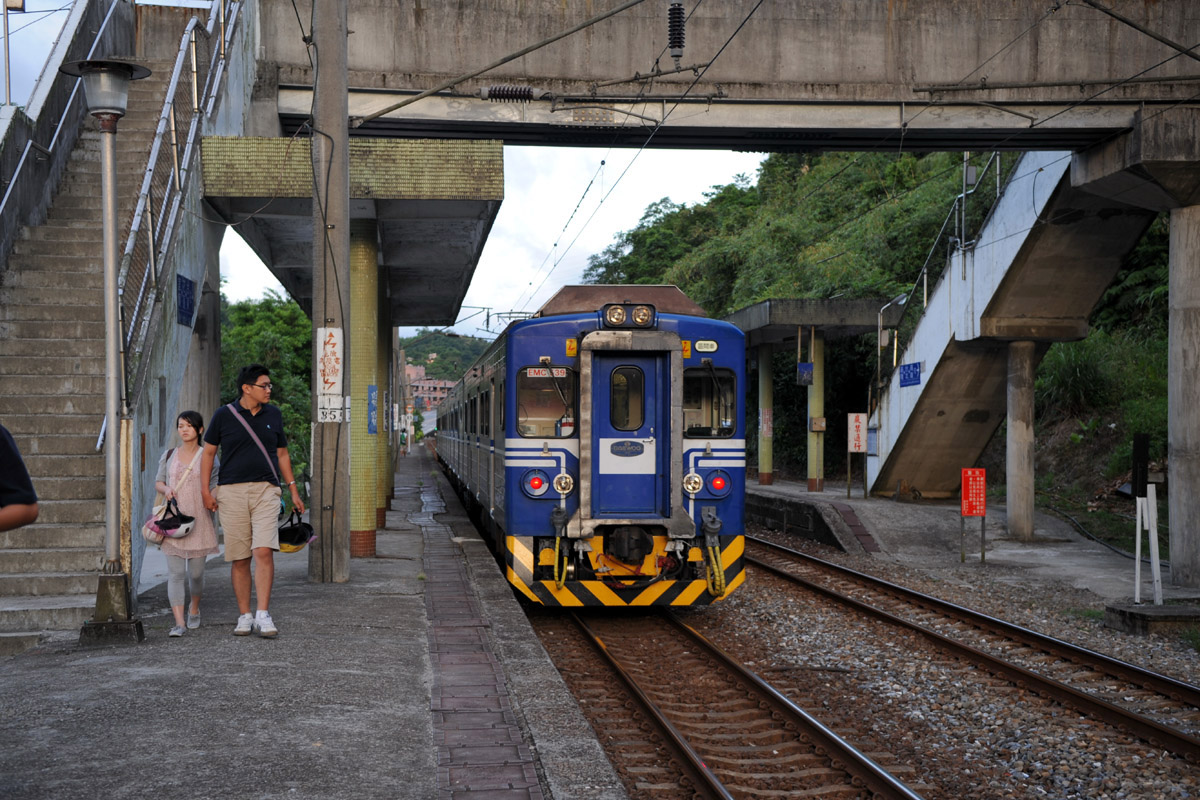
Nuannuan Station

- TR Badu Station
- TR Nuannuan Station

== Notable natives ==
- Jiang Yi-huah, Premier of the Republic of China (2013–2014)

== See also ==
- Keelung
