= April 1919 =

Month in 1919

<<	April 1919					>>
Su	Mo	Tu	We	Th	Fr	Sa
		1	2	3	4	5
6	7	8	9	10	11	12
13	14	15	16	17	18	19
20	21	22	23	24	25	26
27	28	29	30

The following events occurred in April 1919:

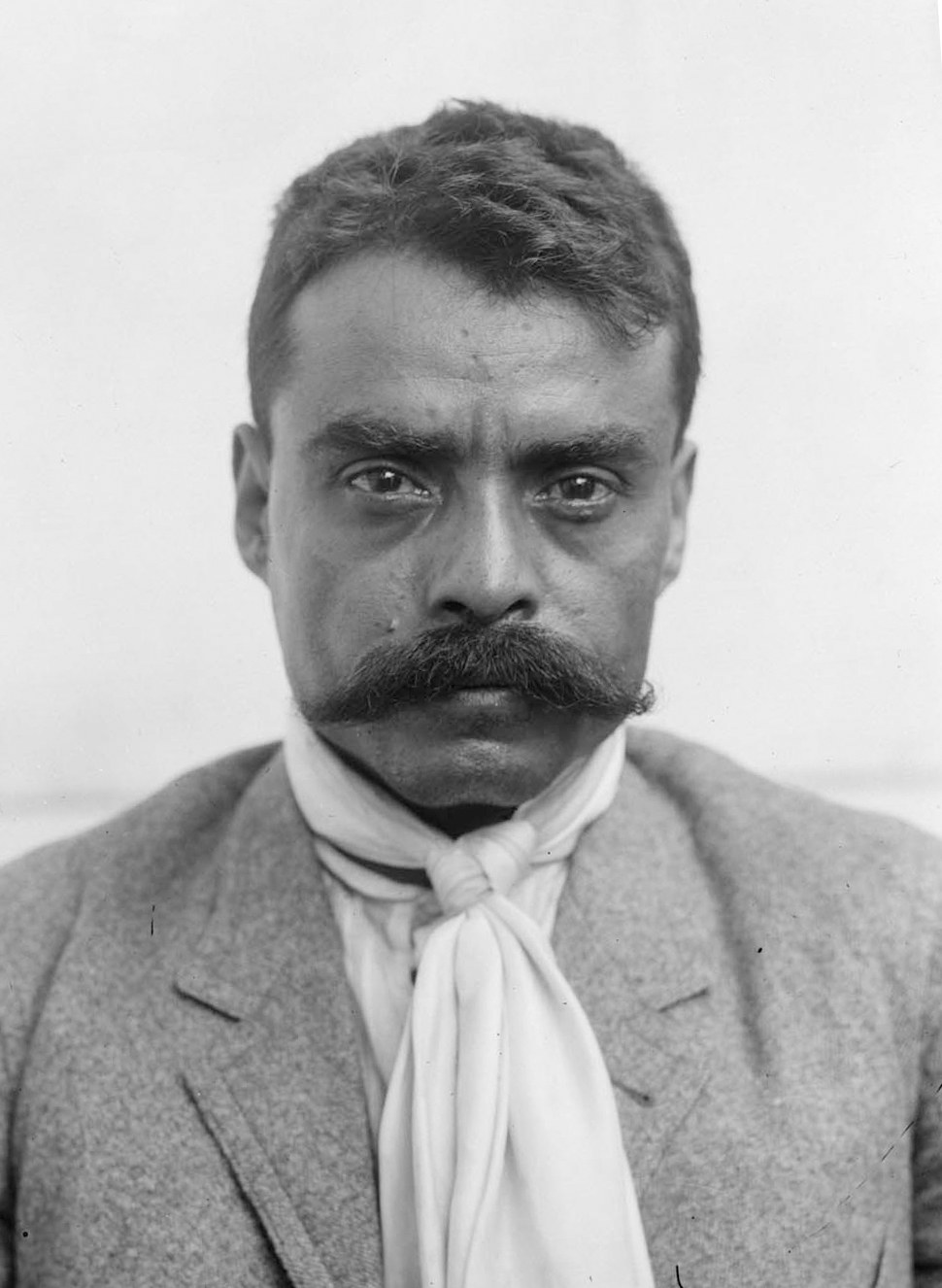
Mexican revolutionary leader Emiliano Zapata, assassinated in Chinameca, Morelos, Mexico.

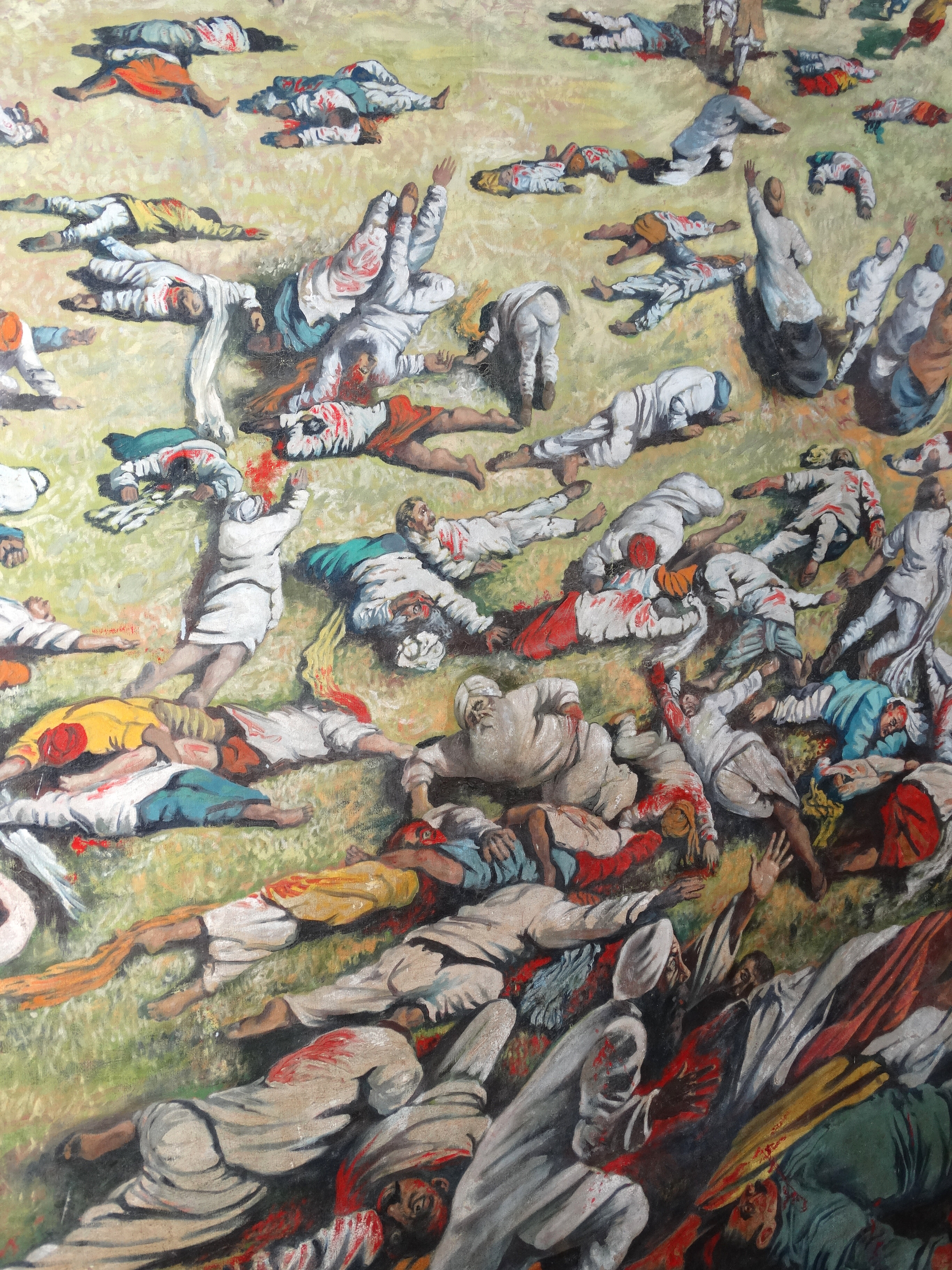
Mural depicting the Jallianwala Bagh massacre, in Amritsar, India.

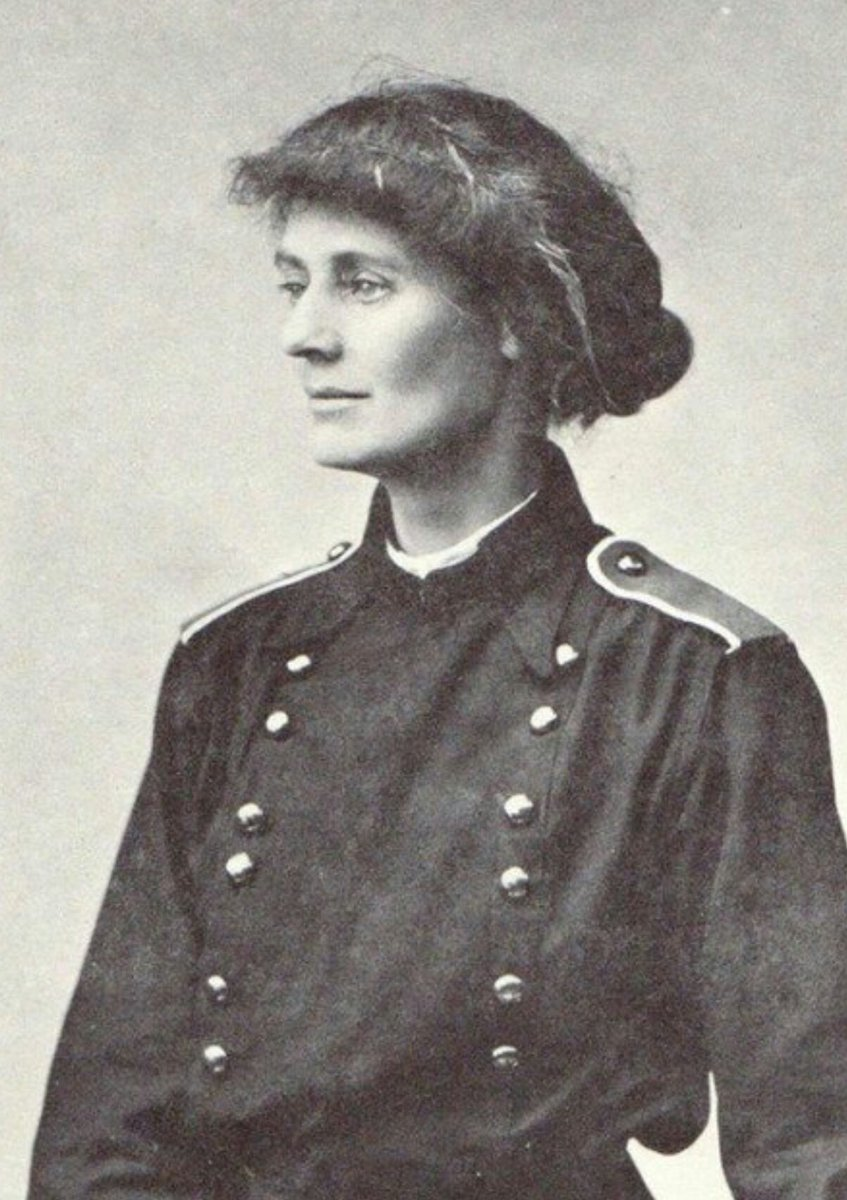
Constance Markievicz, first woman to hold government cabinet position in Western Europe

== April 1, 1919 (Tuesday) ==
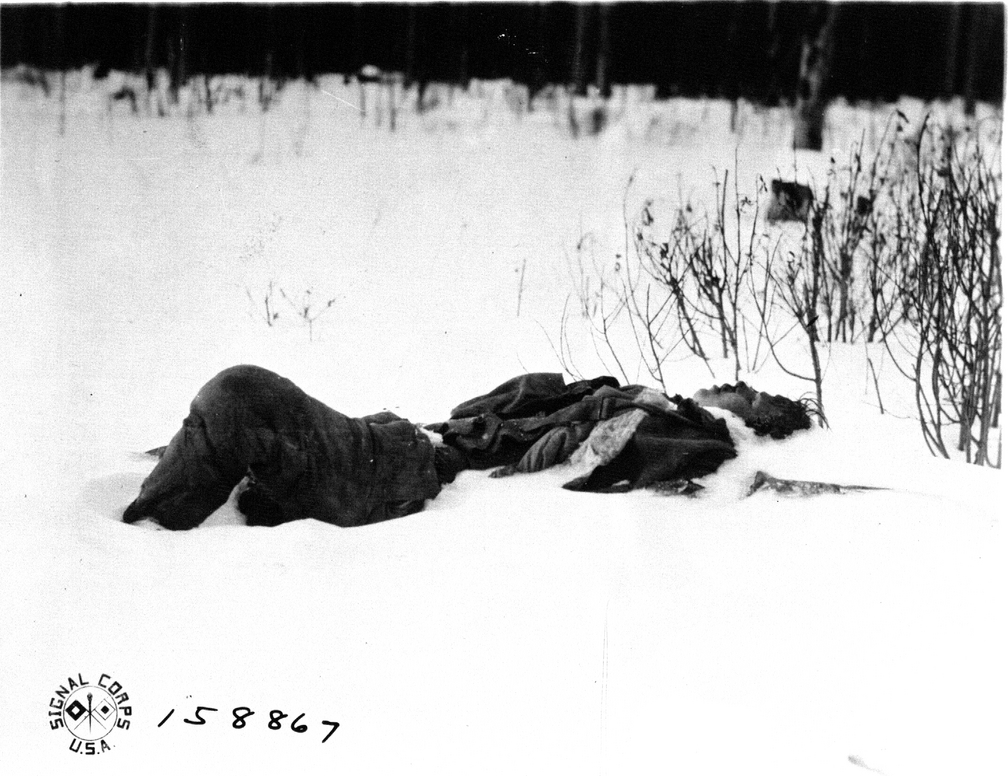
A dead Red Army soldier during the Battle of Bolshie Ozerki.

- Battle for the Donbass – The Ninth Red Army counterattacked the White armies in the Donbas region.
- Battle of Bolshie Ozerki – A Red Army force of 7,000 men attacked a defending Allied force of 2,000 at the village of Bolshie Ozerki near the port of Onega, Russia, but were held back by artillery and machine gun fire.
- About 160,000 miners in the Ruhr of Germany went on strike.
- Fifty-two members of Sinn Féin attended the second meeting of Dáil Éireann. Seán T. O'Kelly was elected Ceann Comhairle and Éamon de Valera was elected President of Dáil Éireann.
- The University of Hamburg was established, with doors officially opening on May 10.
- The military charity RAF Benevolent Fund was established by Chief of the Air Staff Hugh Trenchard to support serving and former members of the Royal Air Force.
- The Silesian Workers Newspaper was first published Breslau, Germany (now part of Poland) to be the organ for the Independent Social Democratic Party of Germany.
- Football clubs were established in the following cities: Slovan Bratislava in Bratislava, Slovakia, and Lübeck in Lübeck, Germany.
- The municipality of Palakollu was established in Andhra Pradesh, India.
- The borough of Waldwick, New Jersey was established.
- Pondera County, Montana was established with its county seat in Conrad.
- Born:
  - Joseph Murray, American surgeon, recipient of the Nobel Prize in Physiology or Medicine for performing the first successful kidney transplant; in Milford, Massachusetts, United States (d. 2012)
  - Jeannie Rousseau, French intelligence officer, member of Operation Amniarix which collected intelligence on the V-1 and V-2 rocket programs, recipient of the Legion of Honour, Resistance Medal, and Croix de Guerre; in Saint-Brieuc, France (d. 2017)
  - James MacLachlan, British air force pilot, commander of the No. 1 Squadron during World War II, recipient of the Distinguished Service Order, Distinguished Flying Cross, and War Cross; in Styal, England (d. 1943, killed in action)

== April 2, 1919 (Wednesday) ==
- The Red Army occupied the Crimea, where it dissolved the Crimean Regional Government and replaced it with the Crimean Socialist Soviet Republic a month later.
- Battle of Bolshie Ozerki – An Allied counteroffensive against the Red Army at Bolshie Ozerki, Russia failed to dislodge the enemy's positions.
- Constance Markievicz was appointed Minister for Labour, becoming the first Irish female cabinet minister and the first in Western Europe.(albeit in a cabinet which was not recognised by Britain.)
- The Irish Republic government established the Department of Agriculture with Robert Barton as minister, and the Department of Local Government with W. T. Cosgrave as minister.
- Born: Delfo Cabrera, Argentine athlete, gold medalist at the 1948 Summer Olympics; in Armstrong, Santa Fe, Argentina (d. 1981)

== April 3, 1919 (Thursday) ==
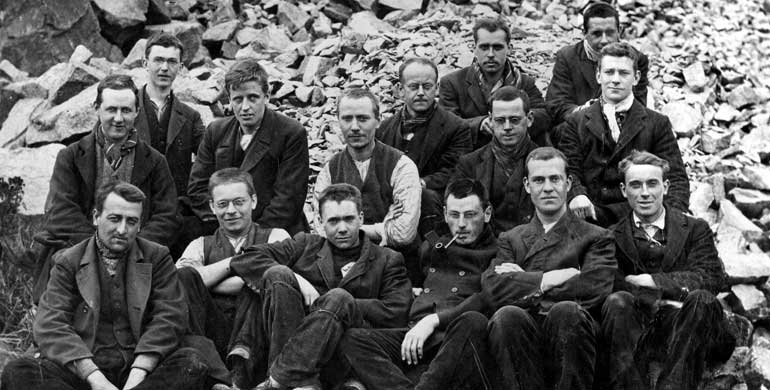
Members of the Richmond Sixteen, from 1916, released from prison three years later.

- The Habsburg Law was passed that legally dethroned the House of Habsburg as the monarchy of Austria.
- The British government began releasing a group of "absolutist" conscientious objectors known as the Richmond Sixteen, named after Richmond Castle in Richmond, North Yorkshire, England where they had been imprisoned for disobeying orders to report to the Non-Combatant Corps of the British Army in 1916.
- A Farman Goliath carried 14 passengers to an altitude of 6,200 meters (20,341 feet) in a flight to publicize commercial air service.
- The Apostolic Vicariate of Nouvelle-Anvers was established in the Belgian Congo, on territory split off from the then Apostolic Vicariate of Léopoldville. It later became the Roman Catholic Diocese of Lisala in 1959.
- Born:
  - Ervin Drake, American songwriter, known for hits "I Believe" and "It Was a Very Good Year"; as Ervin Maurice Druckman, in New York City, United States (d. 2015)
  - John C. Meyer, American air force officer, 7th commander-in-chief of the Strategic Air Command, recipient of the three Distinguished Service Crosses, seven Distinguished Flying Crosses, 15 Air Medals and the Legion of Merit; in New York City, United States (d. 1975)

== April 4, 1919 (Friday) ==
- South African delegate Jan Smuts visited Hungary and told its soviet government that if the government operated with the guidelines set down at the Paris Peace Conference, the Allies would lift the blockade against the country. However, foreign minister Béla Kun refused the terms and negotiations ceased.
- The 58th Infantry Division of the British Army was disbanded along with its mortar brigade.
- Died:
  - Francisco Marto, 10, Portuguese peasant, claimed to witness apparitions of the Blessed Virgin Mary in 1917 at Fátima, Portugal, canonized as a saint in 2017; died of Spanish flu (b. 1908)
  - William Crookes, 86, British chemist and physicist, developer of the vacuum tube (b. 1832)

== April 5, 1919 (Saturday) ==
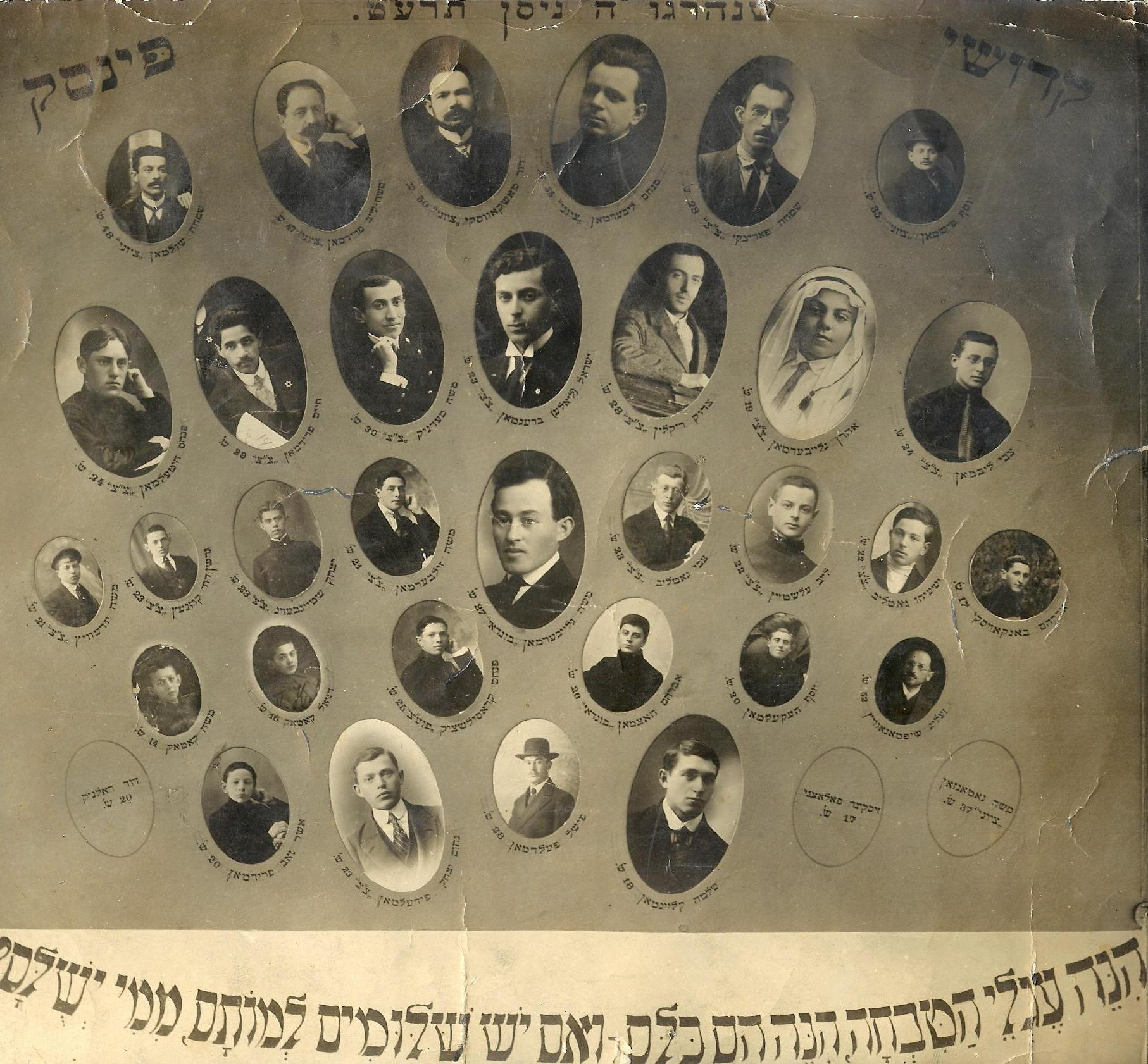
Photographs of Jews in Pinsk, Poland who were executed without trial for alleged Bolshevik activities.

- Battle of Bolshie Ozerki – Weakened by casualties totaling 2,000 men, the Red Army withdrew from the village Bolshie Ozerki, allowing the Allies to eventually retreat from Arkhangelsk, Russia.
- Thirty-five Jews were executed without trial in Pinsk, Poland after being accused of organizing an illegal Bolshevik rally.
- The last of the British force involved in the Malleson mission left the Transcaspian region, bordering Russia. Soviet forces were eventually able to invade the region and take complete control by 1920.
- Two pilots with the French Air Force, who on January 26 made a double crossing of the Mediterranean Sea in a Bréguet airplane, made a flight from Lyon to Rome, and then to Nice in the same aircraft. The pair would fly the same plane later in the year and set a French flight distance record, flying 1,900 km (1,200 mi) from Le Bourget Airport in Paris to Kenitra, French Morocco.
- Former army officer Eugen Bircher established the far right Swiss Patriotic Federation to counter perceived unrest in Switzerland caused by immigration.
- Born:
  - Les Munro, New Zealand air force officer, commander of the No. 617 Squadron and member of Operation Chastise during World War II, recipient of the New Zealand Order of Merit, Distinguished Service Order, Distinguished Flying Cross and Legion of Honour; as John Leslie Munro, in Gisborne, New Zealand (d. 2015)
  - Lester James Peries, Sri Lankan film-maker, known for films such as Line of Destiny, The Silent Heart, and Mansion by the Lake; in Dehiwala, British Ceylon (present-day Sri Lanka) (d. 2018)

== April 6, 1919 (Sunday) ==
- A Soviet rebellion led by German anarchists in Munich dissolved the People's State of Bavaria, and forced its leader Johannes Hoffmann to flee and establish a rival socialist government in Bamberg, Germany.
- Spring offensive of the White Army – The Western Army of the White Movement captured Sterlitamak, Russia on the Eastern Front of the Russian Civil War.
- The Irish Republican Army attempted to liberate member Robert Byrne, who was under arrest by the Royal Irish Constabulary in a Limerick hospital due to a hunger strike. The rescue attempt failed, resulting in the deaths of Byrne and a police officer. The same day, a police patrol was ambushed at Eyeries, Ireland and three officers were shot and wounded.
- The Māori Battalion for the New Zealand Expeditionary Force formally returned Auckland for a commemoration ceremony before it was disbanded.
- Italian cyclist Angelo Gremo won the 12th edition of the Milan–San Remo cycling race, completing the 286 km race route in 11 hours, 26 minutes.
- The Racing Club de Montevideo, a football club, was established in Montevideo.
- Born: Caren Marsh Doll, American actress, stand-in for Judy Garland in The Wizard of Oz and Ziegfeld Girl; as Aileen Betty Morris, in Hollywood, Los Angeles, United States

== April 7, 1919 (Monday) ==
- Anarchist writers Ernst Toller, Gustav Landauer and Erich Mühsam co-founded the Bavarian Soviet Republic, being later joined by essayist and debt relief advocate Silvio Gesell.
- Spring offensive of the White Army – The Western Army of the White Movement captured Belebey, Russia.
- Estonia held elections during the Estonian War of Independence, with the Estonian Social Democratic Workers' Party winning a majority of the seats of the Estonian Constituent Assembly.
- The 21st Aero Squadron of the United States Army Air Service was disbanded at Hazelhurst Field in Mineola, New York.
- The French Football Federation was established in Paris as the governing body of professional association football clubs in France and its overseas colonies.
- The Haugesund Naval Air Station was officially disbanded in Avaldsnes, Norway.
- The Original Dixieland Jazz Band introduced Dixieland jazz to England with a 15-month tour, starting with a performance at the Hippodrome in London.
- King Albert issued a royal decree that established the King Albert Medal to be awarded to Belgian citizens or foreigners that were involved in promoting or organizing charitable or humanitarian aid to Belgians during World War I.
- Born:
  - Al Lerner, American composer, known for his themes for the television talk how Tonight Starring Jack Paar and film scores such as The Eddy Duchin Story; in Cleveland, United States (d. 2014)
  - Edoardo Mangiarotti, Italian fencer, six time gold medalist including the 1956 Summer Olympics and six-time silver medalist including the 1952 Summer Olympics; in Renate, Kingdom of Italy (present-day Italy) (d. 2012)
- Died:
  - Virginia P. Bacon, 65-66, American art dealer, noted executor of the Edward R. Bacon art collection, granddaughter of Cornelius Vanderbilt (b. 1845)
  - Aureliano Blanquet, 69, Mexican army officer, key participant in the Ten Tragic Days in Mexico City; killed in action (b. 1849)

== April 8, 1919 (Tuesday) ==
- Louis J. Wilde retained his seat as mayor of San Diego during city elections.
- Born: Ian Smith, Rhodesian state leader, 8th Prime Minister of Rhodesia; in Selukwe, Southern Rhodesia (present-day Shurugwi, Zimbabwe) (d. 2007)
- Died:
  - Frank Winfield Woolworth, 66, American business leader, founder of the F. W. Woolworth Company; died of septic shock (b. 1852)
  - Thomas Chapman, 72, British landowner, last of the Chapman baronets, father of T. E. Lawrence (b. 1846)
  - Loránd Eötvös, 70, Hungarian physicist, best known for his research on gravity and surface tension (b. 1848)

== April 9, 1919 (Wednesday) ==
- An overnight tornado outbreak in the Southern Great Plains killed at least 92 people in Texas, Oklahoma and Arkansas.
- Spring offensive of the White Army – The Orenburg Independent Army took Sarapul from the Red Army and closed in on Glazov, while the Western Army took Bugulma, Russia.
- In response to activity by Irish Republican Army in Limerick, the British Army declared the city a Special Military Area. Civilians were required to apply for police permits to enter or leave the city.
- The vote was extended to women in British East Africa, of "pure European descent", provided they were English-speaking, literate British subjects and owned property, so the law could exclude Africans, British Indians and other ethnic groups.
- The 3rd Legions Infantry Division was established by the Polish Army.
- The Logistics Battalion was established in Tallinn, Estonia.
- Born: J. Presper Eckert, American engineer, co-designer of the ENIAC and UNIVAC computers; as John Adam Presper Eckert Jr., in Philadelphia, United States (d. 1995)

== April 10, 1919 (Thursday) ==
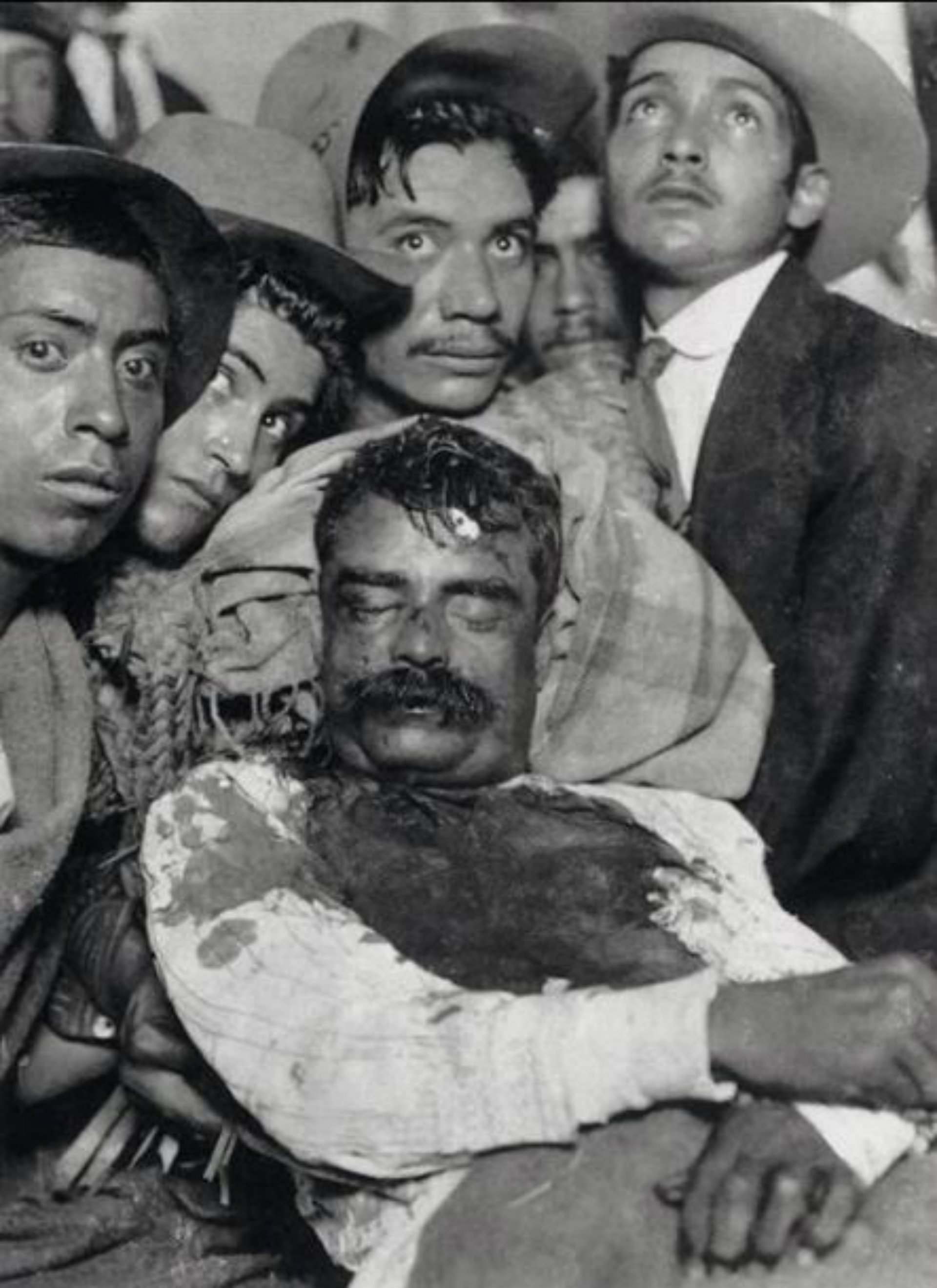
Corpse of Emiliano Zapata, photographed after his assassination April 10, 1919.

- Spring offensive of the White Army – The Siberian Army captured the town of Orsk and began to advance on Orenburg, Russia.
- Mexican Revolution leader Emiliano Zapata was ambushed and shot dead in Morelos by soldiers under command of Jesus Guajardo, a subordinate to General Pablo González Garza of the Constitutional Army.
- A motion was passed during the third meeting of the Dáil Éireann to ostracize the Royal Irish Constabulary.
- Quebec held a referendum on the prohibition of alcohol, with the side for legalization of sales of beer, cider and wine winning with 78% of the vote, while the sale of spirits remains prohibited until 1921.
- The United States Army Air Service disbanded the 2nd Pursuit Group at the Toul-Croix de Metz Airfield in France.
- The 54th and 56th Australian Battalions were disbanded.
- The Persian weekly newspaper Flame of the Revolution began publication in Samarkand, Turkestan (now Uzbekistan). Despite being the sole Persian-language newspaper in the country, the newspaper folded in 1921 after 90 issues.
- The borough of Brielle, New Jersey was established.

== April 11, 1919 (Friday) ==
- The Provisional Government of the Republic of Korea was established as a government-in-exile, although Korea remained under Japanese influence until the end of World War II.
- Paris Peace Conference – Japan introduced the Racial Equality Proposal which advocated for an international standard on human rights. Both France and Italy supported adopting the proposal, while the United Kingdom opposed it. Despite achieving a majority by the peace delegation, chairman Woodrow Wilson overturned it since there was still significant opposition to it.
- Riots broke out in Ahmedabad, British India.
- The 53rd and 55th Australian Battalions were disbanded.
- The 221st Mixed Brigade of the British Army was disbanded.
- French pianist Marguerite Long performed the public debut of the composition Le Tombeau de Couperin by Maurice Ravel in Paris.
- Born: Hugh Carey, American politician, 51st Governor of New York; in New York City, United States (d. 2011)

== April 12, 1919 (Saturday) ==
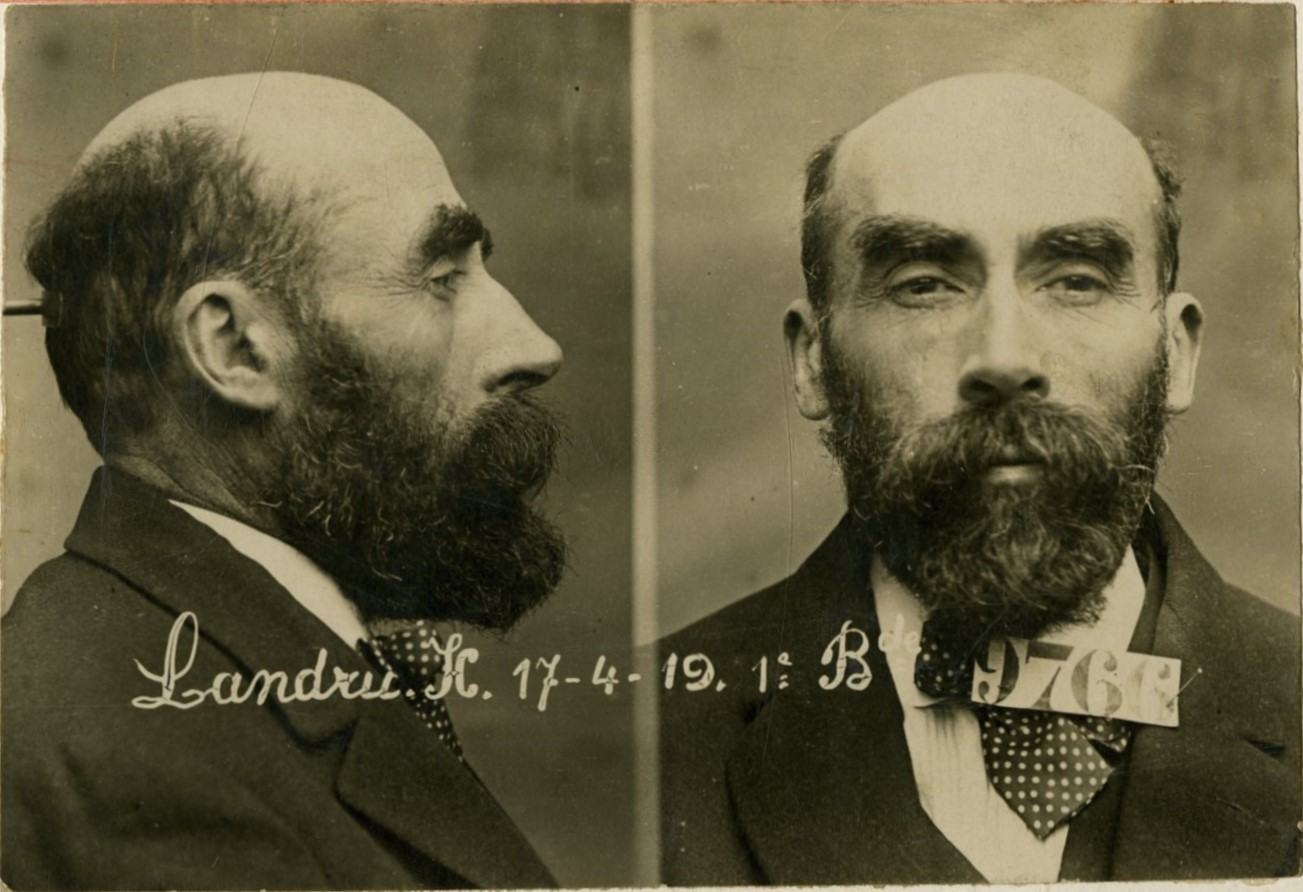
Arrest photo of Henri Désiré Landru, eventually found to be a serial killer.

- The Communist Party of Germany seized control of the Bavarian Soviet Republic and replaced Ernst Toller as its head of state with Eugen Leviné.
- Korean-American journalist Soh Jaipil convened the First Korean Congress in Philadelphia in reaction to the independence movement against Japanese rule that began last March in Seoul, with the intention to lobby the United States into recognizing Korean independence at the Paris Peace Conference.
- Amanullah Khan, Emir of Afghanistan, ordered a trial investigation into the assassination of his brother Habibullah Khan, which found his elder brother Nasrullah Khan complicit in the plot (although likely the evidence was fabricated). Nasrullah was imprisoned and executed one year later.
- French serial killer Henri Désiré Landru was arrested and charged with embezzlement after the sister of one of the victims tracked him down. Police suspected him of the disappearances of ten other people and by piecing together fragments of paperwork were able to charge him with eleven counts of murder.
- New light rail stations were added to the Muni Metro L Taraval line in San Francisco including 15th Avenue, 17th Avenue, 19th Avenue, 22nd Avenue, 23rd Avenue, 26th Avenue, 28th Avenue, 30th Avenue, 32nd Avenue, Ulloa and 15 Avenue, and Ulloa and Forest Side station.
- Born: István Anhalt, Hungarian-Canadian composer, known for compositions including the long-form works of La Tourangelle, Winthrop, and Alternative Voices, recipient of the Order of Canada; in Budapest, Hungarian Soviet Republic (present-day Hungary) (d. 2012)

== April 13, 1919 (Sunday) ==
- British and Gurkha troops under the command of Colonel Reginald Dyer massacred 379 Sikhs out a crowd of 10,000 to 20,000 gathered for an illegal public meeting at Jallianwala Bagh in Amritsar, Punjab, British India.
- A race riot broke out in Jenkins County, Georgia following a violent altercation between white law enforcers and attendees for a large gathering of 3,000 people at the all-black Carswell Grove Baptist Church. The initial violence ended in the deaths of two white officers and a black parishioner. Word of the lawmen's deaths result in white mobs lynching people associated with the United States that became known as the Red Summer.
- Battle for the Donbass – The Eighth Red Army attacked White forces in Kolpakovo district of Ukraine.
- Epitácio Pessoa of the Paraíba Republican Party received 71% of the vote in the Brazilian presidential election brought about by the death of Rodrigues Alves.
- An attempt to overthrow the government of the Bavarian Soviet Republic by German socialist leader Johannes Hoffmann ended in failure.
- A general strike was called by the Limerick Trades and Labour Council to protest against the declaration of a "Special Military Area" under the Defence of the Realm Act covering most of the city of Limerick and its surroundings in Ireland.
- American antiwar activist Eugene V. Debs entered prison at the Atlanta Federal Penitentiary in Atlanta, Georgia for speaking out against the draft during World War I.
- The Russian arts magazine Art of the Commune published its final issue.
- The Associazione Bancaria Italiana was established as a trade association of banks in Italy.
- The football club Figueres was established in Figueres, Catalonia, Spain.
- Born:
  - Howard Keel, American singer and actor, best known for his supporting role on the 1980s television drama Dallas; as Harold Clifford Keel, in Gillespie, Illinois, United States (d. 2004)
  - Joan Court, British activist, advocate for animal rights and child abuse prevention in the United Kingdom; in London, England (d. 2016)
  - Madalyn Murray O'Hair, American activist, promoter of atheism in the United States, founder of American Atheists; as Madalyn Mays, in Pittsburgh, United States (d. 1995, murdered)
- Died: Phoebe Hearst, 76, American philanthropist, founding member of the National Parent-Teacher Association, the National Cathedral School, University of California Museum of Anthropology, second Vice-Regent to the Mount Vernon Ladies' Association, wife to George Hearst and mother to William Randolph Hearst; died of influenza (b. 1842)

== April 14, 1919 (Monday) ==
- The All-Ukrainian Central Executive Committee ratified a military union with Soviet Russia, leading to the formation of the First, Second, Third Ukrainian Soviet Armies, and the Crimean Soviet Army the following day.
- The strike committee in Limerick proclaimed itself a soviet council, although it styled more along the lines of the strike organizers of the Dublin lock-out in 1913 than of any actual soviet government.
- The 31st Aero Squadron of the United States Army Air Service was disbanded at Mitchel Field, New York.
- The American Expeditionary Forces began shutting down military hospitals in Vichy, France, starting with Hospital No. 1 which had been serving up to 3,600 wounded American soldiers.
- The football club Cacereño was established in Cáceres, Spain.
- Born: Shamshad Begum, Indian singer, best known for her collaboration with film composers Naushad, S. D. Burman, and O. P. Nayyar; in Lahore, British India (present-day Pakistan) (d. 2013)
- Died:
  - Auguste-Réal Angers, 81, Canadian politician, 6th Lieutenant Governor of Quebec (b. 1819)
  - McCants Stewart, 41, American lawyer, first African American to practice law in Oregon; committed suicide (b. 1877)

== April 15, 1919 (Tuesday) ==
- U.S. President Woodrow Wilson issued a memorandum at the Paris Peace Conference proposing a line dividing the Istrian peninsula between Italy and Yugoslavia.
- Around 9,000 women telephone operators with the New England Telephone Company in Boston went on strike.
- The United States Navy selected the collier USS Jupiter to be converted into the navy's first aircraft carrier.
- British activist Eglantyne Jebb was arrested in London for distributing pamphlets in an effort to raise awareness and funding for the relief of German and Austrian children stricken by food shortages by the German blockade that was prolonged despite the signing of the 1918 armistice. Despite going to trial and being found guilty of unlawful protest, Jebb's impassioned speech during the trial so impressed the prosecuting counsel that he offered to pay her fine. It motivated Jebb and her sister Dorothy Buxton to establish the Save the Children fund the following May.
- New subway stations were added to the IRT Broadway Line in New York City, including Clark Street and Court Street.
- The Football Association of Yugoslavia was established in Zagreb.
- The novel The Moon and Sixpence by British writer W. Somerset Maugham was released by publisher Heinemann.
- Born:
  - Nelson Broms, American business executive, president of The Equitable Life Assurance Society of the United States; as Nelson Abramowitz, in New York City, United States (d. 2023)
  - Arjan Singh, Indian air force officer, Chief of the Air Staff from 1964 to 1969; in Lyallpur, British India (present-day Faisalabad, Pakistan) (d. 2017)
- Died: Jane Delano, 57, American nurse, founder of the American Red Cross Nursing Service (b. 1862)

== April 16, 1919 (Wednesday) ==
- A coup d'état backed by the Baltic German nobility overthrew the provisional national government in Liepāja, Latvia, forcing many members to take refuge aboard a steamship in the harbor.
- The Park Avenue Viaduct was completed and opened to traffic in Manhattan, New York City.
- Born:
  - Edward Simons Fulmer, American army air force officer, member of the 82nd Airborne Division and Operation Market Garden during World War II, recipient of the Distinguished Service Cross, Air Medal, and Military Order of William; in East Syracuse, New York, United States (d. 2017)
  - Merce Cunningham, American choreographer, developed modern dancing form for the works of John Cage and David Tudor; in Centralia, Washington, United States (d. 2009)
  - Pedro Ramírez Vázquez, Mexican architect, designed the Museo Nacional de Antropología and chief architect for International Olympic Committee; in Mexico City, Mexico (d. 2013)

== April 17, 1919 (Thursday) ==
- The third government of Finland under the Lauri Ingman administration dissolved, and replaced by the cabinet under Kaarlo Castrén.
- Women in New Brunswick were given the right to vote.
- The Alliance Seabird was entered for the Royal Aero Club competition for the Daily Mail £10,000 Atlantic Flight Prize. Ultimately it did not compete.
- Born:
  - Osvaldo Dorticós Torrado, Cuban state leader, 22nd President of Cuba; in Cienfuegos, Republic of Cuba (present-day Cuba) (d. 1983)
  - Frank Tallman, American stunt pilot; in East Orange, New Jersey, United States (d. 1978, killed in a plane crash)
  - Chavela Vargas, Costa-Rican born Mexican singer; as María Isabel Anita Carmen de Jesús Vargas Lizano, in San Joaquín de Flores, Costa Rica (d. 2012)

== April 18, 1919 (Friday) ==
- German socialist leader Johannes Hoffmann gathered 8,000 troops to fight a German Soviet force of 30,000 in Dachau, Germany, where he was defeated.
- Around 1,000 delegates from all over Ireland attended the Sinn Féin Ard-Fheis in Dublin where Éamon de Valera was elected president of the organization.
- The Compagnie des Messageries Aériennes (CMA) commenced a mail and freight service between Paris and Lille, using ex-military Bréguet aircraft.
- The Italian National Council of Fiume issued the Fiume krone as the official currency of the proposed Free State of Fiume in what is now Croatia.
- Born: Esther Afua Ocloo, Ghanaian businesswoman and financier, co-founder of Women's World Banking, pioneer of microlending; as Esther Afua Nkulenu, in Peki Dzake, British Togoland (present-day South Dayi District, Ghana) (d. 2002)

== April 19, 1919 (Saturday) ==
- Battle for the Donbass – The Ninth Red Army was forced to cease operations against the White forces in Kamianske, Ukraine.
- British High Commissioner Somerset Gough-Calthorpe abolished the provisional government in Kars, Turkey. Many of its leaders were arrested by British forces under command of William Montgomerie Thomson and exiled to Malta on June 2. The region was eventually put under control of Armenia and then Georgia in 1920.
- Automotive auto parts manufacturer Standard Motor Products was established in Long Island City, New York.
- American journalist John Reed published the first issue of the New York Communist as a mouthpiece for the Left Wing Section of the Socialist Party. Only ten issues were produced before it was absorbed by The Revolutionary Age newspaper.
- French composer André Messager premiered his romantic opera Monsieur Beaucaire at the New Prince's Theatre in London, as an adaptation of the novel by Booth Tarkington.
- Born:
  - Mason Andrews, American physician, delivered the first in vitro baby in the United States; in Norfolk, Virginia, United States (d. 2006)
  - William H. Poteat, American academic, promoter of philosophical anthropology and post-criticism; in Kaifeng, Republic of China (present-day China) (d. 2000)
  - Eric Lock, British air force officer, member of the No. 41 and No. 611 Squadrons during World War II, recipient of the Distinguished Service Order and Distinguished Flying Cross; in Bayston Hill, England (d. 1941, killed in a plane crash)

== April 20, 1919 (Sunday) ==
- The French Army blew up the bridge over the Dniester River at Bender, Moldova, to protect the city from the Bolsheviks.
- The Boston Telephone Strike ended with the strikers able to win higher wages.
- French cyclist Henri Pélissier won the 20th edition of the Paris–Roubaix cycling race, completing the 280 km route in 12 hours, 15 minutes.
- William Egan took over as leader of the crime gang Egan's Rats in St. Louis after his older brother Thomas Egan, died from Bright's disease.
- Football club UMS Batavia won the third Tiong Hoa Championship, defeating defending champions Union Semarang 2–1 in the first match and Tiong Hoa Soerabaja 2–0 in the second and final match at Batavia, Dutch East Indies (now Jakarta).
- Born: Richard Hillary, Australian air force officer, commander of the No. 603 Squadron during World War II, author of The Last Enemy; in Sydney, Australia (d. 1943, killed in a plane crash)
- Died: Richard W. Austin, 61, American politician, U.S. Representative of Tennessee from 1909 to 1919 (b. 1857)

== April 21, 1919 (Monday) ==
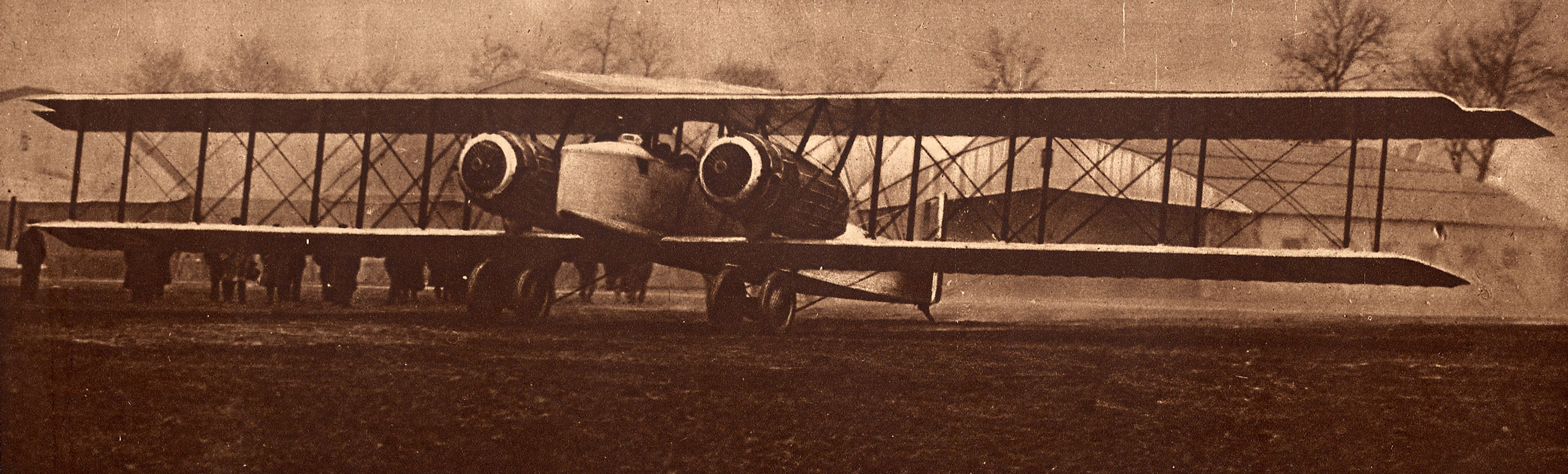
French aviator Jules Védrines in the Caudron aircraft just before takeoff on a flight to Rome that ended in a fatal crash en route.

- French aviator Jules Védrines was killed along with his mechanic when the Caudron aircraft he was attempting to fly from Vélizy-Villacoublay, France to Rome crashed near Saint-Rambert-d'Albon, France.
- The football club Rio Preto was established in São José do Rio Preto, Brazil.
- Born:
  - Licio Gelli, Italian financier, financial liaison between Nazi Germany and the Italian government, and his role in a scandal that dissolved Banco Ambrosiano in 1982; in Pistoia, Kingdom of Italy (present-day Italy) (d. 2015)
  - André Bettencourt, French politician, cabinet minister for the Pierre Messmer administration, recipient of the Legion of Honour and Croix de Guerre for serving the French Resistance during World War II; in Saint-Maurice-d'Ételan, France (d. 2007)

== April 22, 1919 (Tuesday) ==
- Russian Civil War – The Red Army prevented the Orenburg Independent Army under the White Russians from capturing Orenburg, Russia.
- The Royal Norwegian Navy Air Service established a naval air base at Kristiansand, Norway, which operated until 1940 when it was closed down during the German occupation of Norway.
- The sports club Älmhults was established in Älmhult, Sweden with programs in association football, bandy, hockey, skiing and track and field.
- Born:
  - Donald J. Cram, American chemist, recipient of the Nobel Prize in Chemistry for developing host–guest chemistry; in Chester, Vermont, United States (d. 2001)
  - Endre Bíró, Hungarian biochemist, leading researcher into muscle movement; in Budapest, Hungarian Soviet Republic (present-day Hungary) (d. 1988)

== April 23, 1919 (Wednesday) ==
- The Estonian Constituent Assembly convened its first parliament session in Tallinn, Estonia.
- The North Sea Aerial Navigation Company started a passenger service between Leeds and Hounslow Heath Aerodrome, England using ex-military Blackburn Kangaroo aircraft.
- Born: Oleg Penkovsky, Russian intelligence officer, officer with the GRU during the Cuban Missile Crisis and responsible for informing the United Kingdom of the missiles in Cuba; in Vladikavkaz, Mountainous Republic of the Northern Caucasus (present-day Russia) (d. 1963, executed)
- Died: Darius Cobb, 84, American painter, known for his religious and historic paintings including "Christ Before Pilate" and "Battle of Bunker Hill" (b. 1834)

== April 24, 1919 (Thursday) ==
- The 1st, 2nd, 3rd, 4th, and 7th Battalions of the Canadian Expeditionary Force were officially disbanded in Kingston, Ontario.
- The New Zealand Tunnelling Company was disbanded after the last members returned to New Zealand.
- Ford Brasil, a subsidiary of the Ford Motor Company, was founded.
- Survivors of the Armenian genocide attended the unveiling of a memorial at the Pangaltı Armenian Cemetery in Istanbul. Unfortunately, the monument was dismantled in 1922.
- The short-lived newspaper Latvian was published in Liepāja, Latvia as an organ for the Andrievs Niedra administration. It folded within a month when the government dissolved.
- The football club Chesterfield was re-formed in Chesterfield, England by a city council motion. The original club had formed in 1867.
- Born:
  - Glafcos Clerides, Cypriot state leader, 4th President of Cyprus; in Nicosia, British Cyprus (present-day Cyprus) (d. 2013)
  - David Blackwell, American mathematician, first African American to be inducted into the National Academy of Sciences; in Centralia, Illinois, United States (d. 2010)
- Died: Zhan Tianyou, 57, Chinese engineer, designer of the first Chinese-lead rail line from Beijing to Kalgan (b. 1861)

== April 25, 1919 (Friday) ==
- Russian Civil War – The Red Army crushed the Orenburg Independent Army, opening up opportunity to attack the Western Army of the White Russians from the rear.
- A workers uprising successfully deposed the military dictatorship in Baku, Azerbaijan.
- German architect Walter Gropius founded the Bauhaus school of architecture in Weimar, Germany.
- The 3rd Marine Expeditionary Brigade of the United States Marine Corps was disbanded in Galveston, Texas.
- French filmmaker Abel Gance released his war film J'accuse through Pathé Films. Gance filmed many scenes on actual battlefields during the closing months of the war, and recruited 2,000 French soldiers on leave to play the ghosts of the war dead in the film's climactic scene (Gance noted 80% of the soldiers filmed were killed in combat weeks later). The film became a major hit and was distributed by United Artists in 1921.
- Born: Finn Helgesen, Norwegian speed skater, gold medalist at the 1948 Winter Olympics; in Drammen, Norway (d. 2011)

== April 26, 1919 (Saturday) ==
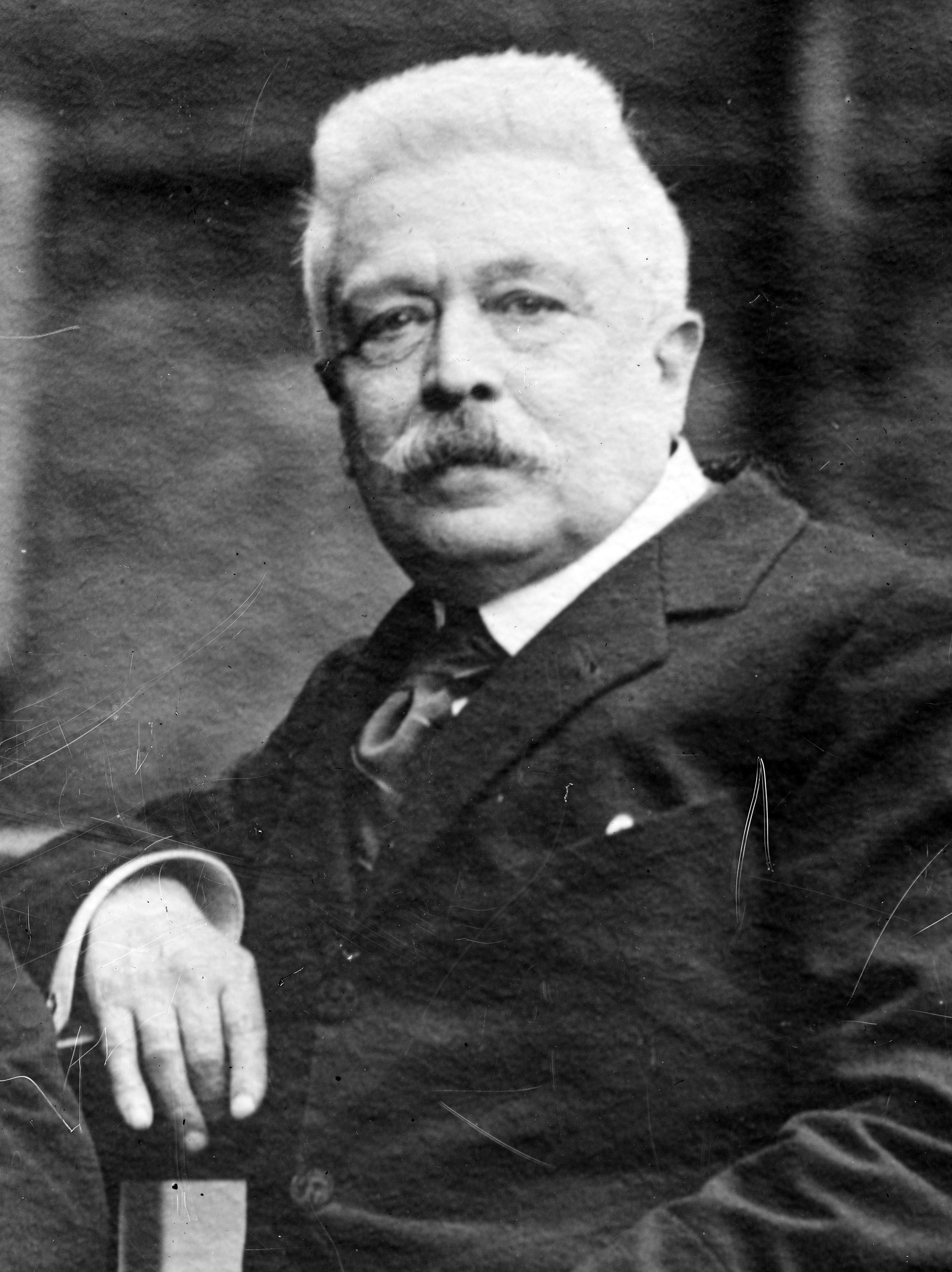
Vittorio Emanuele Orlando, Prime Minister of Italy

- Paris Peace Conference – Italian prime minister Vittorio Emanuele Orlando abandoned the peace conference and returned to Rome.
- Battle for the Donbass – White forces counterattacked and drove back the 8th Red Army advance in the Kolpakovo district of Ukraine.
- German socialist leader Johannes Hoffmann secured a force of 20,000 troops from the Freikorps and recaptured Dachau, Germany from the German Soviets. The Freikorps then surrounded Munich, causing Soviet authorities to panic and take ten hostages of German nobility to use as negotiation pieces.
- The First Congregational Church of Albany was dedicated in Albany, New York.
- The Ukrainian Republic Capella was established in Czechoslovakia to promote Ukrainian music and culture abroad.
- Football club Bethlehem Steel defeated Paterson 2–0 to win their fourth American Cup title in front of 3,000 spectators in Tacony, Pennsylvania.
- Born: Barrie Edgar, English television producer, known for long-running BBC shows Songs of Praise, Gardeners' World, and Come Dancing; as Anthony Barrie Edgar, in Birmingham, England (d. 2012)
- Died: Napoleon Cybulski, 64, Polish chemist, discoverer of adrenaline (b. 1854)

== April 27, 1919 (Sunday) ==
- The Limerick soviet committee called to end the general strike committee in Limerick after discussions with city mayor Phons O'Mara and the Bishop of Limerick.
- The Poltava Art Museum opened in Poltava, Ukraine, with the bulk of the collection donated by the estate of Russian painter Nikolai Yaroshenko.
- The Bohemia aircraft made its first test flight at Pilsen, Bohemia but its performance was lackluster and few sales were made.
- The Yōrō rail line was extended in the Gifu Prefecture, Japan with stations Tado, Ishizu, Mino-Yamazaki, Komano, Mino-Tsuya, and Ibi serving the line.
- The race car dramatic film The Roaring Road, starring Wallace Reid and co-directed by James Cruze and Frank Urson, was released through Famous Players–Lasky to become the fifth highest-grossing film of the year, and spawning the sequel Excuse My Dust the following year.
- Died: Anton Irv, 32, Estonian army officer, one of the organizers of the Estonian Land Forces; killed in action (b. 1886)

== April 28, 1919 (Monday) ==
- An earthquake in El Salvador measuring 5.9 in magnitude killed 100 people.
- Russian Civil War – The Red Army defeated White Russian forces near Buguruslan, Russia.
- The Avonmouth Docks railway station officially closed in Avonmouth, Bristol, England, although it had not been operating since 1915 when it closed as a war time measure.
- Born: Ike Altgens, American journalist, best known for his photographic work during the assassination of John F. Kennedy; as James William Altgens, in Dallas, United States (d. 1995)
- Died: Albert Estopinal, 74, American politician, U.S. Representative from Louisiana from 1908 to 1919 (b. 1845)

== April 29, 1919 (Tuesday) ==
Result of a clash between Austrian troops and Yugoslav fighters in Carinthia, on the border between Austria and Yugoslavia.

- Yugoslavia breached a ceasefire in Carinthia, Austria, but lost early territorial gains when Austrian forces began to counterattack days later.
- 1919 United States anarchist bombings: U.S. Senator Thomas W. Hardwick of Georgia received a bomb disguised as a mail package at his home. His housekeeper opened the package and ignited the bomb, blowing off her hands. His wife was also injured by the blast. Hardwick had been targeted by Italian anarchists led by Luigi Galleani for co-sponsoring the Immigration Act, which allowed the U.S. Government to target radicals.
- The Guards Division of the British Army was disbanded.
- The United States Army medical unit assigned to American Base Hospital No. 5 was formally dissolved, having served 45,837 patients during World War I.
- Born: Alla Rakha, Indian musician, tabla player known for his frequent collaborations with Ravi Shankar; as Allah Rakha Qureshi, in Jammu, British India (present-day India) (d. 2000)

== April 30, 1919 (Wednesday) ==
- With German forces close to capturing Munich, German Soviets executed 10 German nobles taken hostage three days earlier, including Prince Gustav of Thurn and Taxis.
- 1919 United States anarchist bombings: A U.S. Postal clerk connected the mail bomb sent to U.S. Senator Thomas W. Hardwick of Georgia with 16 similar packages, resulting in 12 mail bombs being recovered before they were sent to their intended targets, which included United States Attorney General A. Mitchell Palmer, United States Postmaster General Albert S. Burleson, Mississippi Governor Theodore G. Bilbo, Pennsylvania Governor William Cameron Sproul, J. P. Morgan Jr., John D. Rockefeller, Seattle Mayor Ole Hanson, New York City Mayor John Francis Hylan, Associate Justice of the Supreme Court of the United States Oliver Wendell Holmes Jr., and various other senators, Members of Congress, business leaders, federal judges and attorneys, and federal agents.
- The U.S. Navy battleship Tennessee was launched from the Brooklyn Navy Yard in New York City and would play an important role in the Pacific War during World War II.
- Civic elections were held in major cities of New Zealand, including Auckland and Wellington. James Gunson was re-elected by acclamation to remain Mayor of Auckland, while John Luke retained his seat as Mayor of Wellington with 42% of the vote.
- The 15th Guards Rifle Division of the Red Army was established.
- The 2nd Australian Light Horse Regiment was disbanded in Brisbane.
- The 19th Battalion of the Canadian Expeditionary Force was disbanded.
- The Australian Cycling Corps was disbanded.
- Danes Worldwide was established to provide career, education and network opportunity citizens of Denmark living and working abroad.
- The British Red Cross ceased operating a military hospital in Charlton House in Charlton, London, England after treating the last wounded veterans from World War I.
- The first prototype of the Avro Baby airplane was first flown.
- Died: John Pentland Mahaffy, 80, Irish academic, President of the Royal Irish Academy from 1911 to 1916 (b. 1839)
