= Fifteenth Avenue (disambiguation) =

Fifteenth Avenue is a road in New York. Fifteenth Avenue, 15th Avenue or 15 Av may also refer to:

- Fifteenth Avenue station, San Francisco, California
- Fifteenth Avenue station (Muni Metro), San Francisco, California
- Fifteenth Avenue Stadium, Rockford, Illinois
- Fifteenth Avenue Bridge, Pittsburgh, Pennsylvania
- Fifteenth Avenue Bridge (Seattle)
- 15 Av, the fifteenth day of Av, the fifth month of the Hebrew calendar
  - Tu B'Av a Jewish holiday observed on 15 Av
