= 1919 Tiong Hoa Championship =

The 1919 Tiong Hoa Championship season (known as the C.K.T.H Championship for organisation reasons) was the third season of the Dutch East Indies Tiong Hoa Championship football competition since its establishment in 1917. Union Semarang were the defending champions, having won their first league title.

It was contested by 3 teams, and U.M.S. Batavia won the championship.

All of the matches were played in Batavia.

== Semi-finals ==
Tiong Hoa Soerabaja received a bye from the semifinals.

19 April 1919

U.M.S.	2 – 1	Union Semarang
	Report

Batavia

== Final ==
20 April 1919

U.M.S.	2 – 0	Tiong Hoa Soerabaja
	Report

Batavia
