= Fifteenth Avenue Bridge =

Fifteenth Street Bridge
- Coordinates: 40°20′N 79°52′W
- Carries: 2 lanes of Fifteenth Street
- Crosses: Youghiogheny River
- Locale: McKeesport, Pennsylvania and Port Vue, Pennsylvania

Characteristics
- Design: Girder bridge
- Total length: 1253 ft
- Width: 36 ft

History
- Opened: 1995

Location
- Interactive map of Fifteenth Street Bridge

The Fifteenth Street Bridge is a girder bridge across the Youghiogheny River connecting the Pittsburgh, Pennsylvania, industrial suburbs of Port Vue and McKeesport, Pennsylvania. The 1995 structure replaced a 1906 truss bridge. The bridge's length is significantly longer than that of several surrounding structures because its crosses both the river and a large water treatment facility.

The Youghiogheny River Trail, a portion of the Cumberland, Maryland-to-Pittsburgh Great Allegheny Passage uses the bridge's pedestrian lanes. Through McKeesport, the trail features a designated right of way, while it is officially signed through city streets in Port Vue.

As of 2005, the bridge officially became known as the Senator Albert V. “Bud” Belan Bridge after Governor Ed Rendell signed Senate Bill 406. The renaming was in honor of Sen. Belan’s efforts to restore the bridge.
