= Haugesund Naval Air Station =

- IATA: none; ICAO: none

Summary
- Airport type: Military
- Operator: Royal Norwegian Navy Air Service
- Serves: Haugesund, Norway
- Location: Avaldsnes, Karmøy Municipality
- Elevation AMSL: 0 m / 0 ft
- Coordinates: 59.3566°N 005.2817°E

Map

Runways
Direction	Length		Surface
Direction	m	ft	Surface
			Water

Haugesund Naval Air Station (Norwegian: Marinens flystasjon Haugesund) was a military water aerodrome situated at Avaldsnes, just outside the town of Haugesund in Rogaland county, Norway. At the time it was in operation, it was located in the Avaldsnes Municipality on the island of Karmøy (now part of Karmøy Municipality). The air base was operated by the Royal Norwegian Navy Air Service from 17 November 1918 to 7 April 1919. The Naval air station consisted of three portable hangars, a barracks and an outhouse.

The station was established to allow two Sopwith Babies to assist the Royal Norwegian Navy in minesweeping around Karmøy. In this capacity they continued until 21 January 1919. The airport was subsequently reactivated on 5 February to aid in fisheries patrol. This duty lasted until 7 April.

== History ==
The need for an airport in Haugaland for the Naval Air Service arose in 1918, during the late stages of the First World War. The Entente Powers had mined the waters of the North Sea between the borders of the Norwegian territorial waters to Scotland in an effort to deter German U-boats. The navy decided to establish the station in the bay at Avaldsnes. The airport's structures were built Norsk Barakke- og Imprigneringskompani and sent by railway from Hamar to Bergen and onwards to Karmøy by barge, arriving on 27 October 1918.

The crew was sent from Karljohansvern on 15 November 1918 and the command flag was hoisted on 17 November. The same day Hjalmar Riiser-Larsen flew the first of two Sopwith Babies to the station. Seven people were stationed at Avaldsnes, under the command of First Lieutenant Riiser-Larsen. He was subordinate to the captain of HNoMS Tordenskjold, which was stationed in Haugesund. The Spowiths were used in minesweeping duty. They would survey the North Sea for mines. In case they found any, they would note its location on a map and drop it to the crew on the nearest minesweeper. Work was carried out around Karmøy and the shipping channel towards Stavanger. By January it was decided that minesweeping in the area would no longer require aerial aid. The aircraft were flown to Kristiansand on 17 January 1919 and the station was closed on 21 January 1919.

After a request from the fisheries organizations, the Navy Air Services agreed to assist in the search for herring. The station was reactivated on 5 February 1919 and two days later the two Sopwiths were attempted returned to Avaldsnes. However, both had motor issues during flight. Not until 13 February did the aircraft reach their destination. Fisheries patrol continued until 7 April. There were plans to return the following year, but this was not carried through. Instead the buildings were attempted sold to Bø Teglverk. When they were not able to pay, they were instead moved to Flatøy in 1922.

== Facilities ==
The airport was situated at Avaldsnes in Karmøy, in the outskirts of Haugesund. It was situated on the property of Bø Teglværk. The aerodrome consisted of three portable hangars, measuring 7.5 by 8.5 meters (25 by 28 ft) and 3.5 meters (11 ft) tall. It also featured a barracks and an outhouse.
