= Bohemia B.5 =

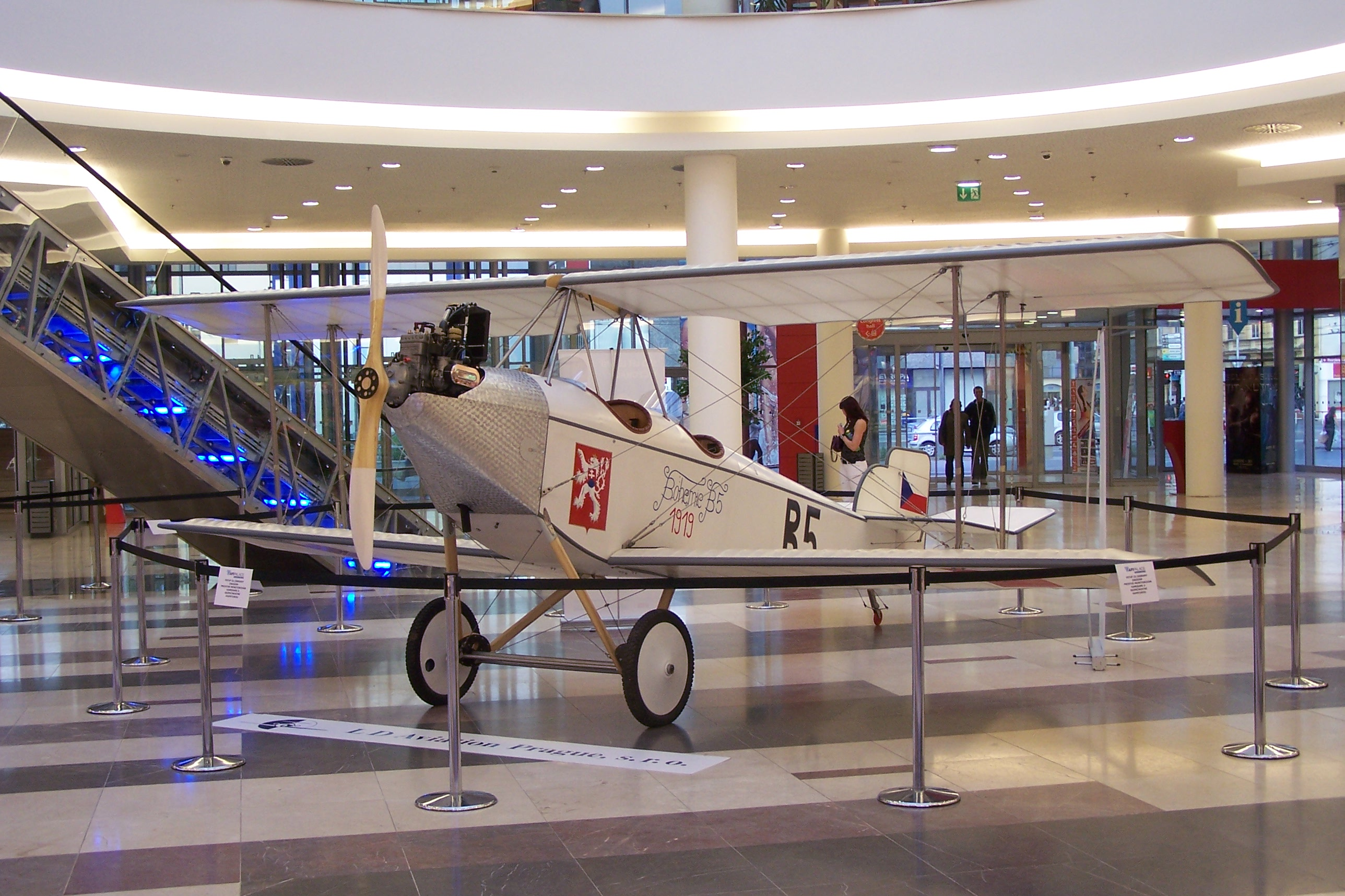

General information
- Type: Sport Trainer
- National origin: Czechoslovakia
- Manufacturer: Bohemia Aircraft
- Number built: 1 known

History
- First flight: 27 April 1919

The Bohemia B.5 was a single engined, two seat, light sport aircraft designed and built in Czechoslovakia shortly after World War I.

== Design and development ==
The B.5 was the first aircraft designed and built in Czechoslovakia at the end of the First World War. Designed and constructed at the Bohemia Aircraft works the B.5 had one engine and two seats in separate, tandem open cockpits.

The B.5 was a typical biplane sport/trainer aircraft of the period, with staggered upper and lower wings; the lower wing attaching directly to the lower fuselage between the two cockpits and the one piece upper wing supported on cabane and inter-plane struts.

The structure of the fuselage and wings was entirely conventional with fabric and/or plywood skinning and wooden structure. Conventional fin and tailplane were sited at the rear of the fuselage and were fitted with fin and elevators of generous area for yaw and pitch control. Roll control was effected by ailerons fitted to the upper wings only. The undercarriage consisted of bungee sprung main-wheels on a live axle supported by wire-braced struts and a sprung tail-skid at the extreme end of the fuselage.

Power was supplied by a Neue Automobil-Gesellschaft mbH NAG 4-cyl in-line piston engine, rated at 40 hp (30 kW), turning a two-blade wooden propeller counter-clockwise as viewed from the cockpit.

Colours and markings were simple with the fabric covering being left in its natural colour doped with a clear varnish. Large black letters across the span of the lower wing bottom surface spelt out BOHEMIA.

== Operational history ==
The prototype first flew from Plzeň aerodrome on 27 April 1919, but due to its lacklustre performance it was not a commercial success with few sales. The prototype B.5 crashed on Saturday, 17 May 1919, killing the student, Joseph Klíbr, and slightly injuring the instructor in the rear cockpit, Rudolf Polanecký. The remains of the B.5 were swiftly resurrected in just six weeks.

The B.5 kept flying until 1923 when it was owned by Chrudim J. Wiesner. By this time the NAG engine was completely worn out and unsafe. Wiesner and a test pilot from the Aero factory, Rudolf Valenta, converted the B.5 to a glider by removing the engine, modifying the front fuselage and replacing the wheeled undercarriage with skids. Results of attempts to fly the glider by Valenta Kbelská were mediocre due to the poor aerodynamic qualities and lack of a suitable launching area.

No complete B.5 exists today, but the fuselage is on display at the Kbely Aviation Museum in Prague-Kbely.

== Specifications (Bohemia B.5) ==
Data from

General characteristics

- Crew: One
- Capacity: One
- Length: 6.68 m (21 ft 11 in)
- Wingspan: 8.00 m (26 ft 3 in)
- Height: 2.8 m (9 ft 3 in)
- Wing area: 18.05 m^{2} (194.3 sq ft)
- Empty weight: 340 kg (750 lb)
- Gross weight: 520 kg (1,147 lb)
- Powerplant: 1 × Neue Automobil-Gesellschaft mbH NAG 4-cyl in-line , 30 kW (40 hp)

Performance

- Maximum speed: 110 km/h (68 mph, 59 kn)
- Range: 120 km (74 mi, 64 nmi)
- Endurance: ca 3 hours
- Service ceiling: 1,500 m (4,921 ft)

== See also ==
Aircraft of comparable role, configuration, and era

- Haller Ha 6
