= Shu'lai Inqilob =

Tajik Persian weekly newspaper

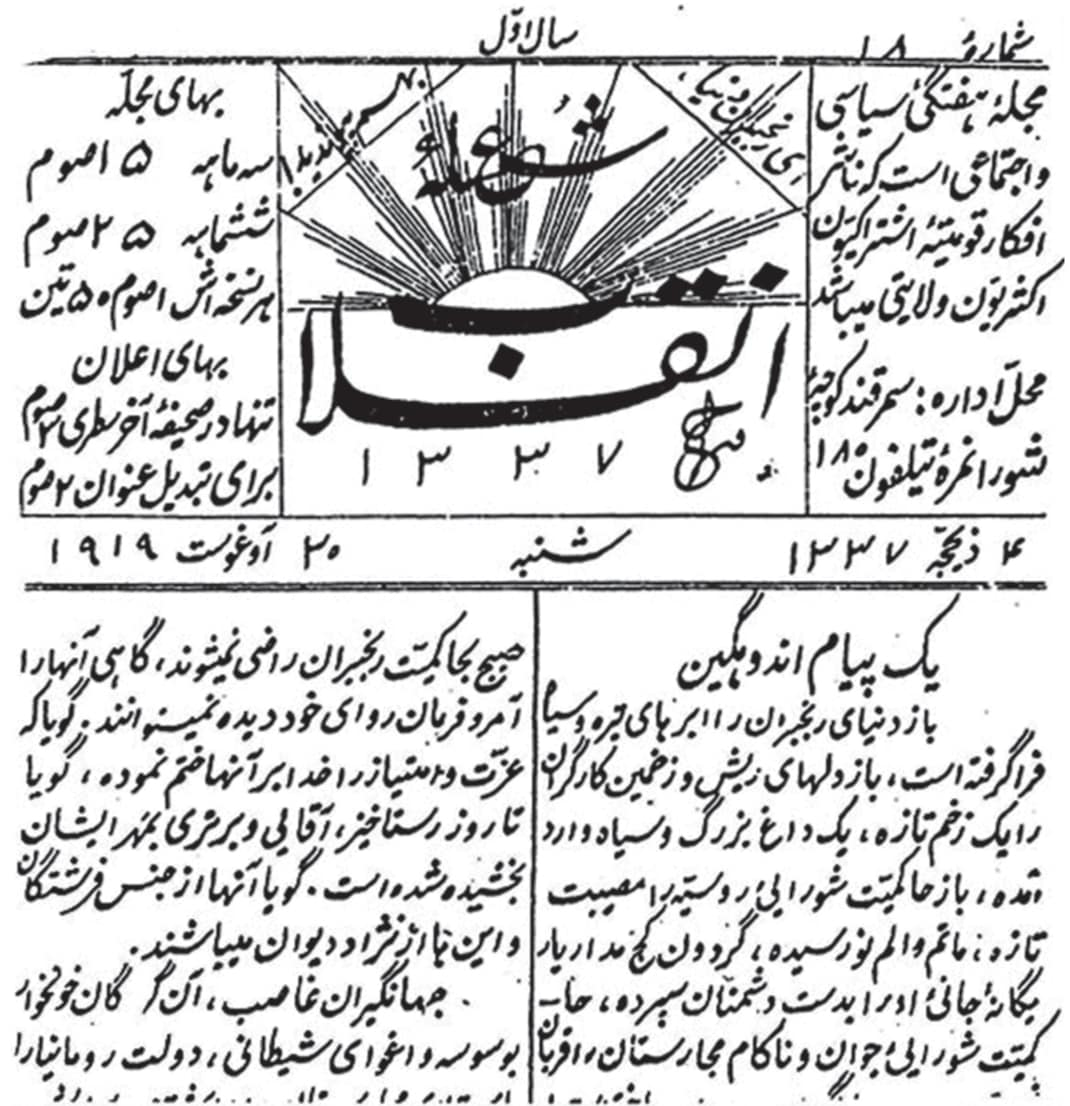
- A page of the Shu'lai Inqilob, dated 20 August 1919
- Type: Weekly
- Founder: Sayyid Rizo Alizoda
- Founded: 10 April 1919
- Ceased publication: December 1921
- Political alignment: Communist
- Language: Persian
- City: Samarkand
- Country: Russian Soviet Republic

Shu'lai Inqilob (Persian: شعله انقلاب, "Flame of the Revolution") was a Persian weekly newspaper published from Samarkand, Turkestan Autonomous Soviet Republic between April 1919 and December 1921.

== Background ==
For centuries, Persian had functioned as the dominant language in the multilingual environment of Central Asia, dominating fields such as religion, science, literature, administration, correspondence, and commerce. After Central Asia came under Soviet rule, the use of Persian became limited to being the first language of specific groups. The name "Tajik" was used by others (at least in the cities) to refer to the non-nomadic population that spoke Persian as their first language and lived around the Zarafshan, Amu Darya and Syr Darya rivers, as well as the Pamir Mountains. In the cities, many inhabitants were bilingual or had switched to Persian from other languages, but they usually identified themselves by their city, such as Bukhara, Samarkand, or Khujand. The Persian speakers of Central Asia considered their language to be a branch of forsi ("Persian"), and it was not until 1924 that it was recognized as a separate and formalized language named Tajik. Central Asian Jews, Ironis, some Arabs, Afghans, and exiled Iranians also spoke Persian as their first language.

When the constitution of the Turkestan Autonomous Soviet Socialist Republic (Turkestan ASSR) was established in 1920, the Tajiks were not recognized as one of its indigenous peoples, but the Kyrgyz, Uzbek and Turkmen were. The benefits granted to the "Persian" (Ironi) community, a Persian-speaking Shia group whose existence is recognized in the constitution, may have been intended by the Turkestan administration to protect the cultural interests of the Tajiks.

In the Turkestan ASSR, pan-Turkic nationalism was the dominant idea of ethnic politics. The exclusion of the Tajiks was driven not only by state intent but also possibly by their refusal to identify with the Ironi community. This group was mostly descended from settlers who had left Merv after its destruction by the Emirate of Bukhara in 1785. Up until the start of the 20th century, the Ironi was also joined by later migrants from Iran and Central Asia. Because of their Shia faith, the Ironi were regarded as "heretics", and, combined with their immigrant background, this placed them at the lowest level of society.

== History ==
=== First version ===
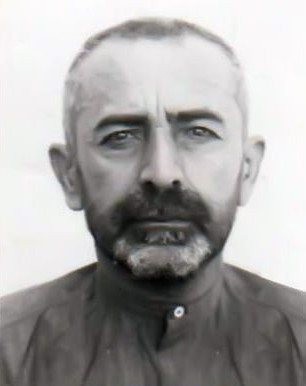
Sayyid Rizo Alizoda, the founder of the Shu'lai Inqilob

On 10 April 1919, the first Persian-language newspaper in the Turkestan ASSR, Shu'lai Inqilob ("Flame of the Revolution"), was published by Sayyid Rizo Alizoda (1887–1938), an Ironi from the Ironi district of Bogh-e Shemol in Samarkand. The newspaper was published weekly in Samarkand, broadcasting the ideological line of the Communist Party of Turkestan. Alizoda composed the majority of the articles under different names because the newspaper had only a few authors. On 15 May 1919, Shu'lai Inqilob wrote a statement due to the Communist Party center in Tashkent ordered the establishment of a "Persian Section" of the party:

"The Persian section [shu’beh ye fars], i.e. Ironi, Afghon, Tojik, which has been opened in our centre Tashkent in the Commissariat for National Affairs, has just sent a telegram to the Samarkand Commissariat and proposed the opening of such a section in our government office. Moreover, it recommends the opening of schools, clubs, reading rooms as well as the printing and publishing of literature for the "Fors" and in the Forsi language. In the name of all our Forsi-speaking brothers we express our gratitude from the bottom of our hearts."

Several Persian-speaking communities remained overlooked in this statement, among them the Central Jews (including the Bukharan Jews), the Pamir people and some Arabs. It is uncertain whether Alizoda wanted this "Persian nation" to also include the tojik-chighatoy, a Persian-speaking Turkic people, who called themselves "Tajik" despite identifiying with several Turkic tribes. The political climate of the period was reflected in the Ironi being mentioned first. The majority of Samarkand's Ironi had consistently supported the objectives and nationality policies of the Communists more than the other Persian-speaking communities in Central Asia.

In July 1919, Alizoda introduced the term zaboni modari ("mother tongue") when referring to the Persian language, describing it as the "great pillar of the nation." However, he struggled to clearly define a nation based on Persian. In his writings, he used terms such as millati fors ("Persian nation"), millathoi fors ("Persian nations"), forsiyon ("Persian speakers"), and forsho ("Persians") interchangeably, despite their different meanings. This reflected how challenging it was for him to define a country based on the Persian language. In this period, the term "mother tongue" referred to the language that a person commonly spoke and understood best, often the language used at home or in everyday life.

Alizoda became the leader of the Persian Section when it was established in July 1919. The Persian section, including the several Ironi institutions that it established in Samarkand, were unsuccessful. The Anjoman e muovenat e ironion ("Society for Assistance to Iranians") and the Anjoman e donesh e Forsiyon ("Society for the Persians' Knowledge") were amongst them. On August 20, 1919, Alizoda complained in Shu'lai Inqilob that his attempts to create a linguistically based "Persian nation" had failed. In October 1819, the Samarkand Party Committee could no longer fund Shu'lai Inqilob, leading to its closure.

=== Second version ===
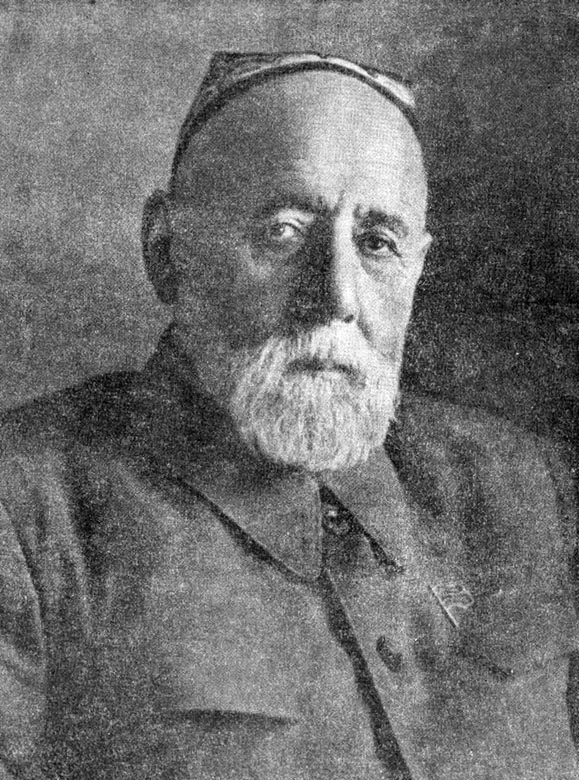
Sadriddin Ayni, one of the writers for the Shu'lai Inqilob newspaper, who would later play a key-role in the establishment of a Tajik linguistic identity.

However, in November 1919 it was re-launched, by the Tashkent-based Turkkommissiya as part of their effort to recruit more members into the Communist party. During this period the newspaper was joined by Sadriddin Ayni and Hoji Muin, both prominent writers who would later play a key-role in the establishment of a Tajik linguistic identity. Their work was backed by the Turkommissiya, which promoted bilingualism to counter what it thought were pan-Turkic tendencies in the local Communist party's effort to win over the bourgeoisie.

Nonetheless, the authors of Shu'lai Inqilob did not only write in Persian. For the bilingual publication Kutulush ("Liberation"), Ayni published articles in both Persian and Turkic. In contrast to Alizoda, both Muin and Ayni avoided making reference to any hypothetical "Persian nation" and frequently referred to themselves and their readers as mo Turkestanion ("we Turkestanis"), even though the Shu'lai Inqilob still described its language as Persian. The concept of the "nation of Turkestan", which was mostly regionally focused rather than linguistic and ethnic, was appealing to many Persian-speakers. All phrasing that might suggest a claim to a "Persian nation" was dropped in an effort to attract as many Persian-speaking readers as possible.

The popularity of the newspaper only slightly grew in spite of this new effort. In contrast to the single Persian-language daily, Shu'lai Inqilob, there were many Turkic-language newspapers at the time. Ayni expressed dissatisfaction with the newspaper's lack of interest, negatively comparing it to the newspaper engagement of the Uzbeks. The Shu'lai Inqilob was closed down in December 1921, after its ninetieth issue.

== Aftermath ==
Not until August 1924 did a new Persian newspaper appear (Awaz-e Tajik-e Kambaghal), with Alizoda, Mu'in and Ayni in its editorial team. It was through this newspaper that the Persian language was for the first time referred to as "Tajik".

Tajikistan was first created in 1924 as the Tajik Autonomous Soviet Socialist Republic (Tajik ASSR). A specific Persian dialect, with vocabulary and pronunciation different from formal written Persian, was deliberately made the national language of Tajikistan by the Soviets and renamed "Tajiki" to forcibly separate it from the common variant of Persian spoken from Istanbul to Calcutta. The Tajiks were also excluded from the enormous global world of Persian literature, both past and current, by the creation of a new phonetic alphabet, first Latin-based in 1928 and later Cyrillic in 1940. With Persian confined to Tajikistan and replaced by Russian as Central Asia's common language, the unity of the Persianate world was broken, steering Soviet and post-Soviet Central Asia onto a path distinct from Iran and Afghanistan.

== Reasons behind its failure ==
According to the British historian Paul Bergne, the disinterest of the Samarkandi Tajik population towards the main newspaper in their language "most likely seems to be that the local Sunni Tajiks simply did not wish to follow the lead given by a despised group of Shi'i Ironi immigrants." He added that "the failure of the policy of bi-lingualism was also due to the lack of solidarity amongst Persian speakers (Sunni Tajiks feeling antagonistic to Shi'i Ironis and Bukharan Jews) and the indifference of the Tajik community to the fact that the new message of Marxism was being propagated in their own language."

The German historian Lutz Rzehak suggests that "the Tajiks did not yet see language as an important part of their identity and were content to regard themselves as 'Turkestanis' even if that meant preferring the Turki language which most of their literate members understood as well as Persian." In the Turkestan ASSR, the Persian speakers found Turkestani nationalism just as interesting as the Turkic speakers. Even the lyrics to a patriotic "Turan March" were written by Ayni.

== Sources ==
- Adel, Gholamali Haddad; Elmi, Mohammad Jafar; Taromi-Rad, Hassan (2012). Periodicals of the Muslim World: An Entry from Encyclopaedia of the World of Islam. EWI Press Ltd. ISBN 978-1908433107.
- Arjomand, Saïd Amir (2025). Persianate Historical Sociology: Collected Essays. Brill. ISBN 978-9004742529.
- Bergne, Paul (2007). The Birth of Tajikistan: National Identity and the Origins of the Republic. Bloomsbury Publishing. ISBN 978-1845112837.
- Heathershaw, John; Herzig, Edmund (2013). "From Resettlement to Conflict: Development-Induced Involuntary Displacement and Violence in Tajikistan". In Heathershaw, John; Herzig, Edmund (eds.). The Transformation of Tajikistan: The Sources of Statehood. New York, NY: Routledge. p. 1991. ISBN 978-1138209749.
- Foltz, Richard (2019). A History of the Tajiks: Iranians of the East. New York: Bloomsbury Publishing. ISBN 978-1784539559.
- Rzehak, Lutz (2023). "How Tajik was made into a national language". In Ido, Shinji; Mahmoodi-Bakhtiari, Behrooz (eds.). Tajik Linguistics. De Gruyter. pp. 1–44. ISBN 978-3110619409.
