= Latvijas Avīze (1919) =

Latvian newspaper

- Type: Daily
- Editor: V. Zariņš, E. Kadeģis
- Founded: April 24, 1919
- Ceased publication: mid-1919
- Political alignment: pro-Niedra
- Language: Latvian language
- Headquarters: Liepāja

Latvijas Avīze ('Latvian Newspaper') was a daily newspaper published from Liepāja, Latvia in 1919. It was set up by followers of Andrievs Niedra following the 16 April 1919 putsch. The first issue came out on 24 April 1919. The newspaper was edited by V. Zariņš and E. Kadeģis.

The newspaper became short-lived, as the Niedra cabinet fell in late June 1919.
