= Ulloa and 14th Avenue station =

Light rail stop in San Francisco, California, US

Ulloa and 14th Avenue
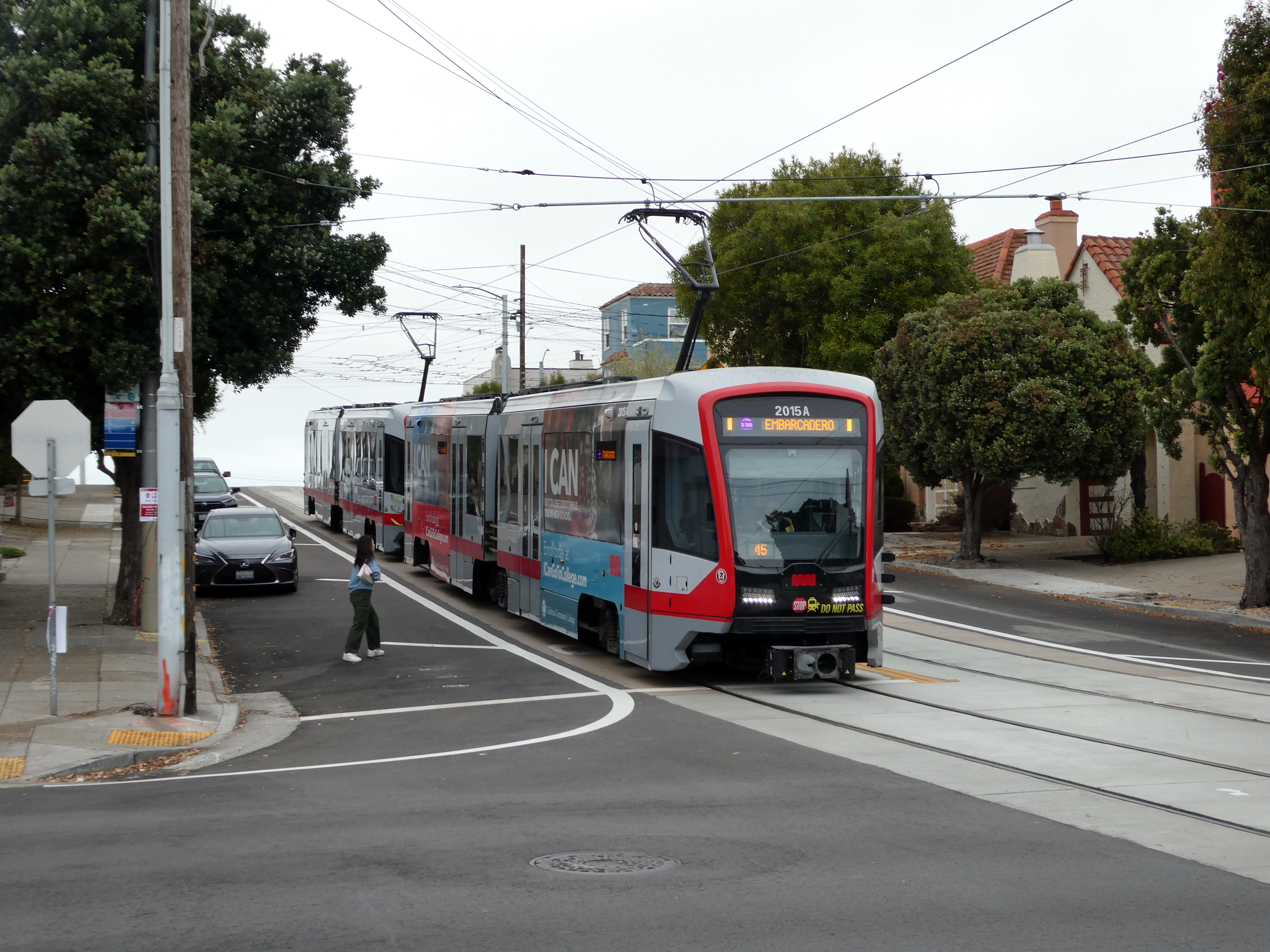
- An inbound train at Ulloa and 14th Avenue in 2024

General information
- Location: Ulloa Street at 14th Avenue; San Francisco, California
- Coordinates: 37.741543°N 122.470138°W
- Platforms: None, passengers wait on sidewalk
- Tracks: 2
- Connections: Muni: 48

Construction
- Accessible: No

History
- Opened: September 28, 2024

Services
Preceding station	Muni	Following station
15th Avenue and Taraval toward SF Zoo	L Taraval	West Portal toward Embarcadero
Taraval and 17th Avenue One-way operation	L Taraval	West Portal toward Embarcadero
Location

Ulloa and 14th Avenue station is a light rail stop on the Muni Metro L Taraval line, located at the intersection of Ulloa Street and 14th Avenue in the West Portal neighborhood of San Francisco, California. The stop opened on September 28, 2024, replacing the former stops at 15th Avenue and at Forest Side Avenue. The stop does not have platforms; passengers must wait on the sidewalk on the near side of the intersection.

== History ==
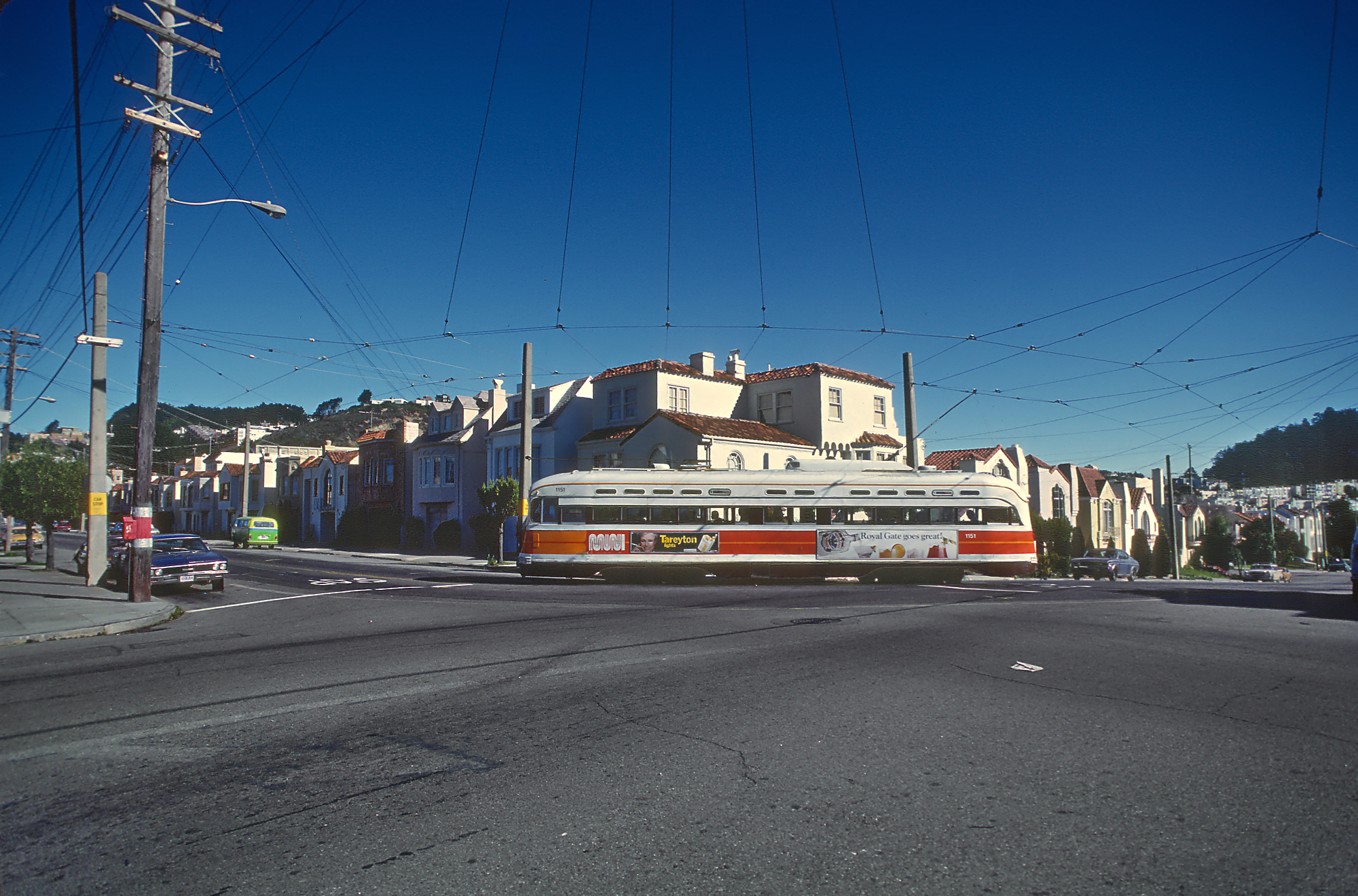
A streetcar at Ulloa and 15th Avenue in 1980

Muni's L Taraval line opened as a shuttle between West Portal and 33rd Avenue on April 12, 1919. From West Portal station, the line runs west on Ulloa Street for 1,600 feet (490 m), then jogs north on 15th Avenue to Taraval Street. By the early 21st century, L Taraval trains stopped on Ulloa Street at Forest Side Avenue, and on 15th Avenue just north of Ulloa Street. Neither stop had platforms; passengers crossed parking or travel lane to board trains.

In March 2014, Muni released details of the proposed implementation of their Transit Effectiveness Project (later rebranded MuniForward), which included a variety of stop changes for the L Taraval line. The Ulloa and 15th stop was one of several stops that would be eliminated to increase stop spacing and reduce travel time. On September 20, 2016, the SFMTA Board approved the L Taraval Rapid Project. Early implementation of many changes, including elimination of Ulloa and 15th Avenue and several other stops, occurred on February 25, 2017.

In January 2018, amid controversy over the potential removal of Taraval and 17th Avenue station, Muni released a revised proposal under which Ulloa and Forest Side would be moved one block west to Ulloa and 14th Avenue to compensate for the removal of the inbound stop at 15th Avenue and Taraval station. The SFMTA Board approved the plan in July 2018. On March 30, 2020, all Muni Metro service was replaced with buses due to the COVID-19 pandemic. Muni Metro rail service returned on August 22, 2020, but was replaced again by buses on August 25. This was the last use of the stop at Ulloa and Forest Side.

Construction on Segment B of the project, between West Portal and Sunset Boulevard, began in January 2022 and was completed in mid-2024. L Taraval rail service resumed on September 28, 2024, with the Ulloa and 14th Avenue stop opened.
