= Joan Court =

English health worker and activist

- Court in 2012
- Born: 13 April 1919; Knightsbridge Square, London, England
- Died: 1 December 2016 (aged 97); Cambridge, England
- Notable work: In the Shadow of Mahatma Gandhi (2002); The Bunny Hugging Terrorist (2009); Animals Betrayed (2012)

Joan Court (13 April 1919 – 1 December 2016) was a British midwife and social worker who set up the Battered Child Research Department at the NSPCC. She was also a prominent figure in the animal rights movement.

== Early life 1919–1934 ==
The second of two children, Joan Court was born on 13 April 1919 in Knightsbridge Square, London, England, where her father Cecil was a solicitor with the family firm. Joan's mother Muriel was the daughter of the mayor of St Albans, Henry Gibson. Joan's parents separated in 1922 when she was three years old, Muriel taking the two children to live at Parsonage Farm, Rickmansworth, where her parents lived. After a year at Parsonage Farm, Muriel moved to Baker Street, London and Peter was sent to boarding school. Muriel succumbed to alcoholism and Joan retreated from her mother's rages and found solace in her pet cats.

In 1926 the family moved to 7 Stanley Villas in Marsh Lane, Pinner, not far from the railway station. In 1930 Cecil Court intervened and took Joan to a convent in Torquay. In the holidays Joan would return to Pinner. In the hot summer of 1932 Cecil Court committed suicide. Joan and her mother then entered domestic service in Cornwall to make ends meet, while Peter left for India to work for the Ceylon Tea Company.

McKenna was a lifelong vegetarian.

== Cape Town 1934–1936 ==
In 1934 the Society for Overseas Settlement of British Women offered Joan and her mother the opportunity to live in Cape Town, working in domestic service in a convent. During this time Joan took inspiration from Indian poets such as Rabindranath Tagore. She determined to become a writer and took up life modelling to pay for a typewriter. By 1936 the Mother Superior suggested to Joan that she become a nurse at St Thomas' in London, which she did, leaving her mother and girlfriend Jane behind in Cape Town.

== Nursing and midwifery 1936–1945 ==
Joan returned to Parsonage Farm before taking up a position at St Monica's Home of Rest in Bristol, in order to prepare for the Entrance Examination of the General Nursing Council. After two years she passed the examination and entered St Thomas' Hospital as a trainee nurse. During the course of her time there she met the soul mate of her youth, Liz, and served as a nurse when WW2 broke out. Unfortunately Liz developed multiple sclerosis and died in May 1943. In January 1943 Joan had begun to train as a midwife at Willesden.

== India 1945–1948 ==
On 14 October 1945 Joan sailed on the SS Strathnaver for India to work as a midwife in Calcutta for the Quakers. Her brother Peter met her when she arrived in Bombay and the next day she was on board the Calcutta Express train. Soon after arriving she was dispatched to areas of Bengal affected by a tidal wave and flooding. She met several of her heroes in India - in Bengal she nursed the daughter of Rabindranath Tagore and met Gandhi; and in Calcutta she heard E. M. Forster give a lecture on English Literature. At this time Joan also visited a number of Hindu and Buddhist sacred sites including the cave paintings in Ajunta.

Once the crisis in Bengal was over Joan moved to the Midwifery and Child Welfare Centre on Sitaram Ghosh street in Calcutta. In this service she met one of her dearest life-long friends, fellow nurse Bela Bannerjee. Supported by the Quakers with medicine and vitamin supplies, Joan did what she could to help alleviate the problems of terrible poverty in Calcutta. When the Calcutta riots broke out on 16 August 1946 the streets became dangerous so requests for a midwife would pass to Joan by word of mouth over the rooftops.

After a year the riots subsided but the trouble had spread to East Bengal. Joan went to help Gandhi who was fasting and walking from village to village to help restore peace. She would accompany him on walks, Joan walking in a ditch so he could rest his hand on her shoulder. On one occasion she led a gathering of villagers in singing Gandhi's favourite hymn, "When I Survey the Wondrous Cross".

Joan met her first male lover Harry in India. Harry was an American working for another relief agency and although he was married they carried on a romantic love affair. At this time Joan was planning to study public health nursing in England but when she saw an advert for the Frontier Nursing Service in Kentucky (a horseback nursing service for rural communities), she jumped at the chance. The service was happy to take her after completing her health visitor course so on 15 August 1947, Indian Independence Day, she returned to England.

== Chelsea, London 1948–1949 ==
Living in Chelsea while training as a health visitor, Joan completed the course in 1948, the year when the National Health Service came into being. After a year of service Joan continued with her plan to work in Kentucky as a rural health visitor. She left London in 1949, meeting with Harry in New York for a week before going on to Kentucky to take up her position.

== Kentucky, USA 1949–1950 ==
Joan completed six weeks of training in Wendover and Hyden in Kentucky before being allocated to the outpost of Flat Creek by the Red Bird River. The Nursing Service centre covered many families in a five-mile radius. There were two horses allocated to the centre, and Joan's horse Doc became a close companion on her many journeys. Joan's mother died while a severe winter took hold of Kentucky. By the following summer Joan was looking for work in a developing nation again and found a post with the World Health Organization, the team led by Jean Orkney, whose work had inspired Joan many years ago. At the same time Joan's relationship with Harry had ended when his wife found out about their affair.

== Pakistan 1951–1955 ==
Joan arrived in Lahore, Pakistan in May 1951 to work with Jean Orkney training community health workers. Lahore was a city Joan had always wanted to visit - said to have been founded by Alexander the Great, one of her heroes, and home to Kipling's Kim, her role model. In 1951 there was a lot of political unrest following the partition of India and Joan dealt mainly with refugees. As part of this team Joan introduced family planning as part of their initiative. During this period she met and fell in love with a local programme director who she named only as Hussein.

After the two-year contract in Lahore finished, Joan spent a month in England before returning to Pakistan, this time based in Karachi. Hoping to be reunited with Hussein she found that he had in fact agreed to an arranged marriage in her absence. Her family planning initiative earned Joan a rebuke from the Ministry of Health, who said they needed young men for the army. Considering the issues, Joan began to feel that social work would be a more appropriate career for her than nursing. She returned to London in May 1955, taking with her her beloved Siamese cat Simon.

== London and Smith College, Massachusetts 1957–1967 ==
After two years of a social work course, Joan was successful in her application to London School of Economics to study for a diploma in psychiatric social work. At the end of the two years, anxieties from her chaotic upbringing came to a head and she entered four years of psychoanalysis with Dr Margaret Collins. After emerging from a period of anxiety and depression, she applied to do a master's degree in psychiatric social work at Smith College, Massachusetts. At some time in the mid 1960s Joan also spent time in Turkey working for the World Health Organization.

== NSPCC 1967–1971 ==
On her return to London, Joan took up a position with the NSPCC as team leader to pioneer research and treatment for battered babies. In 1968 the Battered Child Research Unit was set up in Denver House, Ladbroke Grove and Joan became its first director. Joan's work in the department became renowned and she had many visitors nationally and internationally, as well as a great demand for public talks and media interviews. Her favourite visitor was Dame Eileen Younghusband, a famous international pioneer of social work, who became a mentor to Joan over the next twenty years until her death in 1981. Joan was highly influential in promoting child abuse as a social problem category and wrote prolifically on the subject in various welfare journals.

In 1970 Joan travelled overland to the Middle East and India. On the way she stayed in Kabul, from where she visited the Buddha statues at Bamiyan.

Following a disagreement over the prosecution of a single mother, and a direct challenge to the director of the NSPCC, Joan found herself summarily dismissed in 1972, which in turn brought letters of protest in the Times and many petitions but she was not reinstated.

== Civil Service 1972–1977 ==
Joan's next position was in the Social Services Inspectorate of the Department of Health and Social Services. Over the next five years she advised ministers including Sir Keith Joseph on legislation in connection with abused children, and made appearances as an expert witness in court.

== Cambridge, UK, 1977 ==
At age 57 Joan was approaching compulsory retirement at 60. Fortunately at this time she met an old friend from the convent in Torquay, Professor Mary Douglas, who was now a distinguished anthropologist. Taking some of Mary's books to St Lucia on holiday, Joan realised that she wanted a change of career, to social anthropology. Despite already having an MA in social work, she was accepted onto the undergraduate degree course in social anthropology at Cambridge University, studying at New Hall. She moved to Cambridge in 1977 and made a lifelong friend, Nicola Carmichael, while studying there.

When she graduated in 1979 Joan went off to Bengal where she met her friend Bela whom she knew from the Calcutta riots in 1946. After a brief attempt at anthropological study in Orissa Joan decided this was not for her and returned to Cambridge, becoming a child protection officer representing children as a Guardian Ad Litem.

== Animal Aid Cambridge ==
In 1978 Joan went to protest in Trafalgar Square against the Canadian seal massacre. There she met Jean Pink, founder of Animal Aid, who told her about an anti-vivisection march in Cambridge. Joan attended the march, which was followed by a lecture by Hans Ruesch, and then a few days later Joan and a few others set up Animal Aid Cambridge. The new group quickly organised a small all-night vigil outside the Downing Site in Cambridge, where many animal experiments are carried out.

The new group met at the Friends' Meeting House, run by Quakers, but were eventually evicted because protests at Huntingdon Research Centre (as Huntingdon Life Sciences was formerly called) were a concern to the Quakers.

Joan made another lifelong friend, Hilda Ruse, at Animal Aid meetings from about 1979.

== Animal Rights Cambridge, 1982 ==
Following disagreements, Joan split from Animal Aid Cambridge around 1982 and formed a new group, Animal Rights Cambridge, which still meets today.

A prominent campaign of this era was the protest against Club Row in London, where puppies and kittens were sold in the market with no regard for their welfare. Joan and Hilda went to this protest in 1983 - eventually the sale of pets was stopped. Hilda also took part in Animal Liberation Front raids and some of Joan's rabbits came from such raids.

== Campaigns and protests ==
With Animal Rights Cambridge Joan organised many campaigns against animal abuse. In the mid 1990s, as well as attending protests in Dover and Brightlingsea against the live export of animals to Europe, she staged a hunger strike outside the Ministry for Agriculture, Food and Fisheries against the trade.

Campaigning moved to anti-vivisection after this, with ARC joining the campaign to close down Hillgrove Farm, which bred cats for animal research. Hillgrove eventually went out of business and campaigners stepped up efforts against Huntingdon Life Sciences, forming Stop Huntingdon Animal Cruelty and setting up a protest camp. When Hilda died in 1997, some of her ashes were scattered at HLS.

In July 2004 Joan, aged 85, sailed with Sea Shepherd on the Farley Mowat ship to protest against whaling. She travelled with companion Darren Collis, joining the expedition from Brazil.

By 2004 Oxford University was coming under attack for its plans to set up a new animal laboratory. Joan protested outside the proposed site of the laboratory, undertaking a fast for 72 hours. In 2004 she had become a Buddhist with the Amida Trust and brought a spiritual dimension to protest.

In 2007 Cambridge University also planned to set up a new primate laboratory on the edge of the city. Six national animal rights organisations joined to oppose this plan, with high-profile marches in Cambridge. Animal Rights Cambridge worked with a new organisation, Stop Primate Experiments At Cambridge (SPEAC); actions included a protest at the degree ceremony and a sit down protest in the major road that passed the proposed site. Joan was arrested for initiating this but the authorities were reluctant to prosecute an 88 year old. Joan also conducted another fast in protest.

Even aged 91 Joan was still protesting against vivisection at Cambridge University, during the national University Vivisection Week of Action in 2010.

== Author ==
In 2002, Joan published In the Shadow of Mahatma Gandhi, her account of her life up to the point she moved to Cambridge. Her story of her many adventures was well received and encouraged her to write a sequel in 2009, The Bunny Hugging Terrorist, which covered the rest of her life in Cambridge and her animal rights activism. This led to a feature-length interview with her in the Cambridge Evening News. Continuing the theme of explaining animal activism, she published in 2012 her third book, Animals Betrayed, Interviews with Animal Rights Activists. BBC Radio Cambridgeshire interviewed her about her last book in April 2013.

== Awards ==
Joan received the Mahaveer Award for showing exceptional compassion to animals in 1999 and one of the RSPCA's highest awards, the Lord Erskine Award, in October 2008 for contributions to animal welfare.

== Death ==
Joan died in her sleep on 1 December 2016 with her favourite cat Benji sleeping on her. She was 97. Her funeral service on 14 December was attended by many animal rights activists from all over the country. Obituaries appeared in the Guardian, the Cambridge News as well as the website for Quaker Concern for Animals.

== Bibliography ==
- Joan Court, In the Shadow of Mahatma Gandhi, Selene Press, Cambridge 2002
- Joan Court, The Bunny Hugging Terrorist, Selene Press, Cambridge 2009
- Joan Court, Animals Betrayed, Interviews with Animal Rights Activists, Selene Press, Cambridge 2012

== Family tree ==
Henry Gibson	Penelope Redden
Muriel	Cecil Court	Margery	John Barrett
Peter	Joan	Monica

This abbreviated family tree is based on some of the records at DeadFamilies.com. Joan's cousin Monica was a very well-known witch
