= Taraval and 17th Avenue station =

Muni Metro light rail stop in San Francisco

Taraval and 17th Avenue
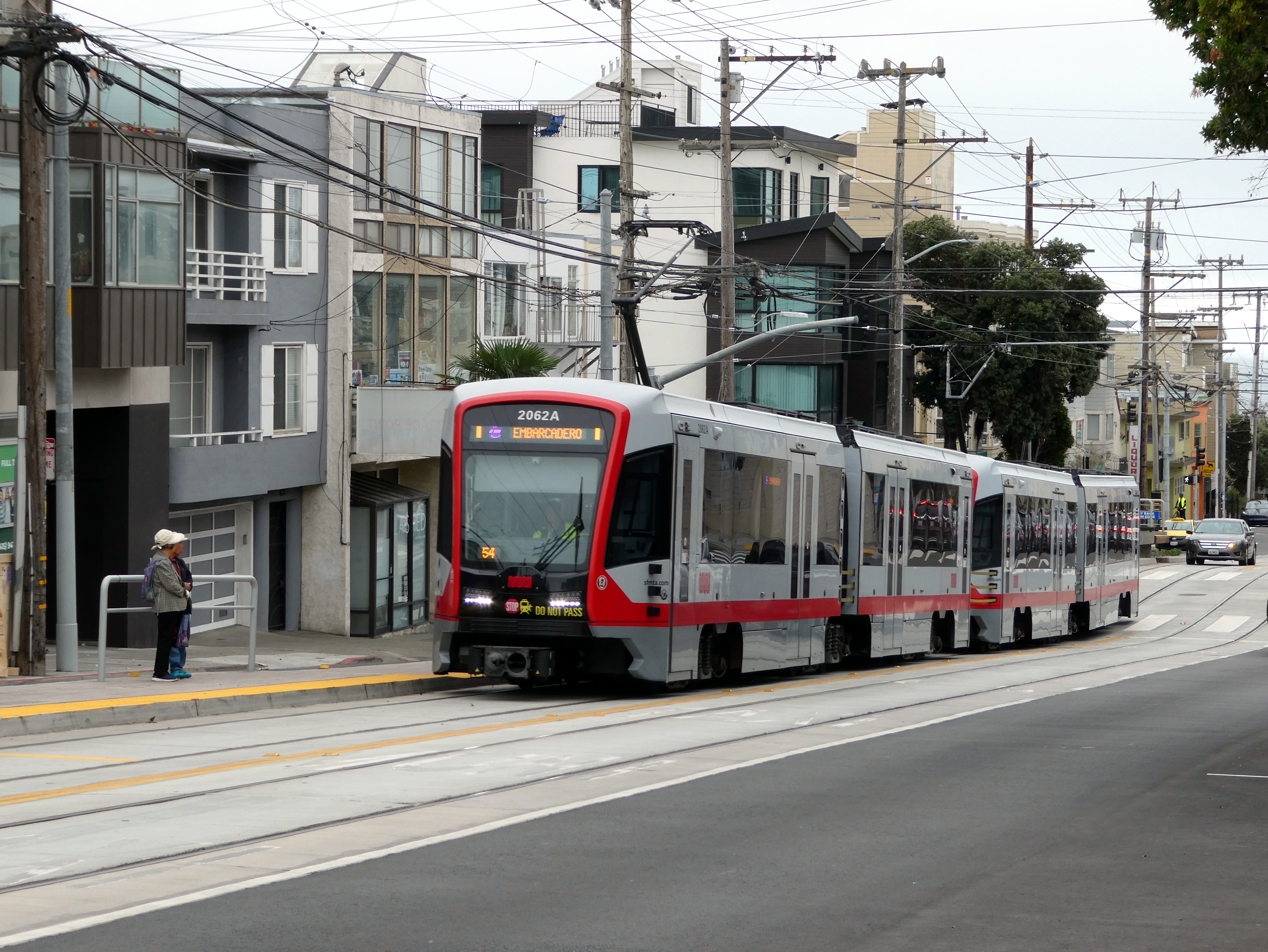
- An inbound train at Taraval and 17th Avenue in 2024

General information
- Location: Taraval Street at 17th Avenue; San Francisco, California
- Coordinates: 37.74315°N 122.47356°W
- Platforms: 1 side platform
- Tracks: 2

Construction
- Accessible: Yes

History
- Opened: April 12, 1919
- Closed: February 25, 2017 (westbound)
- Rebuilt: 2022–2024

Services
Preceding station	Muni	Following station
Taraval and 19th Avenue One-way operation	L Taraval (eastbound)	Ulloa and 14th Avenue toward Embarcadero
Location

Taraval and 17th Avenue station is an eastbound-only light rail stop on the Muni Metro L Taraval line, located in the Parkside neighborhood of San Francisco, California. The stop opened with the first section of the L Taraval line on April 12, 1919. Westbound trains stop at the nearby 15th Avenue and Taraval station.

== Reconstructions ==
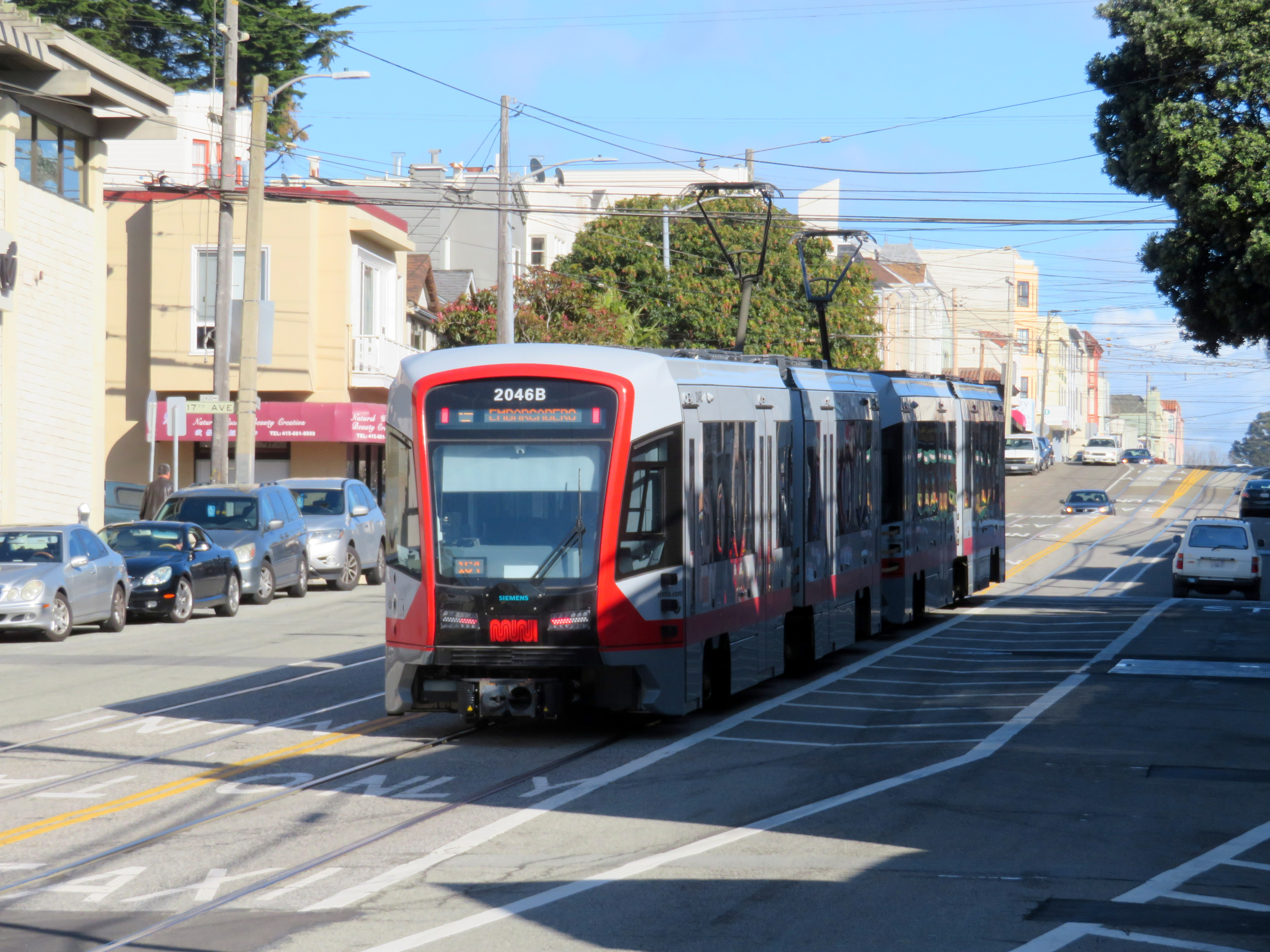
An inbound train at the painted clear zone in February 2019

Like many stations on the line, 17th Avenue had no platforms; trains stopped at marked poles before the cross street, and passengers crossed travel lanes to board. In March 2014, Muni released details of the proposed implementation of their Transit Effectiveness Project (later rebranded MuniForward), which included a variety of stop changes for the L Taraval line. The 17th Avenue stop was one of several stops that would be eliminated to increase stop spacing and reduce travel time. On September 20, 2016, the SFMTA Board approved the L Taraval Rapid Project.

Early implementation of many changes, including stop eliminations, occurred on February 25, 2017. Only the outbound stop at 17th Avenue was eliminated; the inbound stop was temporarily kept in response to neighborhood concerns, as it is adjacent to a Safeway store. If further study indicated the stop should be retained, a concrete boarding island would be installed during the main construction phase beginning in 2018. In November 2017, Muni staff officially proposed to remove the stop. In December 2017, the SFMTA Board voted to eliminate the remaining inbound stops at 17th Avenue and 35th Avenue. The stop was to be temporarily closed from February to May 2018, during which time SFMTA staff would study the effects of the closure, and the board would make a final decision in mid-2018.

However, in response to community pressure to retain the stop, Muni released a revised proposal in January 2018. The 17th Avenue inbound stop would be retained; a boarding island east of 17th Avenue and an accessible platform to the west would be built during the project construction, with painted safety zones in the interim. That proposal also called for elimination of the inbound stop at 15th Avenue and Taraval, and for Ulloa and Forest Side to be moved one block west to 14th Avenue. The SFMTA Board approved the plan in July 2018.

On March 30, 2020, all Muni Metro service was replaced with buses due to the COVID-19 pandemic. Muni Metro rail service returned on August 22, 2020, but was replaced again by buses on August 25. Construction on Segment B of the project, between West Portal and Sunset Boulevard, began in January 2022 and was completed in mid-2024. L Taraval rail service resumed on September 28, 2024.
