= 15th Avenue and Taraval station =

Muni Metro light rail stop in San Francisco

15th Avenue and Taraval
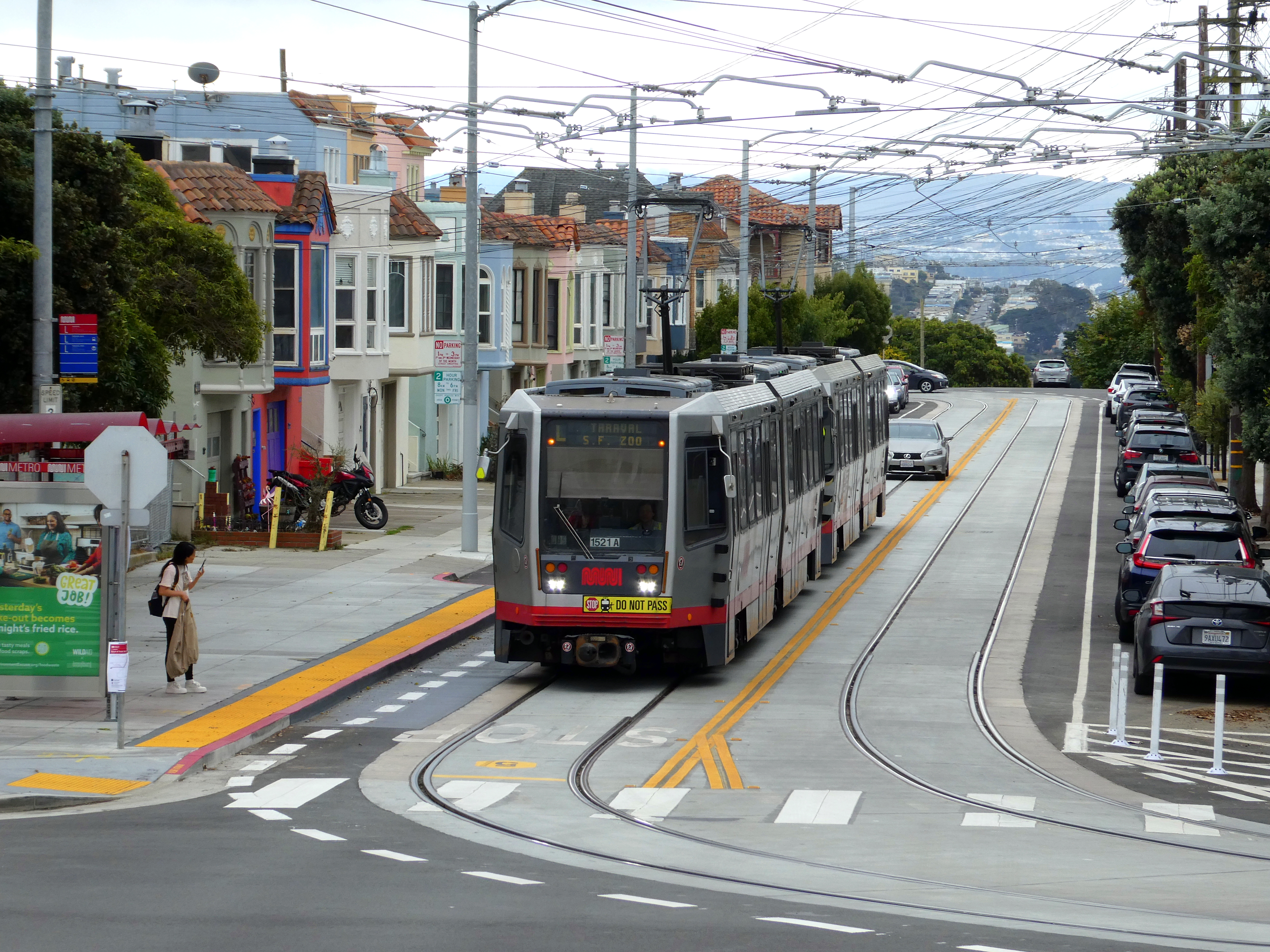
- An outbound train at 15th Avenue and Taraval in 2024

General information
- Location: 15th Avenue at Taraval Street; San Francisco, California
- Coordinates: 37.74325°N 122.47137°W
- Platforms: 1 side platform
- Tracks: 2

Construction
- Accessible: No

History
- Opened: April 12, 1919
- Closed: August 25, 2020 (eastbound)
- Rebuilt: 2022–2024

Services
| Preceding station | Muni | Following station |
|---|---|---|
| Taraval and 19th Avenue toward SF Zoo | L Taraval (westbound) | Ulloa and 14th Avenue One-way operation |
Location

15th Avenue and Taraval station is a westbound-only light rail stop on the Muni Metro L Taraval line, located in the Parkside neighborhood of San Francisco, California. The station opened with the first section of the L Taraval line on April 12, 1919. Eastbound trains stop at the nearby Taraval and 17th Avenue station.

== Reconstruction ==
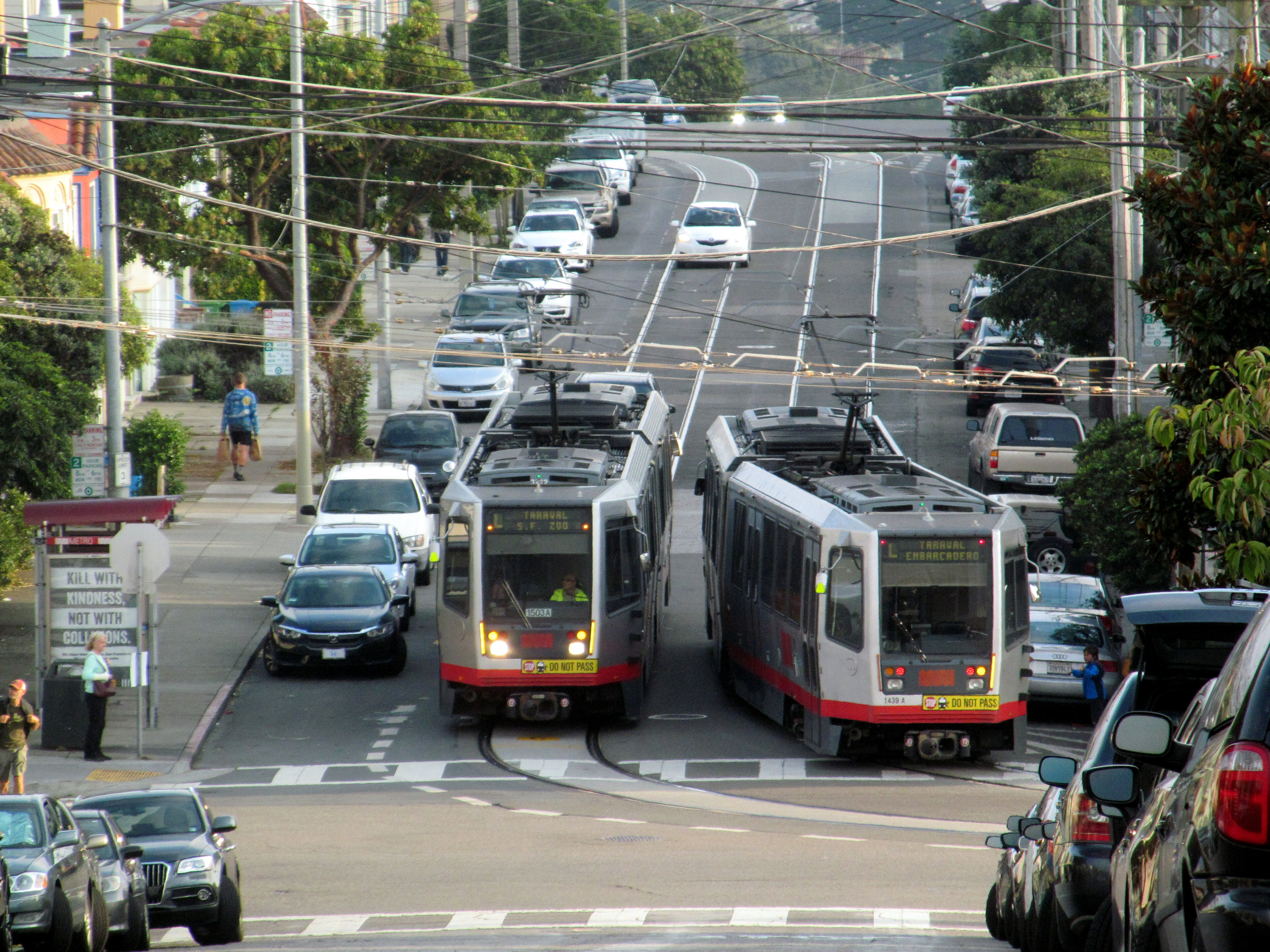
Two trains at the stop in September 2017

Like many stations on the line, 15th Avenue and Taraval had no platforms; trains stopped at marked poles before the cross street, and passengers crossed parking lanes to board. In March 2014, Muni released details of the proposed implementation of their Transit Effectiveness Project (later rebranded MuniForward), which included a variety of stop changes for the L Taraval line. Transit bulbs were to be added to the 15th Avenue and Taraval stop to allow passengers to board without crossing auto traffic; the inbound platform would be moved around the corner onto Taraval.

On September 20, 2016, the SFMTA Board approved the L Taraval Rapid Project. Construction was to occur from 2018 to 2020. As proposed in 2014, a bulb was to be added at the existing outbound stop location, with a second bulb at the relocated inbound stop.

However, in January 2018, Muni offered a revised proposal in response to community pressure not to close the inbound stop at Taraval and 17th Avenue. The inbound stop at 15th and Taraval would be closed; inbound riders would use the new platform east of 17th Avenue, or the relocated Ulloa and 14th Avenue stop. The outbound stop would remain in service, with the previously planned bulb constructed. The SFMTA Board approved the plan in July 2018.

On March 30, 2020, all Muni Metro service was replaced with buses due to the COVID-19 pandemic. Muni Metro rail service returned on August 22, 2020, but was replaced again by buses on August 25. This was the last use of the inbound stop at Taraval and 15th Avenue. Construction on Segment B of the project, between West Portal and Sunset Boulevard, began in January 2022 and was completed in mid-2024. L Taraval rail service resumed on September 28, 2024.
