= Ilka Gedő =

Hungarian artist (1921–1985)

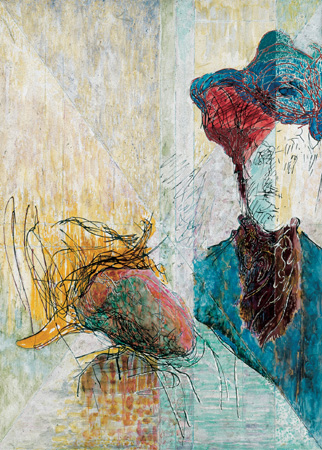
- Double Self-Portrait, 1985, Oil on photographic paper laid down on canvas, 58 x 42 cm
- Born: Gedő Ilka; 26 June 1921; Budapest, Hungary
- Died: 19 June 1985 (aged 63); Budapest, Hungary
- Education: Self-taught, private schools Budapest
- Known for: Painting, drawing
- Notable work: approximately 3,500 drawings and 152 paintings
- Movement: Expressionism, Modern Art
- Spouse: Endre Bíró

Ilka Gedő (26 May 1921 – 19 June 1985) was a Hungarian painter and graphic artist. Her work survives decades of persecution and repression, first by the semi-fascist regime of the 1930s and 1940s and then, after a brief interval of relative freedom between 1945 and 1949, by the communist regime of the 1950s to 1989. In the first stage of her career, which came to an end in 1949, she created a huge number of drawings that can be divided into various series. From 1964 on, she resumed her artistic activities creating oil paintings. "Ilka Gedő is one of the solitary masters of Hungarian art. She is bound to neither the avant-garde nor traditional trends. Her matchless creative method makes it impossible to compare her with other artists."

== Early life and training ==
Ilka Gedő (1921–1985) was born from the marriage of Simon Gedő and Elza Weiszkopf on 26 May 1921. Her father was a teacher at the Jewish grammar school, her mother worked as a clerk. Some of the leading Hungarian writers and artists of the times were among the family's circle of friends. Ilka Gedő was raised in a family, where she had every opportunity to become an educated and sensitive artist. She went to a secondary school bearing the name Új Iskola (New School). This school offered an innovative curriculum and teaching methods.

Since her early childhood, Ilka Gedő had been continuously drawing, recording her experiences. The series of juvenilias, completely preserved in the artist's estate, can be put into chronological order, and thus one is confronted with a visual diary.

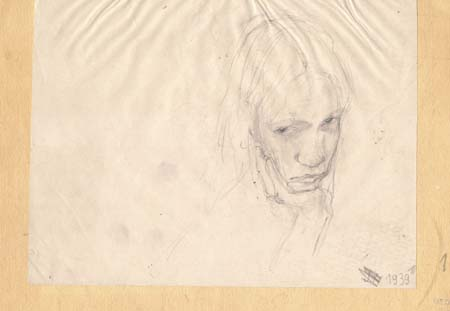
Self-Portrait from 1938, Duke Anton Ulrich Museum, Braunschweig, Germany

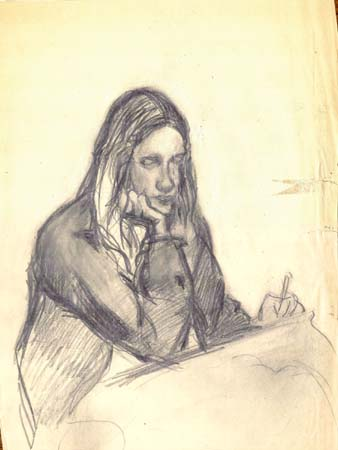
Self-Portrait from 1938, Duke Anton Ulrich Museum, Braunschweig, Germany

She was seventeen years old when she spent her holidays in the Bakony hills, to the west of Budapest. During her holidays she spent all her time drawing the scenery. In the fields she followed the scythe-men with sketchbook in hand, so as to see again and again the recurring movement from the same angle, capturing the rhythm with considerable fluency and sophistication. The drawings, watercolours, and folders that have been preserved from the years 1937-1938 reveal that she already had a complete technical mastery of drawing, and this in spite of the fact that she had never received regular tuition until then.

From the late 1930s till the early 1940s Ilka Gedő was taught by three artists of Jewish origin who were killed by the Nazis at the end of the war.

In 1939, her final examination year Gedő attended the open school of Tibor Gallé (1896–1944). Gedő's second master was Victor Erdei (1879–1944), a painter and graphic artist of the naturalist-impressionist and Art Nouveau style. Gedő's third teacher was the sculptor István Örkényi Strasser (1911–1944). From Strasser Gedő learnt the firmness of sculpturesque modelling and the representation of mass.

After passing her school-leaving examinations, Ilka Gedő seriously considered starting her artistic studies in Paris, but the war interfered, and due to the Jewish laws she could not go to the Hungarian Academy of Art either. Even had Gedő wished to attend the academy, it is likely that she would have found her way barred. With the increase in influence of the Hungarian Fascists, the Arrow Cross Party, the open disenfranchisement of the Jews began in 1938 with the First Jewish Laws followed by the Second and Third in 1939 and 1941.

During the war, she made a living by doing ceramics, but she never stopped creating her series of graphics. Ilka Gedő often visited the town of Szentendre. A small provincial town on the Danube, some twenty miles from Budapest, it provided between the wars a shelter for numerous artists. From 1938 to 1947 Ilka Gedő made pastel drawings of the town, taking her forms and colours directly from nature. The colours red, vivid yellow, dark brown, blue and green reach a high intensity of colourfulness.

Up until the early 1940s, together with other young artists, Ilka Gedő also visited the studio of Gyula Pap (1899–1982) who was a former disciple of Johannes Itten and a teacher of Bauhaus.

During these years, up to 1944, Gedő made intimate studies, mainly in pencil of family life. She began a series of self-portraits which were to continue to the end, in 1949, of the first stage of her artistic career.

In 1942 Ilka Gedő participated in the exhibition, organized by the Group of Socialist Artists and titled Freedom and the People that took place at the Centre of the Metal Workers' Union.

== Drawings made in the Budapest Ghetto ==
On 19 March 1944, eight German divisions invaded Hungary. The persecution of Hungarian Jewry began in earnest. At unparalleled speed almost all of Hungary's provincial Jews were deported to concentration camps in Poland, where most of them were killed. (The Hungarian Jewish community lost 564,500 lives during the war including 63,000 before the German occupation.)

Despite protests by church leaders and Miklós Horthy's hesitant attempts to halt the deportations, by the summer of 1944 about 200,000 Jews were herded together in the Budapest ghetto and in specially designated houses. Following the unsuccessful attempt by Horthy to take Hungary out for the war, the Arrow Cross party carried out a military take-over on 15 October 1944. In the ghetto, the worst days of nightmare began. Through sheer luck, Ilka Gedő managed to escape deportation and survived.

In the Budapest Ghetto Ilka Gedő spent most of her time with reading and drawing recording her surroundings, her companions, the old people and children. These drawings are invaluable documents, but they are also allegories of human humiliation and defencelessness. On one of her self-portrait drawings, she presents a frontal view of herself, showing a person who has lost control over her own fate. Accordingly, she has no age, and almost no gender any more.

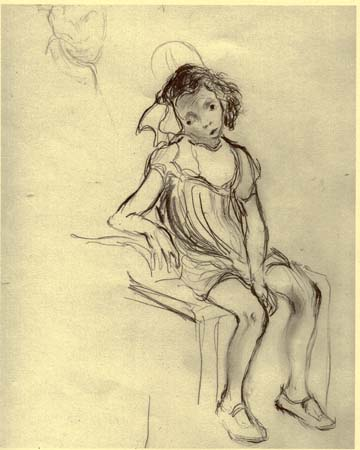
Girl with Bow, 1944, Yad Vashem Art Museum

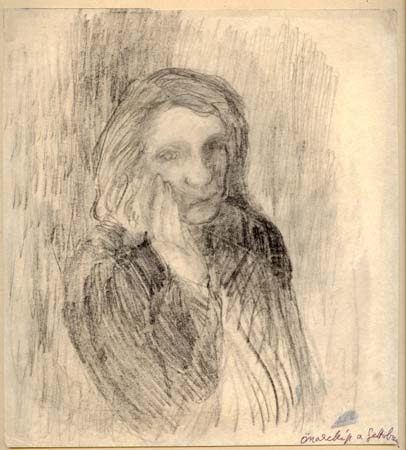
Self-Portrait in the Budapest Ghetto, 1944, Folder 10, Picture 31, Hungarian National Gallery

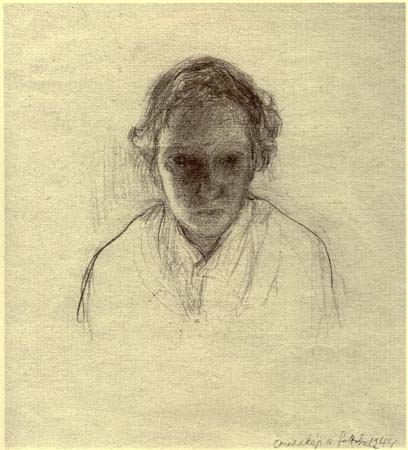
Ilka Gedő Self-Portrait from the Budapest Ghetto, 1944, Yad Vashem Art Museum

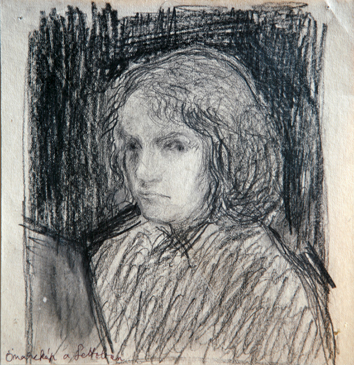
Self-Portrait in the Budapest Ghetto, 1944, Hungarian Jewish Museum

On the last drawing we see the artist's self-portrait with a drawing-board. The eyes, so it seems, stare into nothingness. The ego looks for support in her own self.

== The period between 1945 and 1948 ==
=== Self-portrait drawings (1945–1949) ===
On New Year's Eve 1945, Ilka Gedő met Endre Bíró, who studied chemistry at the University of Szeged, and after the war started to work for a research institute headed by the Nobel Prize-winning Hungarian scientist Albert Szent-Györgyi.

Working in a strictly figurative idiom, the artist needed models and, in addition to family and friends, Gedő found the most convenient model in herself.

Ilka Gedő created self-portraits which, through their sheer honesty and self-exploration, claim the viewer's attention. These works are drawn in a way that evokes straightforward physical reality and emotional sensitivity at the same time. However, doubts were creeping into her efforts to give a faithful and accurate representation of reality: the traditional and composed modelling that had been so typical of her was gradually being replaced by an expressive, eruptive and tense style.

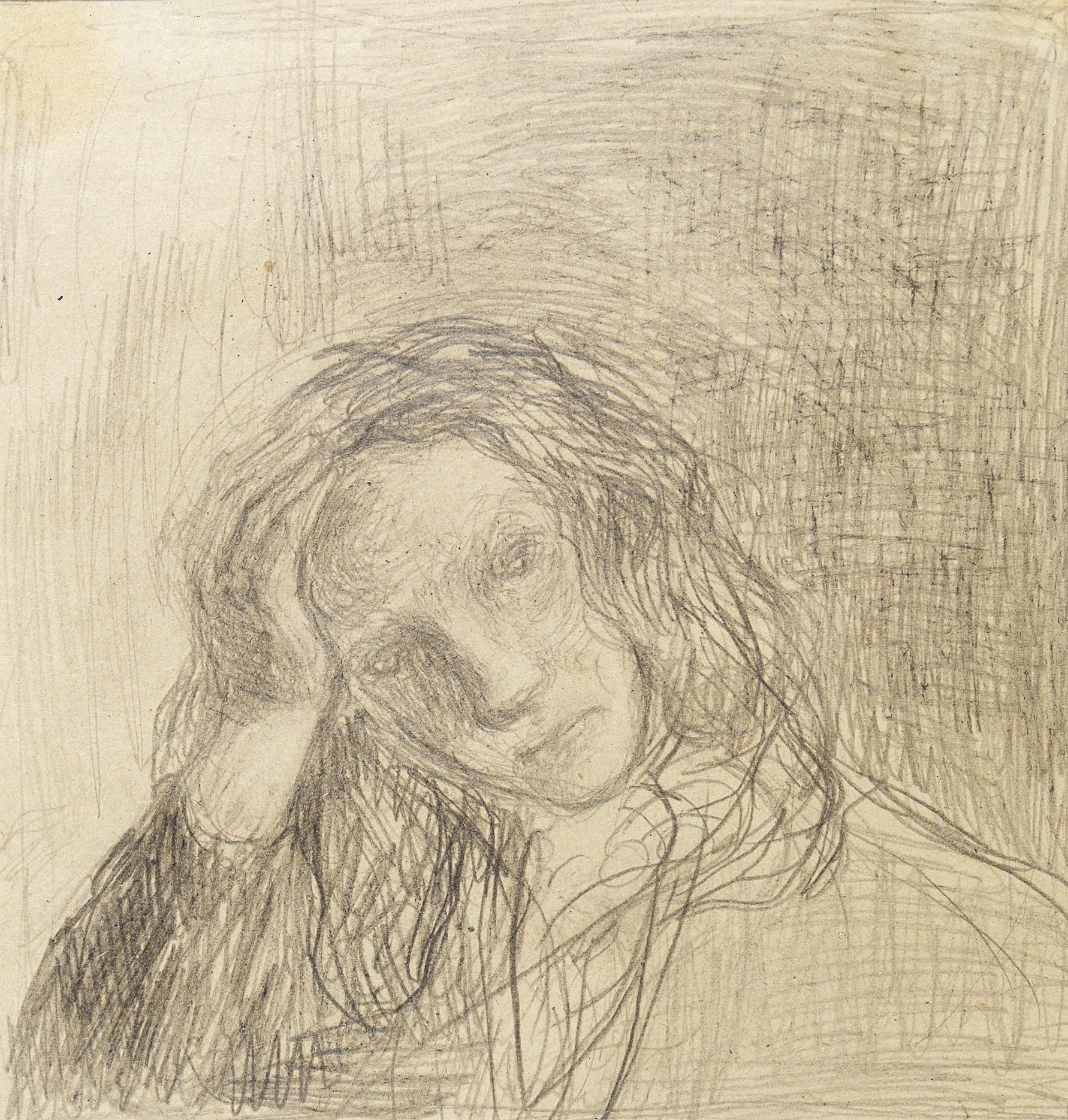
Self-Portrait, 1948, The Hungarian National Gallery

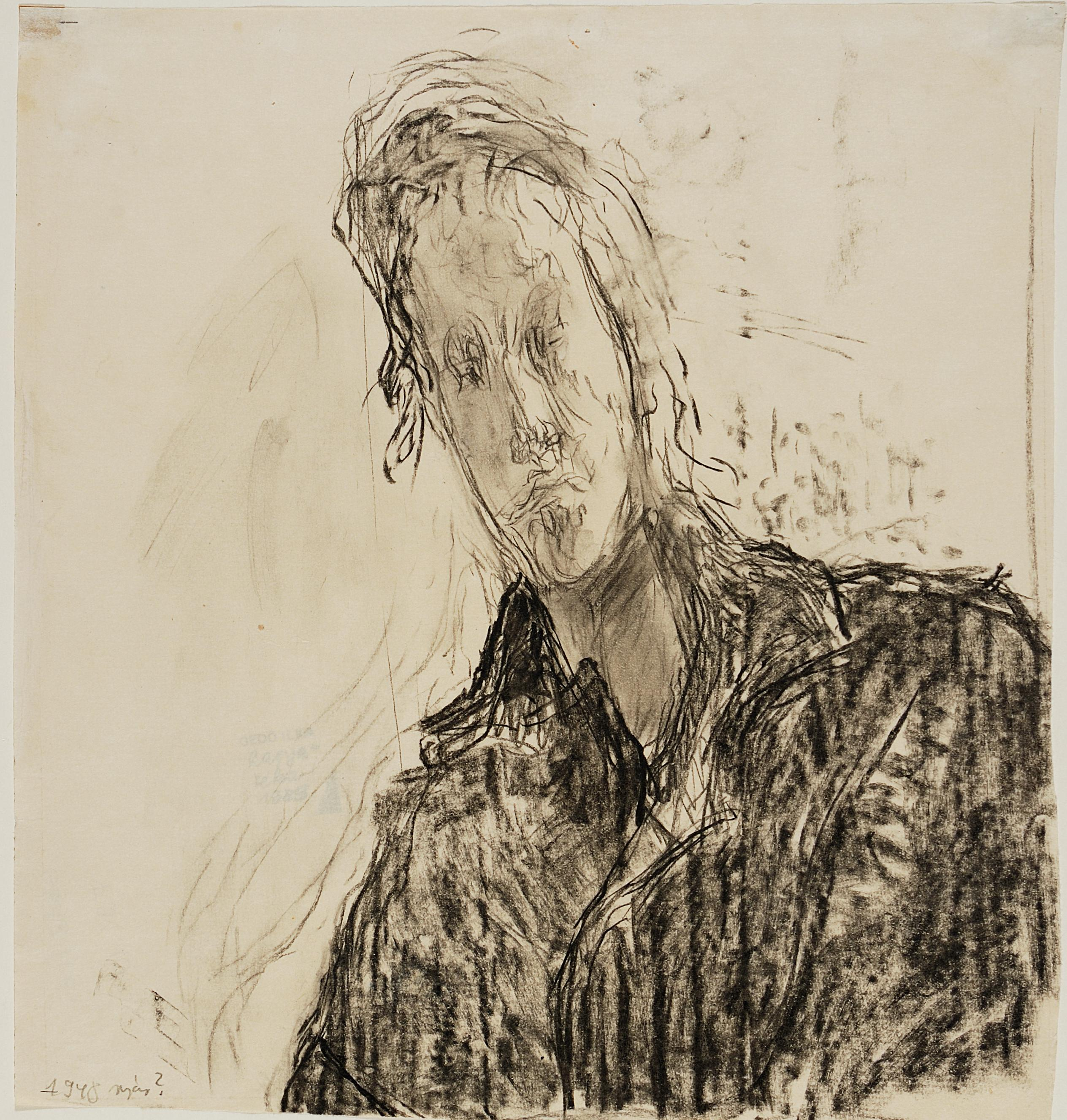
Self-Portrait, 1948, The Hungarian National Gallery

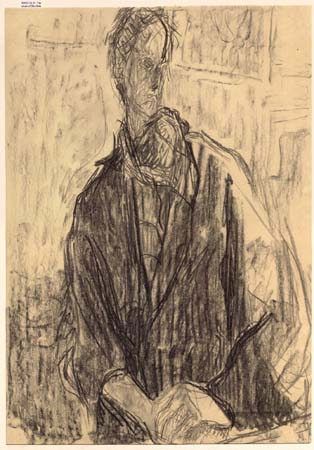
Self-Portrait, 1948, Herzog Anton Ulrich Museum, Braunschweig

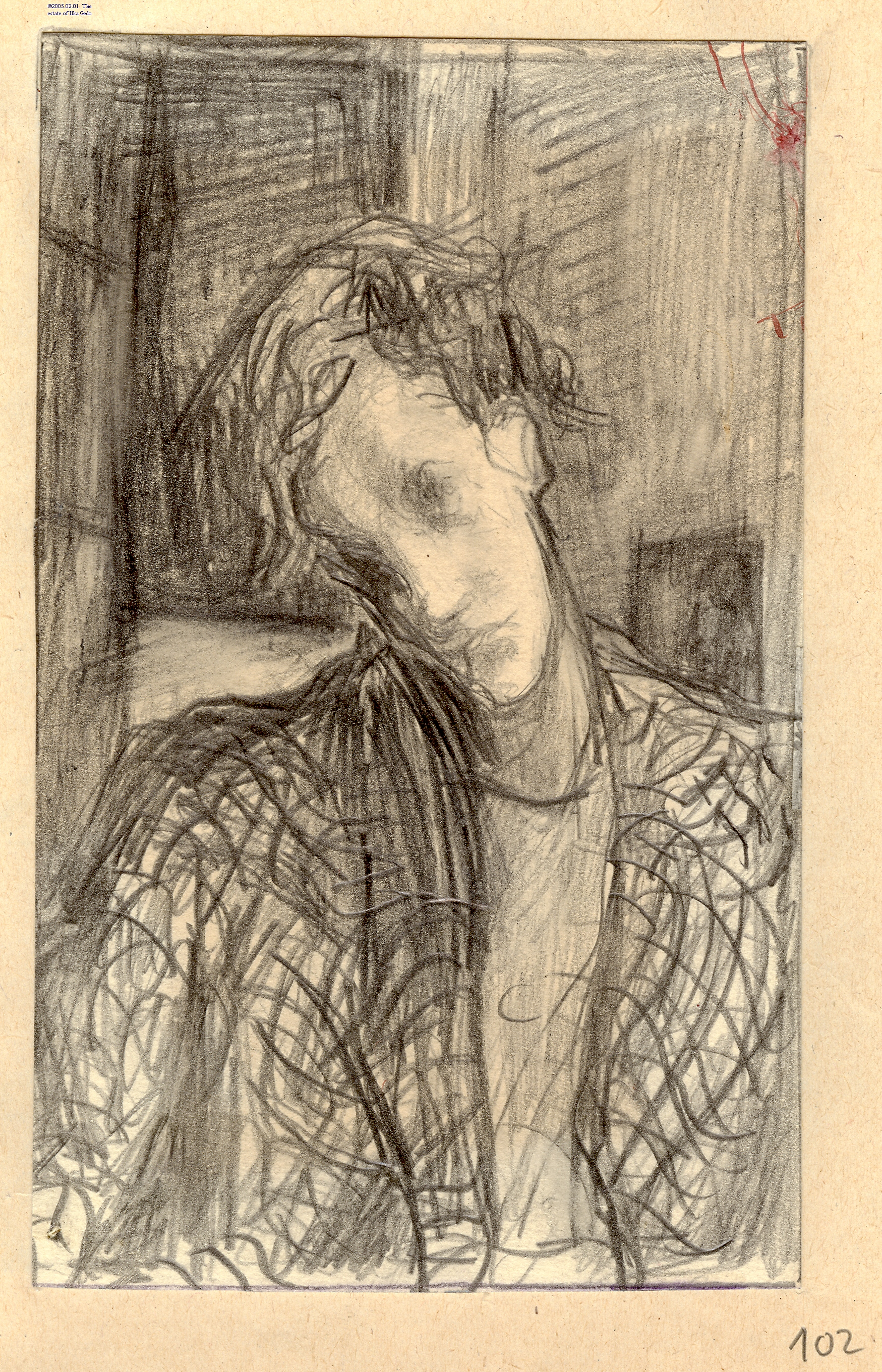
Wistful Self-Portrait, 1946–1947, New York, The Museum of Modern Art

The drawings of the Fillér utca self-portrait series affect the viewer due to their cruel honesty and authentic artistic power.

=== The Ganz Factory drawings (1947–1948) ===
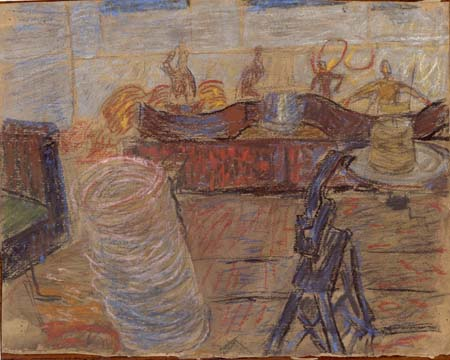
Ganz Factory, 1948, the Albertina

Constantly in search of new subjects, Gedő found in the Ganz Machine Factory, near to her home in Fillér Street, a rich and visually animated environment to draw. Ilka Gedő was granted permission to visit the Ganz Factory with the recommendation of the Free Trade Union of Artists.

As in her self-portraits of the same period, her drawings and pastels of the Ganz Factory, showing a number of recurring topics are quick sketches of momentary experience that reveal an intense spiritual concentration and expressive power. Nervous wavering lines reflect the artist's impressions of industrial work. Ika Gedő's decision to draw in a factory was not politically motivated, and there is no trace of idealisation in these drawings. Dramatic panoramic views of vast interior spaces alternate with compassionate studies of exhausted workers. Ilka Gedő's drawings of the Ganz Factory are realistic, but, more importantly, expressive and moving. In these works space and large forms are presented as novelty. Among the planes and the blocks man is reduced to a schematic figure. The objects that appear in space seem to devour the figures.

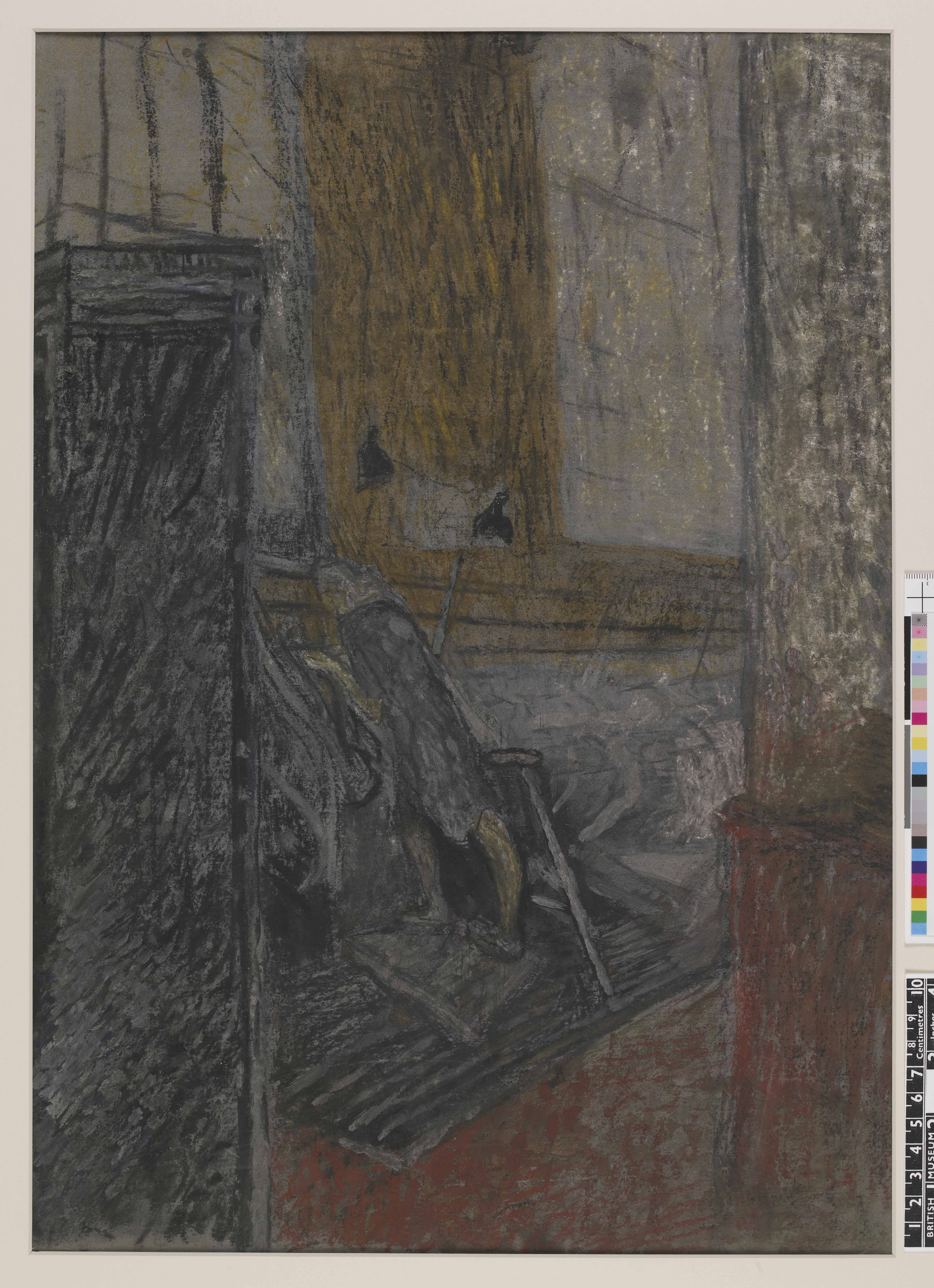
Ganz Factory Drawing, 1948, the British Museum

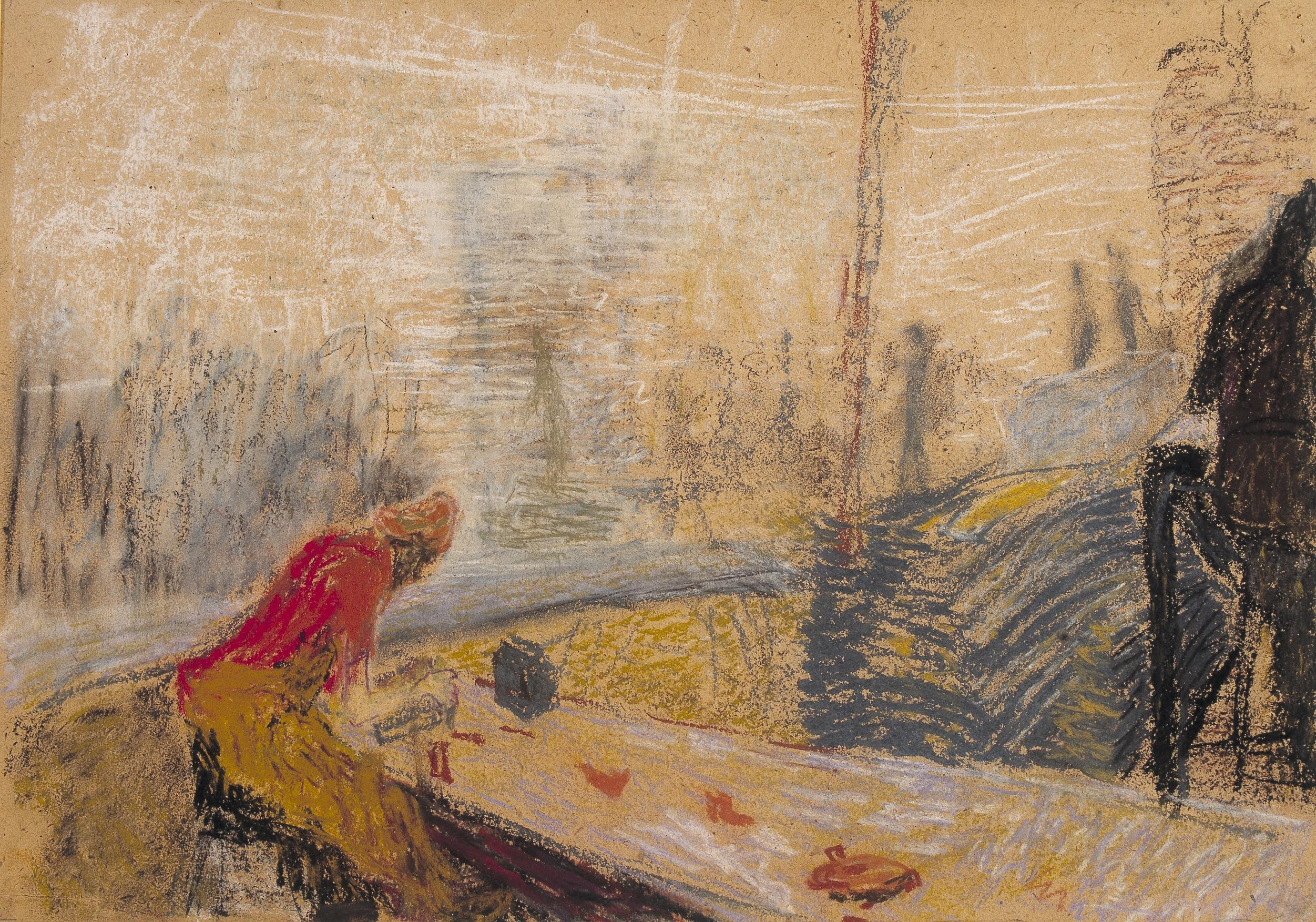
Ganz Factory Drawing, 1949, The Hungarian National Gallery

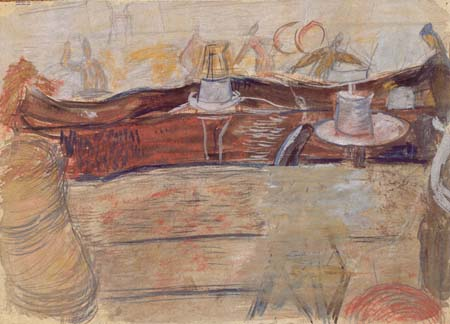
Ganz Factory Drawing, 1948, the Albertina

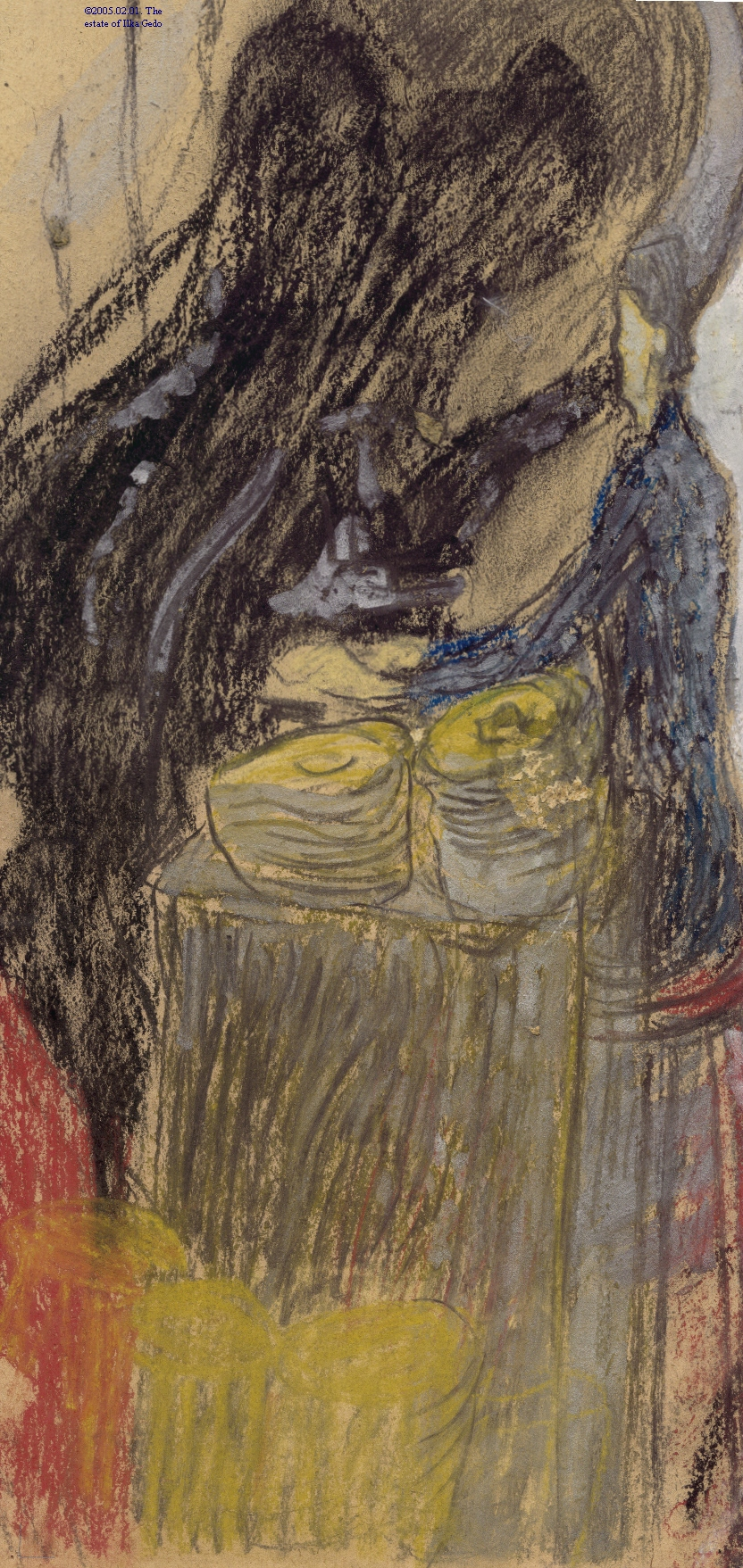
Ganz Factory, 1949, New York, The Museum of Modern Art

=== Table series (1949) ===
The subject of these drawings, a small and always visible table is prosaic, it is always at hand. The lines on these drawings are never the contour of the closing of an area: they always move, thus liberating mysterious energies.

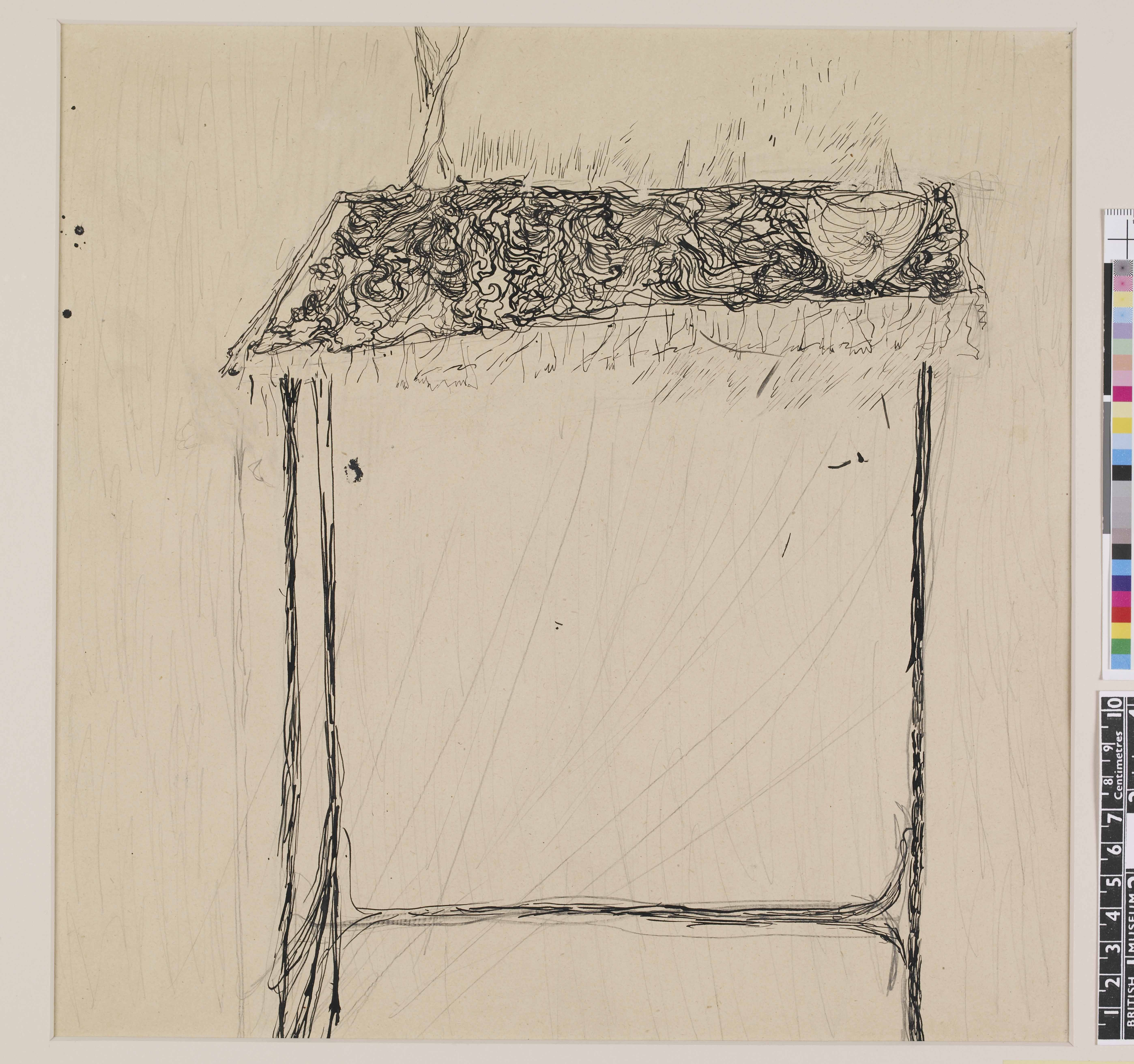
Thonet Table, 1949, the British Museum

== The period of creative silence (1949–1965) ==
Apart from her family and a few friends, no one saw Gedő's drawings at the time they were made. During this period from 1945 to 1949, as well as pastel she started to use oil, but Gedő in a fit of depression and seeing no way out of the dilemmas she was experiencing, destroyed most of the oil paintings produced during these years.

After a remarkable period of freedom between 1945 and 1948, the onset of Communist dictatorship influenced Ilka Gedő's life adversely, being one of the reasons why she gave up artistic activities for sixteen years.

In 1949, Ilka Gedő stopped painting and drawing. Her voluntary abandonment lasted until 1965. During these years, apart from a few colour sketches, she took no pencil or brush into her hand, refusing to do so even in play with her children. Her decision must be explained since it happens very rarely that an artist, who has considered art the meaning and purpose of life, stops creating without being forced to do so.

There were three reasons for stopping artistic work. The first one was the onset of Communist dictatorship, the second the lack of recognition accorded to Ilka Gedő's art (Gedő's friends had a hostile attitude to everything that was representational or figurative, with non-figuration adopted as a means of political expression) and the third was that Ilka Gedő recognised that she could remain true to her talent only by stopping creating art.

When Ilka Gedő stopped making art, she did not altogether abandon the possibility of resuming. She pursued extensive studies in art history. She read extensively about colour theory. She read and made careful notes of Goethe's Theory of Colours, translating long passages from this work. Without these studies the colour world of the second artistic period would not have been possible.

In the mid-1960s the artist put nearly all the drawings of the preceding period in passepartouts and she also selected them into folders according to topics. This activity lasted for many years. The first solo exhibition of the artist was a studio exhibition opened on 15 May 1965 that showed a selection of drawings that were made between 1945 and 1948.

From the beginning of the 1960s, the Communist Party's grip on society loosened somewhat, but Ilka Gedő's isolation continued. Ilka Gedő's situation was made even worse by the fact that a lot of her friends, in contrast to her, made their compromises with the regime, while the talented artists of the younger generation simply opted out of the official arts-policy system and found recognition in the West. In the last two years of the war and in the four-year period of freedom after 1945, Ilka Gedő created a huge number of drawings whose existence had been forgotten by the time she, finally, had her first public exhibition 1980 at the age of fifty-nine.

== Paintings ==
In the 1960s Ilka Gedő started to paint in oil. She made “two-step” paintings. She first drew a sketch of her composition, prepared a mock-up and wrote the name of the appropriate colours into the various fields. She prepared a collection of colour samples, and she wrote where the colours would go in the places where they were ultimately applied. She never improvised on her paintings; instead she enlarged the original plan. On her paintings the strength of cold and warm colours appears to be equal. She created her paintings slowly, amidst speculations, recording the steps of the creative process in diaries so that the making of all the paintings can be traced.

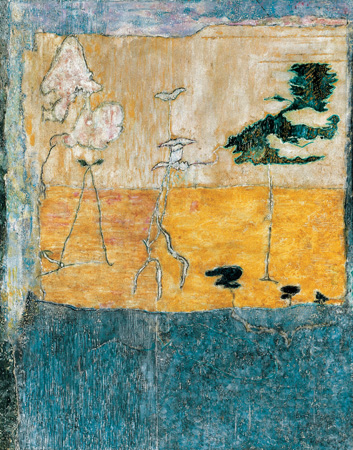
Jardin des Plantes, Paris, 1980, oil on canvas, 57,5 x 46 cm, Washington DC, private collection

The diary entries register all the artist's speculations in connection with the making of the painting. When she put a picture aside she put away the relevant diary and continued to work on another picture. Before resuming work on a picture she always read her earlier diary notes.

Her creative method follows the call of the instincts but does not forget the discipline of the intellect. „Art critics have been quick to point out evidence of her nostalgia for Art Nouveau and Jugendstil. However, Gedő’s real nostalgia is for a lost mythology, and in this she is similar to her fin-de-siècle predecessors. She found this mythology, albeit a personal one, in art, which is capable of evoking and cherishing the memories of an endangered world.”

A well-known Hungarian art historian, László Beke in 1980 evaluates her art: “I believe it is utterly pointless to draw any parallels between your art and the «contemporary» trends, because your art could have been born any time between 1860 and 2000. It draws its inspirations not from the «outside», but from the «inside», and its coherence and authenticity are derived from the relationship this art has with its creator—and this cannot possibly escape the attention of any of the viewers of these works.”

Gedő died on 19 June 1985, at the age of 64, a few months before her discovery abroad. The scene of the breakthrough was Glasgow where the Compass Gallery presented her paintings and drawings in 1985.

== Chronology ==
- 1921: Ilka Gedő was born on 26 May 1921 in Budapest.
- 1939: Ilka Gedő visits the free school of Tibor Gallé.
- 1940: She participates in the second exhibition of OMIKE (Hungarian Jewish Educational Association).
- 1939-42: She receives training from Erdei Viktor.
- 1942: She takes part in the exhibition of the Group of Socialist Painters.
- 1942-43: She attends the free school of István Örkényi-Strasser.
- 1943: Gedő participates in the fifth exhibition of OMIKE.
- 1944: The Budapest ghetto series is born.
- 1945: In the autumn of 1945 Ilka Gedő enrols as a full-time student in the Academy of Fine Arts. However, she leaves the academy after six months. She draws at the school of Gyula Pap.
- 1946: She marries the biochemist Endre Bíró.
- 1947: Birth of her first son, Dániel.
- 1949: She stops her artistic activities.
- 1950: From 1950 on she does not take part in art life. Her interests turn to the philosophy of art, art history and colour theory. She translates extensive passages from Goethe's theory of colour.
- 1953: Birth of her second son, Dávid.
- 1962: The Hungarian National Gallery buys three drawings of the artist.

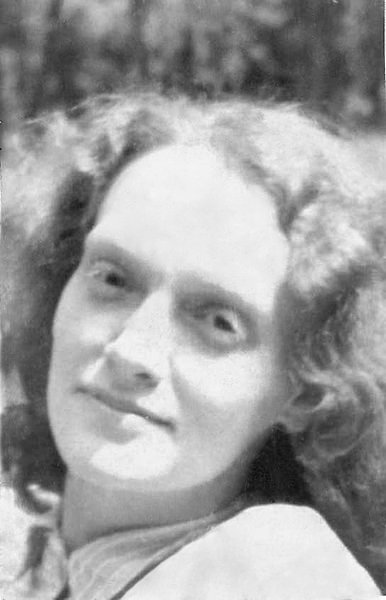
Ilka Gedő around 1960

- 1965: Studio exhibition featuring drawings from the years 1945–1949. She resumes her artistic activities.
- 1969-1970: Spends a year in Paris. She takes part in a group exhibition of the Galerie Lambert.
- 1974: She is admitted to the Association of Visual Artists.
- 1980: Retrospective exhibition in the St. Stephen's Museum of Székesfehérvár, Hungary.
- 1982: Exhibition at the Dorottya Gallery of Budapest. The National Gallery of Hungary buys two of the artist's paintings.
- 1985: Gedő dies on 19 June in Budapest. A solo exhibition of the artist is opened in the Gallery of the Szentendre Art Colony. Another solo exhibition of Ilka Gedő is organized in the framework of the Hungarian Season in Glasgow. This event is extensively covered by the British press.

== Exhibitions ==
One-woman exhibitions in Hungary:

- Studio Exhibition (1965)
- King St. Stephen's Museum, Székesfehérvár, Hungary (1980)
- Dorottya Utca Gallery, Budapest (1982)
- Artists' Colony Gallery, Szentendre, Hungary (1985)
- Palace of Exhibitions, Budapest (1987)
- Gallery of Szombathely (1989)
- Hungarian Jewish Museum, Budapest, [with György Román] (1995)
- Budapest Municipal Picture Gallery, Museum Kiscell (2001)
- Raiffeisen Gallery (2003–2004) (chamber exhibition)
- Hungarian National Gallery (2004–2005)
- Hungarian National Theatre (2013) (chamber exhibition)
- Museum of Fine Arts - Hungarian National Gallery (2021)

One-woman exhibitions abroad:

- Compass Gallery, Glasgow (1985)
- Third Eye Centre, Glasgow (1989)
- Janos Gat Gallery, New York (1994 and 1997)
- Shepherd Gallery, New York (1995)
- Collegium Hungaricum, Berlin (2006)
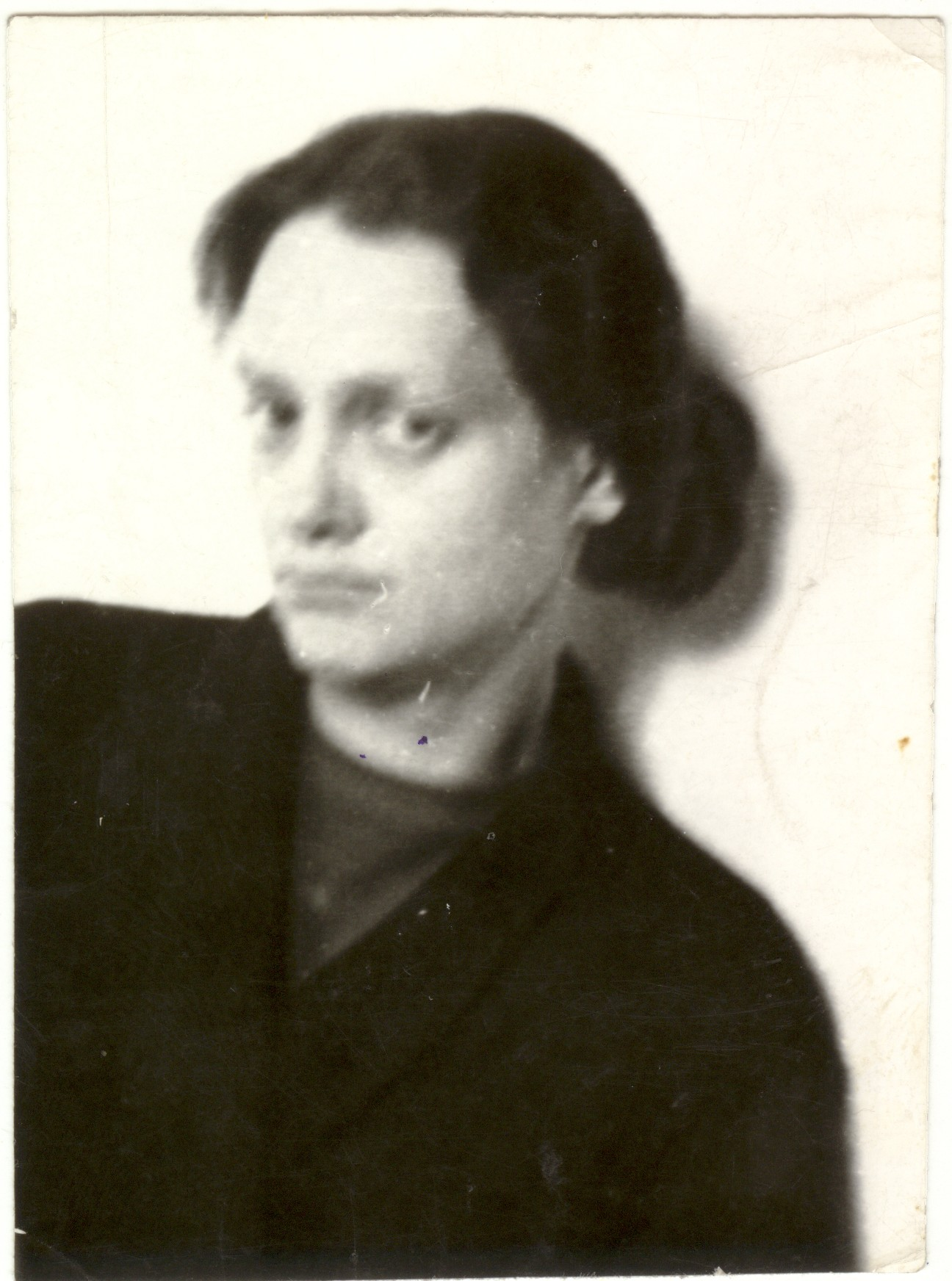
Ilka Gedő, Budapest 1965

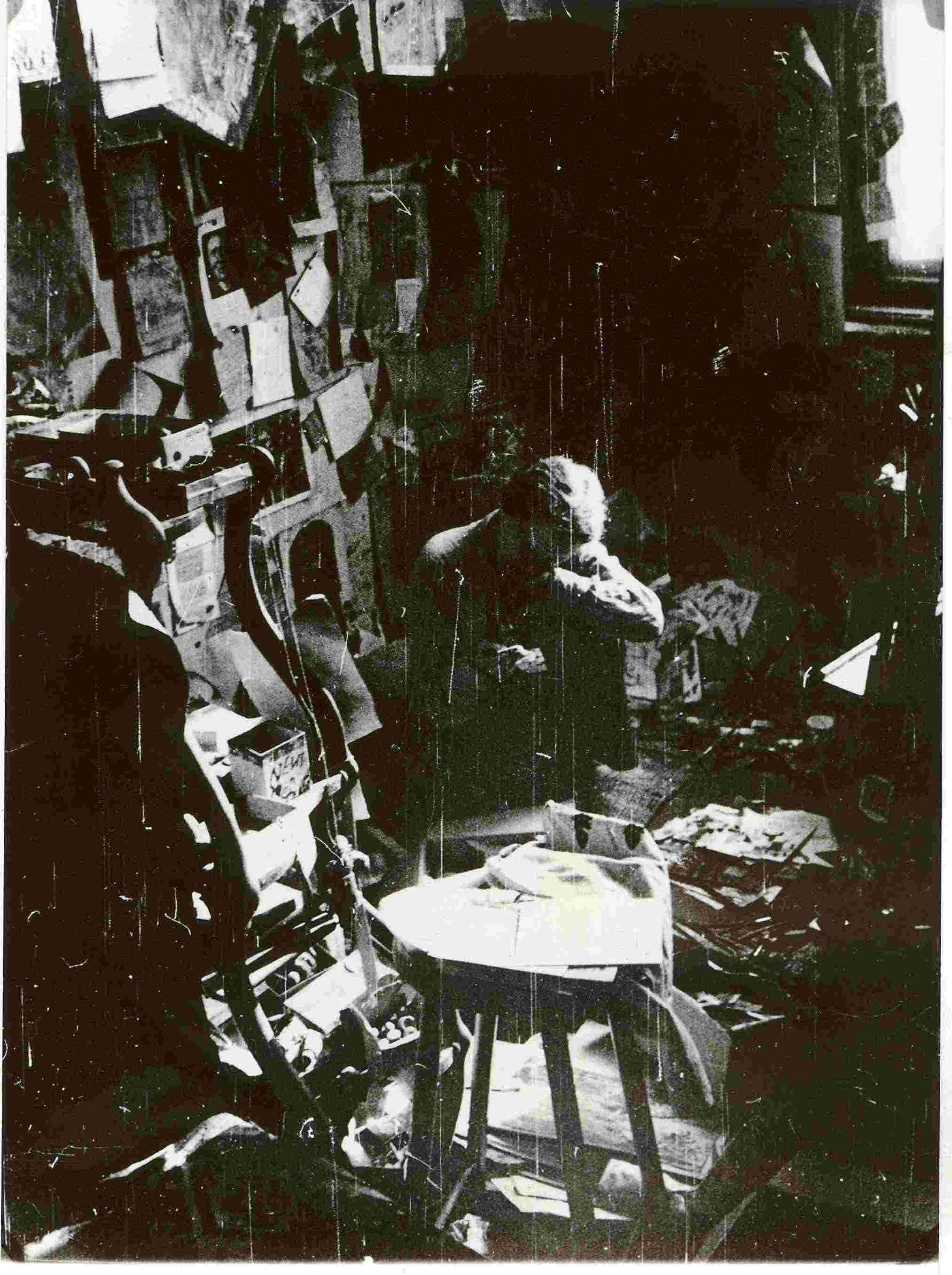
Ilka Gedő in Her Studio, Budapest, 1982

Exhibition Poster of the Third Eye Centre, Glasgow, 1989–1990.

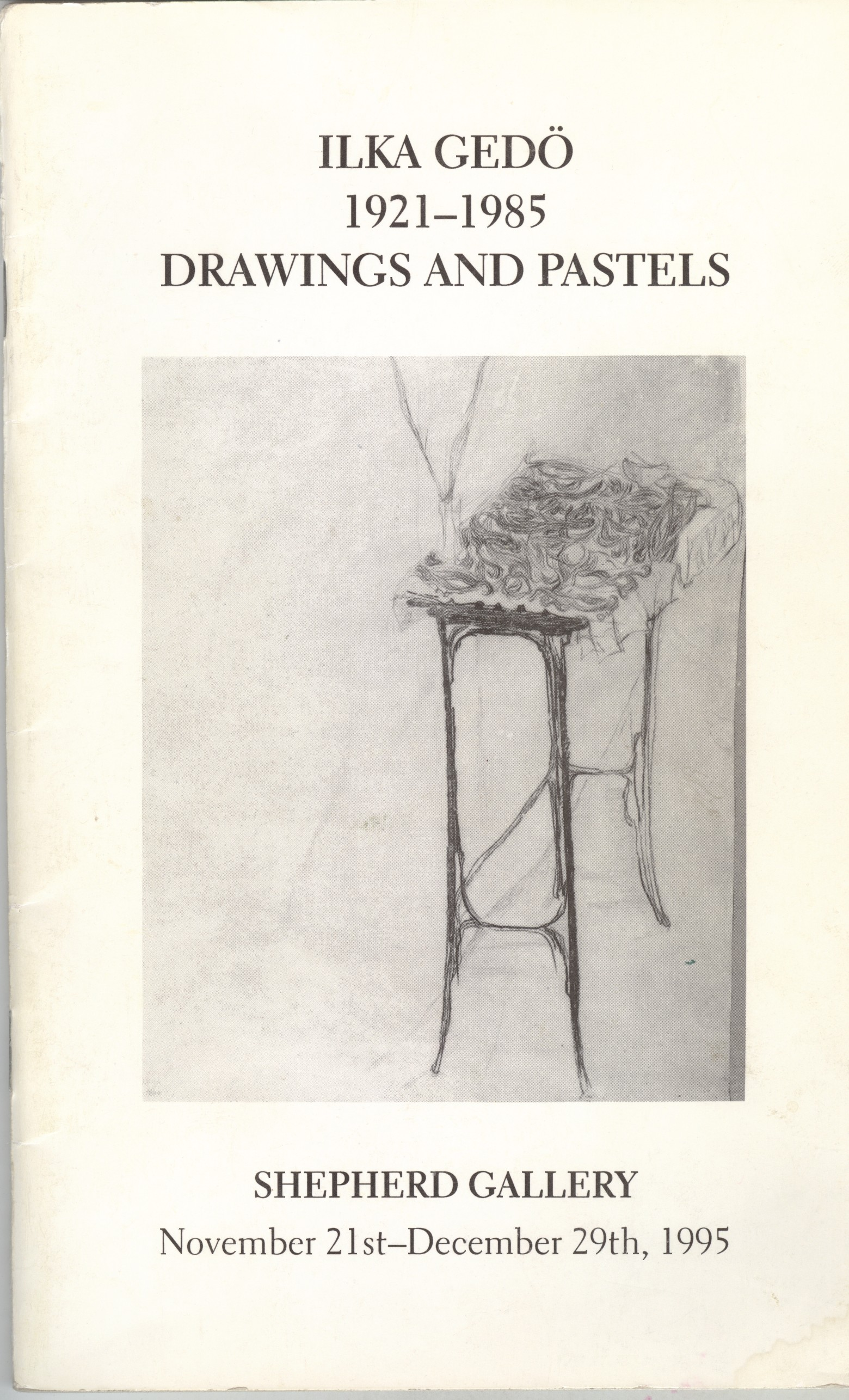
Exhibition Catalogue Cover, New York, 1995

Group exhibitions (a selection)

- 1940: Az OMIKE második kiállítása (Second Exhibition of OMIKE, the Hungarian Jewish Educational Association), Jewish Museum, Budapest
- 1943 Az OMIKE ötödik kiállítása (Fifth Exhibition of OMIKE, the Hungarian Jewish Educational Association), Jewish Museum, Budapest
- 1942: Szabadság és a nép (Freedom and the People), the Headquarters of the Metalworkers' Trade Union, Budapest
- 1945: A Szociáldemokrata Párt Képzőművészeinek Társasága és meghívott művészek kiállítása (The Exhibition of the Society of Artists of the Social Democratic Party and of Invited Artists), Ernst Museum, Budapest
- 1947: A Magyar Képzőművészek Szabad Szervezete II. Szabad Nemzeti Kiállítása (The Second Free National Exhibition of the Free Organization of Hungarian Artists), Municipal Gallery of Budapest
- 1964: Szabadság és a nép, 1934-1944 (The Group of Socialist Artists, 1934–1944), National Gallery, Budapest, Hungary, Memorial Exhibition)
- 1995: Culture and Continuity: The Jewish Journey, Jewish Museum, New York
- 1996: From Mednyánszky to Gedő—A Survey of Hungarian Art, Janos Gat Gallery
- 1995: Áldozatok és gyilkosok/Gedő Ilka gettó-rajzai és Román György háborús bűnösök népbírósági tárgyalásán készült rajzai (Ilka Gedő's drawings of the ghetto and György Román's drawings at the trials of the People's Court of War Criminals), Hungarian Jewish Museum)
- 1996: Victims and Perpetrators /Ilka Gedő’s Ghetto Drawings and György Román’s Drawings at the War Criminal Trials, Yad Vashem Art Museum, Jerusalem
- 1997-1998: Diaszpóra és művészet (Diaspora and Art), Hungarian Jewish Museum, Budapest
- 1998: A Levendel-gyűjtemény (The Levendel Collection), Municipal Museum of Szentendre
- -1999: Voices from Here and There (New Acquisitions in the Departments of Prints and Drawings), Israel Museum, Jerusalem
- 2000: Directions, Fall Season 2000, Janos Gat Galley, New York
- 2002: 20. századi magyar alternatív műhelyiskolák (Alternative Hungarian Workshop Schools of the 20th Century), the joint exhibition of the Lajos Kassák und the Viktor Vasarely Museums
- 2003: Nineteenth Century European Paintings Drawings and Sculpture, Shepherd Gallery, New York
- 2003: Das Recht des Bildes: Jüdische Perspektiven in der modernen Kunst (The Right of the Image: Jewish Perspectives in Modern Art), Museum Bochum
- 2004: Az elfelejtett holocauszt (The Forgotten Holocaust), Palace of Art, Budapest
- 2005: Der Holocaust in der bildenden Kunst in Ungarn (The Holocaust in Fine Arts in Hungary), Collegium Hungaricum, Berlin
- 2014: A Dada és szürrealizmus. Magritte, Duchamp, Man Ray, Miró, Dalí. Válogatás a jeruzsálemi Izrael múzeum gyűjteményéből (Dada and Surrealism. Magritte, Duchamp, Man Ray, Miró, Dalí. A Selection from the Collections of the Israel Museum), joint exhibition of the Israel Museum and the National Gallery, Budapest, Hungary, Budapest (Dada and Surrealism. Magritte, Duchamp, Man Ray, Miró, Dalí.
- 2016: Kunst aus dem Holocaust, Deutsches Historisches Museum, Berlin
- 2019: In bester Gesellschaft--Ausgewählte Neuerwerbungen des Berliner Kupferstichkabinetts, 2009-2019: (In the Best Company—Selected New Acquisitions of the Berlin Kupferstichkabinett, 2009–2019), Kupferstichkabinett (Museum of Prints and Drawings), Berlin
- 2023: Of Mystic Worlds: Works from the Distant Past Through the Present, Drawing Center, New York, March 8–May 14, 2023, Plate 7 & pp. 38–39
- 2024: Leaving Traces, Sixteen Works on Paper by Ilka Gedő (1921-1985), Museum of Fine Arts, Houston, (MFAH), The Nancy and Rich Kinder Building, Gallery 207 - 9 March – 1 September 2024)
- 2024: My Story. Early Memory of the Holocaust in the Works of Eyewitness Artists, Hungarian National Gallery, Building C, 2nd Floor -17 April – 21 July 2024
- 2026: Dedicated Ones Hungarian Women Artists in the First Half of the Twentieth Century, 21 October 2026 – 14 February 2027
- 2026: HER STORY: Women Artists of the Albertina, 30 October 2026 - 14 February 2027

== Works in public collections ==
- The Hungarian National Gallery, Budapest
- The Hungarian Jewish Museum, Budapest
- The King St. Stephen's Museum, Székesfehérvár, Hungary
- The Yad Vashem Art Museum, Jerusalem
- The United States Holocaust Memorial Museum
- The Israel Museum, Jerusalem
- The British Museum, Department of Prints and Drawings
- The Museum Kunst Palast, Düsseldorf, Department of Prints and Drawings
- The Jewish Museum, New York
- The Kupferstichkabinett (Museum of Prints and Drawings), Berlin
- The Albright-Knox Art Gallery, Buffalo, New York, USA
- The Museum of Fine Arts, Houston, Texas, USA
- The Albertina, Vienna
- The Metropolitan Museum of Art, Department of Modern and Contemporary Art, New York
- The Duke Anton Ulrich Museum, Braunschweig, Germany
- The Cleveland Museum of Fine Art
- MoMA, Department of Drawings and Prints, New York
- Städel Museum, Frankfurt am Main, Germany
- Art Collection of the Berlin Academy of Arts

== Literature ==
=== Catalogues ===
- Gedő Ilka rajzai és festményei (Drawings and Paintings by Ilka Gedő) exhibition catalogue, Székesfehérvár, King St. Stephen Museum, Székesfehérvár, Hungary, 1980, ed. by: Júlia Szabó The catalogue in Hungarian and French is available.
- Gedő Ilka, (Ilka Gedő), Budapest, Dorottya Street Exhibition Gallery of the Palace of Arts, 1982, ed. by: Ibolya Ury
- Gedő Ilka (1921–1985) festőművész kiállítása, (The Exhibition of the Painter Ilks Gedő /1921-1985/) Szentendre, Gallery of the Szentendre Arts Colony, 1985, ed. by: András Mucsi
- Gedő Ilka (1921–1985), Budapest, Palace of Exhibitions, Budapest, 1987, ed. by: Katalin Néray
- Gedő Ilka festőművész rajzai a Szombathelyi Képtárban (Ilka Gedő's Drawings at Szombathely Museum), Szombathely, Szombathelyi Képtár, 1989, ed. by: Zoltán Gálig
- Carrel, Christopher (ed.): Contemporary Visual Art in Hungary: Eighteen Artists [edited and designed by Christopher Carrel; exhibition selection Paul Overy, Christopher Carrell, in association with Márta Kovalovszky], Third Eye Centre in association with the King Stephen Museum, Glasgow, 1985
- Áldozatok és gyilkosok/ Gedő Ilka gettó-rajzai és Román György háborús bűnösök népbírósági tárgyalásain készült rajzai / Victims and Perpetrators–Ilka Gedő’s Ghetto Drawings and György Román’s Drawings at the Trial of War Criminals), Budapest, Magyar Zsidó Múzeum, 1995 és Jeruzsálem, Yad Vashem Art Museum 1996, ed. by: Anita Semjén
- Ilka Gedő (1921–1985) Drawings and Pastels, exhibition catalog, New York, Shepherd Gallery, 21 East 84th Street, 1995, ed. by: Elizabeth Kashey
- Directions (Works by Julian Beck, Herbert Brown, István Farkas, Ilka Gedő, Lajos Gulácsy, Knox Martin, György Roman), Fall Exhibition 2000, Janos Gat Gallery, 1100 Madison Avenue, New York, N.Y. 10028,
- Gedő Ilka festőművész kiállítása, (The Exhibition of Ilka Gedő), Budapest, Hungarian National Gallery, 2004, ed. by: Marianna Kolozsváry

=== Group exhibition catalogues ===
- Reform, alternatív és progresszív rajziskolák (1896-1944), (Reform, Alternative and Progressive Darwing Schools), Budapest, Moholy-Nagy University of Art and Design, 2003
- István Hajdu: „The Work of Ilka Gedő”, pp. 85–106 In: The Jewess–Exhibition at the Jewish Museum of Hungary, Budapest, Jewish Museum and Archives of Hungary, 1992
- Hans Günter Golinski és Sepp-Hiekisch Pickard (szerk): Das Recht des Bildes, Bochum, 2003, a drawing on page 21 and biographical info
- Eliad Moreh-Rosenberg Walter Schmerling (Eds.): Kunst aus dem Holokaust, Köln, Wienand Verlag, 2016; there are three drawings in the volume by Ilka Gedő
- Thomas Döring & Jochen Luckhardt: Meisterzeichnungen aus dem Braunschweiger Kupferstichkabinett, Dresden, Sandstein Verlag, 2017; there is a drawing by Ilka Gedő on page 18
- In bester Gesellschaft Ausgewählte Erwerbungen des Berliner Kupferstichkabinetts 2009-2019, Herausgeber: Andreas Schalhorn, Staatliche Museen zu Berlin—Preußischer Kulturbesitz, Berlin, 2019. (A drawing by Ilka Gedő on page 52.)
- „…Half Picture, Half Veil…” Works on Paper by Ilka Gedő (1921-1985), Museum of Fine Arts- Hungarian National Gallery, Budapest, 26 May – 26 September 2021, by Marianna Kolozsváry, András Rényi
- “…félig kép, félig fátyol…” Gedő Ilka (1921-1985) grafikái, Szépművészeti Múzeum – Magyar Nemzeti Galéria, Budapest, 20212. május 26 - szeptember 26 Marianna Kolozsváry, András Rényi

=== Books ===
- Gedő Ilka művészete (1921-1985) György Péter-Pataki Gábor, Szabó Júlia és Mészáros F. István tanulmányai /The Art of Ilka Gedő (1921-1985) Studies by Péter György-Gábor Pataki, Júlia Szabó and F. István Mészáros/ Budapest, Új Művészet Kiadó, 1997
- Hajdu István - Bíró Dávid: Gedő Ilka művészete, (1921–1985), Oeuvre katalógus és dokumentumok 1921–1985,
- István Hajdu–Dávid Bíró: The Art of Ilka Gedő, (1921-1985), Oeuvre Catalogue and Documents, Gondolat Kiadó, Budapest, 2003,
- Bíró Dávid: Gedő Ilka élete és művészete, Budapest, MEK, 2009,
- Bíró Dávid: Ilka Gedő - The Painter and Her Work A Background Report, Budapest, MEK, 2009;
- Bíró Dávid: Ilka Gedő: ihr Leben und ihre Kunst, Budapest, MEK, 2009

=== Journal articles ===
- Henry Clare: "Hungarian Arts in Glasgow" Studio International, 1986, Vol. 199, No. 10123, pp. 56–59
- Júlia Szabó: „Ilka Gedő’s Paintings”, The Hungarian Quarterly, 1987, Winter
- Péter György– Gábor Pataki: “Two Artists Rediscovered–Ilka Gedő and Béla Fekete Nagy”, The Hungarian Quarterly, 1986, Vol. 27. No. 101
- Márta Kovalovszky:„Gedő Ilka festőművész rajzai” (Works on Paper by Ilka Gedő) Vigilia, 1989. október, 795–796. o.
- F. István Mászáros : “Hold-maszkok, tündöklő háromszögek–Gedő Ilka (1921-1985)” (Moon Masks and Glittering Triangles) Nappali Ház, 1993, Vol. V. No. 3
- István Hajdu: “«Könnye kovászba hull»–Gedő Ilka munkái 1946-1948” (Her Tears Fall into the Dough–Works on Paper by Ilka Gedő, 1946-1948” Balkon, 2002, March
- Topor Tünde: „Gedő Ilka művészete” (The Art of Ilka Gedő), Art Magazin, 2003, December
- Géza Perneczky: „Színes könyv Gedő Ilkának” (A Colourful Album for Ilka Gedő) Holmi, Vol. XV. December 2003
- Géza Perneczky: “The Art of Ilka Gedő (1921-1985)” The Hungarian Quarterly, Vol. 45 Autumn 2004, 23–33. o
- Géza Perneczky: "A rajzmappa" (A Folder of Drawings) Holmi, Vol XIX. No. 8. August, 2007, pp. 1042–1043
- Gábor György: „A létező világok legpszeudóbbika–Gedő Ilka kiállítása a Raiffeisen Galériában”(The Most Deceptive of All the Worlds—Ilka Gedő's Exhibition at the Art Gallery of the Raiffeisen Bank), Balkon, November 2003
- Nicole Waldner: "'She Drew Obsessively' – Ilka Gedő’s Legacy Restored” Lilith, August 17, 2021

== Selected oil paintings ==
=== Oil paintings at the Hungarian National Gallery ===
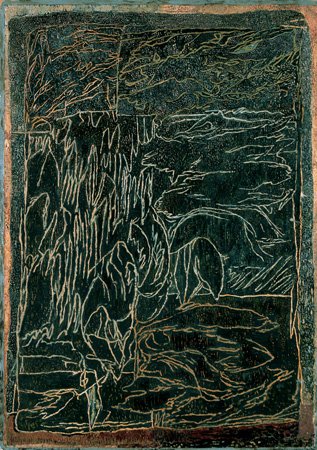
Turreted Rose Garden, 1969–1970, oil on cardboard, 58 x 42 cm

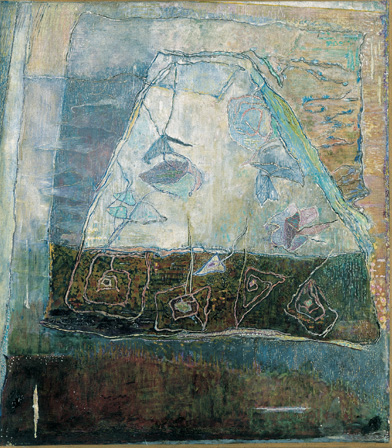
Domed Rose Garden, 1970–72, oil on canvas, 54 x 47 cm

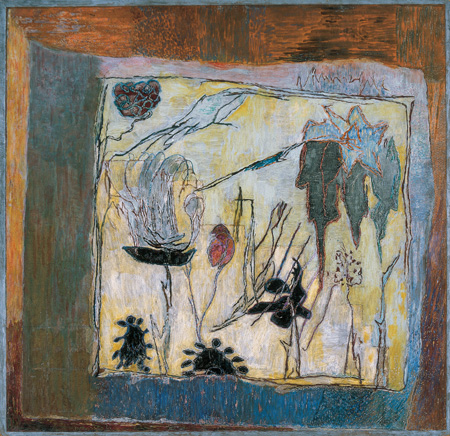
Artificial Flower with Daggers, 1974, oil on wooden board, 61 x 61 cm

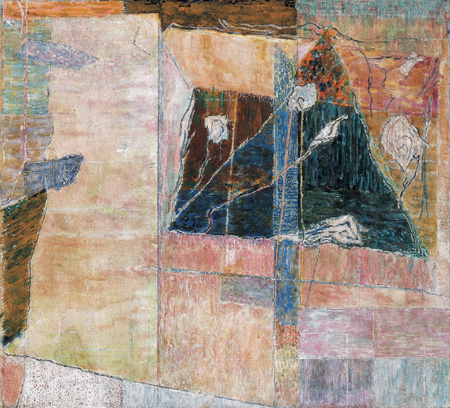
Rose Garden with a Triangular Window, 1979–1980, oil on canvas, 50 x 55 cm

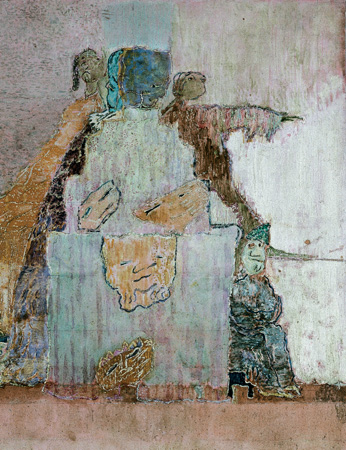
Mask Store, 1980, Oil on paper laid down on canvas, 71 x 50 cm

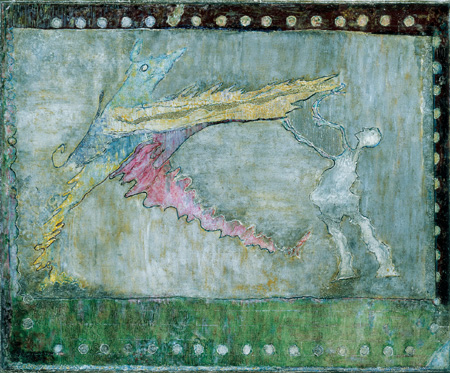
Monster and Boy, 1981, oil on canvas, 55 x 66 cm

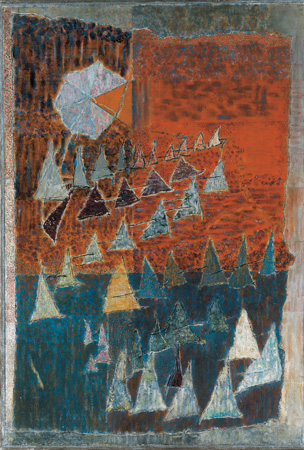
The March of Triangles, 1981, oil on canvas, 84 x 75 cm

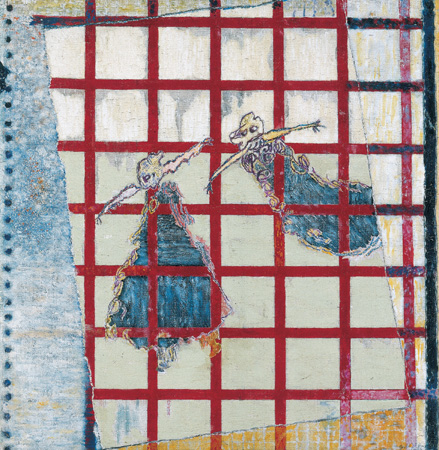
Witches in Preparation, 1980–81, oil on canvas, 59 x 58 cm

=== Oil paintings from the period of 1945 to 1948 ===
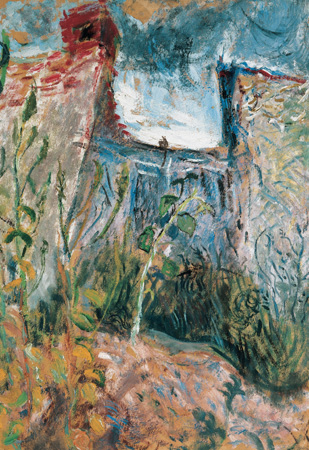
Houses in Szentebdre, 1947, Oil on paper, 53.5 x 38 cm.

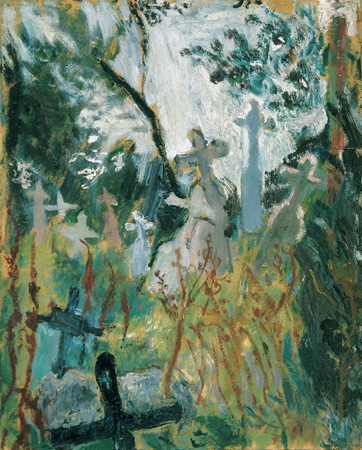
Crosses on Graves, 1947, Oil on paper, 32 x 25 cm..

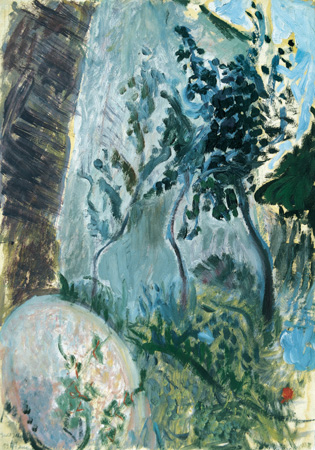
Garden, 1947, Oil on paper, 47 x 39 cm.

=== Paintings made of the basis of pastels ===
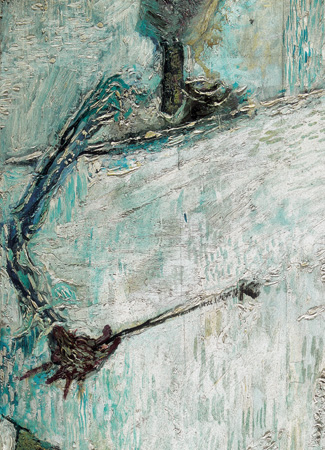
The Painter Bála Veszelszky, 1968, Oil on paper, 46 x 35 cm.

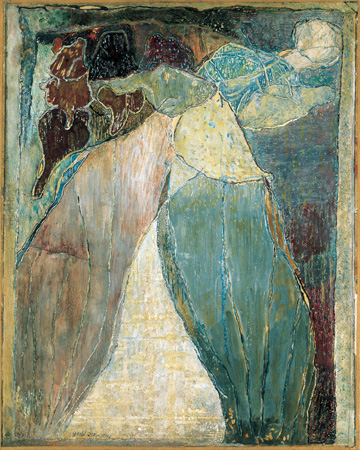
Portrait of Klári Horváth I, 1971–72, Oil on paper laid down on canvas, 60 x 48 cm.

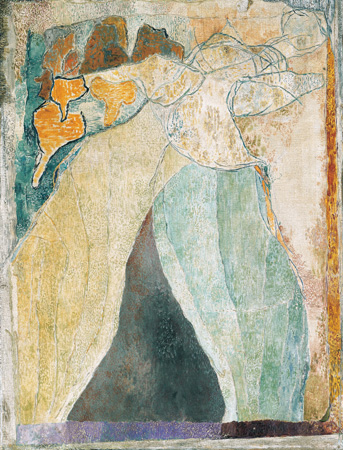
Portrait of Klári Horváth II, 1971–72, Oil on paper laid down on canvas, 61.5 x 47 cm.

=== Rose Garden series ===
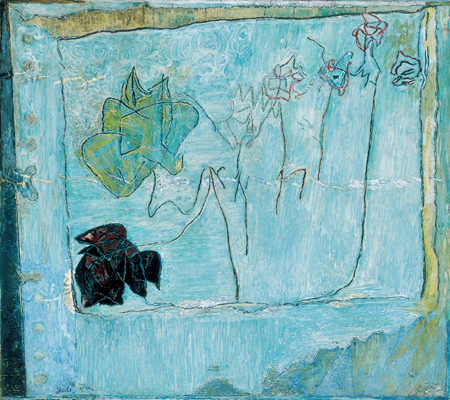
Rose Garden in the Morning, 1974, Oil on paper, 46 x 52 cm.

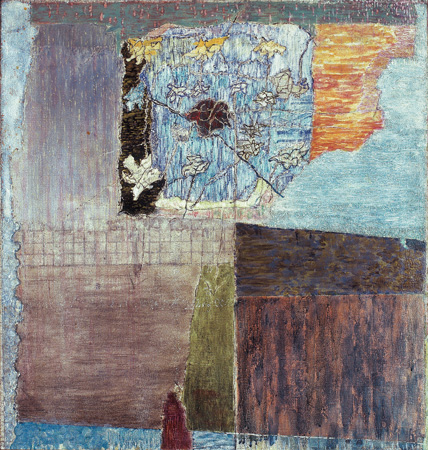
Rose Garded with Window II, 1978, Oil on canvas, 54 x 51 cm.

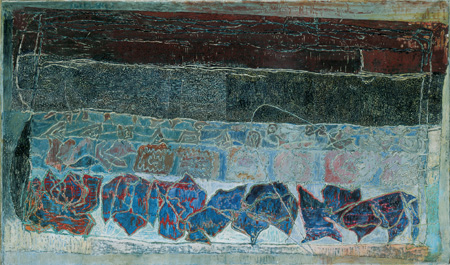
Ribbed Rose Garden, Bluish, 1973–74, Oil on canvas, 40 x 65 cm.

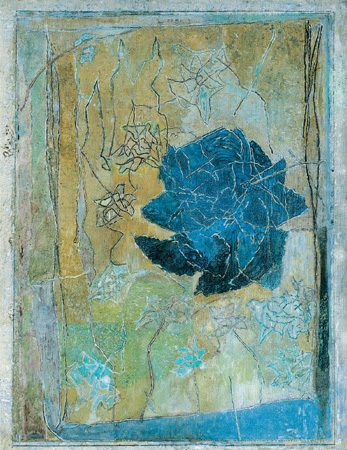
Rose Gardeen with a Yellow Background, 1975–76, Oil on canvas, 56.5 x 60 cm.

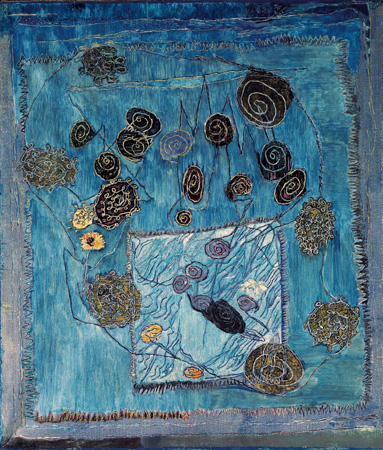
Rose Garden with Window I, 1975, Oil on canvas, 71 x 66 cm.

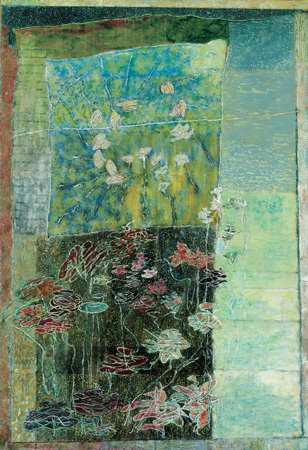
Rose Garden with a Green Background, 1981, Oil on canvas, 72 x 50 cm.

=== Artificial Flower series ===
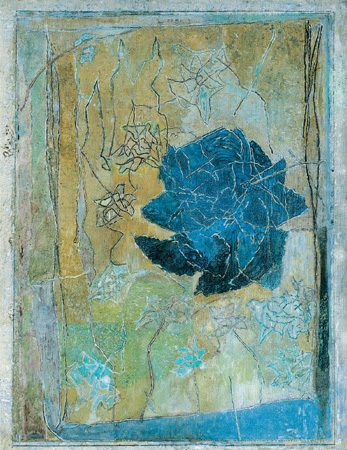
Rose Garden with a Yellow Background, 1975–76, Oil on canvas, 56.5 x 60 cm.

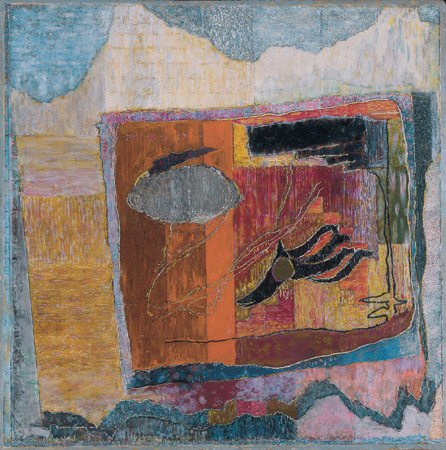
Artificial Flower with "Flypaper” II, 1978, Oil on wooden board, 61 x 61 cm.

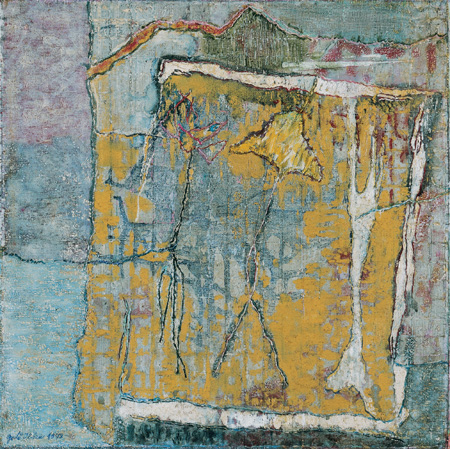
Artificial Flower on a Naples Yellow Background, 1978–1980, Oil on paper laid down on wooden board, 45 x 46 cm.

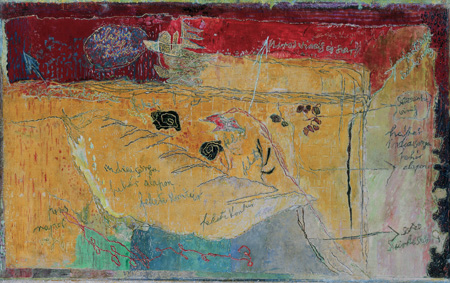
Artificial Flower with Inscription, 1974–75, Oil on canvas, 51.5 x 88 cm.

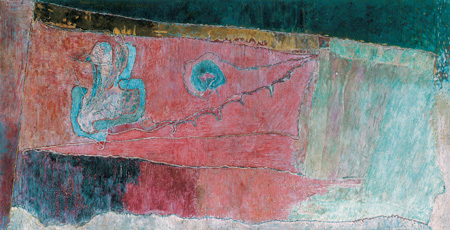
Artificial Flower with a Pink Background, 1974, Oil on paper laid down on canvas, 28 x 54 cm.

=== Circus and other auto-mythological scenes ===
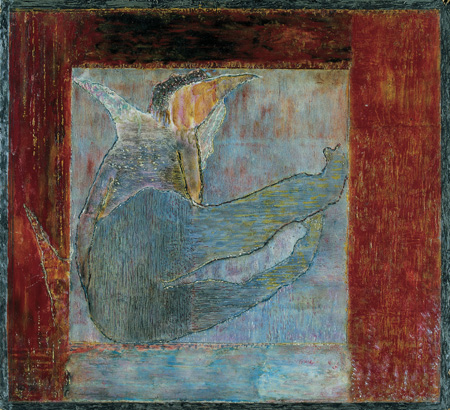
Dejected Angel, 1979, Oil on cardboard, 46 x 49.5 cm.

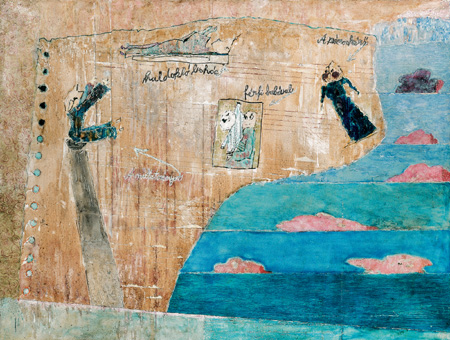
Picture with Inscription, 1981, Oil on photographic paper laid down on canvas, 51 x 66 cm.

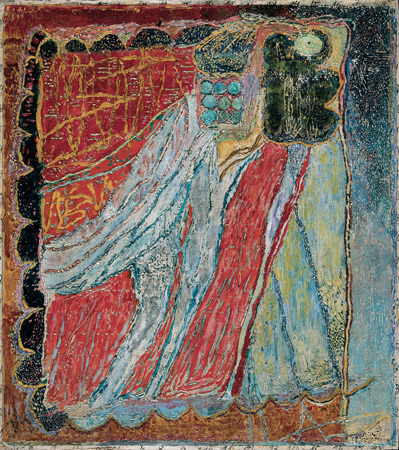
Eve Takes from the Tree of Knowledge, 1971, Oil on canvas, 32 x 29 cm.

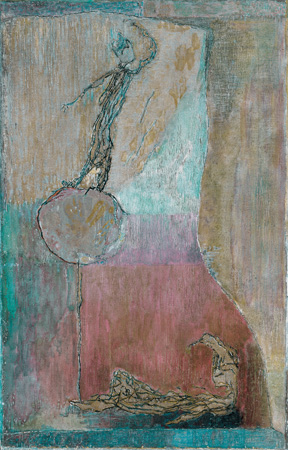
Equilibrist, Circus, 1977, Oil on canvas, 64 x 42 cm.

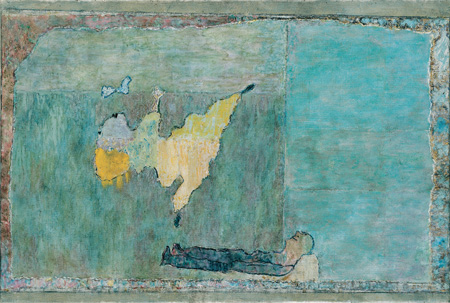
The Butterfly, 1984–85, Oil on canvas, 40 x 69 cm.

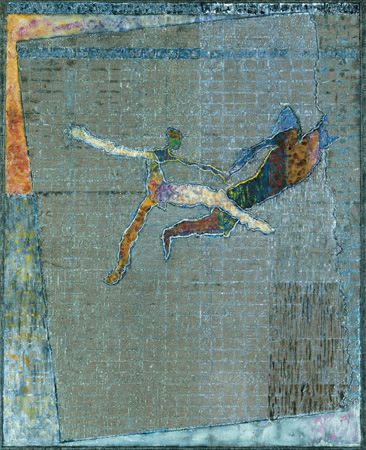
Man and Woman (Kindnap), 1982, Oil on canvas, 80 x 66 cm.

=== Self-portraits ===
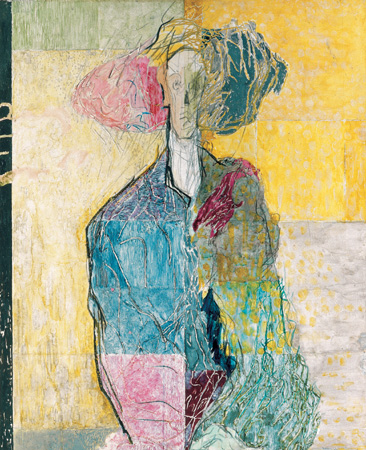
Self-Portrait with a Strawhat, 1984, Oil on photographic paper laid down on canvas, 60 x 48.5 cm.

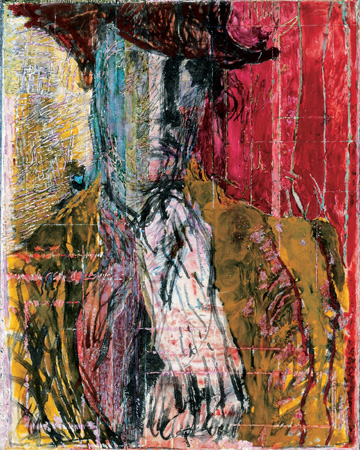
Self-Portrait with a Hat, 1983, Oil on photographic paper laid down on canvas, 60 x 48 cm.
