= Endre Bíró =

Hungarian biochemist

Endre Bíró, N. A. Bíró
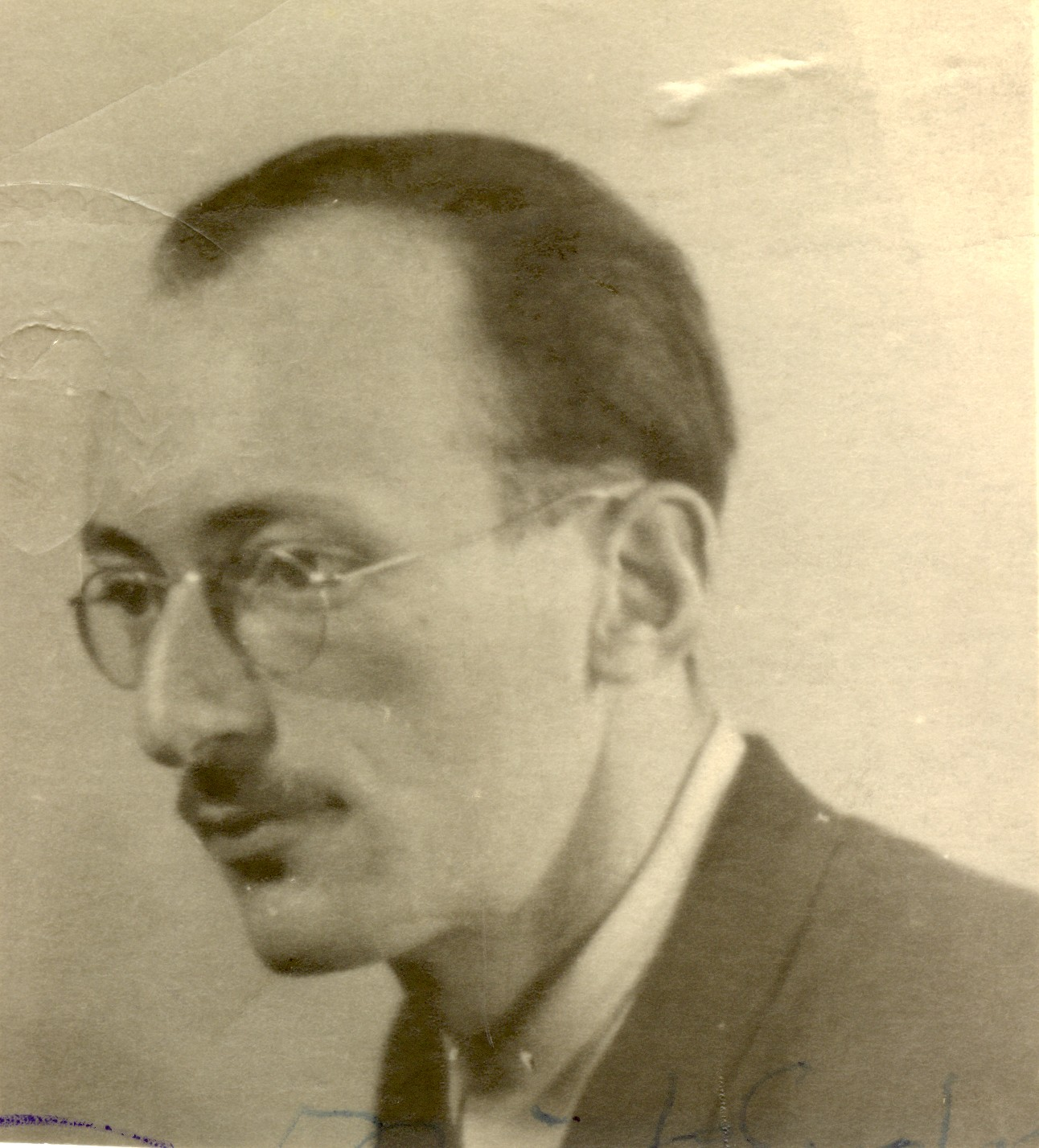
- Endre Bíró in 1946
- Born: 22 April 1919; Budapest, Hungary
- Died: June 13, 1988 (aged 69); Velem, Hungary
- Citizenship: Hungarian
- Spouse: Ilka Gedő
- Children: 2

Endre Bíró (April 22, 1919 – June 13, 1988) was a Hungarian biochemist whose research findings in the biochemistry of the muscle and muscle contraction found international recognition. (His full name is Miklós Endre Bíró translated into English as Nicholas Andrew Bíró hence in his publications in English he is referred to as N. A. Bíró.)

== Early life ==
Endre Bíró was born on April 19, 1919, into a liberal-minded Hungarian-Jewish family as the second son of Lipót Bíró and Emma Gráber.

Bíró got an M.A. degree for teachers in physics and chemistry at Szeged University, called then the Miklós Horthy University of Szeged. ("Szeged presented its own peculiarities. Since the faculty at Budapest was notoriously pro-fascist, Jewish students in the thirties found it easier to get admitted to provincial colleges, working their way around the hated 'numerus clausus'. Thus, each September, Szeged university had more than the five percent quota of Jews. This, in turn, served as a good pretext for riots by right-wing students, mainly members of the Turul organization. Prof N. A. Bíró remembers those days well. Of Jewish origin and from a liberal family to boot, he was accepted into Szeged with the help of a Gentile family friend. In the fall of each year, rioting broke out in Szeged. Forewarned, Bíró and other Jewish students hid across the river in New Szeged until the fighting was over.")

Bíró was awarded the university's prize for his work "The Determination of the Avogadro Number Based on the Examination of Emulsions". He got his Ph.D. degree in organic chemistry and experimental physics in June 1942.

After having finished university, Bíró, taking into account the then prevailing social circumstances, did not even try to look for a job due to Hungary's anti-Jewish laws. ("By 1940 the number of Jews affected by anti-Jewish legislation in Hungary to the extent of being deprived of their livelihood was about 224,000.")

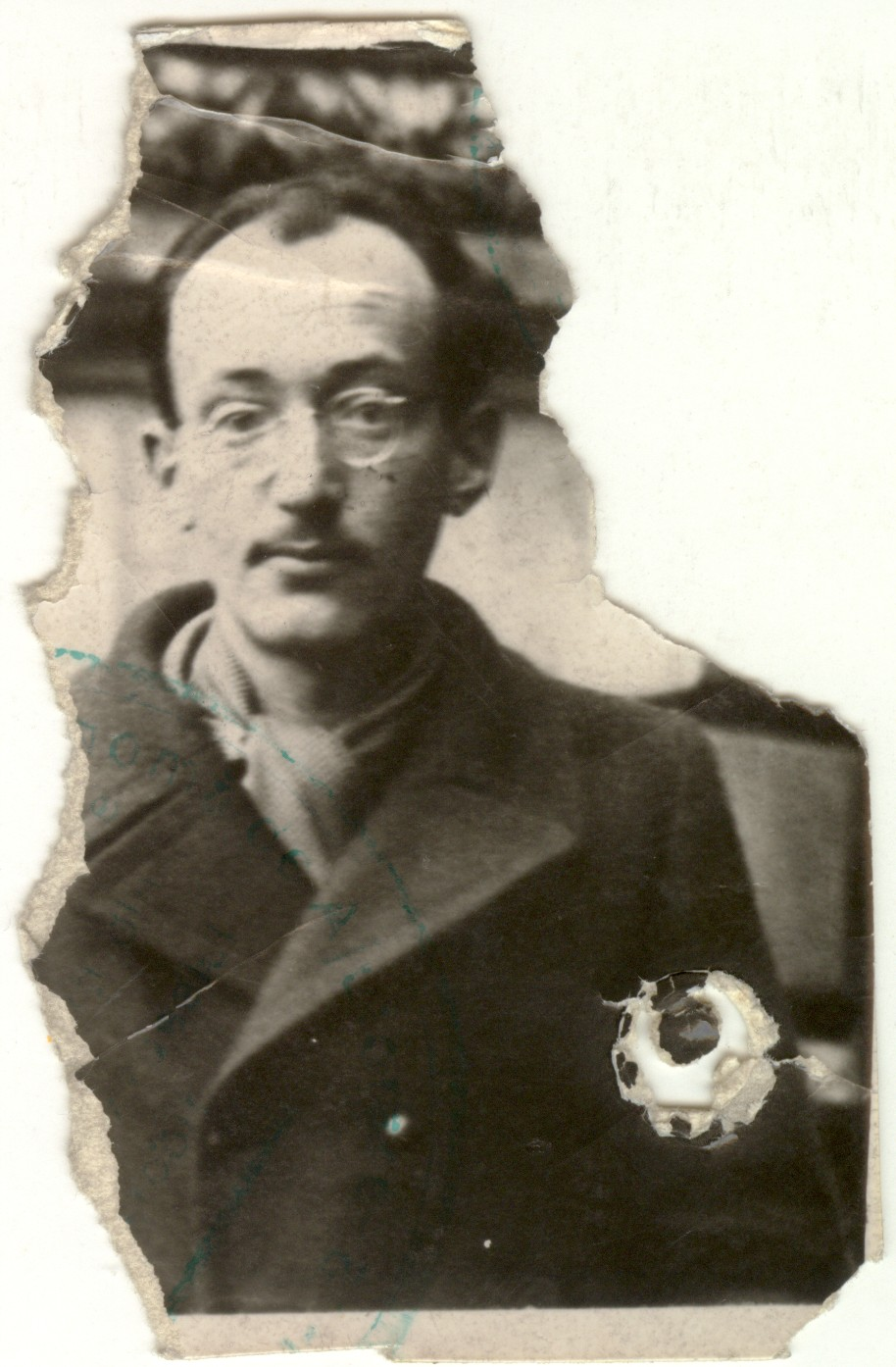
Endre Bíró in Bucharest in January 1945 in a military overcoat. (The size of the original photograph is 5.5 x 4.0 cm)

In 1942 he was drafted into labor service that was required of Jewish men during World War II, who, based on Hungary's anti-Jewish laws, were barred from serving in the Hungarian Army. Draft-aged Hungarian Jewish men were used as auxiliary troops of the Hungarian army. They were not allowed to bear arms, and towards the end of the war they were not allowed to wear military uniforms.

In the summer of 1944 Bíró defected his labor service unit in Transylvania, became a Soviet prisoner of war and before his return to Hungary he lived in Bucharest in 1944 and 1945. Bíró first went to Brassó and then to Bucharest, where he received help from the Joint.

Bíró was living in Budapest when he saw a report in one of the papers informing its readers that Albert Szent-Gyorgyi planned to come to Budapest to start a research institute.

In a motivation letter dated April 9, 1945 written to Albert Szent-Györgyi and preserved among Bíró's papers, he writes, among others, as follows: "As indicated by the enclosed resume, even earlier the reason for my going to university was my intention to devote myself to pure scientific research. I felt I had a scholarly aptitude. However, in the previous regime, due to circumstances beyond my control, I was not able to achieve much in scientific research. I am firmly committed to my decision of dealing with pure scientific research, although I am aware that being a scientist does not mean a high salary."

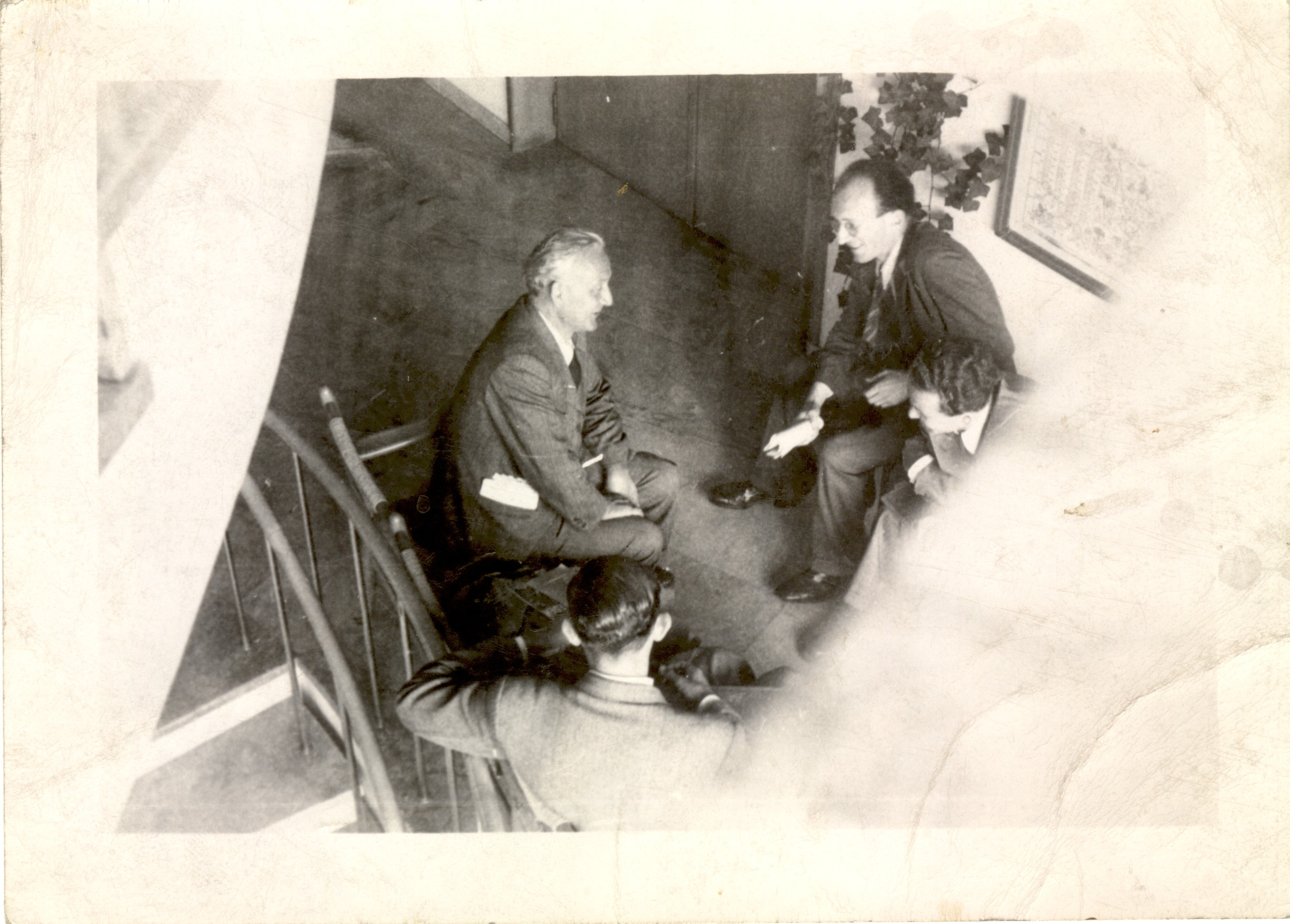
Albert Szent-Györgyi on the left, Tamás Erdős on the far right, next to him Endre Bíró, the person whose face cannot be seen is W.F.H.M. Mommaerts, Stockholm, 1947, the Sixth International Congress of Experimental Cytology

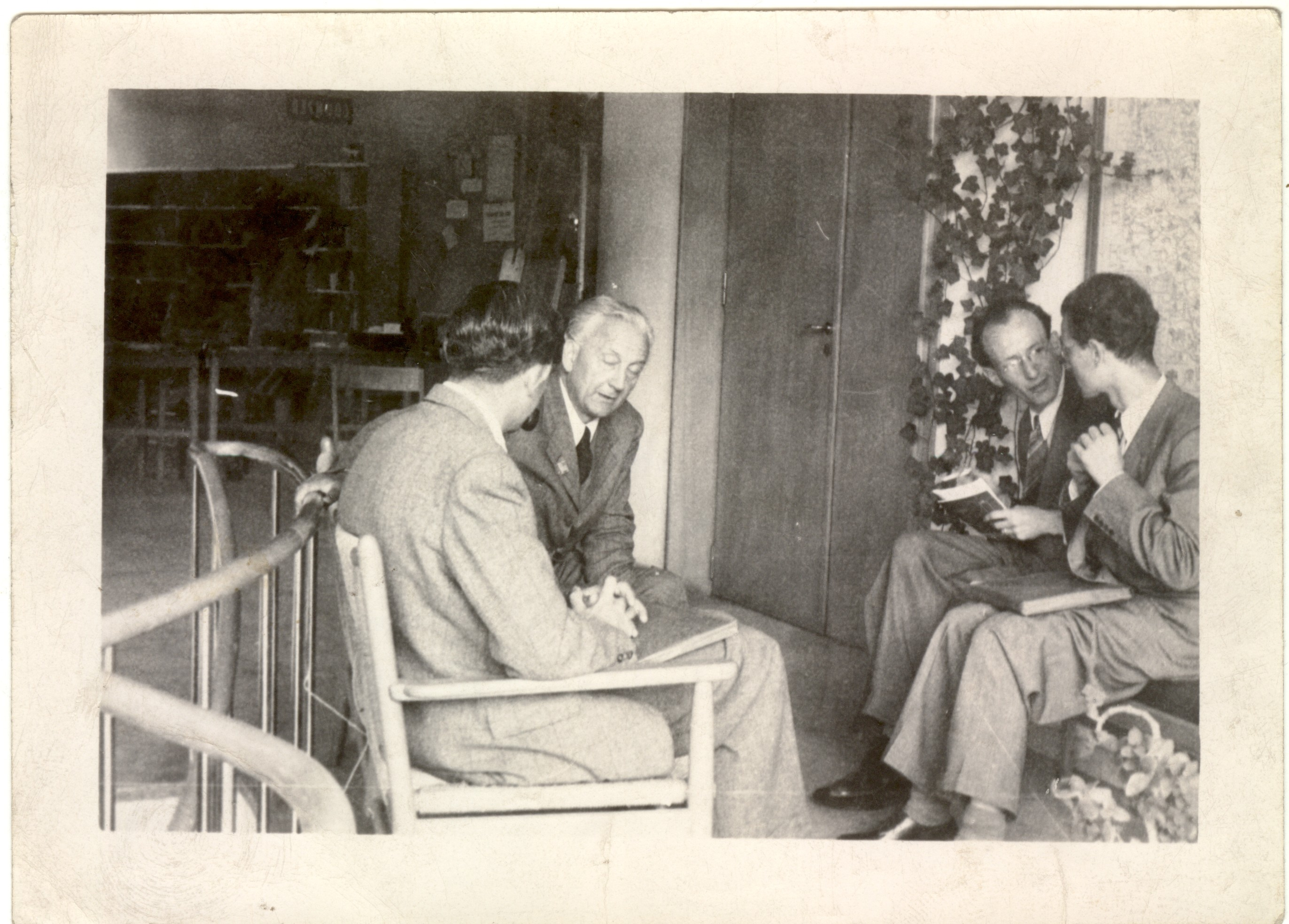
W.F.H.M. Mommaerts and Albert Szent-Györgyi on the left, Endre Bíró and Tamás Erdős on the right, Stockholm, 1947, the Sixth International Congress of Experimental Cytology

== Scientific career ==
Bíró started his scientific career at the Biochemistry Institute of the Pázmány Péter University of Budapest in 1945, an institute that Albert Szent-Györgyi founded in the same year.

"It was Albert Szent-Györgyi who founded the first Hungarian school of biochemistry, the activities of which have been world famous since then. Among the researchers of the institute, we can name, among others, Ilona Banga, Endre Bíró, Tamás Erdős. Mihály Gerendás, János Gergely, Ferenc Guba, Kálmán Laki and Brunó Ferenc Straub."

Remembering these times, one of Bíró's colleagues writes as follows: "I started my career as a fresh university graduate at the Medical Chemistry Institute in 1950. Mátyas Rákosi, who was officially referred to as the «best disciple of Stalin», had already instituted a reign of terror in the country, and the waves of the terror started to reach the Hungarian Academy of Sciences as well as the universities, including the Medical Chemistry Institute, at this time. Endre Bíró hardly survived the shameful times of 1944, and now he had to face another crisis. Colleagues who had a similar career benefited a great deal from the «new order» and thus became willy-nilly the tools of terror. Endre Bíró stayed aloof from this «solution». (...) Endre Bíró led an exemplary life. He respected science very much indeed, and he never treated it as a means for his career. Due to his modesty, he was pushed to the background in an unfair way.... A professor heading an institute does not always have time for the junior research assistants. However, Zebi (as Endre Bíró was nicknamed for short) was always available when needed. We had a maxim: «Don't worry, Zebi will explain it!» "

Albert Szent-Györgyi and his team, including Bíró, attended the 6th International Congress of Experimental Cytology lasting from July 10 till July 17, 1947 in Stockholm. Dissatisfied with the Communist rule of Hungary, most members of Albert Szent-Györgyi's team emigrated to the West. (Bíró met Szent-Györgyi the next time twenty-five years later in 1972 in America, in Cold Spring Harbor.)

Bíró got a Ph.D. degree in biological sciences in 1955, and an advanced doctorate degree of biological sciences in 1967.

In 1950 the Communist regime changed the name of Pázmány Péter University into Eötvös Loránd University and, a year later, made the medical faculty of the University into an independent medical school Semmelweis University.

In 1953 Bíró was invited to head the Animal Biochemistry Department of the Faculty of Natural Sciences of Eötvös Loránd University. However, as instructed by the Ministry of Culture, after a few years the department ended its activities, and within the Department of Genetics, a small Biochemistry Research Unit was set up. In the beginnings, this research unit had only two full-time employees – Bíró and the recently graduated Béla Nagy. After Béla Nagy had gone to the United States, András Mühlrad became the second member of the research unit.

Remembering these times, András Mühlrad points out: "I have never known a researcher who was so much exempt from vanity or narrow-minded personal ambition. Bíró was always ready to help his students and colleagues with good advice. His broad knowledge transcended biochemistry and included also the social sciences. His contact with people was characterized by the fact that he naively always assumed the best of all the people he came into contact with. Therefore, he hardly had any enemies. This is something rare in science where so much moral frailty can be observed even amongst the best researchers."

"From 1962 on, the research unit employed new staff (Gabriella Kelemen, Miklós Bálint and György Hegyi). Back then this research group was poorly equipped, but this was largely offset thanks to the ingenuity of Bíró. Based on his patented invention, the Hungarian Optical Works started to produce the first Hungarian photometer, called UVIFOT, which could operate also in the ultraviolet range.

In 1968 the Biochemistry Research Unit became independent of the Department of Genetics and moved into spacious premises, located on the ground-floor and the basement of a university building under 3 Pushkin Street. The long-awaited event was enthusiastically celebrated by both the staff members and the students."

In 1968 Bíró became a university professor and the head of the newly established Department of Biochemistry. In addition to extensive teaching activities, the Department of Biochemistry at Eötvös Loránd University did research into the biochemistry of proteins and the biology of muscle contraction. The Department had internationally recognized results in the study of the structure of myosin.

The activities of the Biochemistry Research Group and then of the Department of Biochemistry were centered on Bíró's research topics. Bíró published one of his most outstanding research findings together with András Szent-Györgyi jun., the cousin of Albert Szent-Györgyi. They pointed out that the activity of myosin Mg-ATP can be boosted with actin. Even by today's strict standards, the school of Bíró had an outstanding achievement and contributed a great deal to the good reputation of Hungarian biochemistry.

Bíró's interests were not limited to the natural sciences. He was a member of the circle of artists, scientists and scholars that emerged around philosopher, Lajos Szabó. Lajos Szabó, an intellectual guru had some new disciples from each generation. Bíró got acquainted with him through his brother, Gábor Bíró who was by seven years his senior. The circle of Lajos Szabó was by no means an organization with formalized rules. This was a company of friends and an open school with a multi-disciplinary approach. Between 1947 and 1950 Bíró attended the lectures delivered by Lajos Szabó. These lecture seminars were sometimes also attended by the essayist Béla Hamvas and the philosopher Béla Tábor.

He translated extensive excerpts from James Joyce's Finnegans Wake and wrote a detailed study on this work of fiction. Due to the Communist oppression of culture, these translations and the accompanying essay could not be published in Hungary.

They were first published in 1964 in Yugoslavia in the Hungarian literary monthly Híd (Bridge). (This magazine for ethnic Hungarians living in Yugoslavia was open to the pursuits of the avant-garde.) A Paris-based important literary magazine founded by Hungarian intellectuals who fled Hungary in 1956, Magyar Műhely (Hungarian Workshop) published the translation along with the essay on Finnegans Wake. This translation had a significant impact on post-modern Hungarian prose.

== Selected works ==
- Endre Bíró: Nitro- és dimethylglyoxim-kobalti komplexek fényelnyelése (The Light Absorption of Nitro and Cobalt Dimethylglyoxime Complexes), Ph.D. dissertation, Szeged, 1942
- N. A. Biro and A. Szent-Györgyi Jun.: "Observations on the Oxidation of Succinic Acid" Hungarica Acta Physiologica (1946) pp. 9–15
- N. A. Biro, and A. Szent-Györgyi Jun.:"Influence of KCI and ATP on the Succinodehydrogenase and Cytochrom-Oxydase" Hungarica Acta Physiologica (1948) pp. 211–214.
- N. A. Biro and A. Szent-Györgyi Jun.: "Observations on Washed Muscle." Hungarica Acta Physiologica (1948) pp. 215–217
- N. A. Bíró and A. E. Szent-Györgyi: "The Effect of Actin and Physico-Chemical Changes on the Myosin ATP-ase System and on Washed Muscle" Hungarica Acta Physiologica (1949) pp. 120–133
- Az izomfehérjék biokémiája a mechanokémiai kapcsolat szempontjából (The Biochemistry of Muscle Proteins in Terms of the Mechanochemical Connection), Ph.D. dissertation, Budapest, 1955
- Nagymolekulasúlyú telítetlen zsírsavak nagyvákuumban való viselkedésének vizsgálata (The Examination of High-Molecular-Weight Unsaturated Fatty Acids in High Vacuum), advanced Ph.D. dissertation, Budapest, 1967
- Symposium on the Muscle, edited by N. A. Bíró and N. Garamvölgyi, Budapest, Akadémiai Kiadó, 1974
- Proceedings of the 9th Meeting of the Federation of European Biochemical Societies (Proteins of Contractile Systems), edited by György Gárdos and N. A. Bíró, Amsterdam, North-Holland-American Elsevier, Budapest, Akadémiai Kiadó, 1975

== Selected textbooks ==
- Endre Bíró: A gyógyszeripar (The Pharmaceutical Industry), Budapest, Országos Neveléstudományi Intézet, 1949
- Endre Bíró: A modern biokémia alapkérdései (The Basic Issues of Modern Biochemistry), Budapest, Gondolat, 1962
- Endre Bíró: Biokémia (Biochemistry), Budapest, Tankönyvkiadó, 1972, a textbook for university students, second, revised edition
- Endre Bíró (ed.): Biokémia (Biochemistry) / authors: Gabriella Kelemen [et al.], Budapest, Tankönyvkiadó, 1983, in two volumes, pp. 882
- Endre Bíró (ed.): Biokémiai gyakorlatok (Practical Biochemistry) / authors: Gabriella Kelemen [et al.], Budapest, Tankönyvkiadó, 1983, textbook for Hungarian university students, fifth, unchanged republication

== Selected translations ==
- "Szemelvények a "Finnegans Wake"-ből" (Extracts from Finnegans Wake), (Translated and introduced by Endre Bíró), Híd (Bridge), November 1964, pp. 1241–1256
- "Szemelvények a "Finnegans Wake"-ből" (Extracts from Finnegans Wake), (Translated and introduced by Endre Bíró), Magyar Műhely (Hungarian Workshop), Paris, September 1973. pp. 9–59 and June 1979, pp. 22–29
- James Joyce: Finnegan ébredése: részletek (Excerpts from Finnegans Wake), (Translated and introduced by Endre Bíró), Budapest, Holnap Kiadó, 1992 and 1994

== Literature ==
- "In memoriam Bíró Endre professzor" (In Memory of Professor Endre Bíró) Biokémia (Quarterly Review of the Hungarian Biochemical Society), March 1989, The authors are colleagues and former colleagues: Miklós Bálint, László Gráf, Mihály Bárány, Ágnes Jancsó, András Mühlrad, Ferenc Fábián and Dezsó Prágay, as well as rabbi István Berger, pp. 21–36 (http://www.mbkegy.hu/apps/mbkegy/pages/index.php )
- Biography of Endre Bíró on the website of the Department of Biochemistry of Eötvös Loránd University Bíró Endre (1919–1988)
- The History of the Department of Biochemistry Bhttp://biokemia.elte.hu/tortenet/a_tanszek_tortenete
- Ágnes Jancsó - László Nyitrayː "Following Albert Szent-Györgyi's Footsteps in Budapest" Inː Muscle Contraction—A Hungarian Perspective, Semmelweis Publisher, Budapest, 2018, pp. 55–64.
