= Andrea Caffi =

Italian philosopher and libertarian socialist (1887–1955)

- Born: May 1, 1887; Saint Petersburg, Russian Empire
- Died: July 22, 1955 (aged 68); Paris, France
- Resting place: Père Lachaise Cemetery, Paris
- Occupations: Philosopher, political theorist, journalist
- Known for: Critique of violence; libertarian socialism; theory of sociability

Andrea Caffi (1 May 1887 – 22 July 1955) was an Italian philosopher, political theorist, journalist, and anti-fascist activist whose nomadic life spanned the Russian Empire, revolutionary Russia, Fascist Italy, and France under Nazi occupation. A libertarian socialist, he developed an original and influential critique of political violence and the modern state, arguing that genuine human emancipation depended not on organised force but on the cultivation of spontaneous social bonds, which he called "sociability." Although he published largely in obscurity and under pseudonyms, his writing deeply influenced the New York intellectual left of the 1940s, particularly through the journal politics and its editor Dwight Macdonald. His work was posthumously collected in English as A Critique of Violence (1970).

== Early life and education ==
Caffi was born on 1 May 1887 in Saint Petersburg, then the capital of the Russian Empire, into an Italian family. His father, Giovanni Caffi, had emigrated from Belluno in northeast Italy to work as a costume designer at the Imperial Theatres. His mother, Emilia Carlini, is believed by biographers to have been born in France to Italian emigrants. Growing up in Saint Petersburg, Caffi attended the city's International School, where he was already drawn to socialist ideas and began acquainting himself with the conditions of workers and peasants in Tsarist Russia.

He subsequently studied in Berlin, where he undertook university courses in philosophy, before moving first to Florence and then to Paris. His formative years brought him into contact with the European artistic and intellectual avant-garde in Paris in the period immediately before the First World War.

== Russia and the revolutionary years ==
When the First World War broke out, Caffi volunteered first in the French army and subsequently served in the Italian army, where he was wounded twice, the second time on the Dolomite front near the region of his father's birth. He was eventually assigned to communications and propaganda work.

After the war, Caffi returned to Russia, where he collaborated with fellow libertarian socialists who shared his critique of the authoritarian and violent methods of the Bolshevik regime. This critical political activity led to his arrest; having already been detained under the Tsarist Okhrana, he now experienced imprisonment under the Leninist Cheka as well. After his release he remained in Moscow for a period before returning to Italy in 1923.

== Italy, exile, and anti-fascism ==
Back in Italy, Caffi contributed to journals in the socialist sphere and engaged with the Italian intellectual world, forming friendships with figures including Alberto Moravia and Giuseppe Ungaretti. As early as 1924 he was analysing the nature of Fascism: in "Cronaca di dieci giornate," published in the journal Volontà, he traced Mussolini's success to the despair and disorientation that the war had generated among the masses, particularly among déclassé veterans who had embraced the regime's crude demagogy.

The consolidation of the Fascist dictatorship forced Caffi to flee Italy in 1926. He settled in France, initially at Versailles and then Paris, where he earned a modest living as a translator and editor for publishing houses. In Paris he deepened his involvement with Italian anti-fascism in exile, in particular the movement Giustizia e Libertà (Justice and Liberty), led by Carlo Rosselli. Although he participated in internal debates within the movement and contributed essays to its journal Quaderni di Giustizia e Libertà, he quickly came into conflict with its political practice, insisting that anti-fascism could not rely on political violence and had to work at the deeper level of moral and social transformation.

It was in Paris in May 1932 that Caffi met the Italian writer and activist Nicola Chiaromonte, introduced by Moravia. This friendship would prove decisive for Caffi's later reach and influence. The two maintained a correspondence that continued until Caffi's death, portions of which have been published as Cosa sperare? Il carteggio tra Andrea Caffi e Nicola Chiaromonte (2012).

== Toulouse and the Second World War ==
When Germany invaded France in June 1940, Caffi was among a group that fled Paris together, including Chiaromonte, Mario Levi (brother of the writer Natalia Ginzburg), and the future historian of Russian Populism, Franco Venturi. The group made for Toulouse, in the unoccupied zone. Chiaromonte left Toulouse for New York in March 1941; Caffi remained behind, living in considerable poverty throughout the occupation years. During this period he was arrested by the Gestapo and the French Milice for his continued involvement in resistance activities.

While in Toulouse, Caffi resumed correspondence with Chiaromonte in January 1945. Much of the intellectual material that would that would be published in different venues in New York was first developed in letters to Chiaromonte and Dwight Macdonald. Though Caffi never visited New York, between 1945 and 1948 his work appeared in three New York avant-garde journals — politics, possibilities, and Instead — as well as in Macdonald's 1953 book The Root is Man. His entrée into this circle was facilitated entirely by Chiaromonte, who had become Macdonald's closest friend and intellectual advisor in New York and acted as a talent scout for the politics circle.

== Paris and death ==
Caffi left Toulouse for Paris in early 1949 and lived there until his death. He resided at the Hôtel de l'Académie on the rue des Saints-Pères in Saint-Germain-des-Prés. One of his neighbours for a period was the American novelist Saul Bellow; it has been suggested that Caffi may have been a model for the character of Mr. Sammler in Bellow's novel Mr. Sammler's Planet. During his Paris years Caffi worked as a reader for the prestigious French publisher Gallimard; Franco Venturi, who had been part of the group that fled Paris with Caffi in 1940, later paid tribute to his work there in the revised introduction to Roots of Revolution (1972).

Andrea Caffi died on 22 July 1955. He was cremated, and his ashes are held in the Columbarium of the Père Lachaise Cemetery in Paris.

== Political thought ==
=== Critique of violence ===
The centre of Caffi's political philosophy was a principled critique of political violence in all its forms. His core argument, set out most fully in "Violence and Sociability" (1947), was that a movement aiming to achieve "bread, liberty, peace" — the abolition of wage labour, the coercive state, and national rivalries — could not consistently employ organised violence: armed insurrection, civil war, international war, or dictatorial terror. To resort to such methods, Caffi argued, was to reproduce the very structures of oppression one sought to overcome. He traced this through the histories of the French Revolution (where Robespierre and Saint-Just had centralised and militarised France, preparing the ground for Napoleonic despotism) and the Russian Revolution (where Lenin and Trotsky had crushed the soviets and established the apparatus that made Stalinist autocracy possible).

=== Sociability and "society" ===
At the heart of Caffi's alternative vision was the concept of "sociability", by which he meant the web of spontaneous, voluntary, pleasurable human relations conducted in at least the appearance of freedom and without coercion. He defined "society" as the ensemble of such relations, characterised by the rejection in principle of constraint and especially of violence. For Caffi, the strength of any emancipatory movement could be directly measured by the depth and vitality of its social life.

The subject capable of driving genuine social transformation was, for Caffi, a cultivated elite of small, informal groups of dissenters and friends animated by shared values, acting not through propaganda machines or collective mobilisation but through individual initiative, example, and what he described as a kind of cultural contagion. He pointed to the early Christians, the Encyclopédistes, and the libertine circles of the eighteenth century as historical models.

=== Fascism and mass politics ===
Caffi's analysis of Fascism traced its origins to the despair and disorientation produced by the First World War. Mussolini's success depended, he argued, on the political weight of proletarianised war veterans with nothing to lose, susceptible to the crudest demagogy. Fascism was thus not a sudden aberration but the symptom of a deep crisis of European civilisation — one that could not be defeated by a mere political overturning but only by patient moral and social reconstruction from the ground up.

== Legacy and reception ==
During his lifetime, Caffi was a little-known and often impoverished figure. His influence was primarily personal and epistolary. In the judgment of Gregory Sumner, Caffi's ideas, along with those of Macdonald and their fellow contributors to politics, anticipated tendencies that would gain wide acceptance in the decades after the Second World War, including the strategies of Martin Luther King Jr. and the American civil rights movement, Václav Havel's dissident anti-communism, and the nonviolent opposition of Hungarian writers such as György Konrád.

A posthumous English-language collection, A Critique of Violence, was published by Bobbs-Merrill in 1970, with an introduction by Nicola Chiaromonte. Lionel Abel's essay "What Is Society? The Ideas of Andrea Caffi," published in Commentary in September 1970, provided the first substantial assessment of Caffi's thought for an English-language audience.

Since the 1990s there has been a substantial Italian scholarly rediscovery of Caffi. Marco Bresciani's biography, La rivoluzione perduta: Andrea Caffi nell'Europa del Novecento (2009), remains the most comprehensive account of his life and thought. His manuscript on fascist doctrine, La dottrina fascista, was published for the first time in a critical edition edited by Alberto Castelli in 2022. The essays that he published between 1945 and 1948 in New York were collected and edited by Mike Tyldesley, with an afterword by Castelli, and published as Andrea Caffi: The New York Essays (2026) by Little Big Eye Publishing.

== Selected works ==
=== Published in his lifetime ===
- "The Automatization of European People" (as "European"), politics, No. 10, November 1945
- "Towards a Socialist Program" (as "European"), politics, No. 12, December 1945
- "Is a Revolutionary War a Contradiction in Terms?" (as "European"), politics, No. 27, April 1946
- "Notes on Mass Culture" (as "European"), politics, No. 33, November 1946
- "Violence and Sociability" (as "European"), politics, No. 36, January 1947
- "The French Condition" (as "European"), politics, No. 38, July/August 1947
- "On Mythology," possibilities, No. 1, Winter 1947/48
- "A Glance at Marx's Horizons," Instead, No. 1, early 1948
- "Machine and Myth," Instead, No. 3, possibly March 1948
- "The Myth and Politics" (with Nicola Chiaromonte), Instead, No. 7, late 1948/early 1949
- "In Today's Newspaper," Instead, No. 7, late 1948/early 1949
- "Mass Politics and the Pax Americana," in Dwight Macdonald, The Root is Man, Alhambra (CA): The Cunningham Press, 1953

=== Posthumous collections ===
- A Critique of Violence, Indianapolis: Bobbs-Merrill, 1970 (ed. Nicola Chiaromonte)
- Scritti politici, Florence: La Nuova Italia, 1970
- La dottrina fascista, o il fascismo nella storia superiore del pensiero, Milan: Biblion, 2022 (ed. Alberto Castelli)
- The New York Essays, Charlotte: Little Big Eye Publishing, 2026, (ed. Mike Tyldesley, afterword by Alberto Castelli)
