= The Oasis (novel) =

1949 novel by Mary McCarthy

- First edition
- Author: Mary McCarthy
- Language: English
- Genre: Conte Philosophique, Roman à Clef
- Publisher: Random House
- Publication date: 1949
- Publication place: United States
- Pages: 181
- ISBN: 9781612192284
- Preceded by: The Company She Keeps
- Followed by: The Groves of Academe

The Oasis is a short satirical novel by the American writer Mary McCarthy, published by Random House in 1949. McCarthy describes this, her second novel, as a "conte philosophique". It tells the story of a group of embattled intellectuals, their quest to establish a Utopian community in the mountains of New England, and their failure to surmount ideological and personal differences for the greater good of the commune. Doubling as a roman à clef, The Oasis borrows heavily from McCarthy's experiences and frustrations with the short lived European-American Group, and serves more broadly as a critique of the “abstract idealism of intellectuals” and their inability to enact actual change.

== Plot ==
Set in the near future following 1949, The Oasis depicts a group of 50 radical and liberal intellectuals who venture into the mountains of New England to create a shared living commune (aptly named, “Utopia”). Already present in Utopia's formation, however, is a deep ideological schism between two rival factions: the cynical Realists and the self-righteous Purists. The Realists, led by the embittered former Marxist William Taub, anticipate the experiment will end in little more than a summer vacation and await Utopia's eventual demise, while the Purists, led by the magazine editor Macdougal Macdermott, are hesitant to perform any action that could contradict their radical, libertarian beliefs.

The first challenge presented to both factions is whether or not they will admit into Utopia the Lockman family, led by the exuberant blue-blood Joe Lockman. Macdermott, who regards Lockman as a “philistine,” eventually grants the Lockmans his approval for fear that he might otherwise appear elitist. The acceptance of the Lockmans, however, calls forth the larger question, “Was it to follow that anyone could be admitted to Utopia?”

By the end of the first night in Utopia, it is the Realist leader Taub, not Macdermott, who finds Lockman to be a nuisance; Taub is put on edge by Lockman's bombastic spirit and hunting shotgun. The next morning, Katy Norell, one of Utopia's more vocal Purists, burns herself and ruins the commune's breakfast while cooking. Most likely an honest mishap, the incident is quickly politicized and blamed on Lockman by the Realists. Following the mishap, Katy's husband, Preston, publicly scolds Katy for ruining breakfast, demonstrating the immense strain that communal living has taken on the Utopia's residents.

That night, the Realists convene a communal meeting, conspiring to exile Joe and assert their dominance over the Purists. When they are given the floor, however, Taub and his followers are unable to articulate what it is they want or on what grounds they wish to expel Joe. The meeting ends with the Purists laughing at Taub. Macdermott dismisses the Realists as “revolutionary nihilists,” explaining, “They don’t know what they want… They’re so conservative they’re afraid of their own thoughts.”

After a short “lyrical period” of peace, prosperity, and basking in the pastoral quaintness of the commune, the Utopians begin to question the purpose of their project, and whether or not their mission serves a greater good. Katy Norell laments not living up to the expectations of Monteverdi, the ideological “Founder” of the commune and champion of the Purists’ beliefs. They consider creating a “United States of Europe in Exile,” a mission to bring refugees displaced by World War II to America in order to create more small-scale communities like their own. However, the plan falls apart almost as quickly as it is proposed. Grand ambitions to contact congressmen, trade unionists, and newspapers dissolve into an effort to make a simple pamphlet, but this idea is also abandoned.

One day, the Taubs, Katy, and other members of the commune go strawberry picking on the outskirts of Utopia, only to find that a group of locals has beaten them to the site. When the Utopians ask the locals to leave some berries for them, the Utopians are rudely dismissed. Seeing their dismay, Joe Lockman fires blanks from his gun in order to ward the intruding locals away from Utopia. Lockman then insists everyone in Utopia padlock their front doors, prompting a commune-wide philosophical debate on the implications of privatizing property in Utopia. The discussion prompted by the intruders’ arrival grows increasingly broad, with Katy and Taub disagreeing about whether or not Utopia can survive such a shake up. Katy, drunk, ends up lying in the grass in order to take in the pastoral setting, while Jim Haines, a “Lincoln-esque” magazine editor who is revered by all Utopians, begins to pack up his car to leave the commune, confirming Katy's worst suspicions that, “Ultimately, Utopia would fail.”

== Characters ==
William Taub- Based on Philip Rahv, McCarthy's ex-lover and editor at The Partisan Review, Taub is the leader of the Realist faction of Utopia. As the victim of the book's most “outrageous satire,” Taub is depicted as cowardly, lazy, self-centered, and villainous, amounting to a “not especially flattering depiction” of the jaded anti-Stalinist. Convinced that the “potency of history” will prove the “failure of socialism,” Taub is fixated on seeing Utopia fail.

Macdougal Macdermott- Serving as a stand-in for Dwight Macdonald (a friend of McCarthy's and the founder of the magazine politics), Macdermott is the leader of the Purist faction. Though Macdonald is not lampooned to the same degree that Rahv is, the character of Macdermott is hot-tempered, blindly committed to being consistent in his libertarian views, and susceptible to being roped into Taub's political chess match.

Joe Lockman- A “capitalist monad” who “sets the purists’ symbolic tests,” Joe’s impulsive nature pushes the ideological imperatives of both the Realists and the Purists to their limits.

Katy Norell- A libertarian idealist dedicated to the purist faction and stuck in a fractious marriage, Katy resembles McCarthy in 1949 more closely than any other character in The Oasis. Katy provides the book’s strongest feminine perspective and feminist argument, “reveal[ing] much remains to be learned about women’s rights in [Utopia].” Large sections of The Oasis hold little narrative distance from Katy, as the reader sees the mission of the commune fall apart through Katy's eyes towards the end of the novel.

Jim Haines- A handsome magazine editor whose departure from Utopia portends the beginning of the end of Utopia.

Susan Hapgood- A novelist and follower of the Realist faction who dotes on Taub, Susan is perhaps meant to represent the younger McCarthy, or perhaps Elizabeth Hardwick, McCarthy's friend and fellow novelist.

Harold Sidney- Based on William Phillips, a co-editor of The Partisan Review with Philip Rahv, Sidney is Taub's second-in-command. Though less capricious than Taub, he is equally conniving, and, when the time comes for him to speak out against Lockman, Macdermott, and the Purists, he is also equally inept.

Leo Raphael- Inspired by discussion of the commune's greater purpose, Leo proposes that the Utopians refocus their energies on a United States of Europe in Exile, in which the commune can act as a model for European refugees who wish to escape the threat of communism and settle in America.

Monteverdi, “the Founder”- Based on Nicola Chiaromonte. While he does not make any actual appearance in Utopia, the Founder is seen as a sort of prophet by the Purists, his absence leaving them directionless.

== Publishing history ==
The Oasis was originally published as an ongoing series under the name A Source of Embarrassment by the British literary magazine Horizon. It was published by Random House in 1949. Though its initial circulation was limited, the novel was reissued by Melville House in 2013 as part of its “Neversink Library” series.

== Historical background ==
Following the bombing of Hiroshima in the summer of 1945, which McCarthy referred to as a “watershed, a dividing line,” many of the New York Intellectuals—a group, which included McCarthy, of contributors to politics, Partisan Review, and other preeminent New York writers and thinkers—became alarmed by the rapidly escalating nuclear arms race between the United States and the Soviet Union. As many of the New York Intellectuals were formerly avowed Trotskyist Communists, the group became attracted to the idea of retreating from society at large and participating in small-scale communal living. Concerning the period immediately following the war, McCarthy would later remark: “It seemed possible still, utopian but possible, to change the world on a small scale.”

That summer, McCarthy and her fellow New York Intellectuals, under the guidance of activist Nicola Chiaromonte, established the European-American Group (EAG) in an effort to create “human-scaled, grassroots, transnational communities of dialogue and solidarity.” This effort towards small-scale living, however, was short lived. Soon after its founding, the EAG disbanded “due to a lack of internal consensus about its goals,” as “the Macdonald-McCarthy-Chiaromonte faction” failed to find common ground with the so-called “Partisan Review Boys,” Philip Rahv and William Phillips. As Hugh Wilford contends in his historio-literary analysis of The Oasis, “An Oasis: The New York Intellectuals in the Late 1940s,” the dissolution of the EAG marked the beginning of the cooptation of Old Left holdouts such as McCarthy and her contemporaries into a larger liberal, post-World War II consensus. In fact, many members of the EAG would become key figures in the creation of the Congress for Cultural Freedom (CCF), a front organization designed by the Central Intelligence Agency for the purposes of winning the Cultural Cold War. Only a few years later, in the spring of 1949, McCarthy—along with Dwight Mcdonald, Elizabeth Hardwick, Sidney Hook, and other former EAG members—would help disrupt a communist conference held at the Waldorf-Astoria Hotel. Foreseeing this eventual shift, McCarthy spent her final days in the EAG documenting the group's failures through her writing of The Oasis.

== Analysis ==
The Oasis has been described as “an imaginative inquiry into the causes of radical failure,” a satirical critique of the limitations of intellectual debate and the ability for intellectuals to enact actual change, as well as a condemnation of communal and political organization in general. For the latter reason, much has been written on the relationship between The Oasis and the philosophy of McCarthy's longtime friend, historian Hannah Arendt. In “Social Utopia: Hannah Arendt and Mary McCarthy’s The Oasis,” Nicholas Spencer argues that both Arendt and McCarthy are wary of the propensity of political groups towards “altruistic fervor” and injecting their “personal conduct” with “general objectivity”. Since neither believes that the convictions of political groups can withstand social and personal pressure enacted by the individuals that compose these groups, both favor a “solitude over solidarity” model. Both Arendt and McCarthy view the role of the group as “anesthetic,” and believe that an individual's “yielding” to facts in the service of “self-alteration” is a superior method of self-improvement than group organizing. This ideology is mirrored by and made manifest in McCarthy's unremitting prose, most evidently in The Oasis.

== Critical response ==
Reception of The Oasis has been historically mixed. Response to the novel's earliest incarnation, in Horizon magazine, was generally positive. American critics, however, were less kind. In a tepid review published by The New York Times, critic Donald Barr wrote, “readers outside [McCarthy’s] circle can get little from The Oasis except a vague sense of defamatory brilliance and a few fine scenes.”

Though Hannah Arendt looked favorably on The Oasis, calling it “a gem,” many of McCarthy's closest friends were offended by the novel, most notably those who were implicated in the book's plot. Dwight Macdonald called the book “vicious, malicious, and nasty,” while Diana Trilling labeled McCarthy “a thug.” Saul Bellow found Rahv's portrayal to be a “stupid caricature,” with Rahv himself threatening to sue McCarthy for libel.

The Oasis has experienced something of a resurgence in recent years. Melville House reissued the book in 2013 as part of its Neversink Library series, which “champions books from around the world that have been overlooked, under appreciated, looked askance at, or foolishly ignored.” Additionally, the book has experienced an upswing in scholarly interest over the past thirty years. In her preface to the 2013 edition of The Oasis, Vivian Gornick wrote:

“many American critics… pronounced [The Oasis] brilliant but heartless. They were wrong. The book is not heartless. It is not out for blood. True, irony inevitably means some fundamental sympathy is being withheld, but the irony here is not savage. Its deliciously witty sentence structure is rooted in the heartfelt disappointment of a moralist whom the reader feels has really wanted the good (that is, the genuine) in our midst to prevail.”

== Works cited ==
- Arendt, Hannah, Mary McCarthy, and Carol Brightman. Between Friends: The Correspondence of Hannah Arendt and Mary McCarthy, 1949-1975. New York: Harcourt Brace, 1996. Print.
- Barr, Donald. “Failure in Utopia.” Rev. of The Oasis. The New York Times [New York, New York] 14 Aug. 1949: n. pag. The New York Times. The New York Times. Web. 19 May 2017. <http://www.nytimes.com/books/00/03/26/specials/mccarthy-oasis.html>.
- Fuchs-Abrams, Sabrina. “The Liberal Cauldron: Satire of the Postwar Intellectual.” Mary McCarthy: Gender, Politics, and the Postwar Intellectual. New York: P. Lang, 2004. 54-62. Print.
- Gornick, Vivian. “The Company They Kept.” Editorial. New Yorker 13 June 2013: n. pag. The New Yorker. The New Yorker, 3 May 2017. Web. 19 May 2017. <http://www.newyorker.com/books/page-turner/the-company-they-kept>.
- Grumbach, Doris. The Company She Kept: Mary McCarthy, Herself and Her Writings. London: Bodley Head, 1967. 129-50. Print.
- McCarthy, Mary. The Oasis. Brooklyn, NY: Melville House, 2013. Print.
- Melville House Books. N.p., n.d. Web. 19 May 2017. <https://www.mhpbooks.com/books/oasis/>.
- Melville House Books. N.p., n.d. Web. 19 May 2017. <https://www.mhpbooks.com/series/the-neversink-library/>.
- Nelson, D. “The Virtues of Heartlessness: Mary McCarthy, Hannah Arendt, and the Anesthetics of Empathy.” American Literary History 18.1 (2006): 86-101. Web.
- Spencer, Nicholas. “Social Utopia: Hannah Arendt and Mary McCarthy’s The Oasis.” Lit: Literature Interpretation Theory 15.1 (2004): 45-60. Web.
- Sumner, George. “Nicola Chiaromonte, the Politics Circle, and the Search for a Postwar "Third Camp.” Twenty-Four Ways of Looking at Mary McCarthy: The Writer and Her Work. By Margo Viscusi. Westport, CT: Greenwood, 1996. 55-60. Print.
- Teres, Harvey. “Reimagining Politics.” Twenty-Four Ways of Looking at Mary McCarthy: The Writer and Her Work. By Margo Viscusi. Westport, CT: Greenwood, 1996. 61-67. Print.
- Wilford, Hugh. “An Oasis: The New York Intellectuals in the Late 1940s.” Journal of American Studies 28.02 (1994): 209-23. Web.
