= The Company She Keeps (novel) =

Novel by Mary McCarthy

- Author: Mary McCarthy
- Language: English
- Publisher: Simon & Schuster
- Publication date: 1942
- Publication place: United States
- Pages: 304
- OCLC: 2215544

The Company She Keeps is the debut and a semi-autobiographical novel by American writer Mary McCarthy, published in 1942 by Simon & Schuster.

It is an unconventional work, tracing the journey of a highly politicized young Catholic college graduate through various stages of emotional development, in unusually frank and revealing detail. The story blends many themes that had marked the author's own life, such as patriarchy, feminism, rebellion and betrayal, as expressed in her later autobiography, Memories of a Catholic Girlhood (1957). The six episodes do not follow directly in sequence, and some had already been published as magazine fiction. Critics noted that some of the characters are easily recognizable portraits from the contemporary New York literary scene.

== Background ==
=== Autobiographical elements ===
Margaret Sargent, protagonist of The Company She Keeps, closely resembles McCarthy's account of herself in her later autobiography Memories of a Catholic Girlhood (1957). But this was not obvious for more than a decade after this novel was published.

Many of the circumstances of Margaret's, or Meg's, life mirror McCarthy's own young adulthood: A college graduate living in New York City; a young first marriage that ends in divorce; works for a publisher, reading manuscripts, and writes for a liberal magazine. Because McCarthy travelled in prestigious literary circles, her characters have been traced as thinly veiled accounts of well-known intellectuals, such as Edmund Wilson and Philip Rahv.

But, The Company She Keeps is by no means a purely autobiographical work. McCarthy confesses to reimagining or simply inventing episodes, and doesn't always remember which parts of her stories are true and which are fictionalized. McCarthy has stated in interviews that the episode in the chapter "The Man in the Brooks Brothers Shirt" really did happen, though she changed names and cities to retain a degree of anonymity.

=== Prior publication ===
Several of the episodes in The Company She Keeps were originally published as short stories in other sources. "Cruel and Barbarous Treatment," written in 1938 and published in The Southern Review in the spring of 1939, was one of her first works of fiction. McCarthy wrote the other five stories that eventually became The Company She Keeps over the course of the next three and a half years. "The Man in the Brooks Brothers Shirt" was published in Partisan Review in the summer of 1941, "The Genial Host" was published in The Southern Review in the fall of 1941, and "Ghostly Father, I Confess" was published by Harper's Bazaar in April 1942. The other two episodes, "Rogue's Gallery" and "Portrait of the Intellectual as a Yale Man," were published for the first time in The Company She Keeps, in the spring of 1942.

== Form ==
The Company She Keeps consists of six episodes featuring the same heroine, Meg Sargent. But, the stories do not easily cohere into a whole. The narrative voice switches between the second- and third-person, and the heroine's name isn't even mentioned until the second episode, and then only obliquely. McCarthy wrote each story as a stand-alone piece; but the heroine and the underlying themes continue across the different settings and styles. McCarthy said that she began to think of these six stories as one unified story. McCarthy put the stories together to form one collection and was adamant about calling it a novel, but her own formal experimentation intentionally obscures the continuity between episodes.

== Content ==
- "Cruel and Barbarous Treatment". A young, unnamed woman is married, contemplating divorce, and having an affair. She casts her life as a drama between herself and her two lovers – the Husband and the Young Man. She doesn't dislike this play, but finds it riddled with clichés and without depth. After a while, her affair loses some of its excitement, and the protagonist decides that it is no longer enough to be a Woman With A Secret. She reveals the affair and leaves her husband. She decides she won't marry the Young Man and begins to fear a life of spinsterhood until she fully begins to embrace the glamor of being a Young Divorcee. Her husband lets her go, and eventually she tires of the Young Man's tireless devotion. The story ends with no marriage and no affair, but the heroine refuses to fall into self-pity. She moves forward with her life alone.
- "Rogue's Gallery". The heroine, named Margaret, or Meg, Sargent, works at a strange gallery run by a man named Mr. Sheer, whose only profitable items are miniature portraits of dogs set into crystal cufflinks. Mr. Sheer loves Old World luxury items, and keeps his shop filled to the brim with new acquisitions. However, Meg soon finds out that the business is founded on nothing, and that all of the items for sale have been loaned to him on consignment. Sheer lives his life from one flawed deal to another until he eventually vanishes with no forwarding address. Meg runs into him years later; he has achieved success working in someone else's gallery. However, he is deeply unhappy and views Meg as his only true friend.
- "The Man in the Brooks Brothers Shirt". Meg is on a train heading to San Francisco to tell her family about her new fiancée (not the Young Man of the first story) when she meets an older man who is clearly interested in her. Charmed by his manner, Meg enters his club car, gets drunk with him, and is mortified the next morning when she wakes to remember having humiliating sex with him. Yet, she does not leave because the man tells her he has fallen in love with her, and she thinks he would have been better than the New York men she is used to if only he were ten years younger. Meg leaves the man in San Francisco. On her return trip, the man meets her in Cleveland, showering her with expensive gifts – but Meg can tell his interest in her is fading. Eventually, he leaves and never again contacts her.
- "The Genial Host". Meg goes to a party hosted by a dull man named Pflaumen. He is a careful director; his apartment is filled with art intended only for guests to look at, and his parties are equally carefully constructed collections of fascinating people. Pflaumen uses his guests as interesting mouthpieces for his social gatherings; in return, he lets them meet interesting influential people and asks only that they allow him to be a part of their lives. But, Pflaumen's own dullness means that his guests often form connections without him. He tries to insert himself into Meg's life by questioning her about her drinking. Meg dislikes him intensely, especially the way he reduces his guests to a single talking point or view, but is seduced by his lifestyle and his connections.
- "Portrait of the Intellectual as a Yale Man". This episode is told from the perspective of Jim Barnett, a self-satisfied, Yale-educated Socialist. When he meets Meg, he finds her exciting but troubling; however, two months later he begins an affair with her. It fizzles out quickly and the two clash over Meg's Trotskyism and intensity. When Meg gets fired over her views, Jim quietly resigns in protest and intends to write an important Marxist book; however, the story ends with him going to work for a popular conservative magazine that pays well.
- "Ghostly Father, I Confess". In the final story, Meg visits her analyst, Dr. James. All of her fragmented selves are present in this meeting, and Meg, ever the author, wants to impress him. Meg's tyrannical husband has forced her to attend these sessions; Meg wants to divorce him but is unable to do so. Meg and Dr. James search her "child" for answers to her unhappiness; they discuss the death of her mother, her father's sending her to live with her grim Aunt Clara, her mother's Catholicism and her father's Protestantism, and Meg's eventual escape from her aunt. Dr. James believes that her husband serves as a stand-in for both her tyrannical Aunt Clara and her indifferent father. Meg leaves the office and remembers a dream she had about kissing a Nazi. The story ends with a prayer: "If the flesh must be blind, let the spirit see. Preserve me in disunity."

== Literary characteristics ==
While The Company She Keeps is not one of McCarthy's better-known works, it has been well studied. Scholars analyze it according to the following themes:

=== Reality vs. fiction ===
Scholars are fascinated by the autobiographical aspects of The Company She Keeps, and view the novel as a developmental stepping-stone on McCarthy's journey toward discovering her identity as a writer. The stories contained in the novel are not necessarily meant to be chronological, but they are assembled and published as a unit. Readers follow a thread from the first story to the last. McCarthy endows Meg with an author-like literary consciousness, painting her as a director or artist. Readers can approach Meg's fragmentation and search for an integrated self as a reflection of McCarthy's own journey.

=== Catholicism ===
McCarthy's most famous work, the autobiography Memories of a Catholic Girlhood (1957), discussed the role of Catholicism in her upbringing. Because of this, some scholars' interest lies in analyzing McCarthy's other works through the lens of Catholicism. Despite McCarthy's avowed atheism as an adult, her early grounding in Catholicism shaped her writing and life. Her Catholic readership thinks it perceives its continuing influence in her life. A kind of asceticism, and a need for confession and self-understanding permeate her writing. In the earlier novel The Company She Keeps, this is evident in the final episode, as is McCarthy's tendency to write thinly veiled accounts of her personal affairs. McCarthy's first novel was an important 20th-century model of a female, Catholic, coming-of-age story.

Other scholars note that this Catholic influence is specifically an Irish-Catholic influence, and that McCarthy approaches her work with an Irish-American literary sensibility. McCarthy broke out of the style of anti-intellectual, sexist Irish-Catholicism, but still struggled with the Church's sexist and restrictive definition of women, and Irish fatalism. She tends to romanticize suffering and penance. Donohue suggests that McCarthy and many of her heroines, like Meg, are trapped between the intellectual and bohemian life of New York in the 1930s and 1940s, and the restrictive, traditional values and stereotypes of femininity found in the Catholic Church.

=== Feminist theory ===
Some scholars approach The Company She Keeps as an artifact, and examine it in the context of the feminist movements that gained ground during the novel's publication. The novel falls between the first wave of liberal feminism and second wave feminism, and therefore contains elements of each movement: concern with diminished options for women in the workforce and sexual liberation from the first wave, and psychological implications of sexist stereotypes and the repressive character of psychiatry as an institution from the second wave. Feminist literature of the time sought to synthesize Marx and Freud, and rework their sexist doctrines for contemporary feminism. McCarthy's heady intellectualism doesn't shy away from engaging in critique of these two giant figures. Her writing signals the beginning of a pushback against the Old Left by a younger generation of intellectuals, in part by taking a strong stance against Freudian psychiatry by aligning it with patriarchal subordination of female independence for fear that it would lead to madness.

Other theorists analyze The Company She Keeps through more contemporary feminist frameworks, such as Judith Butler's performativity. Butler argues that everyone "performs" identity types in a gendered world. For instance, Meg both depends on and fears typification. One of her defining characteristics is her ability to sort people into types, yet she is terrified of being "typed" by others. Simultaneously, Meg's search for an integrated self throughout the collection of stories is a search for a neat type to fit into. By forcing her protagonist to search for, yet never find, a convenient type for herself, McCarthy uses Meg as a model of resistance against typification.

== Reception ==
The original New York Times review described The Company She Keeps as "strange and provocative" and "a most unusual novel... probably destined to create a minor furor." The critic praises McCarthy for her original and exciting depiction of her heroine and the world in which she moves, but criticizes her for her viciousness, especially in her semi-transparent, often unflattering portrayals of actual literary figures. and says that the novel is as full of contradictions as its main character – that on one hand, it is clever and witty; on the other, it lacks maturity.

Other contemporaries and publications had similar mixed views. Partisan Review originally published "The Man in the Brooks Brothers Shirt", but found the sex scene so controversial and immature that they refused to publish "The Genial Host". McCarthy's husband Edmund Wilson, a prominent writer and critic, found the book ingenious, as did writer Vladimir Nabokov; however, most book reviewers were not as enthusiastic. Many cited McCarthy's immaturity and sharpness, calling the book unlikeable and gossipy. Despite the mixed reception, The Company She Keeps sold 10,000 copies.
