= Neither Victims nor Executioners =

Series of essays by Albert Camus

First English edition (1960)

Neither Victims nor Executioners (French: Ni Victimes, ni bourreaux) was a series of essays by Albert Camus that were serialized in Combat, the daily newspaper of the French Resistance, in November 1946. In the essays he discusses violence and murder and the impact these have on those who perpetrate, suffer, or observe.

Neither Victims nor Executioners is split into eight sections:

- The Century of Fear
- Saving Lives
- The Contradictions of Socialism
- The Betrayed Revolution
- International Democracy and Dictatorship
- The World is Changing Fast
- A New Social Contract
- Toward Dialogue

The essays were translated into English by Dwight Macdonald and published in the July–August 1947 issue of politics. This version is available via England's pacifist Peace Pledge Union. It appeared in separate book form in 1960 with an introduction by Waldo Frank. The essay was also reprinted in the book Between Hell and Reason: Essays from the Resistance Newspaper "Combat".
