= Gregory Sumner =

American academic

Gregory D. Sumner is a professor of History at University of Detroit Mercy and the author of the books Dwight Macdonald and the Politics Circle, Unstuck in Time: A Journey Through Kurt Vonnegut's Life and Novels, and Detroit in World War II.

== Early career ==
Sumner received his Juris Doctor degree in 1980 from the University of Michigan Law School and went on to practice as a corporate attorney at Bingham Summers Welsh & Spilman, Esq. in Indianapolis

== Transition to history ==
Following his interests, Sumner went back to school and received his doctorate in American history from Indiana University in 1992. He became an assistant professor at Grand Valley State University in Grand Rapids for one year before joining the history department at University of Detroit Mercy in 1993.

Sumner is co-chair of the UDM Department of History.

== Awards and fellowships ==
- William J. Fulbright Lecturer at University of Rome III in Rome, Italy (2001 and 2010)
- National Endowment for the Humanities Summer Fellowship at City College of New York (1998)
- National Endowment for the Humanities Summer Fellowship at UCLA (1994)

== Writings ==
=== Books ===
- Michigan WWII POW Camps (History Press, 2018).
- Detroit in World War II (History Press, 2015).
- Welcome to the Monkey House: The Special Edition (Random House, 2014).
- Unstuck in Time: A Journey Through Kurt Vonnegut's Life and Novels (Seven Stories Press, November 11, 2011)
- Dwight Macdonald and the Politics Circle: The Challenge of Cosmopolitan Democracy (Cornell University Press, 1996)

=== Articles ===
- "Vonnegut's Firefighters", thenewinquiry.com (September 11, 2011)
- "Slaughterhouse-Five at Forty", inthesetimes.com (December 23, 2009)
- "Soldiers of Conscience", Peace Review (January–March 2009)
- "Planetary Citizen: Kurt Vonnegut, 1922-2007", New Politics (Winter 2008)
- "The Gentleman from Indianapolis", Indiana Magazine of History (September 2007)
- "No Easy Exit", Una Citta (Forli, November 2006)
- "Miasma of Trouble at the White House", Una Citta (2005)
- "Four More Years: Reflections on the 2004 Election", Una Citta (November 2004)
- "Dwight Macdonald," entry for Dictionary of Modern American Philosophers (2005, Thoemmes Press)
- "Iraq and the Tragic Lessons of Force," Una Citta (October 2003)
- "Notes on the Iraq War" Una Citta (May 2003)
- "Remembering an Expansive Decade", New Politics (Summer 1999)
- "The politics Circle and the Search for a Third Camp," in Twenty Four Ways of Looking at Mary McCarthy (Greenwood Press, 1996)
