= Cannibals and Missionaries =

1979 novel by Mary McCarthy

- First edition
- Author: Mary McCarthy
- Language: English
- Genre: Thriller
- Published: 1979
- Publisher: Weidenfeld & Nicolson
- Publication place: United States
- Media type: Print
- ISBN: 0297777033

Cannibals and Missionaries is a 1979 thriller novel by Mary McCarthy which examines the "psychology of terrorism." The novel focuses on the action created when Dutch/Arab terrorists hijack an Air France plane full of Americans on a flight towards Iran.

== Reception ==
Diane Cole in The Georgia Review had mixed opinions about the novel. She described the novel as a "thriller in which the thrills arise not from the threat of violence or the promise of tawdry sex, but with the pleasure taken in the author's intellect and sense of language." Cole describes the depictions of the captives as more extensive than the terrorists, which leads to a depiction of the terrorists and their tactics as "not convincing".

Kirkus Reviews described the novel in largely negative light, writing that "an odd, slow, rather stiff exercise that nonetheless keeps delivering little rewards (repartee, details, ideas), perhaps enough of them to divert readers with a McCarthy-ish leaning toward ironic meditation, socio-political skepticism, and elegant misanthropy."
