= Kupyn =

Rural locality in Khmelnytskyi Oblast, Ukraine

Coordinates: 49°06′N 26°35′E

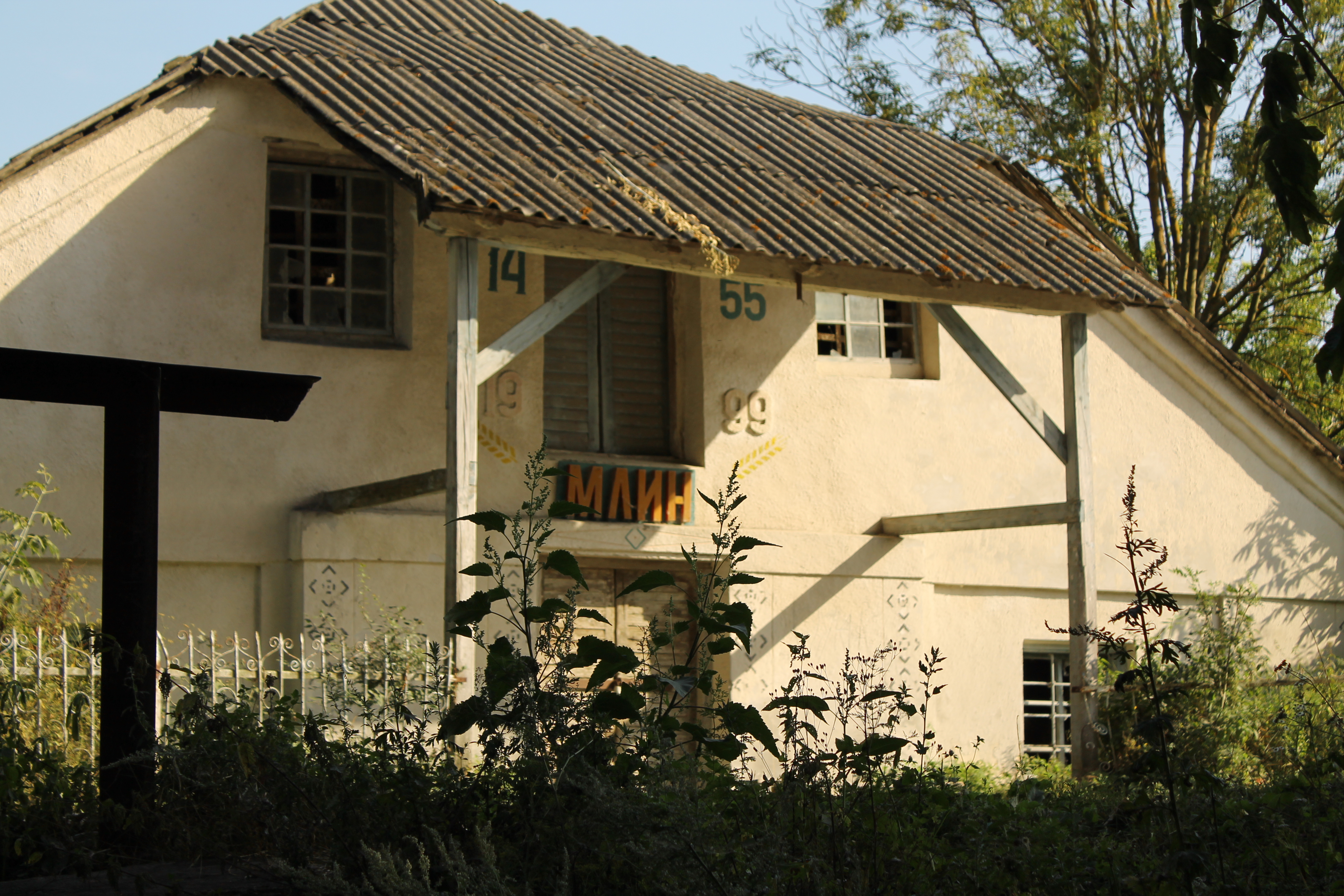

Kupyn (Ukrainian: Купин; Russian: Купин Kupin) is a village in Khmelnytskyi Raion of Khmelnytskyi Oblast, in Ukraine. It belongs to Horodok urban hromada, one of the hromadas of Ukraine.

== History ==
Jews began to settle in Kupin in the 18th century. In 1897 1,351 Jews were living in the town. In 1905, Cossacks carried out a pogrom, during which they looted property and murdered several Jews. On March 6, 1919, during the Russian civil war, the Jews suffered from pogroms. In 1926 37 percent of a total population were Jewish inhabitants. The Germans occupied Kupin in July 1941. In September 1942, Einsatzgruppen of the Ukrainian auxiliary police murdered about 300 Jews in a mass execution on the outskirts of the town near the Jewish cemetery. The town was liberated by the Red Army in March 1944.

Until 18 July 2020, Kupyn belonged to Horodok Raion. The raion was abolished in July 2020 as part of the administrative reform of Ukraine, which reduced the number of raions of Khmelnytskyi Oblast to three. The area of Horodok Raion was merged into Khmelnytskyi Raion.

== Famous people ==
- Philip Rahv

== Nearby municipalities ==
- Horodok
