= A Charmed Life =

Novel by Mary McCarthy

- First edition
- Author: Mary McCarthy
- Language: English
- Publisher: Harcourt
- Publication date: 1955
- Publication place: United States
- Media type: Print (hardback)
- Pages: 313 pp

A Charmed Life is a 1955 novel written by the American novelist Mary McCarthy.

== Setting ==
A Charmed Life takes place in the small New England town of New Leeds (presumably on Cape Cod), where "everyone is artistic, but no one is an artist."

== Characters ==
- Martha Sinnott: Martha was once married to Miles Murphy. He threw her out of the house during a feud one night, so she went to her neighbor's, the home of John Sinnott. She fell in love with and married him. She is working on a play.
- John Sinnott: John is sensitive and loving. He marries Martha after she divorces Miles, and is supportive of Martha's writing career.
- Jane Coe: Jane is a real estate agent in New Leeds. She comes from a wealthy family.
- Warren Coe: Warren is an artist. It is a town joke that he is constantly trying to incorporate the '4th dimension' (time) into his paintings. The Coes are considered the only normal couple in New Leeds.
- Miles Murphy: Miles is a pompous and self-important character. He is the most obvious villain . Despite his wickedness, which most everyone recognizes, he is also admired for his intellect. It is said that he once studied under Carl Jung.
- Helen Murphy: Helen is Miles' trophy wife. She comes from a wealthy Greek family.
- Dolly Lamb: Dolly is Martha's cousin and confidante; a new resident in New Leeds.

== Plot ==
The story begins with the simple trials and tribulations of everyday life experienced by John and Martha Sinnott. Their background stories are gradually introduced, especially during their picnic with the Coes in the beginning. One night when John is away, Martha and Miles drunkenly have sex at Martha's house after a party at the Coes'. Martha becomes pregnant, and rather than having a baby whose paternity is ambiguous, she decides to have an abortion. Warren lends Martha the money to have an abortion. The story ends with Martha dying in a car accident on her way home from the Coes' house, with the money for the abortion and the address of the clinic in her pocketbook.
