= The Group (film) =

1966 film by Sidney Lumet

- Film poster
- Directed by: Sidney Lumet
- Written by: Sidney Buchman
- Based on: The Group; 1963 novel by Mary McCarthy
- Produced by: Sidney Buchman
- Starring: Candice Bergen; Joan Hackett; Elizabeth Hartman; Shirley Knight; Joanna Pettet; Mary-Robin Redd; Jessica Walter; Kathleen Widdoes; James Broderick; James Congdon; Larry Hagman; Hal Holbrook; Richard Mulligan; Robert Emhardt; Carrie Nye
- Cinematography: Boris Kaufman
- Edited by: Ralph Rosenblum
- Music by: Charles Gross
- Production company: Famartists Productions S.A.
- Distributed by: United Artists
- Release date: March 4, 1966
- Running time: 150 minutes
- Country: United States
- Language: English
- Budget: $2.4 million
- Box office: $6 million

The Group is a 1966 American ensemble drama film directed by Sidney Lumet based on the 1963 novel of the same name by Mary McCarthy about the lives of a group of eight female graduates from the Vassar liberal arts college in the 1930s.

The cast includes Candice Bergen, Joan Hackett, Elizabeth Hartman, Shirley Knight, Jessica Walter, Kathleen Widdoes, and Joanna Pettet. The film also features small roles for Hal Holbrook, Carrie Nye, James Broderick, Larry Hagman and Richard Mulligan. The film touched on controversial topics for its time: free love, contraception, abortion, lesbianism, and mental illness.

== Plot ==
After their days at a prestigious Eastern university, eight devoted women friends go their separate ways. Wealthy and very beautiful Lakey, always regarded as their leader, leaves for Europe to begin a new life on her own.

The domestic lives of the others go mainly awry. Priss marries an overbearing, controlling doctor and has two miscarriages before she gives birth to a son. Kay, who was Lakey's pet and was always less sophisticated and wealthy than the other members of the group, marries an abusive playwright who cheats on her. After an unhappy affair with a cold, sarcastic painter, Dottie gives up a flamboyant lifestyle in Greenwich Village to marry a dull Arizona businessman. Pokey has her hands full with two sets of twins. Helena travels the world, but is unable to find happiness at home, while catty and ambitious Libby becomes successful in the literary world despite lacking depth. Polly has an affair with a married man, but later finds real happiness with a kind doctor.

With the outbreak of World War II in Europe in 1939, Lakey then returns home. When the others discover that the woman with her is more than just a traveling companion, they realize that she is a lesbian. After a tragedy that results in the death of Kay in 1940, Lakey joins them at the funeral for one last time together as the group.

== Cast ==
=== Main ===
- Candice Bergen as Elinor "Lakey" Eastlake
- Joan Hackett as Dottie Renfrew Latham
- Elizabeth Hartman as Priss Hartshorn Crockett
- Shirley Knight as Polly Andrews Ridgeley
- Joanna Pettet as Kay Strong Peterson
- Mary-Robin Redd as Mary "Pokey" Prothero Beauchamp
- Jessica Walter as Libby MacAusland
- Kathleen Widdoes as Helena Davison
- James Broderick as Dr. James "Jim" Ridgeley
- James Congdon as Sloan Crockett
- Larry Hagman as Harald Peterson
- Hal Holbrook as Gus Leroy
- Richard Mulligan as Dick Brown
- Robert Emhardt as Henry Andrews
- Carrie Nye as Norine Blake

=== Supporting ===
- Philippa Bevans as Mrs. Hartshorn
- Leta Bonynge as Mrs. Prothero
- Marion Brash as Radio Man's Wife
- Sarah Burton as Mrs. Davison
- Flora Campbell as Mrs. MacAusland
- Bruno Di Cosmi as Nils
- Leora Dana as Mrs. Renfrew
- Bill Fletcher as Bill, the Actor
- George Gaynes as Brook Latham
- Martha Greenhouse as Mrs. Bergler
- Russell Hardie as Mr. Davison
- Vince Harding as Mr. Eastlake
- Doreen Lang as Nurse Swenson
- Chet London as Radio Man
- Baruch Lumet as Mr. Schneider
- John O'Leary as Put Blake
- Hildy Parks as Nurse Catherine
- Lidia Prochnicka as The Baroness
- Polly Rowles as Mrs. Andrews
- Douglas Rutherford as Mr. Prothero
- Truman Smith as Mr. Bergler
- Loretta White as Mrs. Eastlake

=== Cameo appearance/Uncredited ===
- Arthur Anderson as Pokey's husband John Beauchamp
- Ron Charles as Dr. Jones
- Richard Graham as Rev. Garland
- Edward Holmes as Mr. MacAusland
- Brian Sands as Steven Crockett (aged 4)

== Music ==
Songs used:

- Landlord, Fill the Flowing Bowl, traditional.
- The Cannibal King, traditional.
- Liebeslieder-Walzer (Wie des Abends schöne Röte, Vögelein durchrauscht die Luft), Johannes Brahms
- Come, Ye Sons of Art!, Henry Purcell

== Release ==
The film grossed $6 million at the box office, earning $3 million in US theatrical rentals. It was the 25th highest-grossing film of 1966.

=== Home media ===
The Group was released to DVD by MGM Home Video on January 15, 2011, via the MGM Choice Collection as a Region 1 manufacture-on-demand DVD.

== Reception ==
On review aggregate website Rotten Tomatoes, The Group has an average rating of 75% based on 8 reviews.

Critic Moira Finnie of FilmStruck wrote:

The crowd of highly educated, privileged characters on the screen in The Group approached their postgraduate life in the Great Depression as though it was a midterm exam to be aced and filed away, with each milestone treated like a fast course in typing or dancing, another skill acquired, to be trotted out at the next luncheon with the other girls in the group. Full of ideas about a woman's role in the society, but with little real life experience other than in school, the movie chronicles their continued education in the real world.

Bosley Crowther of The New York Times panned it as "a rambling account of the thoroughly banal domestic doings of these eight girl graduates," "so atrociously staged" and "so awkwardly and mawkishly played that it sems [sic] not only a travesty of the nineteen-thirties but an insult to a generation of human beings." Variety wrote that the film is faithful to the novel but retains too much detail.

=== Awards ===
Joan Hackett was nominated for the BAFTA Award for Best Foreign Actress. The film was nominated for the Golden Bear at the 16th Berlin International Film Festival in 1966. Candice Bergen was nominated for a Golden Globe Award for Most Promising Newcomer.

== See also ==
- List of American films of 1966
