= National Medal for Literature =

Literary award

The National Medal for Literature was a literary award recognizing an individual for distinguished and continuing contributions to American letters. First presented to Thornton Wilder by Lady Bird Johnson at a White House ceremony in 1965, the award consisted of a cash prize of $15,000 and a bronze medal.

The National Medal for Literature was established by the National Book Committee, a nonprofit society; other sponsors included the National Institute of Arts and Letters (1975–77), and the New York Public Library (1978, 1984). The National Medal for Literature was typically presented as part of the National Book Awards, renamed the American Book Awards during the 1980s.

The medal was not presented for 1974–75, nor 1982–83. After a brief hiatus, the prize was effectively replaced in 1988 with the Medal for Distinguished Contribution to American Letters, awarded by the National Book Foundation.

== Medalists ==
- Thornton Wilder (1965)
- Edmund Wilson (1966)
- W.H. Auden (1967)
- Marianne Moore (1968)
- Conrad Aiken (1969)
- Robert Penn Warren (1970)
- E. B. White (1971)
- Lewis Mumford (1972)
- Vladimir Nabokov (1973)
- Allen Tate (1976)
- Robert Lowell (1977)
- Archibald MacLeish (1978)
- Eudora Welty (1979)
- Kenneth Burke (1980)
- John Cheever (1981)
- Mary McCarthy (1984)

== See also ==
- List of literary awards
