= The Life of the Mind =

Posthumous and incomplete philosophy book by Hannah Arendt

- First editions
- Author: Hannah Arendt
- Language: English
- Subject: Moral philosophy
- Publisher: Harcourt Brace Jovanovich
- Publication date: 1977–1978
- Publication place: United States
- Media type: Print
- Pages: 2 vols. 277, 278
- ISBN: 978-0-15-651992-2

The Life of the Mind was the final work of Hannah Arendt (1906–1975), and was unfinished at the time of her death. Designed to be in three parts, only the first two had been completed and the first page of the third part was in her typewriter the evening of the day she suddenly died. The unfinished work was edited by her friend, author Mary McCarthy, and published in two volumes in 1977 and 1978.

== History ==
Arendt's last major work, The Life of the Mind remained incomplete at the time of her death. Arendt had long considered writing a work on the mental faculties involved in the philosophy of the mind. From the time she completed The Human Condition in 1958, she wanted to complement it by proceeding from the vita activa (active life) to the vita contemplativa (contemplative life). (Note: Vita activa was Arendt's preferred title, but only her German publisher acceded to this wish) The intent of the progression of this thought is made clear in the book. She first addressed the second part in her preface to Between Past and Future (1961), which she eventually developed into The Life of the Mind, more than ten years later, her book on thinking. Her concepts became crystallized in 1963 when she wrote Eichmann in Jerusalem: A Report on the Banality of Evil in which she described how "thoughtlessness", the lack of thinking, could result in evil. From then onwards she became invested in the relationship between thinking and morality. To develop this relationship, she realized would now require a major exploration of the Mind.

An invitation to deliver the 1973–1974 Gifford Lectures in Aberdeen (the first woman to do so), provided an incentive to gather together a variety of materials including courses she had taught over the last few years on "Basic Moral Propositions," "Thinking," "The History of the Will," "Kant's Critique of Judgment", together with two essays, "Truth and Politics" and "Thinking Moral Considerations (1971)." This material she called The Life of the Mind. She delivered the first set of lectures on "Thinking" in 1973, advocating what she referred to as Denken ohne Geländer (thinking without a bannister). The second set of lectures on "Willing" were due to be delivered in May 1974, but during the first lecture she sustained a near fatal heart attack, and the remainder of the series were postponed till 1976. Her premature death in December 1975 prevented this, but she had completed the manuscript shortly before her death. Nevertheless, she had sufficiently recovered by late 1974 to offer the Gifford subject matter in her courses at the New School in 1974 and 1975 (where she was due to retire in 1976).

The nature of the missing third part has continued to be a matter of great speculation. During her visiting professorship at the New School in 1974, she presented a graduate level political philosophy class entitled, Philosophy of the Mind. It was during these class lectures that she crystallized her concepts. The class was based on her working draft of Philosophy of the Mind, which would later be edited to become Life of the Mind. Arendt's working draft was distributed to her graduate students. She conceived of a trilogy based on the mental activities of thinking, willing, and judging.

Stemming from her Gifford Lectures at the University of Aberdeen in Scotland (1972–1974), her last writing focused on the first two. In a sense, Life of the Mind went beyond her previous work concerning the vita activa. In her discussion of thinking, she focuses mainly on Socrates and his notion of thinking as a solitary dialogue between oneself. This appropriation of Socrates leads her to introduce novel concepts of conscience—an enterprise that gives no positive prescriptions, but instead, tells one what I cannot do if I would remain friends with myself when I re-enter the two-in-one of thought where I must render an account of my actions to myself—and morality—an entirely negative enterprise concerned with forbidding participation in certain actions for the sake of remaining friends with oneself. She died suddenly five days after completing the second part, with the first page of Judging still in her typewriter. The task then fell to McCarthy to edit the first two parts and provide some indication of the direction of the third.

Although Arendt's exact intentions in the third part are unknown, she did leave manuscripts (such as Thinking and Moral Considerations and Some Questions on Moral Philosophy) and lectures (Lectures on Kant's Political Philosophy) concerning her thoughts on the mental faculty of Judging. The first two articles were edited and published in an anthology (Responsibility and Judgement) by Jerome Kohn, one of Arendt's assistants and a director of the Hannah Arendt Center at The New School in New York, in 2003. The last was edited and published by Ronald Beiner, professor of political science at the University of Toronto, in 1982. "Thinking" originally appeared in the New Yorker in a somewhat different form.

== Structure ==
The book begins with two epigraphs, one of them is the same from Cato the Elder, (Note: Cato, cited by Cicero, slightly differently, in both De re publica I, 27 and De Officiis III, 1, possibly from Origines, which has not survived) with which she ended The Human Condition:

Numquam se plus agere quam nihil cum ageret, numquam minus solum esse quam cum solus esset
(Never is he more active than when he does nothing, never is he less alone than when he is by himself)

It was planned in two parts, "Thinking" and "Willing and Judgement". All that she had typed for "Judgement" at the time of her death were two epigraphs (see image). The first was the epigraph with which she had ended "Thinking":

Victrix causa diis placuit sed victa Catoni
(The victorious cause pleased the gods, but the vanquished pleases Cato) (Note: This was a phrase given to Cato the Younger by Lucan in Pharsalia, an epic depicting the Battle of Pharsalus that would doom the Roman Republic)

Arendt, here draws attention to Cato, who unlike Eichmann, clearly distinguished between right and wrong and was steadfast in his judgement. The second epigraph was this stanza by Faust from Goethe's drama of that name (II: Act V 11404–7):

Könnt' ich Magie von meinem Pfad entfernen,
Die Zaubersprüche ganz und gar verlernen,
Stünd' ich, Natur, vor dir ein Mann allein,
Da wär's der Mühe wert, ein Mensch zu sein.

(If I could banish [Magic] from my track,
Unlearn the [spells] that draw me back,
And stand before you, Nature, as mere Man,
[Then would it] be worth the [trouble] of being Human.)

Arendt outlines her intent for "Judgement" in her postscriptum to "Thinking". In the place of the unwritten "Judgement" section, McCarthy substituted relevant excerpts from Arendt's lectures on Kant's political philosophy delivered at the New School in the fall of 1970, as a guide to her thinking on the subject.

== Bibliography ==
- Addison, Sam (1972–1974). "Hannah Arendt: The Life of the Mind". Gifford Lectures. University of Aberdeen.
- Beiner, Ronald (Spring 1980). "Judging in a world of appearances: A Commentary on Hannah Arendt's Unwritten Finale". History of Political Thought. 1 (1): 117–135. JSTOR 26211840.
- Jonas, Hans (1977). "Acting, Knowing, Thinking: Gleanings from Hannah Arendt's Philosophical Work". Social Research. 44 (1): 25–43. JSTOR 40970269.
- Kampowski, Stephan (2008). Arendt, Augustine, and the New Beginning: The Action Theory and Moral Thought of Hannah Arendt in the Light of Her Dissertation on St. Augustine. Wm. B. Eerdmans Publishing. ISBN 978-0-8028-2724-1.
- Luban, David. Arendt After Jerusalem: The Moral and Legal Philosophy (PDF). To be published. Archived from the original (PDF) on 15 December 2018.
- Young-Bruehl, Elizabeth (May 1982). "Reflections on Hannah Arendt's the Life of the Mind". Political Theory. 10 (2): 277–305. doi:10.1177/0090591782010002008. S2CID 144968408.
- Young-Bruehl, Elisabeth (2004) [1982]. Hannah Arendt: For Love of the World (Second ed.). Yale University Press. ISBN 978-0-300-10588-9. (updated by way of a second preface, pagination unchanged) (Note: 1st ed. Preface ix–xxv; 2nd ed. Preface to Second Edition ix–xxxvi, Preface xxxvii-l)

=== Historical sources ===
- Cicero, Marcus Tullius (1928) [54 BC]. Keyes, Clinton Walker (ed.). De Re Publica: De Legibus (in Latin and English). trans. Keyes (1977 reprint ed.). William Heinemann (Harvard University Press). ISBN 978-0-674-99235-1.
- Goethe, Johann Wolfgang von (1832). Faust. Der Tragödie zweiter Teil. Stuttgart: J. G. Cotta. Archived from the original on August 2, 2015.

=== Works by Hannah Arendt ===
- Arendt, Hannah (1981) [1978]. McCarthy, Mary (ed.). The Life of the Mind: The Groundbreaking Investigation on How We Think. New York: Harcourt Brace Jovanovich. ISBN 978-0-547-54147-1. Online text at Pensar el Espacio Público
  - — (1981) [1978]. McCarthy, Mary (ed.). The Life of the Mind. Volume I: Thinking. New York: Harcourt Brace Jovanovich. ISBN 978-0-15-651992-2.
  - Donoghue, Denis (Summer 1979). "Hannah Arendt's "The Life of the Mind"". The Hudson Review (Review). 32 (2): 281–288. doi:10.2307/3849978. JSTOR 3849978.
  - Mckenna, George (November 1978). "The Life of the Mind". The Journal of Politics (Review). 40 (4): 1086–1088. doi:10.2307/2129914. JSTOR 2129914.
- — (1992) [1982]. Beiner, Ronald (ed.). Lectures on Kant's Political Philosophy. University of Chicago Press. ISBN 978-0-226-23178-5. Online text also Internet Archive
- — (2009) [2003, Schocken]. Kohn, Jerome (ed.). Responsibility and Judgment. Knopf Doubleday Publishing Group. ISBN 978-0-307-54405-6.
  - — (1975), Prologue: Sonning Prize acceptance speech, pp. 3–16
  - — (1964), Personal responsibility under dictatorship (PDF), pp. 17–48

=== External images ===
- Arendt, Hannah (1975). Life of the Mind: Judging. University of Chicago Press. ISBN 9780226025957.
