= The Group (novel) =

1963 novel by Mary McCarthy

- First edition
- Author: Mary McCarthy
- Language: English
- Publisher: Harcourt, Brace
- Publication date: 1963
- Publication place: United States
- Pages: 378
- OCLC: 282992
- LC Class: PZ3.M1272 Gs

The Group is the best-known novel of American writer Mary McCarthy. It made New York Times Best Seller list in 1963 and remained there for almost two years. In 1966, United Artists released a film adaptation of the book.

The novel touched on controversial topics for its time, such as free love, contraception, abortion, lesbianism, and mental illness. It was banned in Australia, Italy, and Ireland.

== Plot ==
The book describes the lives of eight female friends following their graduation in 1933 from Vassar College, beginning with the marriage of one of them, Kay Strong, and ending with her funeral in 1940. Each character struggles with different issues, including sexism in the work place, child-rearing, financial difficulties, family crises, and sexual relationships. Nearly all the women's issues involve the men in their lives: fathers, employers, lovers, or husbands. As highly educated women from affluent backgrounds, they must strive for autonomy and independence in a time when a woman's role is still largely restricted to marriage and childbirth. The plot is influenced by the political and economic atmosphere of the time. Throughout the book, the reader is exposed to the women's views on contraception, love, sex, socialism, and psychoanalysis.

== Characters ==
Kay Strong: Marries Harald Petersen, who is involved in theater management and stage directing. Kay calls him a "Yale man", even though he did only graduate work there; this mildly offends the analytical Lakey. Harald writes plays that are not produced and is frequently unemployed. Kay has "a ruthless hatred of poor people", and is frustrated by their financial situation. She supports them by working at Macy's and cares greatly about her material surroundings. Her husband has multiple extramarital affairs. Their fights and his drinking escalate; finally he hits her until she threatens him with a bread knife. The next morning, he commits her to a psychiatric hospital, where Polly is working as a nurse. Kay is released from the hospital; she divorces Harald. Her death at the end of the book is mysterious; no one knows whether she fell from the window on the twentieth floor of the Vassar Club, while airplane spotting, or whether she jumped. Her friends reunite at the end of the novel at her funeral, where they shun Harald.

Mary Prothero, "Pokey": The wealthiest of the Group. Described as a "fat, cheerful New York society girl", "very rich and lazy". Pokey says she made it through Vassar only with the help of Priss, a Phi Beta Kappa. Pokey's father gives her a plane so she is able to commute to Cornell Agricultural School; her mother, upon learning that Harald was arrested at a labor demonstration, is devastated that a "jailbird" once dined at the Prothero home. Pokey eventually marries. Her family has an earnest, eccentric, and observant butler named Hatton, who comes to Kay's funeral.

Dottie Renfrew: From a Boston family, she plans to be a welfare worker after Vassar. She goes home from Kay's wedding with Dick Brown, a poor artist, and she encourages him to take her virginity. Afterwards, he treats her abruptly and warns her not to fall in love with him. He tells her that "things" (i.e., sex) can be a lot better between them if she would go see a "lady doctor" (so that he wouldn't have to use withdrawal, which he did use in this instance, or condoms, in order to prevent a pregnancy). He explains that he prefers diaphragms for upper-class women, such as Dottie, or condoms for lower-class women. She is fitted for a diaphragm by a female Manhattan gynecologist who is willing to fit unmarried as well as married women (birth control then being illegal in Massachusetts, Dottie's home state, and many other states). Dick has not called her or returned her calls. She returns to Dick's apartment, but he is not there. She waits for him for hours in Washington Square Park; eventually she discards her birth-control kit under a park bench and returns to Boston. Dottie eventually marries Brook Latham from Arizona. Before her wedding, she admits to her perceptive mother that she has slept with Dick and is still in love with him. Her mother suggests that she postpone her wedding, and to see Dick and explore her feelings for him, and in any case to obtain birth control, but Dottie rejects those ideas and marries Brook on schedule, and soon thereafter is pregnant with her husband's child.

Elinor Eastlake, "Lakey": From Lake Forest, Illinois. She is the most beautiful and, after Pokey, the wealthiest of the group; she is cool and aristocratic, a "dark beauty", with pale skin, black hair, and large green eyes. She spends most of the book in Europe, where she goes to study art history and get a doctorate. At the end of the book, she returns to America, having fled the war in Europe. The Group assembles at the pier to greet her arrival, where they find Lakey accompanied by the Baroness, who, it transpires, is her lesbian lover. The group notes that the Baroness is not terribly bright; they are conflicted over Lakey's sexual orientation.

Polly Andrews: Her family suffers financial losses due to the Depression. She is pretty, with "almost flaxen hair", "milk-white skin" and "big blue eyes". She lives in a building where most of her neighbors are socialists, and she works as a technician in a local hospital. She has an affair with Gus LeRoy, a married publisher, who is going through psychoanalysis at the request of his wife. Polly does not understand why he needs analysis, and after reading Freud, she decides that she herself needs analysis. Gus eventually leaves Polly and goes back to his wife. Polly's father, who has just gotten divorced from Polly's mother and has bipolar disorder, comes to live with Polly. Her father converts to Trotskyism. In the manic phase of his disorder, he overspends their budget, forcing Polly to sell her blood at the hospital. Polly marries Dr. Jim Ridgeley, a psychiatrist, who offers her financial and moral support.

Priss Hartshorn: An idealistic believer in the FDR program, she marries Dr. Sloan Crockett, a pediatrician. She has a job with the National Recovery Administration. She gives birth to Stephen, whom she has difficulty breast-feeding and potty-training. Under the hospital regimen, she sleeps apart from her son, whom she hears crying most of the nights. Her husband wishes her to feed Stephen her breast milk rather than formula, a somewhat radical notion at the time. Priss, pressured at the hospital to allow them to bottle feed the baby, also feels pressured by her husband, thinking, "Sloan…was enamored of his own theories, which he wanted to enforce, like Prohibition, regardless of the human factor".

Helena Davison: "A short, sandy haired girl with an appealing snub nose", Helena was "regarded as the droll member of the group", because of her sense of humor. Her mother has her "tutored in every conceivable subject", including athletics, musical instruments, outdoor activities and crafts. Despite her Vassar education, she gets a job as a teacher at an experimental school in Cleveland, Ohio, teaching "finger-painting". She catches Kay's husband kissing another woman, Norine, a Vassar girl who was involved in left politics and not in The Group. She decides not to tell Kay, but agrees to go to Norine's house to talk. Norine's husband is impotent and Norine has had several affairs. Norine asks Helena how she should fix her life, and Helena makes several suggestions, including scrubbing the floor, painting the sitting room a different color, and buying "some real food". By the end of the novel, Helena moves to New York to pursue an art career. She is the only character who remains single.

Libby MacAusland: A "tall, pretty blonde", who majored in English and is determined to break into the New York publishing industry. Gus LeRoy, the publisher, hires her to read book manuscripts. For $5 apiece, she reads the manuscripts and writes a summary and opinion. Libby can read Italian, so Gus gives her an Italian manuscript to summarize. However, the book is mostly in a dialect, which she can't understand and she writes an inaccurate report. Gus fires her: "Publishing's a man's business…. Marry a publisher, Miss MacAusland, and be his hostess." He later gets her a job as a literary agent's assistant and then an agent herself, becoming wealthy in the process and living well. A Norwegian baron and ski jumper, Nils Aslund, tries to seduce her by reading Marlowe's "The Passionate Shepherd to His Love". Libby tries to fend him off by quoting Sir Walter Raleigh's "The Shepherdess Replies". Nils replies by ripping her clothes off and attempting to rape her; he desists when she tells him she is a virgin.

Norine Schmittlapp: She is Vassar '33, but not a member of The Group. Talking to Helena, she says, "You people were the aesthetes. We were the politicals." Norine is interested in psychoanalysis, socialism, and anthropology. She has a dog named Nietzsche. While married to Putnam Blake, she has an affair with Harald, Kay's husband. Norine's husband, Put, has impotency; according to Norine, he is only aroused by "fallen women". Norine helps Harald put Kay in the psychiatric ward by convincing Kay that she needs a rest. She spreads the rumor that Kay was mentally disturbed, saying to Priss, "A lot of basic things were the matter. Sex. Competitiveness with men. An underlying Lesbian drive that was too firmly repressed. Thwarted social strivings." Norine later divorces Put, and marries Freddy Rogers, a wealthy banker who has suffered from anti-Jewish discrimination. She has a son, Ichabod. Priss is horrified by her choice of name and her careless manner of raising Ichabod. Norine tells Priss that her husband expects her to be a dutiful housewife, but Norine says "Our Vassar education made it tough for me to accept my womanly role". Norine believes that because of her education, she is "crippled for life".

== Background ==
In some aspects the novel is autobiographical in a satirical tone. Mary McCarthy studied literature at Vassar College and graduated in 1933, which is the class year of her group of eight characters. McCarthy's classmates from Vassar accused her of basing The Group characters on them and their experiences. Her first husband, Harald Johnsrud, shares the first name of the husband of the character Kay; the unusual (Nordic) spelling of the name is discussed several times in the novel. In parts of the book where McCarthy discusses sex, such as when Dottie loses her virginity, the author claims to come from her memories with past lovers, as an observer. McCarthy was also a supporter of Leon Trotsky, a political position shared by another of the characters in the novel, Polly Andrews.

Mary McCarthy adopted the title of "lady-writer" mostly given by male critics. Although her works are supposedly written for women, they are commended by feminists. McCarthy denied being a feminist or writing for the "second-wave of feminism" as she believed in equality and freedom of rights but did not view it as a gender issue.

== Reception ==
The novel stayed on the New York Times best-seller list for almost two years. It was banned in Australia, Italy, and Ireland for being offensive to public morals. The novel was reviewed critically and intensely for its vivid detail, length, and number of characters. At the time of its release, men questioned McCarthy's ability to be a professional writer. Notably, Norman Mailer for The New York Review of Books wrote "her book fails as a novel by being good but not nearly good enough...she is simply not a good enough woman to write a major novel."

When an editor suggested to Candace Bushnell that she write "the modern-day version of The Group", she wrote Sex and the City, a collection of revealing essays that became the popular TV series and film. As Bushnell summarizes: "The Group reminds us that not much has really changed".

== Adaptations ==
The book was the basis for the 1966 Sidney Lumet-directed film, The Group, starring Candice Bergen as Lakey, Joan Hackett as Dottie, and Elizabeth Hartman as Priss. The film was produced and released by United Artists. Hackett was nominated for a BAFTA Film Award for her performance and the film was nominated in West Berlin for the Golden Bear.

In 2001, The Group was broadcast on BBC Radio 4. It was adapted by Moya O'Shea, produced/Directed by Tracey Neale, and starred Gayle Hunnicutt, Rebecca Front, Teresa Gallagher, Joanna Weir, Tara Ward, Laurel Lefkow, Lorelei King, Moya O'Shea, Mark Caven, Henry Goodman, and William Hope.

== Popular culture references ==
The book appears in a season three episode of the television series Mad Men titled "The Color Blue" (2009, S03E10), in which Betty Draper is shown reading it. It is also referred to in the pilot episode of the series American Dreams, during a scene in which one member of a woman's book group suggests The Group as a title that might make her contemporaries re-evaluate their lives as housewives. The suggestion is quickly dismissed by the group's leader, ("Oh! That sounds so...depressing"), who rules in favor of Book of the Month Club's The Shoes of the Fisherman. In the following episode of American Dreams, one of the main characters, Helen Pryor, reads the book and she says that "her whole world is falling apart" because of it.

It is also mentioned in the Mystery Science Theater 3000 short "The Home Economics Story" (where Joel Robinson referring to the group of college students from that short as "The Group") as well as the episode featuring the film "The Sinister Urge" (where Mike Nelson refers to a group of young women as "Mary McCarthy's The Group").

In the film The Sterile Cuckoo (1969), the character of Pookie Adams (Liza Minnelli) can be seen clutching a copy of The Group when she departs the bus after her first encounter with love interest Jerry Payne. Mentioned in A Right to Die (1964) by Rex Stout: Nero Wolfe "had read two chapters and ditched it."

In a season 1 episode of Gilmore Girls titled "Rory's Dance" (2000, S01E09), Rory is seen reading a copy of the book as she stands in line to buy tickets to a dance.

In Season 1 Episode 1 of The Bob Newhart Show titled "Fly the Unfriendly Skies" The book can be seen behind Suzanne Pleshette when she is sitting on the couch crying.

It is mentioned in Lady in the Lake by Laura Lippman when a character says if she were a lesbian, she'd be like Lakey.

In Dorothy Allison’s Bastard Out Of Carolina, Bone looks forward to reading the paperback copy she snuck out of the library.
