= Raziel Abelson =

American academic

Raziel Abelson (24 June 1921 – 14 June 2017) was an American academic. He served as Professor of Philosophy Emeritus at New York University and was a proponent of the Ordinary Language School of Philosophy.

== Biography ==
He was born in Brooklyn, New York, the son of Rabbi Alter Abelson and Anna Goldina Schwartz. His brother was the playwright Lionel Abel (1910–2001).

He received a M.A. from the University of Chicago in 1950 with the thesis "Bertrand Russell's theory of truth", and a Ph.D. in 1960 from New York University with a thesis "An analysis of the concept of definition, and critique of three traditional philosophical views concerning its role in knowledge".

Abelson died in June 2017 at the age of 95.

== Works ==
- Abelson, Raziel Ethics and Metaethics NY: St Martin's, 1963
- Abelson, Raziel. Lawless Mind. Philadelphia: Temple University Press, 1988.
- Abelson, Raziel. Persons: A Study in Philosophical Psychology. New York: St. Martin's Press; London: Macmillan, 1977
- Abelson, Raziel, Marie-Louise Friquegnon, and Michael Lockwood. The Philosophical Imagination New York: St Martins, 1977.
- Abelson, Raziel, and Marie-Louise Friquegnon. Ethics for Modern Life. New York: St. Martin's Press, 1975. According to WorldCat, the book is held in 1077 libraries
- Abelson, Raziel." Common Sense Morality." New York: Global Scholarly Publications 2015

== See also ==
- Lionel Abel
- New York University Department of Philosophy
