= Nicholas Macdonald =

American author and filmmaker (born 1944)

Nicholas Gardiner Macdonald (born October 22, 1944) is an American author and filmmaker (as Nick Macdonald) who made several independent films during the 1970s, including Break Out! (1971) and The Liberal War (1974). His book In Search of «La Grande Illusion»: a Critical Appreciation of Jean Renoir's Elusive Masterpiece was published in November 2013.

Macdonald's anti-Vietnam War film, The Liberal War, is set in a utopian, anarchist future, looking back critically on the John F. Kennedy administration's prosecution of the war in Vietnam. Contrary to the belief held by many that JFK intended to decrease American military involvement in Southeast Asia at the time of his assassination, The Liberal War argues that he had every intention of continuing his expansion of the conflict in Vietnam. The Liberal War was acquired for the Study Collection of the Museum of Modern Art (MoMA) in 1976.

His films have been shown in New York City at Film Forum, Museum of Modern Art, Whitney Museum of American Art, Brooklyn Academy of Music and many independent forums and universities. In 2016, the first major retrospective of Macdonald's films outside of New York was held at the University of Chicago, sponsored by South Side Projections (which originated the screening) and the Chicago Underground Film Festival. The same program showed at UnionDocs in New York in April 2017.

Macdonald lives in Brooklyn, New York, and is the son of American writer and critic Dwight Macdonald.
