= Lionel Abel =

American dramatist

- Born: November 19, 1910; Brooklyn, New York City, New York
- Died: April 19, 2001 (aged 90); Manhattan, New York City, New York
- Occupation: Dramatist
- Writing career
- Notable work: Metatheater

Lionel Abel (28 November 1910- 19 April 2001, in Manhattan, New York) was an eminent Jewish American playwright, essayist and theater critic. He was also a translator, and was an authorized translator of Jean-Paul Sartre, who called Abel the most intelligent man in New York City.

His first success was a tragedy, Absalom, staged off-Broadway in 1956 and winner of the Obie award. It was followed by three other works of drama, before he turned to criticism. He is best known for coining the term metatheatre in his book of the same title.

He was one of the signers of the Humanist Manifesto II.

== Biography ==
Born in Brooklyn, Abel was the son of Alter Abelson, a rabbi and poet, and of Anna Schwartz Abelson, a writer of short stories. His brother, Raziel Abelson (1921–2017) was a professor emeritus of philosophy at New York University; he also had two sisters.

He graduated from high school at the age of fourteen and moved out of his parents' home when he was fifteen, also shortening his name around this time. He attended St. John's University in New York from 1926 to 1928, and then transferred to the University of North Carolina, which he attended from 1928 to 1929. However, he was expelled for publishing a magazine and never earned a college degree. Afterwards, he moved to Greenwich Village in New York.

In 1939, he married Sherry Goldman, whom he later divorced. In 1970, Abel married Gloria Becker.

== Career ==
Despite never obtaining a college degree, he was offered a professor position at the State University of New York at Buffalo because of his writings. After teaching appointments at Columbia and Rutgers Universities and at the Pratt Institute, he concluded his academic career in the English Department of the University at Buffalo, before retiring to New York City.

In 1948, he co-founded and co-edited the journal Instead (New York).

He is also the author of several important translations from the French, including texts by André Breton and Guillaume Apollinaire. A lively and sometimes cantankerous polemicist, he counted numerous members of his generation's intellectual elite among his friends and sparring partners, including Delmore Schwartz, Meyer Schapiro, Clement Greenberg, Robert Lowell, Randall Jarrell, Lionel Trilling, James Agee, Mary McCarthy, Hannah Arendt, Leslie Fiedler and Elizabeth Hardwick.

== Criticism of Hannah Arendt ==
Abel participated in the heated debate that followed the publication of Arendt's Eichmann in Jerusalem. He criticized the work in "an outright frontal assault" in an article in the Partisan Review, The subsequent responses and counter-responses occupied several subsequent issues. In early October 1963 Dissent Magazine organized a public event for detractors and supporters of Arendt's work to air their positions; it was moderated by Irving Howe and attended by a packed audience of "more than 300 people" at the Woodstock Hotel in New York City. Abel was invited to participate and accepted; Arendt herself did not attend. The event quickly veered away from calm discussion and was marked by frequent interruptions. Later accounts described it variously as "passionate and exciting", "unruly", or as "ugly and outrageous, yet also urgent and afire." Attendees who expressed support of Arendt's work claimed they were "shouted down" and prevented from speaking. Holocaust historian Raul Hilberg, who attended as a speaker, complained, "I was not allowed to finish. A panelist [Lionel Abel] pounded on the table with his fist. His banging, magnified by the microphone, was followed by a cascade of boos," and that the rest of the event consisted of audience responses in which individuals berated and disparaged the participants speaking in support of Arendt.

In a 1995 response letter to an article concerning Arendt by Tony Judt, both published in the NYRB, Abel expressed regret for having participated in the event, stating that "It was not proper to address complex ideas as the Dissent meeting tried to do. "

== Awards ==
Abel received a Guggenheim fellowship in 1958, a Longview award in 1960, an award from the National Institute of Arts and Letters in 1964, and a Rockefeller Foundation grant in 1966. His play "Absalom" won an Obie award as the best play of the 1956 Off-Broadway season and a Show business award.

== Works ==
=== Dramas ===
- "The Death of Odysseus" (New York, Amato Theatre, 1953)
- "Absalom" (New York, Artist's Theatre, 1956)
- "The Pretender" (New York, Cherry Lane Theatre, 1960)
- "The Wives" (New York, 1960)

=== Criticism ===
- Metatheatre; a new view of dramatic form (1963)
- Our first serious fascist? (1980)
- The Intellectual Follies: A Memoir of the Literary Venture in New York and Paris (1984)
- Sidney Hook's career: (the philosopher in politics) (1985)
- Important Nonsense (1987)
- Tragedy and Metatheatre: Essays on Dramatic Form (2003)

=== Anthology ===
- Moderns on Tragedy: An Anthology of Modern and Relevant Opinions on the Substance and Meaning of Tragedy (1967)

=== Translations ===
- Camille Pissarro: Letters to His Son Lucien
