= Politics (1940s magazine) =

American leftist and literary magazine

politics
- Editor: Dwight Macdonald
- Categories: Politics, literary
- Frequency: Monthly
- Founder: Dwight Macdonald
- Founded: 1944
- First issue: February, 1944
- Final issue: Winter, 1949
- Country: United States
- Based in: New York City, New York
- Language: English
- OCLC: 494033781

Politics, stylized as politics, was a journal founded and edited by Dwight Macdonald from 1944 to 1949.

Macdonald had previously been editor at Partisan Review from 1937 to 1943, but after falling out with its publishers, quit to start Politics as a rival publication, first on a monthly basis and then as a quarterly.

Politics published essays on politics and culture and included among its contributors James Agee, John Berryman, Bruno Bettelheim, Paul Goodman, C. Wright Mills, Mary McCarthy, Marianne Moore, Irving Howe, Daniel Bell, and Hannah Arendt.

The journal reflected Macdonald's interest in European culture. He used Politics to introduce US readers to the thinking of the French philosopher Simone Weil, publishing several articles by her, including "A Poem of Force", her reflections on the Iliad. He also printed work by Albert Camus. Another European, the Italian political and literary critic Nicola Chiaromonte, was also given space in the journal.

Politics was also Macdonald's vehicle for his repeated and energetic attacks against Henry Wallace and his Progressive Party campaign for President.

In a letter to Philip Rahv at the end of December 1943, George Orwell mentioned that Macdonald had written asking him to contribute to his forthcoming journal. Orwell had replied telling him he might "do something 'cultural'" but not 'political' as he was already writing his "London Letters" to Partisan Review.

In his "As I Please" article for the 16 June 1944 issue of Tribune, George Orwell recommended Politics. He stated that he disagreed with its policy but admired "its combination of highbrow political analysis with intelligent literary criticism." He went on to add that there were no monthly or quarterly magazines in England "to come up to" the American ones, of which there were several.

Macdonald, in an editorial comment for the November 1944 issue of Politics referred to a letter from Orwell which cast interesting light on the 'russification' of English political thought over the last two years. Orwell had read the May issue's review of Harold Laski's Faith, Reason and Civilisation and mentioned that the Manchester Evening News, the evening edition of the Manchester Guardian, had refused to print his own review because of its anti-Stalin implications. Despite considering the book "pernicious tripe", Orwell had praised the author for being "aware that the USSR is the real dynamo of the Socialist movement in this country and everywhere else.", but criticized him for shutting his eyes to "purges, liquidations", etc. Macdonald pointed out that the fact that such a review should be considered "too hot" shows how much the feats of the Red Army had misled the English public opinion about Russia. He added that the "English liberal press had been far more honest about the Moscow Trials than our own liberal journals" and that Trotsky had been able to write in the Guardian.

== Dwight Macdonald: Culture as politics – and Politics as culture ==
As a prototypical "one-man magazine", Politics bore the sensibility and characteristic preoccupations of its founding, and sole, editor, the literary and polemical journalist Dwight Macdonald (1906–1982), whose cantankerous past in the face of institutional authority of all kinds furnished a fitting prologue to his six-year tenure in the editor's chair. After his undergraduate years at Yale – during which he gained early notoriety for his critique in the student newspaper of William Lyon Phelps, a pillar of the university's English faculty, and a lecturer and media figure with a national following – and a brief stint in the Executive Training Squad at the R. H. Macy department-store company, Macdonald landed a position as a writer and associate editor in 1929 at Fortune, the business monthly launched the year of the American stock market crash by Henry Luce, a Yale alumnus eight years Macdonald's senior whose stable of iconic magazines had begun in 1923 with Time. Exposure to the many captains of industry whose works and ways he profiled, set against the deepening Depression, sharpened in him a disdain for capitalism which made common cause with an elitist, aristocratic artistic sensibility that admired the classical European past as a sustaining and shaming foil to what he saw as the cultural degradations attendant upon the ascendancy of mass society. As a result, much of Macdonald's outwardly political criticism would take puckish aim at one or another of the stylistic infelicities, whether verbal or in manners, of the reigning pundits and politicians of the day, along with a critical tendency, somewhat like that of an earlier journalistic-literary "rebel in defense of tradition" (to borrow the title of Macdonald's biographer Michael Wreszin), H. L. Mencken, more characteristically negative in tenor than constructive, programmatic or partisan – Mencken's claim that "one horse-laugh is worth ten thousand syllogisms" might well have been Macdonald's own.

Upon leaving Fortune in 1936, after a dispute over his epic four-part profile of U.S. Steel one of whose crescendoes was an epigram from Lenin on imperialism as the highest stage of capitalism, he immersed himself in the works of Marx, Lenin and Trotsky, a schooling which, against the backdrop of the Moscow Trials and the bitter divisions over their authenticity across the American left intelligentsia, led him to side with the Trotskyist faction against the Stalinists. The New York social critic Paul Goodman, whose early essays in Politics seeded his flowering into mainstream fame twenty years later, famously asserted that Macdonald "thinks with his typewriter", a restless, perpetually self-revising (and, often enough in rueful retrospect, self-mocking) quality that saw Macdonald studding the later book versions of his magazine essays with a sort of after-the-fact Greek chorus of second thoughts, self-recriminations and liberal, as it were, doses of l'esprit de l'escalier, that lent his writing a quality one critic labeled "stereophonic."

=== The Partisan Review prelude ===
Macdonald spent the years from 1937 to 1943 as an associate editor at Partisan Review, among the most famous of 20th-century American little magazines, founded as a Communist journal in 1934 but wrested three years later by a dissident faction led by its to-be veteran co-editors Philip Rahv and William Phillips, a journal synonymous with those "New York intellectuals" wedded equally to an independent radicalism in politics and the modernist avant-garde in literature. Macdonald's steadfast neutrality over the Second World War put him increasingly at odds with his fellow editors, and with much of left opinion following first the attack by Hitler upon Russia and then by the Japanese upon Pearl Harbor affording the Americans, along with Hitler's declaration of war upon the United States in turn, a casus belli unto the larger conflict, prompting him to resign from Partisan Review at the end of 1943, and to launch Politics as a vehicle for his antiwar, pacifist, "third way" perspectives, arising from the belief that the developing crises would trigger soon or late an international worker's movement, socialist in form, equally bent on sweeping away both the capitalist status quo in the west and the Communist dictatorship usurping the revolutionary birthright in the Russian sphere.

== Allied conduct of the Second World War ==
As a self-described pacifist and opponent of American entry into the Second World War, Macdonald in the early numbers of his magazine tracking the final year and a half of the war found much to criticize: the cynicism of Allied war aims, the bombing of civilian populations, the betrayal by the Russians of the Polish resistance in the wake of the crushing of the Warsaw Ghetto uprising, the internment of Japanese-Americans, racial segregation in the American armed forces, the sentimental belief of the "liblabs" – Macdonald's term of parodist art for the broad liberal and labor coalition across the Democratic party and the left intelligentsia – that the winning of the war would issue in the triumph of the "Common Man" and a "More Abundant Future for All" (parodic scare-capitals were among Macdonald's standard craftsman's tools), and the punitive ascription of collective guilt to civilian populations for the crimes and war policies of the governments to which they were subject.

=== Collective guilt ===
In a signature essay in the March 1945 issue of Politics, "The Responsibility of Peoples", also issued as a pamphlet, Macdonald took up this latter subject at great length, and extended into follow-up debates in the issues for May 1945 and July 1945.

In an editorial item in Politics for April of that year, Macdonald took aim at the collective-guilt mentality as embodied in one of his favorite targets among liberal intellectuals, from which the passage below affords a prime sample of his wry, satiric style:

"The German people have let Max Lerner down. There is no other way to put it--they have failed him and damn near busted his big progressive heart. It seems that Lerner, all dressed up in his War Correspondent's Uniform (see cut), was scooting along behind the advancing Ninth Army in his jeep when he came across a large group of German civilians. 'It was a drizzly afternoon,' he writes (P.M., March 4), 'and they were clustered under a cement shed open at one end. There was a woman with a several-weeks old baby, and there was an old man of 87. Most were men and women in their middle 40's and above, with a scattering of children. They were almost all farmers.' They had been hiding in cellars for three days while American guns destroyed their village in the course of 'the war that they themselves had brought on.' (How 'they themselves had brought it on' not specified.)

"Descending from his jeep, Lerner asked them: Are You Guilty? He records no reply from the baby, but the others answer that they had never trusted or liked Hitler, that they had always considered the Nazis criminals, and that they were Catholics and hence opposed for religious reasons to Hitler's policies. Why then, asks Lerner with that imploacable logic he shows when he is baiting some one who can’t hit back, Why then did you allow the Nazis to do these things? 'With one accord they answered that they had yielded to force and to force alone. But this doesn’t go down with Lerner; he points out to the shivering, bomb-dazed farmers that the people of France, Belgium, Poland, and Russia didn’t yield to German force; so why did they?* *[According to reliable sources, the above countries were all engaged in a war against Germany.] This was a blockbuster: 'They were silent.' (Different interpretations might be put on this silence.) Even after this, some of these simple peasants apparently didn’t understand the kind of animal they were dealing with (see cut); they had been accustomed, after all, to the civilized society of hogs. So they asked Lerner to put in a good word for their local police chief, who had used his official post (probably at the risk of his neck) 'to shield them from the severity of the Nazi regime.' We will omit Lerner's reaction to that one.

"'I came away heartsick and discouraged,' writes Lerner. The crime of these people was cowardice and moral callousness rather than active criminality.... Nowhere did I find the moral strength to face the fact of guilt. Only protests that they were not responsible for what had happened.' Even the baby apparently lacked a sense of responsibility for Hitler, which shows how deeply ingrained this moral callousness is in the German national character.

"However, Lerner thinks there may be 'better material among workers than among the farmers and middle-class.' (You can’t keep a P.M. editor discouraged for long.)..."

==== Japanophobia and the military mind ====
Other ongoing interventions by Macdonald calling attention to the divers attributions of collective guilt to enemy civilians during wartime, if on rather a more exalted register of jingoist bloodthirstiness, included an essay, "My Favorite General", whose treatment of its iconic lead subject -

"My favorite general is George S. Patton Jr. Some of our generals, like Stilwell, have developed a sly ability to simulate human beings. But Patton always behaves as a general should. ... He writes bloodcurdling poetry apostrophizing the God of Battles. He slaps shell-shocked soldiers and curses them for cowards. When Italian mules obstruct the progress of his staff car, he has them executed on the spot ... He wears special uniforms, which, like Goering, he designs himself and which are calculated, like the ox horns worn by ancient Gothic chieftains, to strike terror into the enemy (and into any rational person, for that matter.)"

preceded a report of an off-the-record dinner speech to Washington newspapermen by Navy Admiral William F. "Bull" Halsey, from which one characteristic passage,

"I hate Japs! I'm telling you men, that if I met a pregnant Japanese woman, I'd kick her in the belly!"

led Macdonald to note that

"Bull is a top-ranking naval officer, which gives him the privilege of talking in public in a way which would get civilians locked up in the violent ward of Bellevue. ... A few more such generals and admirals, and militarism will be a dead issue in this country."

In responding two months later to letters from two soldiers – one of whom signed himself "A DISGUSTED MEMBER OF OUR ARMED FORCES." – defending the motivational tactics of Patton and Halsey, Macdonald clarified his views in noting that

. . . These apologies for Patton are based on two arguments:

(1) The war was a just one; therefore, it had to be won; to win it, good generals are needed; Patton is a good general; therefore, Patton is justified. (2) Army life is radically different from civilian life; therefore, it is foolish to criticise its values from a civilian standpoint. Both arguments raise the problem of means and ends.

(1)I never thought World War II was a just war. But accepting this premise for the sake of argument, I'd say that far from the justness of the war excusing Patton's barbarism, Patton's barbarism calls into question the justness of the war. There is something suspect about an end which calls for such means. As I have noted before, Patton is my favorite general because he expresses so naively the real nature of World War II.

(2) That life in the U.S. Army is more brutal and inhumane than civilian life is true, but this fact would seem to be something to be criticised and changed rather than accepted as a law of nature. If it cannot be changed, then, if we are serious about our humane values, we must reject the war which requires such instruments to achieve its ends. Also: my correspondents would wall off military from civilian society, whereas I would do just the opposite: extend civilian values throughout the armed forces. What is actually taking place is, of course, something worse than either of these alternatives: a breaking down, indeed, of the wall between military and civil society, but in the sense that the former is reshaping the latter.

=== Conscientious objection ===
Given his pacifist sympathies during the war, it was natural for Macdonald to run many essays from and about conscientious objectors (C.O.s), with whose position he sympathized, but whose common preference for reassignment to civilian over military-support work he did not reflexively share – as an egalitarian with revolutionary hopes for the leavening educational function of the man of conscience upon the larger population, soldiers included, he felt that a more direct presence among the armed forces was a constructive means to the desired end, a subject debated at length within the magazine, an above-average proportion of whose readers and contributors were drawn from both the ranks of C.O.s and, given the sheer scale of wartime mobilization, soldiers themselves.

=== Racial segregation, in war and in peace ===
Among the forms of social injustice in and out of uniform to which Politics devoted extended coverage was that of racial segregation, in the regular feature "Free and Equal" and elsewhere. Moral issues aside and assumed, Macdonald in one article questioned the very effectiveness for military ends of racial segregation in the armed services, at a time when it was a common assumption that it was no business of the military, given its overriding mission, to be bothering itself with the advancement of "utopian" social goals scarcely advanced elsewhere in a civilian realm scarcely able itself to boast of a shining record of omnichrome rainbow tolerance. One article on race matters, by Wilfred H. Kerr, co-chairman of the Lynn Committee to Abolish Segregation in the Armed Forces, forecast one ironic effect in the postwar era of race strife, prophesying in its very title, "Negroism: Strange Fruit of Segregation", the eventual rise of Black Power and other forms of black separatism. The African-American writer George S. Schuyler, sometimes called "the black Mencken" after his earlier association with the Baltimore journalist's monthly The American Mercury, contributed an impassioned review of An American Dilemma: The Negro Problem and Modern Democracy, the Swedish scholar Gunnar Myrdal's pathbreaking and exhaustive survey of the current state of the American racial agony.

=== The dropping of the atom bomb ===
The dropping by the Americans of atom bombs upon the Japanese cities of Hiroshima and Nagasaki, as a means of hastening the end of the remaining Pacific front of the Second World War, afforded Macdonald a zero point of the modern condition and a rhetorical crescendo of humanist horror for Politics, in the form of a widely anthologized lead editorial filling the top half of the cover of the issue for August 1945:

"At 9:15 [sic] on the morning of August 6, 1945, an American plane dropped a single bomb on the Japanese city of Hiroshima. Exploding with the force of 20,000 tons of TNT, the bomb destroyed in a twinkling two-thirds of the city, including, presumably, most of the 343,000 human beings who lived there. No warning whatsoever was given. This atrocious action places 'us,' the defenders of civilization, on a moral level with 'them,' the beasts of Maidanek. And 'we,' the American people, are just as much and as little responsible for this horror as 'they,' the German people.

"So much is obvious. But more must be said. For the atomic bomb renders anticlimactical even the ending of the greatest war in history [which seems imminent as this goes to press]. [1] The concepts 'WAR' and 'PROGRESS,' ARE NOW OBSOLETE. Both suggest human aspirations, emotions, aims, consciousness. 'The greatest achievement of organized science in history,' said President Truman after the Hiroshima catastrophe--which it probably was, and so much the worse for organized science. Such 'progress' fills no human needs of either the destroyed or the destroyers. And a war of atomic bombs is not a war. It is a scientific experiment. [2] THE FUTILITY OF MODERN WARFARE SHOULD NOW BE CLEAR. Must we not now conclude, with Simone Weil, that the technical aspect of war today is the evil, regardless of political factors? Can one imagine that the atomic bomb could ever be used 'in a good cause'? Do not such means, instantly, of themselves, corrupt ANY cause? [3] ATOMIC BOMBS ARE THE NATURAL PRODUCT OF THE KIND OF SOCIETY WE HAVE CREATED. They are as easy, normal and unforced an expression of the American Standard of Living as electric iceboxes. We do not dream of a world in which atomic fission will be 'harnessed to constructive ends.' The new energy will be at the service of the rulers; it will change their strength but not their aims. The underlying population should regard this new source of energy with lively interest--the interest of victims. [4] THOSE WHO WIELD SUCH DESTRUCTIVE POWER ARE OUTCASTS FROM HUMANITY. They may be gods, they may be brutes, but they are not men. [5] WE MUST 'GET' THE MODERN NATIONAL STATE BEFORE IT 'GETS' US. The crazy and murderous nature of the kind of society we have created is underlined by the atomic bomb. Every individual who wants to save his humanity--and indeed his skin--had better begin thinking 'dangerous thoughts' about sabotage, resistance, rebellion, and the fraternity of all men everywhere. The mental attitude known as 'negativism' is a good start."

Politics was one of several left-wing American publications to condemn the bombing (along with The Progressive, Common Sense and The Militant).

== European intellectuals ==
Given Macdonald's interest in European intellectual life, and his blended interests in both political and literary matters in an age whose own most famous political essayists were among their respective nations' leading literary figures – George Orwell, Albert Camus, Ignazio Silone – it was natural that the onetime Partisan Review veteran Macdonald would feature such writers prominently throughout his controlling tenure atop the masthead of Politics. In addition to contributions from those just mentioned, Macdonald published regular essays and columns by his exiled Italian friends Nicola Chiaromonte and Niccolo Tucci, who were among his most prolific contributors. French intellectuals, often in reprints from native journals, took center stage in a special number from July–August 1947 given over wholly to "French Political Writing," whose stellar roster included Georges Bataille, Camus, Simone de Beauvoir, Maurice Merleau-Ponty, David Rousset, and Jean-Paul Sartre.

== Toward a recovered humanism ==
The accumulated horrors of war – from bureaucratic regimentation of the home front to concentration and death camps, racialist nationalism and genocide, atomic weapons, firebombing of civilian populations, and the replacement as ruling power over Eastern and Central Europe of Hitler's Germany state with Stalinist Russia– combined with the fading of hopes across the anti-Stalinist left for putting into question the nineteenth-century belief in progress that had underwritten the Western intellectual life. As world war gave way to Cold War, a reaction among intellectuals in the West provided regular fare in both some magazines of the day and books pages of the newsweeklies to such pre- and post-Marxist registers of thought as those offered by religion (Niebuhr, Barth, Tillich), existentialism (Camus, Sartre, Jaspers), or both at once (Kierkegaard) .

This postwar turn from the old mechanistic secular faith of Marxism toward renewed ethical, if not always explicitly religious, commitments, took central, watershed root in Politics as well, as the uneasy postwar peace agreements and zoned division of Europe, de-Nazification of German elites and war-crimes trials cemented the Allied victory after the summer of 1945. In the magazine's April 1946 number, Macdonald published the inaugural version of one of his signature essays, "The Root is Man", whose widely reprinted book version from seven years later would eventually find its way almost fifty years later on the lists of an American publisher specializing in anarchist and other forms of radical literature. The inauguration of a regular department in the magazine, "New Roads", heralded the quest formally, as did a regular feature devoted to "Ancestors" from across the ranks of assorted pre-20th century anarchists (P. J. Proudhon),

"EDITOR'S NOTE: This is the first of a series of articles by and about such political thinkers of the past as Diderot, Condorcet, Tom Paine, Saint-Simon, Charles Fourier, Alexander Herzen, Kropotkin, Tolstoy, Daniel De Leon, and Rosa Luxemburg. The names, it will be noted, are mostly of non-Marxists. This is because (1) Marxism is already widely familiar to American intellectuals (perhaps disproportionately so); (2) the contemporary crisis of socialism demands that we supplement and reshape the Marxist heritage with the aid of 'Utopian' socialism; 18th century liberalism, anarchism, and pacifism." social and political philosophers (William Godwin), reformers (Alexander Herzen), and the morally rebellious type among artists (Leo Tolstoy). And in the wake of the assassination in early 1948 of Mohandas Gandhi, Politics devoted a full-court symposium to the life, ideas, and relevance both inspirational and practical of the slain leader of Indian independence, with contributions from James Agee, Nicola Chiaromonte, Paul Goodman, Macdonald, Mary McCarthy, and Niccolo Tucci, followed by copious extracts from Gandhi's own weekly Harijan.

== The counterculture of anarchist humanism: prologue to the 1960s ==
Macdonald's publishing in Politics of some of the earliest essays by the young Columbia-bound sociologist C. Wright Mills and the young novelist, playwright, therapist, and New York social critic Paul Goodman helped seed their rise to national fame twenty years later as two of the signature theorists undergirding the New Left critique of postwar industrial society and mass culture. A debate between Mills and Goodman over the proper locus for the critique of repressive structures in America, with Mills taking a broadly Marxist frame in examining above-ground social structures, and Goodman preferring instead to excavate the post-Freudian unconscious and the repression of instinct, with the social psychology of Karen Horney and Erich Fromm for supporting witness, prefigured the sorts of polemics that would soon crowd the American quality-paperback tables from Ann Arbor to Yale amid the renewal of campus activism and new modes of scholarship. Other harbingers of future cultural ferment may be discerned in a long poem by the English anarcho-pacifist physician Alex Comfort (ascended for all time into the global non-literary firmament since 1972 thanks to The Joy of Sex), an essay by the young San Francisco Beat-affiliated poet Robert Duncan on the internalized repression, thence redirected outward, too often afflicting "The Homosexual in Society", and numerous essays by the Canadian-born London anarchist and conscientious objector George Woodcock, editor at the time of the anarchist cultural quarterly NOW, the raiding of the offices of whose publisher, Freedom Press, during the war by the political arm of the London police he chronicled in a letter to Politics in all its unavoidable irony:

"One of the houses raided was that of a surrealist not even directly connected with the anarchist movement. The day after the raid a Special Branch detective appeared to say that he had always been interested in surrealism, and would like to join the surrealist movement!"

And twenty years before his ideas on the "global village", the Canadian media theorist Marshall McLuhan weighed in as a contributor to Politics with a discussion of the problems of women in modern bureaucratic society.

== Counteracting the Soviet myth ==
With the grim consolidation of Stalinist rule in Eastern Europe in the aftermath of the Second World War, and the ensnaring of a large part of the younger generation on the left by the Henry Wallace movement and what he felt to be common notions within of either a moral equivalence between Russia and the west, or an outright tipping of the moral scales in favor of the Soviet side, Macdonald, while still claiming adherence to the anarchist and pacifist labels, and upon re-immersion in the vast literature on recent Communist history, devoted a large opening section of the Winter 1948 number of Politics to the attempt to counteract the Soviet myth, among whose articles he included an extensive reading list of standard works chronicling forced labor in the Soviet Union, the Moscow trials, the Ukrainian famine of 1932–33, dating back to the early critiques of the Bolshevik experiment in its infancy published by the anarchist Emma Goldman and the eminent English philosopher Bertrand Russell. In the sphere of foreign and military policy in the developing Cold War, though the range of perspectives Macdonald published naturally did not include pro-Soviet or fellow-traveling writers, he did publish those advocating that the United States take the first, unilateral step toward an eventual mutual disarmament, in the belief the Soviets, assured of the good faith of their ostensibly stronger adversary, would be moved to follow suit. Within the same symposium, Macdonald included a detailed response from the Deweyite pragmatist philosopher and militantly anti-Soviet social democrat, Sidney Hook:

"Messrs. Daniel and Squires are naive. The political kernel of their proposal is their hope that if the United States destroys its atomic bombs and plants, Stalin will be ashamed of himself and abandon his dictatorship ... I am not in favor of a preventive war because I am as confident as one can be in human affairs that so long as Stalin fears he will be blasted off the face of the earth once he strikes against the West, he will wait. We can see to it that he is never free of that fear. Even less than the romantic Hitler has he the demonic desire to bring the world down on him in a universal ruin."

Macdonald would travel in Hook's orbit the next decade, which saw him serve for a year as associate editor of the London-based monthly Encounter, founded in 1953 by the Congress for Cultural Freedom, whose own founding in Paris in 1950, with Hook among its leading intellectual lights, he prophesied at the end of the same essay:

"I speak in the first person only for purposes of expository emphasis. Give me a hundred million dollars and a thousand dedicated people, and I will guarantee to generate such a wave of democratic unrest among the masses—yes, even among the soldiers—of Stalin's own empire, that all of his problems for a long time to come will be internal. I can find the people. . . ."

=== The Henry Wallace campaign and "Wallese" ===
One natural cognate of Macdonald's status as a fiercely anti-Stalinist leftist lay in his ongoing critical attention to Henry Wallace, the final vice president (1941–1945) under Franklin Roosevelt whose tenure thus was bookended by respective terms heading up the Departments of Agriculture (1933–1940 and Commerce (1945–1946), followed by his nomination in 1948 atop the presidential ticket of the Progressive Party, who Macdonald saw as afflicted by a dangerously credulous and whitewashing attitude toward Stalinist Russia, along with a general-purpose timid banality and penchant for wooly idealist rhetoric divorced from concrete reality. Macdonald devoted the opening sections of the issue of Politics for March 1947 to an extended look at Wallace, along with an "Autopsy" of the Wallace campaign after the 1948 election. From "The Wallace Myth" from March 1947:

"Wallaceland is the mental habitat of Henry Wallace plus few hundred thousand regular readers of The New Republic, The Nation, and PM. It is a region of perpetual fogs, caused by the warm winds of the liberal Gulf Stream coming in contact with the Soviet glacier. Its natives speak 'Wallese', a debased provincial dialect.

"Wallese is as rigidly formalized as Mandarin Chinese. The Good people are described by ritualistic adjectives: 'forward-looking', 'freedom-loving', 'clear-thinking', and, of course, 'democratic' and 'progressive.' The Bad people are always 'reactionaries' or 'red-baiters'; there are surprisingly few of them, considering the power they wield, and they are perversely wicked, since their real interests would best be served by the Progressive and Realistic policies favored by the Good people. Wallese is always employed to Unite rather than to Divide (hence the fog), and to Further Positive, Constructive Aims rather than Merely to Engage in Irresponsible and Destructive Criticism. As George F. Babbitt of Zenith City, who had his own brand of Wallese in the twenties, used to say: It's Easy Enough to Criticise! There are other conventions in Wallese. Issues are always Clarified, Events invariably Exert Pressure, Problems are Faced (good) or Not Faced (bad), and the World is either On the March (good) or At the Crossroads (neutral) or Facing a Crisis (bad). No article may be composed in Wallese unless it includes at least one of the following terms: 'grass roots', 'integration', 'horizon', 'general welfare.' The frequent use of the 'should and will' or 'can and must' construction is also obligatory, as in the (imaginary) sentence: 'The American people can and must free the forward march of technology from the dead hand of monopoly.' The adjective 'new' is much used, as: 'new horizons', 'new frontiers', and 'the new democracy' (which means the old democracy minus all democratic elements). Like 'adventure', another important word in Wallese,* *[Cf. Wallace's 'the adventure of the Hebrew prophets', which sounds more like Edgar than Henry.] it suggests something Different (and God knows we're sick of what we've got now), Positive, Exciting—something to which the old critical categories, which have proved so lethal in the hands of Irresponsible and Destructive critics, cannot be applied. Thus many of us are by now somewhat leery of both democracy and The New Republic, but how about the new democracy and the new New Republic? Perhaps the greatest sentence ever composed in Wallese is the following, from the hand of the master himself: 'New frontiers beckon with meaningful adventure.'"

== Culture, high, middlebrow and mass ==
As the 2011 reissue by New York Review Books Classics of his signature 1950s cultural essays, Masscult and Midcult: Essays Against the American Grain (most originally gathered in 1962 as Against the American Grain: Essays on the Effects of Mass Culture), may indicate, the phase of the career of Dwight Macdonald best known to the educated public came with his arrival in 1952 as critic on the staff of The New Yorker, there to assay with dialectical scalpel at the ready such characteristic products of postwar aspirational "middlebrow" – or "Midcult" to Macdonald – culture as the Great Books of the Western World book-sets, the Revised Standard Version translation of the Bible, the latter-day age-of-science penchant for facts over interpretative general ideas, and that hardiest of evergreens in the groves of the American book market, the how-to book. It was in Politics, though, if not surprisingly, that Macdonald provided himself with a premonitory sounding board for such preoccupations, in and out of his regular roundup "Popular Culture", one of whose items also hints at Macdonald's dawn-to-decadence penchant for connecting the evolution of cultural forms to that of the stages of industrial development from which they issue:

Whatever Became of Addison Sims?
The kind of question it might be fruitful to answer is: why was self-education so much more popular several generations ago than it seems to be now? Pelmanism, Chatauqua, the Harvard Classics ('Fifteen Minutes a Day'), the International Correspondence Schools, the Roth Memory Course ('Why of course I remember you--Mr. Addison Sims of Seattle!'), Cooper Union--these have become innocent archaisms. At the turn of the century, book agents roamed the country ringing doorbells and selling sets of 'standard authors' (Dickens, Thackeray, George Eliot) encyclopedias and multi-volume historical works. The book-agent has vanished; people read for amusement, not instruction, and authors are no longer 'standard' or sold in sets. Does all this perhaps show the growth of a popular instinct that education is not the golden key to progress which the Victorians thought it was? Is the myth of the self-made man fading? Is the modern world at once so irrational and so totally organized that the mass-man simply gives up, no longer hoping to understand or 'improve' his situation?

A study of self-education in the last fifty years might be a good way to answer such questions--as Orwell in his 'Ethics of the Detective Story' (POLITICS, November 1944) was able to trace in that field the deterioration of ethical standards during the same period. I can't help feeling that American critics might more profitably concern themselves with such rich and relatively unexplored areas than with trying to find something new to say about Henry James."

== Publishing and circulation ==
As is proverbial among small-circulation journals of intellectual opinion, the finances of Politics ran at a deficit, much of it covered by Macdonald's first wife the former Nancy Rodman (m. 1934), sister of the poet, editor and author Selden Rodman, and the beneficiary on her mother's side of an ample trust fund; also proverbially among such magazines, circulation tended toward the 5,000 (c. 60 percent subscription, 40 percent newsstand) mark. Macdonald changed its original monthly frequency to quarterly early in its fourth year of six, and acknowledged in an aside to subscribers his awareness of its chronic scheduling delays in a rueful aside in the issue for (in the best of all intended worlds) Summer 1948:

Note

For reasons not unconnected with the postal regulations governing second-class matter, the present issue, which appears early in November, is officially styled the Summer issue. The Editor extends his customary regrets, apologies and condolences to the readers.

Nancy's humanitarian and philanthropic background played a key role in an ongoing project of the magazine after the war, that of "Packages Abroad", by which regular appeals to readers, channeled directly or through such standard relief agencies as CARE, enabled the donation of food, clothing, shoes and coal for heating to thousands of individuals and families across war-ravaged Europe deprived of them.

== Reception and influence ==
In his column in the left-wing London Tribune, George Orwell wrote favorably of Politics, as reprinted in a subscription advertisement in the latter paper in August, 1944: "One cannot buy magazines from abroad nowadays, but I recommend anyone who has a friend in New York to try and cadge a copy of Politics, the new monthly magazine edited by the Marxist literary critic, Dwight Macdonald. I don’t agree with the policy of this paper, which is anti-war (not from a pacifist angle), but I admire its combination of highbrow political analysis with intelligent literary criticism... Politically, the paper in this country most nearly corresponding to Politics would be, I suppose, The New Leader. You have only to compare the get-up, the style of writing, the range of subjects, and the intellectual level of the two papers, to see what it means to live in a country where there are still leisure and wood-pulp." In her preface to a 1968 reissue of the full run of Politics, the eminent German-American political theorist Hannah Arendt asserted that

"When I was asked to write a brief introduction to the reprint edition of Politics I was tempted to yield to the rather pleasant melancholy of "once upon a time" and to indulge in the nostalgic contemplation that seems to be the appropriate mood for all recollection. Now that I have carefully reread the forty-two issues which appeared from 1944 to 1949—more carefully, I am sure, than I read them more than twenty years ago—this mood has vanished for the simple reason that so many of its articles, comments, and factual reports read as though they were written today or yesterday or yesteryear, except that the concerns and perplexities of a little magazine with a peak circulation of not much more than 5,000 have become the daily bread of newspapers and periodicals with mass circulation. For the issues, far from being outdated, let alone resolved, by the enormous changes in our everyday world, have only increased in urgency."

The Polish poet and 1980 Nobelist in Literature, Czesław Miłosz, whose renowned 1953 essay collection The Captive Mind, amplified a number of Macdonald's own themes regarding the effect of Stalinism on the European mind, found in Macdonald's own independent, anti-authoritarian ethical humanism much to admire, seeing in him a successor to "Thoreau, Whitman, and Melville ... a totally American phenomenon--the completely free man, capable of making decisions at all times and about all things strictly according to his personal moral judgment." Macdonald's friend the Hungarian-born American historian John Lukacs, like Macdonald a cultural traditionalist equally critical of standard-issue American politics either right-wing or pas d'ennemi à gauche progressive, in the Jesuit weekly America in 1958 christened him an "American Orwell", as John Rodden indicates:

"Noting that Macdonald's American 'reputation is rising,' Lukacs wrote that he was already known among British intellectuals 'as one of the most interesting American critics of these times.' In particular Lukacs lauded Macdonald's 'lonely and courageous positions' in the mid-1940s -- on Yalta, the Allied insistence on unconditional surrender, the mistreatment of Japanese-Americans -- and argued that Macdonald's political stance 'coincides with the often lonely positions taken by George Orwell amidst the leftist intelligentsia in Britain.'"

Along with the prominence among leading social critics of the 1960s of such early contributors to Politics as Paul Goodman and C. Wright Mills, and Macdonald's role among the founding circle of Europhile New York literary and political intellectuals who wrote for the influential biweekly New York Review of Books (1963-), a mainstay of postwar intellectual life, among which Macdonald's impassioned critiques of Lyndon Johnson and American policy in Vietnam renewed his role as Second World War gadfly, mention might be made of such long-running little magazines founded in the wake of Politics as MANAS (1948–88), a one-man weekly edited by Henry Geiger, a Los Angeles Theosophist, Indophile, commercial printer and Second World War C.O. indebted to the social philosophies of Mohandas Gandhi, Henry David Thoreau, Leo Tolstoy and Ortega y Gasset, and who published the 1953 pamphlet revision of Macdonald's The Root is Man; and Dissent (1954-), the quarterly founded by early Politics contributor Irving Howe, a leading anti-Stalinist democratic socialist whose equal prominence as a critic of modern European literature found its cognate in Dissent in the prominent space devoted, much after the precedent of Politics, to Continental thinkers and social developments. Chris Hedges recounts the story of Noam Chomsky reading at least most of all volumes of Politics, in Chomsky's youth.

== Notable contributors ==
The following is a selected list of notable contributors to Politics, including those who wrote for it at least 3 times:

- Lionel Abel (1)
- James Agee (2)
- Milton Babbitt (1)
- George Barbarow (7)
- Georges Bataille (1)
- Bruno Bettelheim (3)
- Don Calhoun (5)
- Albert Camus (1)
- Nicola Chiaromonte (6)
- Louis Clair (5)
- Alex Comfort (1)
- Helen Constas (3)
- Simone de Beauvoir (1)
- Theodore Dryden (5)
- Robert Duncan (1)
- James T. Farrell (1)
- Nathan Glazer (2)
- William Godwin (1)
- Ethel Goldwater (5)
- Paul Goodman (8)
- Oscar Handlin (1)
- Will Herberg (1)
- Richard Hofstadter (1)
- Sidney Hook (1)
- Irving Howe (1)
- Abba P. Lerner (2)
- Dwight Macdonald (37)
- Nancy Macdonald (4)
- Frank Marquart (3)
- Mary McCarthy (2)
- Marshall McLuhan (1)
- Maurice Merleau-Ponty (1)
- C. Wright Mills (2)
- Marianne Moore (1)
- A.J. Muste (1)
- Nicolas Nabokov (1)
- Walter J. Oakes (3)
- George Orwell (2)
- P.J. Proudhon (1)
- David Rousset (1)
- Jean-Paul Sartre (1)
- George S. Schuyler (1)
- Victor Serge (2)
- Kenneth M. Stampp (1)
- Harvey Swados (1)
- Leo Tolstoy (2)
- Niccolo Tucci (13)
- Max Weber (1)
- Simone Weil (2)
- Joseph Weizenbaum (1)
- Bertram D. Wolfe (1)
- George Woodcock (8)

== See also ==
- Bibliography of George Orwell
