= Memories of a Catholic Girlhood =

1957 autobiography by Mary McCarthy

Memories of a Catholic Girlhood is the autobiography of Mary McCarthy that was published in 1957. The book chronicles McCarthy's childhood including her being orphaned, having an abusive great uncle, and losing her Catholic faith. In the book McCarthy gives details at the end of each chapter that other family members claim do not correspond with their memory of events.

== Publication data ==
- Memories of a Catholic Girlhood, 1957, Harvest/HBJ, 1972 reprint:ISBN 0-15-658650-9
