= Mary McCarthy (American writer) =

American novelist and political activist (1912–1989)

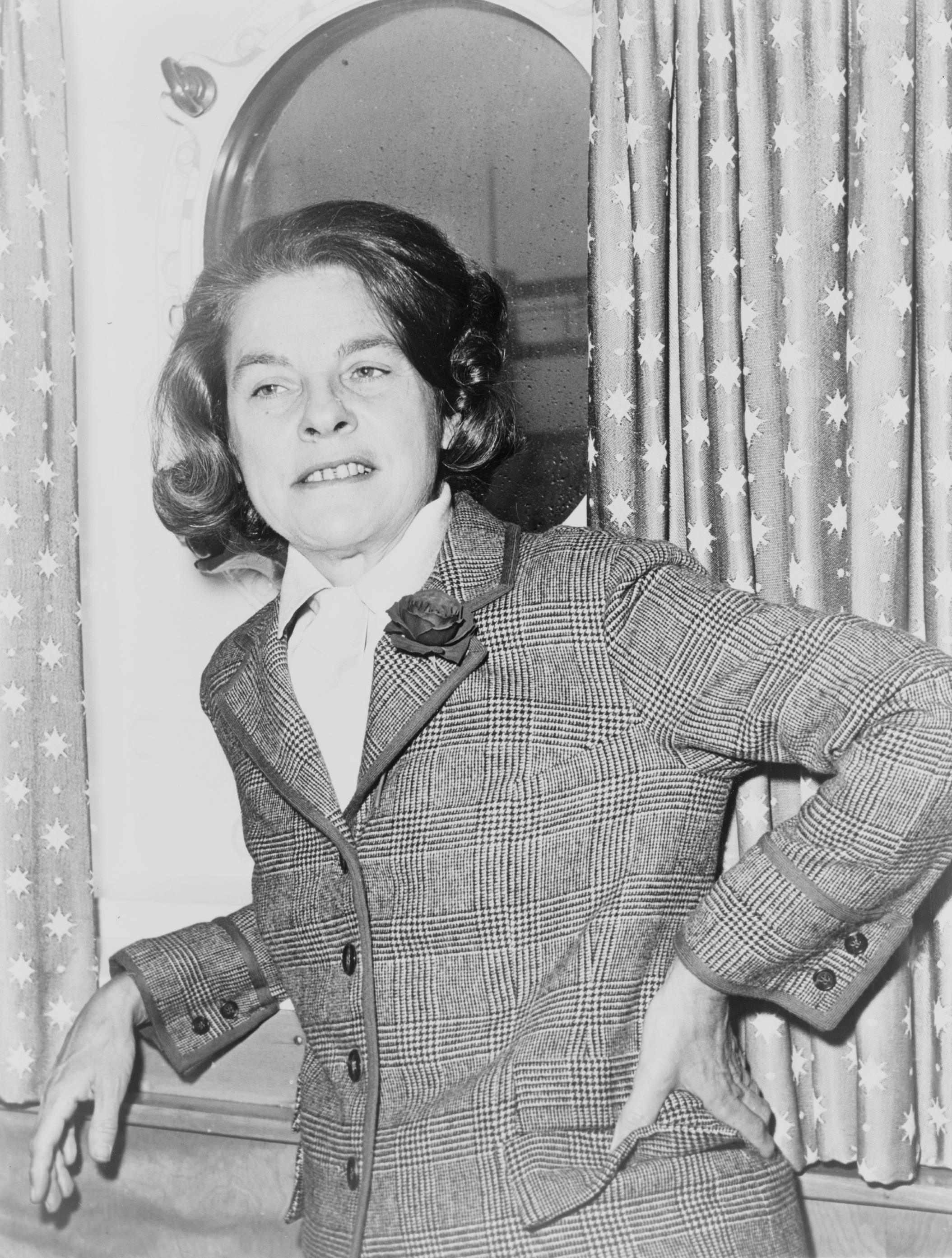
- McCarthy in 1963
- Born: Mary Therese McCarthy; June 21, 1912; Seattle, Washington, U.S.
- Died: October 25, 1989 (aged 77); New York City, U.S.
- Education: Vassar College (BA)
- Occupations: Novelist; critic; political activist
- Spouses: Harald Johnsrud (m. 1933; div. 1936) Edmund Wilson (m. 1938; div. 1946) Bowden Broadwater (m. 1946) James West (m. 1961)
- Children: 1
- Relatives: Kevin McCarthy (brother)
- Writing career
- Notable awards: American Academy of Arts and Letters (1960); Edward MacDowell Medal (1984); National Medal for Literature (1984)

Mary Therese McCarthy (June 21, 1912 – October 25, 1989) was an American novelist, critic and political activist, best known for her novel The Group, her marriage to critic Edmund Wilson, her intimate friendship with her colleague Hannah Arendt and her storied feud with playwright Lillian Hellman. McCarthy was the winner of the Horizon Prize in 1949 and was awarded two Guggenheim Fellowships, in 1949 and 1959. She was a member of the National Institute of Arts and Letters and the American Academy in Rome. In 1973, she delivered the Huizinga Lecture in Leiden, the Netherlands, under the title Can There Be a Gothic Literature? The same year she was elected a Fellow of the American Academy of Arts and Sciences. She won the National Medal for Literature and the Edward MacDowell Medal in 1984. McCarthy held honorary degrees from Bard, Bowdoin, Colby, Smith College, Syracuse University, the University of Maine at Orono, the University of Aberdeen, and the University of Hull.

== Early life and education ==
Born on June 21, 1912 in Seattle, Washington to Roy Winfield McCarthy and his wife Martha Therese (née Preston), McCarthy and her three brothers were orphaned when both their parents died in the flu epidemic of 1918. She and her brothers, Kevin, Preston and Sheridan, were raised in very unhappy circumstances by her father's Irish Catholic parents in Minneapolis, Minnesota, and under the direct care of an uncle and aunt, whom she remembered for harsh treatment and abuse.

When the situation became intolerable, McCarthy was taken in by her maternal grandparents in Seattle. Her maternal grandmother, Augusta Morganstern, was Jewish, and her maternal grandfather, Harold Preston, a prominent attorney and co-founder of the law firm Preston Gates & Ellis, was Presbyterian. Her brothers were sent to boarding school.

McCarthy credited her grandfather, who helped draft one of the nation's first Workmen's Compensation Acts, with helping form her liberal views. McCarthy explores the complex events of her early life in Minneapolis and her coming-of-age in Seattle in her memoirs, Memories of a Catholic Girlhood and How I Grew. Her younger brother, Kevin McCarthy, became an actor and starred in motion pictures Death of a Salesman (1951) and Invasion of the Body Snatchers (1956).

Under the guardianship of the Prestons, McCarthy studied at the Convent of the Sacred Heart - Forest Ridge in Seattle and Annie Wright Seminary in Tacoma. She attended Vassar College, in Poughkeepsie, New York, where she graduated in 1933 with an Bachelor of Arts cum laude and was elected to Phi Beta Kappa.

== Career and public life ==
McCarthy's debut novel, The Company She Keeps, received critical acclaim as a succès de scandale, depicting the social milieu of New York intellectuals of the late 1930s with unreserved frankness. It includes her celebrated short story "The Man in the Brooks Brothers Shirt" which Partisan Review published in 1941. It recounts the sexual encounter of a young bohemian intellectual woman and a middle-aged businessman encountered in the club car of a train. Although she finds him fat and grey, she is intrigued by his elegant Brooks Brothers shirts and his knowledge of literary figures. The story depicts—shockingly for the literary fiction of the era—not only the act of a woman choosing to engage in casual sex with a complete stranger but, more importantly, how that act is rooted in the complexity of her character.

After building a reputation as a satirist and critic, McCarthy enjoyed popular success when the 1963 edition of her novel The Group remained on the New York Times Best Seller list for almost two years. Her work is noted for its precise prose and its complex mixture of autobiography and fiction.

Randall Jarrell's 1954 novel Pictures from an Institution is said to be about McCarthy's year teaching at Sarah Lawrence.

McCarthy's feud with fellow writer Lillian Hellman formed the basis for the play Imaginary Friends by Nora Ephron. Their feud began in the late 1930s over ideological differences, and was rooted in McCarthy's belief in the innocence of the defendants in the Moscow Trials during the Great Purge and Hellman's support for Soviet Premier Joseph Stalin. McCarthy further provoked Hellman in 1979, when she said on The Dick Cavett Show: "every word [Hellman] writes is a lie, including 'and' and 'the'." Hellman responded with a $2.5 million lawsuit against McCarthy for libel. Observers of the trial noted the irony of Hellman's lawsuit as it brought scrutiny resulting in a serious decline in her reputation as McCarthy and her supporters worked to prove that Hellman had lied. The case was dropped shortly after Hellman died in 1984.

Although McCarthy broke ranks with some of her Partisan Review colleagues when they swerved toward conservative politics after World War II, she carried on lifelong friendships with Dwight Macdonald, Nicola Chiaromonte, Philip Rahv, F. W. Dupee and Elizabeth Hardwick. Perhaps most prized of all was her close friendship with Hannah Arendt, with whom she maintained a sizable correspondence widely regarded for its intellectual rigor. After Arendt's passing, McCarthy became Arendt's literary executor, serving from 1976 until her own death in 1989. As executor, McCarthy prepared Arendt's unfinished manuscript The Life of the Mind for publication. McCarthy taught at Bard College from 1946 to 1947, and again between 1986 and 1989. She also taught a winter semester in 1948 at Sarah Lawrence College.

== Ideology ==
McCarthy left the Catholic Church as a young woman, becoming an atheist.

In New York, she moved in "fellow-traveling" Communist circles early in the 1930s, but by the latter half of the decade she had sided firmly with the anti-Stalinist Left. She accordingly expressed solidarity with Leon Trotsky and his followers after the witch hunt targeting them culminated in the Moscow Trials. McCarthy also vigorously countered playwrights and authors she considered to be adherents of Stalinism.

=== Opposition to Vietnam War ===
In 1967 and 1968, McCarthy travelled to North and South Vietnam, to report on the war from an anti-war perspective. She documented her observations in two books: Vietnam and Hanoi.

Interviewed after her first trip, she declared on British television that there was not a single documented case of the Viet Cong deliberately killing a South Vietnamese woman or child. She wrote favorably about the Viet Cong.

McCarthy visited North Vietnam in March 1968, only a month after the Tet Offensive created havoc in South Vietnam. In her book, Hanoi, McCarthy provides a rare English-language description of life in North Vietnam during the war. McCarthy describes an orderly society, in which everyone pitched in to help with the war effort. North Vietnam received advance warning of most bombing attacks and McCarthy regularly had to take cover from American bombs.

McCarthy's visits to Vietnam were controversial. During her visit to North Vietnam, she met briefly with U.S. Air Force officer James Risner, who was being held as a prisoner of war by North Vietnam. Years later, after his release, Risner attacked McCarthy for her not having recognized that he had been tortured by the North Vietnamese while in custody.

== Personal life ==
McCarthy married four times. In 1933, she married Harald Johnsrud, an actor and playwright. She and critic Philip Rahv were lovers. Her best-known spouse was her second husband, writer and critic Edmund Wilson, whom she married in 1938 after leaving Rahv. They had a son, Reuel Wilson. McCarthy and Wilson divorced in 1946. Later that year, she married Bowden Broadwater, who worked for The New Yorker. They also divorced.

In 1961, McCarthy married career diplomat James R. West.

McCarthy died of lung cancer on October 25, 1989, at NewYork-Presbyterian Hospital in New York City.

== Film portrayals ==
In the 2012 German movie Hannah Arendt, Mary McCarthy is portrayed by Janet McTeer.

== Selected works ==
=== Novels ===
- The Company She Keeps (Simon & Schuster, 1942)
- The Oasis (Random House, 1949)
- The Groves of Academe (Harcourt, Brace, 1952)
- A Charmed Life (Harcourt, Brace, 1955)
- The Group (Harcourt, Brace & World, 1963)
- Birds of America (Harcourt Brace Jovanovich, 1971)
- Cannibals and Missionaries (Harcourt Brace Jovanovich, 1979)

=== Stories ===
- Cast a Cold Eye (Harcourt, Brace, 1950)
- The Hounds of Summer and Other Stories (Avon, 1981)

=== Memoirs ===
- Memories of a Catholic Girlhood (Harcourt, Brace, 1957)
- How I Grew (Harcourt Brace Jovanovich, 1987)
- Intellectual Memoirs: New York 1936–1938 (Harcourt Brace Jovanovich, 1992)

=== Essays, Criticism, Journalism & Nonfiction ===
- Sights and Spectacles: 1937–1956 (Farrar, Straus & Cudahy, 1956)
- Venice Observed (Bernier/Reynal, 1957)
- The Stones of Florence (Harcourt, Brace, 1959)
- On the Contrary: Articles of Belief, 1946-1961 (Farrar, Straus & Cudahy, 1961)
- Vietnam (Harcourt, Brace & World, 1967)
- Hanoi (Harcourt, Brace & World, 1968)
- The Writing on the Wall and Other Literary Essays (Harcourt, Brace & World, 1970)
- Medina (Harcourt Brace Jovanovich, 1972)
- The Mask of State: Watergate Portraits (Harcourt Brace Jovanovich, 1974)
- Ideas and the Novel (Harcourt Brace Jovanovich, 1980)
- Occasional Prose (Harcourt Brace Jovanovich, 1985)
- A Bolt from the Blue and Other Essays (New York Review, 2002)

=== Books about McCarthy ===
- Sam Reese, The Short Story in Midcentury America: Countercultural Form in the Work of Bowles, McCarthy, Welty, and Williams, (2017), Louisiana State University Press, ISBN 9780807165768
- Sabrina Fuchs Abrams, Mary McCarthy: Gender, Politics, And The Postwar Intellectual, (2004), Peter Lang Publishing, ISBN 0-8204-6807-X
- Eve Stwertka (editor), Twenty-Four Ways of Looking at Mary McCarthy: The Writer and Her Work, (1996), Greenwood Press, ISBN 0-313-29776-2
- Carol Brightman (editor), Between Friends: The Correspondence of Hannah Arendt and Mary McCarthy 1949–1975, (1996), Harvest/HBJ, ISBN 0-15-600250-7
- Carol Brightman, Writing Dangerously: Mary McCarthy And Her World, (1992), Harvest Books, ISBN 0-15-600067-9
- Joy Bennet, Mary McCarthy; An Annotated Bibliography, (1992), Garland Press, ISBN 0-8240-7028-3
- Carol Gelderman, Mary McCarthy: A Life, 1990, St Martins Press, ISBN 0-312-00565-2
- Doris Grumbach, The Company She Kept, 1967, Coward-McCann, Inc., LoC CCN: 66-26531,
- Alan Ackerman, Just Words, (2011), Yale University Press, ISBN 978-0-300-16712-2
- Michelle Dean, Sharp: The Women Who Made an Art of Having an Opinion, (2018), Grove Press, ISBN 978-0802125095
- Frances Kiernan, Seeing Mary Plain: A Life of Mary McCarthy, (2000), W. W. Norton & Company, ISBN 0-393-03801-7

=== Films based on her writing ===
- The Group, 1966 film directed by Sidney Lumet, based on McCarthy's novel by that name
- Women & Men: Stories of Seduction, 1990 HBO Films release of a combination of stories, one of which was based on McCarthy's "The Man In The Brooks Brothers Suit"
