= Nicola Chiaromonte =

Italian politician

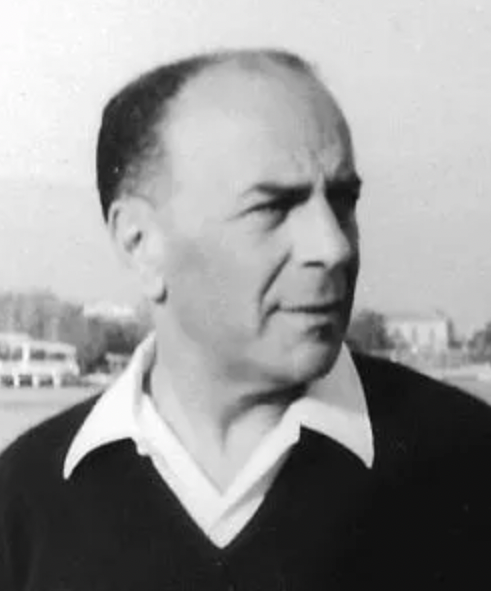
Chiaromonte in 1963

Nicola Chiaromonte (1905 in Rapolla, Potenza – 18 January 1972 in Rome) was an Italian activist and writer. In 1934 he fled Italy for France, after opposing Benito Mussolini's fascist government. In Paris he contributed to Giustizia e Libertà. During the Spanish Civil War, he flew in André Malraux's squadron, fighting against fascist supported General Francisco Franco. The character of Scali in Malraux's novel Man's Hope is based on Chiaromonte. After moving to New York in 1941, he took on an important role in the leftist anti-Stalinist intellectual scene of the period, writing for The Nation, The New Republic, politics and Partisan Review. During the Cold War, he helped found, and served as editor, for the Italian journal Tempo Presente, which was published by the Congress for Cultural Freedom (an organization with silent backing of the Central Intelligence Agency). Mary McCarthy was a close friend during his time in the US. A foreword to the 1985 edition of Chiaromonte's book of essays The Paradox of History (1970) was written by Joseph Frank, a noted Dostoyevsky scholar.

== Works ==
In Italian

- La situazione drammatica (1960)
- Credere e non credere (1971)
- Scritti politici e civili (1976)
- Scritti sul teatro (1976)
- Silenzio e parole (1978)
- Il tarlo della conscienza (1992, introduction by Gustaw Herling-Grudziński)
- Che cosa rimane. Taccuini 1955-1971 (1995, introduction by Wojciech Karpiński)
- Fra me e te la verità, lettere a Muska (2013, afterword by Wojciech Karpiński)(a collection of his letters to Melanie von Nagel, a Benedictine nun)

In English translation

- The Worm of Consciousness and Other Essays (1977) ISBN 978-0-15-698370-9
- The Paradox of History: Stendhal, Tolstoy, Pasternak, and Others (1970) ISBN 978-0-297-00257-4
