= Dwight Macdonald =

American writer (1906–1982)

- Born: March 24, 1906; New York City, New York, US
- Died: December 19, 1982 (aged 76); New York City, New York, US
- Education: Yale University
- Occupations: Writer; author; literary critic; cultural critic; activist
- Years active: 1929–1980
- Political party: Socialist Workers Party (1939–40); Workers' Party (1940–41)
- Movement: New York Intellectuals
- Spouses: Nancy Rodman (m. 1934; div. 1954) Gloria Lanier (m. 1954)
- Children: 2, including Nicholas

Dwight Macdonald (March 24, 1906 – December 19, 1982) was an American writer, critic, philosopher, and activist. Macdonald was a member of the New York Intellectuals and editor of their leftist magazine Partisan Review for six years. He also contributed to other New York publications including Time, The New Yorker, The New York Review of Books, and Politics, a journal which he founded in 1944.

== Early life and career ==
Macdonald was born on the Upper West Side of New York City to Dwight Macdonald Sr. (–1926) and Alice Hedges Macdonald (–1957), a prosperous Protestant family from Brooklyn. Macdonald was educated at the Barnard School, Phillips Exeter Academy and Yale. At university, he was editor of The Yale Record, the student humor magazine. As a student at Yale, he also was a member of Psi Upsilon and his first job was as a trainee executive for Macy's.

In 1929, Macdonald was employed at Time magazine; he had been offered a job by Henry Luce, a fellow Yale alumnus. In 1930, he became the associate editor of Fortune, then a new publication created by Luce. Like many writers on Fortune, his politics were radicalized by the Great Depression. He resigned from the magazine in 1936 over an editorial dispute, when the magazine's executives severely edited the last installment of his extended four-part attack on U.S. Steel.

In 1934, he married Nancy Gardiner Rodman (1910–1996), sister of Selden Rodman and credited as the person who "radicalized" him. He is the father of filmmaker and author Nicholas Macdonald and of Michael Macdonald.

== Editor and writer ==
Macdonald was an editor of the Partisan Review magazine from 1937 to 1943, but in the course of editorial disagreements about the degree, the practice, and the principles of political, cultural, and literary criticism, he quit to establish Politics, a magazine of more outspoken and leftist editorial perspective which he published from 1944 to 1949.

As an editor, he fostered intellectuals (academic and public), such as Lionel Trilling, Mary McCarthy, George Orwell, Bruno Bettelheim, and C. Wright Mills. Besides his editorial work, he also was a staff writer for The New Yorker magazine, from 1952 to 1962 and was the movie critic for Esquire magazine. In the 1960s, the quality of his movie-review work for Esquire granted Macdonald public exposure in the American cultural mainstream as a movie reviewer for The Today Show, a daytime television talk-show program.

== Politics ==
Macdonald was for a period an organized Trotskyist in the Socialist Workers Party. He was part of an opposition grouping to Leon Trotsky which culminated in a split in 1940. His split with Trotskyism, including over the Kronstadt rebellion and the defense of the foundations of the Soviet Union, was part of a generalized break with Marxism.

Macdonald then moved towards democratic socialism. He was opposed to totalitarianism, including fascism and Bolshevism, whose defeat he viewed as necessary to the survival of civilization. He denounced Joseph Stalin for first encouraging the Poles to launch an anti-Nazi insurrection — the Warsaw Uprising (August–October 1944) — and then halting the Red Army at the outskirts of Warsaw to allow the German Army to crush the Poles and kill their leaders, communist and noncommunist.

At the same time, Macdonald was fiercely critical of the illiberal policies that elected democratic governments introduced in the name of opposing fascism and Bolshevism. Over the course of World War II (1939–1945), he suffered from increased fatigue and psychological depression as he observed the progressive horrors of the war, especially the commonplace practice of the bombing of civilian populations and the destruction of entire cities, in particular the fire bombing of Dresden (February 1945), as well as the mistreatment of German civilians. By the war's end, Macdonald's politics had progressed to pacifism and to libertarian socialism.

In that vein, when debating East–West politics with the writer Norman Mailer in 1952, Macdonald said that if absolutely forced to choose a side (which he agreed with Mailer was not necessary in most cases but rather only in a limited number), he would reluctantly side with the Western bloc because he regarded Bolshevism as the greatest single threat to civilization worldwide in the post-war era. In 1953, he publicly restated that pro-West political stance in the revised edition of the essay "The Root is Man" (1946). Nonetheless, in light of the anticommunist witch-hunts that were McCarthyism (1950–1956), he later repudiated such binary politics. In 1955, Macdonald became the associate editor for one year of Encounter magazine, a publication sponsored by the Congress for Cultural Freedom, which was a CIA-funded front organisation meant to ideologically influence and control cultural elites in the Cold War (1945–1991) with the Soviet Union. Macdonald did not know that Encounter magazine was a CIA front, and when he learned the fact he condemned CIA sponsorship of literary publications and organizations. He had also participated in conferences sponsored by the Congress for Cultural Freedom.

== Cultural critic ==
During the late 1950s and the 1960s, Macdonald wrote cultural criticism, especially about the rise of mass media and of middle-brow culture, of mediocrity exemplified; the blandly wholesome worldview of the play Our Town (1938) by Thornton Wilder, the commodified culture of the Great Books of the Western World, and the simplistic language of the Revised Standard Version (1966) of the Bible:

To make the Bible readable in the modern sense means to flatten out, tone down, and convert into tepid expository prose what in [the King James Version] is wild, full of awe, poetic, and passionate. It means stepping down the voltage of the K.J.V. so that it won’t blow any fuses. Babes and sucklings (or infants) can play with the R.S.V. without the slightest danger of electrocution.

His New Yorker review of Webster's Third Edition, published in 1961, became the definitive review for the dictionary's critics. President Kennedy read Macdonald's review of Michael Harrington's book on poverty in the United States, The Other America, as a major factor in the start of Kennedy's plan for a war on poverty, which President Johnson adopted after Kennedy's assassination.

In The New Republic essay "The Browbeater" on 23 November 2011, Franklin Foer accused Macdonald of being a hatchet-man for high culture, going on to say that in his Masscult and Midcult: Against The American Grain (2011), a new edition of Against the American Grain: Essays on the Effects of Mass Culture (1962), Macdonald's cultural criticism "culminated in a plea for highbrows to escape from the mass culture" that dominates the mainstream of American society. Macdonald, Foer suggests, would welcome a time when "highbrows would flee to their own hermetic little world, where they could produce art for one another, while resolutely ignoring the masses."

Cultural critic and historian Louis Menand, writing in The New Yorker, argued that "Macdonald was not a prude. He was not in the business of blaming people for enjoying what they enjoyed or admiring what they admired. His business was getting people to realize that they were often not actually enjoying or benefitting from the cultural goods they had been persuaded to patronize," those cultural goods being what Macdonald labeled "Midcult"—ostensibly "sophisticated" cultural products intended for mass consumption.

In the book Dwight Macdonald on Culture: The Happy Warrior of the Mind, Reconsidered (2013), Tadeusz Lewandowski argued that Macdonald's approach to cultural questions as a public intellectual placed him in the conservative tradition of the British cultural critic Matthew Arnold, of whom he was the literary heir in the 20th century. Previously, in the field of cultural studies Macdonald was placed among the radical traditions of the New York Intellectuals (left-wing anti-Stalinists) and of the Marxist Frankfurt School.

== Political radical renewed ==
As a writer, Macdonald published essays and reviews in The New Yorker and in The New York Review of Books. His most consequential book review for The New Yorker magazine was "Our Invisible Poor" (January 1963), about The Other America (1962) by Michael Harrington, a social-history book that reported and documented the socio-economic inequality and racism experienced by twenty-five percent of the US population. The social historian Maurice Isserman said that the War on Poverty (1964) derived from the Johnson administration's having noticed the sociological report of The Other America by way of Macdonald's book-review essay.

In opposing the Vietnam War (1945–1975), Macdonald defended the constitutional right of American university students to protest the public policies that facilitated that war in Southeast Asia, thus he supported the Columbia University students who organized a sit-in protest meant to halt the university's functions. Yet as a political radical himself in 1968, Macdonald criticized the Students for a Democratic Society (SDS) organization for insufficient ideological commitment, for showing only the red flag of revolution and not the black flag of anarchism, his political taste.

In further action upon his political principles, Macdonald signed his name to the "Writers and Editors War Tax Protest" by which he refused to pay income tax to undermine the financing of the undeclared Vietnam War. Likewise, along with the American public intellectuals Mitchell Goodman, Henry Braun, Denise Levertov, Noam Chomsky, and William Sloane Coffin, Macdonald signed the antiwar manifesto "A Call to Resist Illegitimate Authority" (12 October 1967) and was a member of RESIST, a non-profit organization for coordinating grass-roots political work.

== Anecdotes ==
Macdonald's outspokenness and volubility gained many detractors. "You have nothing to say, only to add," Gore Vidal told him. Leon Trotsky reportedly observed: "Every man has a right to be stupid but comrade Macdonald abuses the privilege." Paul Goodman quipped: "Dwight thinks with his typewriter."

He once notably described his fellow anti-Stalinist Heinrich Blücher as a "true, hopeless anarchist.”

== Selected works ==
- Fascism and the American Scene (Pioneer Publishers, 1938). OCLC 8949059.
- Henry Wallace: The Man and the Myth (New York: The Vanguard Press, 1948)
- The Root Is Man: Two Essays in Politics (1953)
- The Ford Foundation: The Men and the Millions – an Unauthorized Biography (1955)
- The Responsibility of Peoples, and Other Essays in Political Criticism (Westport, Conn.: Greenwood Press, 1957). ISBN 0837174783.
- Memoirs of a Revolutionist: Essays in Political Criticism (1960)
  - Reprinted as Politics Past (1970)
- Parodies: An Anthology from Chaucer to Beerbohm – and After (1960, as editor)
- Albert Camus. Neither Victims nor Executioners (1960, as translator)
- Against The American Grain: Essays on the Effects of Mass Culture (1962)
- Our Invisible Poor. Sidney Hillman Foundation (1963)
- Poems of Edgar Allan Poe (1965, as editor)
- Dwight Macdonald on Movies (1969)
  - Reprinted as On Movies (Da Capo Press, 1981), with a new introduction by John Simon.
- Discriminations: Essays and Afterthoughts 1938–1974 (1974)
- My Past and Thoughts: The Memoirs of Alexander Herzen (1982, as editor)
- Atrocities of the Mind: Essays on Violence and Politics in the American Century (2026) ISBN 9780226847993

== See also ==
- James Agee
- William F. Buckley Jr.
- Noam Chomsky
- F. W. Dupee
- Irving Howe
