= Philip Rahv =

American literary critic (1908–1973)

- Born: Fevel Greenberg; March 10, 1908; Kupin, Russian Empire (modern-day Ukraine)
- Died: December 22, 1973 (aged 65); Cambridge, Massachusetts, U.S.
- Other name: Philip Rann
- Occupations: Literary critic and essayist
- Known for: Co-founder of Partisan Review

Philip Rahv (March 10, 1908 – December 22, 1973) was an American literary critic and essayist. In 1933, he and William Phillips co-founded Partisan Review, one of the most influential literary periodicals in the first half of the twentieth century. Initially affiliated with the Communist Party and adhering to their agenda of proletarian literature, Rahv went on to publish a broad spectrum of modern writers in the pages of his magazine. He was one of the first to introduce Franz Kafka to American readers.

== Life ==
He was born to a Jewish family in Kupin, Russian Empire (in modern-day Ukraine). The family migrated and spent two years in Vienna, where Philip attended the gymnasium. He was born under the name Fevel Greenberg. He made his way to Providence, Rhode Island, with his father and two brothers, Selig and David. He lived for a time in Palestine where his mother chose to live, and worked as a teacher of Hebrew, in Portland, Oregon, from 1928 to 1931. He wrote at first under the name Philip Rann. Then came the modification to "Rahv", which appeared in an essay he published in 1932.

In 1933, Rahv joined the American Communist Party. Partisan Review broke with the Soviet line in 1937 in the wake of the Moscow Trials and maintained an ongoing feud with Stalinist Popular Front advocates such as Granville Hicks of New Masses. He was officially expelled as a Trotskyite by the American Communist Party on October 1, 1937. Rahv taught at Brandeis University in his later years and died in Cambridge, Massachusetts, in 1973.

== Literary career ==
Philip Rahv's writing career began during the Depression. It reflected the prevailing literary currents of Marxism and the rise of proletarian literature. In search of a collective ideology, he and others of his generation rejected the formalism and social disengagement of the great writers of the 1920s. An exception was T. S. Eliot, whose intellectual depth and historic sense Rahv continued to admire, Eliot's increasingly reactionary politics and traditional religiosity notwithstanding. Because Rahv believed the creative contradictions within a writer are the greatest measure of his achievement, he welcomed the opportunity to reconcile Eliot's conservative views with revolutionary ones that his writing also contained.

Rahv's literary influence arose from his role as editor, author, and reviewer for Partisan Review and other magazines including The New York Review of Books. From the start of his writing career, he articulated his key literary values: the need for a synthesis between European and American artistic traditions and between literary modernism and radicalism; the importance of the Marxist dialectic to effectuate such syntheses; the value of cosmopolitanism to promote a broad understanding of the world and the leading ideas of the writer's times; the rejection of parochial ideas based on region, nation, or ethnicity. In one of his most often quoted essays, "Paleface and Redskin", he identified two opposing currents: upper-class palefaces such as Henry James and Nathaniel Hawthorne and uncultured redfaces such as Walt Whitman and Mark Twain. The result was a dichotomy between consciousness and experience and between symbolism and naturalism. Rahv deplored the dichotomy, looking to the future for the kind of synthesis achieved by such European writers as Marcel Proust and Thomas Mann.

Rahv reached the height of his literary influence editing and writing for Partisan Review in the late 1930s. His influence continued through the 1940s with his writings on a wide range of European and American authors, most notably Henry James, whose reputation he contributed to reviving. With the rightward turn of politics in the 1950s, however, he retreated from his earlier literary and political prominence. He played little role in Partisan Review in this era, publishing essays in other publications, most notably The New York Review of Books. In the 1960s his brief enthusiasm for the New Left was followed by disillusionment. He never finished his final project, a book on Fyodor Dostoyevsky.

== Works ==
- Image and Idea (1949) – essays
- The Myth and the Powerhouse (1965) – essays
- Literature and the Sixth Sense (1969) – essays
- Essays in Literature and Politics (1978) – essays
- Modern Occasions, vol 1., 1970–71, issues 1, 2, 3, 4; vol. 2, 1972, issues 1, 2.

== See also ==
- New York Intellectuals
- Anti-Stalinist left

== Bibliography ==
- Bloom, Alexander. Prodigal Sons: the New York Intellectuals & their World. Oxford University Press, 1986. ISBN 978-0-19-505177-3
- Barrett, William. The Truants: Adventures Among the Intellectuals. Anchor Press/Doubleday, 1982. ISBN 0-385-15966-8
- Cooney, Terry A. The Rise of the New York Intellectuals: Partisan Review and Its Circle. University of Wisconsin Press, 1986.
- Dvosin, Andrew J. Literature in a Political World: The Career and Writings of Philip Rahv.. Ph.D. Dissertation, NYU, 1977.
- Hindus, Milton. "Philip Rahv, The Critic". Images and Ideas in American Culture, The Function of Criticism. Essays in Honor of Philip Rahv. ed. Arthur Edelstein. University Press of New England, 1979. 171–203.
- Kadish, Doris. "A Young Communist in Love: Philip Rahv, Partisan Review, and My Mother". The Georgia Review 68, 4 (2014): 768–817.
- Kadish, Doris. The Secular Rabbi: Philip Rahv and Partisan Review. Liverpool University Press, 2021. philiprahv.com
- Klehr, H., Haynes, J. E., Anderson, K. The Soviet World of American Communism. Yale University Press, 1998. ISBN 0300071507
- Laskin, David. Partisans. Simon & Schuster, 2000. ISBN 9780684815657
- Lelchuk, Alan. "The Last Years", in Images and Ideas in American Culture, The Function of Criticism. Essays in Honor of Philip Rahv, ed. Arthur Edelstein. University Press of New England, 1979. 205-19.
- McCarthy, Mary. Intellectual Memoirs, New York 1936–1938. Harcourt Brace, 1992. ISBN 0156447878
- McCarthy, Mary. "Philip Rahv, 1908–1973". New York Times Book Review 17 (February 1974): 1–2.
- Meyers, Jeffrey. "The Transformations of Philip Rahv". Salmagundi (Spring-Summer 2019).
