= Frederick Grubb (poet) =

British poet (1930–2017)

- Born: Frederick Crichton-Stuart Grubb; 18 June 1930; Wiltshire
- Died: 24 May 2017 (aged 86); Hampstead, London
- Education: Haileybury; Trinity College, Cambridge (MA)
- Occupations: Poet, literary critic
- Relatives: John Stuart, 3rd Earl of Bute
- Writing career
- Notable work: A Vision of Reality (1965)
- Movement: The Group

Frederick Grubb (sometimes Fred Grubb) (1930–2017) was an English poet and critic.

== Life ==
=== Early life and education ===
Frederick Crichton-Stuart Grubb was born near Salisbury, Wiltshire, on 18 June 1930 to Sir Kenneth George Grubb and his first wife Eileen Knight. His father was a Christian missionary in South America and worked for the Ministry of Information before being appointed President of the Church Missionary Society (1944–69) and British delegate to the UNESCO General Conference (1954).

Frederick's mother died when he was two. He grew up in Birkenhead and Highgate. He was educated at Haileybury. During his national service in the Highland Light Infantry, which he tried but failed to avoid, he accidentally shot his commanding officer and was transferred to the Education Corps.

He read English at Cambridge, graduating MA in 1960, where he befriended Ted Hughes and attended lectures by F. R. Leavis, whose "dogmatic" teaching-style he disliked. Among his other contemporaries were poets Thom Gunn and Philip Hobsbaum. He later earnt a PhD at the University of London (Westfield College), writing a thesis on "Feeling and Values in the Work of T. S. Eliot" (1971).

=== Career ===
He was a contributor to Cambridge Left, whose former contributors included W. H. Auden, Gavin Ewart and Charles Madge, as well as Donald MacLean and other communists.

Grubb was a member of the Group (a club and loose poetic movement including Philip Hobsbaum, Peter Redgrove, Edward Lucie-Smith and others), and later the Poets' Workshop, where poets discussed one another's writing. In his history of British poetry, Martin Booth remembers Grubb as a "forcefully vociferous but never unthinking" critic.

In the 1980s, he taught English at the Open University and at universities in Egypt, Morocco, Saudi Arabia and Tunisia.

=== Personal life and death ===
He was a keen hiker and motorcyclist. As a result of injury, he became a double amputee in 2012. He gained notoriety as a "ferocious letter-writer." One obituarist compared him to "the great Victorian letter writers, crafting long diatribes packed with criticism, satire, politics and comment."

He died of pneumonia 24 May 2017 aged 86. Though irreligious, Grubb requested his funeral be conducted according to Quaker tradition.

== Work ==
=== Title Deeds (1961) ===
His first collection of poetry, Title Deeds, was published in 1961. Grubb wrote it "in reaction against the dull, platitudinous smoothness of the Movement poets." According to Martin Booth, the collection "put into practice all Grubb’s teachings and philosophies":

He wanted to see verse that was intricate yet straightforward, unpretentious yet conscious of itself as both art and expression to others less endowed with poetic acumen. … [Title Deeds] sought to dispel the bunk of poetry but keep to its ideals of beauty and emotional expression.

It was noted for its "opaque" style, "dense, often abstruse language" and "bizarre imagery," which "withholds sensuous appeal." While finding it "in some respects exasperating," noting its "strenuous contrivance" and "unnecessary obscurity," Richard Kell judged it "one of the richest and most promisting first collections to have appeared recently" and a sign of "lively and ingenious talent."

However, Grubb later "renounced" the collection and his later poetry has yet to be collected.

=== A Vision of Reality (1965) ===
His critical study A Vision of Reality: A Study of Liberalism in Twentieth-Century Verse was published in 1965. For the Times obituarist, this critical work rather than the poetry represents Grubb's "serious achievement."

Philip Toynbee praised the book for its readings of "modern English poetry from Yeats to Alan Brownjohn," especially for bringing "new praise and not new blame" to established poets (W. B. Yeats, T. S. Eliot, Robert Graves and William Empson), for highlighting the "underrecognized" (Isaac Rosenberg, Edwin Muir and Herbert Read), and for "many new perceptions" of contemporary poets (Thom Gunn, Ted Hughes and Peter Porter). Similarly, Shirley Toulson found that "it is among his contemporaries — Larkin, Porter, Hughes — that Grubb is most alive and perceptive," and praised Grubb's emphasis on "social context" and the poet "as a public being," which she compared favourably to "the 'inner life' approach." And Martin Booth considers Grubb "the first book critic to seriously consider Ted Hughes's animal poetry as well as the poetry of the then-developing Peter Porter."

On the other hand, Raymond Williams found it "difficult and interesting" but ultimately "confused." And Toynbee was unconvinced by Grubb's "attempt to impose a general theme … that only 'liberal' poetry can be good poetry," finding that "Lionel Trilling faced the issue more squarely."

== References in literature ==
In James Fenton's poem "Letter to John Fuller," Grubb appears as an icon of bygone London literary bohemia:

Old soaks from former poets' pubs
And after-hours drinking clubs,
Rouged admen, rugose Fleet Street subs,
Exiles from the Bronx,
People with names like Frederick Grubb's
Or Rosemary Tonks'.

== Selected publications ==
=== Poetry ===
- The Imperfect Day: A Long Poem (Cambridge: Cambridge Express, 1953).
- Title Deeds and Other Poems (London: Longmans, Green, 1961).
- September Sun (Frensham, Surrey: Sceptre Press, 1969).
- Frog (Rushden, Northants.: Sceptre Press, 1972).

=== Prose ===
- A Vision of Reality: A study of Liberalism in Twentieth-Century Verse (London: Chatto and Windus, 1965).

=== As editor ===
- Michael Roberts, Selected Poems and Prose (Manchester: Carcanet, 1980).
