= The Menorah Journal =

American magazine

The Menorah Journal (1915–1962) was a Jewish-American magazine, founded in New York City. Some have called it "the leading English-language Jewish intellectual and literary journal of its era." The journal lasted from 1915 until 1961.

== History ==
1920s: The journal emerged from the Menorah Society (founded 1906) at Harvard University which had been created to emphasize the best aspects of Judaism in English, so that not only Jews, but others could see the richness of the culture, the literature and the religion. Horace Kallen, who worked with Henry Hurwitz on the magazine, developed a theory of cultural pluralism, where all the different religions and cultures in the US would emphasize the best of their religion and culture so that all could appreciate those individuals different from themselves as well as their cultures. The Menorah Society expanded from Harvard to other colleges and an Intercollegiate Menorah Association arose in 1913; membership peaked in the 1920s on 80 US and Canadian colleges and universities. Hurwitz started the Journal in 1915 and for the first few years, it emphasized the best of Judaism.

1930s: The Great Depression that started in late October 1929 led the journal to cut publishing from monthly to quarterly. At the same time, Jewish intellectuals moved left, splitting readership. "In 1931, a core of key editors and writers, including Elliot E. Cohen, Herbert Solow, and Felix Morrow joined the Communist Party and its literary journal, the New Masses. Most of these writers had abandoned the Party by 1934 for Trotskyism. Most moved away from Jewish identity (except Cohen, who became editor of Commentary of the American Jewish Committee). Solow's wife, Tess Slesinger is presumed to have described much of the Menorah scene in the guise of fiction in her book The Unpossessed (1934).

1940s–1960s: Following World War II, nationalist Zionism become popular, but journal editor Hurwitz aligned the Menorah Journal with the American Council for Judaism (Reform Judaism) and so it was not Zionist. More specifically, Hurwitz advocated what he termed "Zakkaian Judaism" (Yohanan ben Zakkai). The journal ended shortly after Hurwitz's death (1961).

== Founders ==
- Henry Hurwitz (1886–1961): long-time editor
- Harry Wolfson (1887–1974): historian, philosopher
- Horace Kallen (1882–1972): advocate of "cultural pluralism"

== Editors ==
- Henry Hurwitz
- Herbert Solow
- Elliot E. Cohen

== Contributors ==
Writers:

- Isaac Babel
- Salo Baron
- Chaim Bialik
- Randolph Bourne
- Morris Raphael Cohen
- Lucy Dawidowicz
- Simon Dubnow
- Mordecai Kaplan
- A. M. Klein
- Fritz Mauthner
- Lewis Mumford
- I. L. Peretz
- Charles Reznikoff
- Cecil Roth
- Nina Salaman
- Maurice Samuel
- Isidor Schneider
- I. B. Singer
- Tess Slesinger
- Lionel Trilling
- Harry Wolfson

Artists:

- Marc Chagall
- William Gropper
- William Meyerowitz
- Elie Nadelman
- Lionel S. Reiss
- Max Weber

== External sources ==
- The Menorah Journal archive at HathiTrust
- Leo W. Schwarz (ed.). The Menorah Treasury. Jewish Publication Society. p. 963.
- Wald, Alan M. (July 13, 2016). The New York Intellectuals: The Rise and Decline of the Anti-Stalinist Left from the 1930s to the 1980s. UNC Press. pp. 30–64.
