= Robert Warshow =

American author and critic (1917–1955)

Robert Samuel Warshow (1917–1955) was an American author associated with the New York Intellectuals. He is best known for his criticism of film and popular culture for Commentary and The Partisan Review.

== Life ==
Born in New York City and raised in its Bronx borough, Warshow graduated from the University of Michigan in 1938. He briefly wrote for The New Leader before being stationed in Washington, D.C. as a member of the Army Signal Corps during World War II. He was managing editor of Commentary from 1946 until his death.

Warshow died of a heart attack at the age of 37.

== Works ==
Among the articles published in Warshow's lifetime were "The Westerner" and "The Gangster as Tragic Hero", analyses of the Western movie and the gangster movie genre from a cultural standpoint. The opening sentence of "The Westerner" reads "The two most successful creations of American movies are the gangster and the Westerner: men with guns."

Warshow also penned essays praising playwright Clifford Odets as well as George Herriman's newspaper comic strip Krazy Kat. "The 'Idealism' of Julius and Ethel Rosenberg" showed the executed American Stalinists in a brutally honest light. In a critique of The Crucible Warshow argued that Arthur Miller was not as competent a dramatist as was perceived. After Fredric Wertham and Gershon Legman, Warshow was the first serious critic to write about EC Comics and its Mad magazine, albeit from a measured and equivocal perspective.

Most of his published work was collected in the book The Immediate Experience in 1962. An expanded edition was released by Harvard University Press in 2001.

== See also ==
- Gilbert Seldes
- Otis Ferguson
- Manny Farber
- James Agee
- Andrew Sarris
- Pauline Kael

== Books ==
- Robert Warshow: Immediate Experience. Movies, Comics, Theatre and Other Aspects of Popular Culture, Doubleday, Garden City, NY, 1962. 282 pp. With a contribution by Lionel Trilling.
- Robert Warshow: The Immediate Experience. Movies, Comics, Theatre and Other Aspects of Popular Culture, Harvard University Press, Cambridge, Mass., 2001. 302 pp. Expanded reprint, including Lionel Trilling, new contributions from David Denby and Stanley Cavell.
