= Are Husbands Necessary? =

1942 film

- Directed by: Norman Taurog
- Written by: Tess Slesinger; Frank Davis
- Produced by: Fred Kohlmar
- Starring: Ray Milland; Betty Field; Patricia Morison
- Cinematography: Charles Lang
- Edited by: LeRoy Stone
- Music by: Robert Emmett Dolan
- Production company: Paramount Pictures
- Distributed by: Paramount Pictures
- Release date: June 15, 1942
- Running time: 80 minutes
- Country: United States
- Language: English
- Budget: $552,000.
- Box office: $1,050,000 (US rentals)

Are Husbands Necessary? is a 1942 American comedy film directed by Norman Taurog and starring Ray Milland and Betty Field. It follows the misadventures of a wacky wife and her sometimes exasperated, but loving, banker husband. The film's screenplay was adapted by the husband-and-wife writing team of Tess Slesinger and Frank Davis, from the novel Mr. and Mrs. Cugat, the Record of a Happy Marriage by Isabel Scott Rorick. This novel would later be a source for the related 1948 radio series My Favorite Husband starring Lucille Ball, which itself would evolve into the television series I Love Lucy. A more direct TV adaptation of the radio series retained the title My Favorite Husband.

A one-hour Lux Radio Theatre adaptation of the film, featuring George Burns and Gracie Allen, aired February 15, 1943, on CBS Radio.

== Cast ==
- Ray Milland as George Cugat
- Betty Field as Mary Elizabeth Cugat
- Patricia Morison as Myra Ponsonby
- Eugene Pallette as Bunker
- Phillip Terry as Cory Cartwright
- Richard Haydn as Chuck
- Charles Dingle as Duncan Atterbury
- Kathleen Lockhart as Laura Atterbury
- Leif Erickson as Bill Stone
- Cecil Kellaway as Dr. Buell
- Elisabeth Risdon as Mrs. Westwood
- Charlotte Wynters as Mrs. Finley

== Critical reception ==
Reviews for the film were mixed. The San Jose Evening News praised it as, "Paramount's hilarious excursion into marital high jinks". The Spokane Daily Chronicle called it a "cleverly written tale, that sparkles with humorous situations". The review in the Schenectady Gazette was less positive, stating that "it has a few amusing moments, but for every one of them there are a score of scenes that are silly without being funny". Film critic Leonard Maltin, writing in his Movie Guide, cited the movie's title when writing his two-out-of-four-stars review that simply asked, "And what about this film?" A highly negative review was issued by critic Bosley Crowther of The New York Times, who wrote that it was, "An almost pitiful endeavor to squeeze a few more laughs with frivolous marital farce", and, "Tolerant folks will regard it as a wistful echo from the past, while more demanding customers will rephrase the title and fling it back into Paramount's teeth."
