= Herbert Solow (journalist) =

American journalist

Herbert Solow (20 November 1903 – 26 November 1964) was an American journalist and co-editor of the Menorah Journal who was first a Communist fellow-traveler in the 1920s, a Trotskyist in the 1930s, and then abandoned leftist politics to work in Henry Luce's publishing empire as Fortune editor.

== Career ==
=== Studies ===
Solow was a member of the Columbia College class of 1924. His schoolmates included Clifton Fadiman, Lionel Trilling, Meyer Schapiro, and Whittaker Chambers.

=== Menorah Journal ===
Solow and Elliot E. Cohen were co-editors of The Menorah Journal. Together in the 1930s, they led many of the magazine's contributors toward the left, according to Diana Trilling's recollections. Solow's wife, Tess Slesinger described much of the Menorah scene in the guise of fiction in her book The Unpossessed (1934).

According to Alfred Kazin, Solow was:

Although a little-known editor of the obscure Menorah Journal in the 1920s, and later of Fortune, Herbert Solow manages to appear in Tess Slesinger's Unpossessed (1934) as a New England Calvinist at war with his own Marxism; in Eleanor Clark's Bitter Box (1946) as a disillusioned Communist bank clerk; and, most impressively, in James T. Farrell's posthumously published Sam Holman (1983) as the Communist lady-killer after whom the book is named.

=== Dewey and Trotsky ===
During the Great Purges of the 1930s, Solow sided with Leon Trotsky and became acquainted with John Dewey. When friend Whittaker Chambers broke with the Communist Party and left the underground, Solow helped him contact Dewey (which led to nothing) and helped him re-establish himself in public.

=== Fortune magazine ===
Solow abandoned Leftist politics altogether in the 1940s and, like Chambers, joined the publishing empire of Henry Luce as an editor at Fortune Magazine. (Chambers was at Time magazine.) Solow helped bring prominent professionals such as photographer Walker Evans over to Fortune.

Solow edited all of and translated parts of Management in Russian Industry and Agriculture by Gregory Bienstock, Solomon M. Schwarz, and Aaron Yugow, published in 1944.

=== Death ===
A heavy smoker all his life, Solow died in 1964, just past his 61st birthday.

== Writings ==
- The Nation "War in Minneapolis" (August 8, 1934)
- Google Book Search articles cited in The New York Intellectuals by Alan Wald (1987)
- Hoover Institution Archives list of published and unpublished articles
- Google Book Search "Operations Research" from Fortune Magazine (1951) in An Annotated Timeline of Operations Research: An Informal History by Saul I. Gass (Springer Science & Business 2005)
- University of Indiana - Lilly Library Manuscript Collections Eastman MSS - correspondence
- University of Chicago Review of Jonathan P. Grossman's William Sylvis: Pioneer of American Labor (1946)
