= The New York Intellectuals (book) =

1987 history book by Alan M. Wald

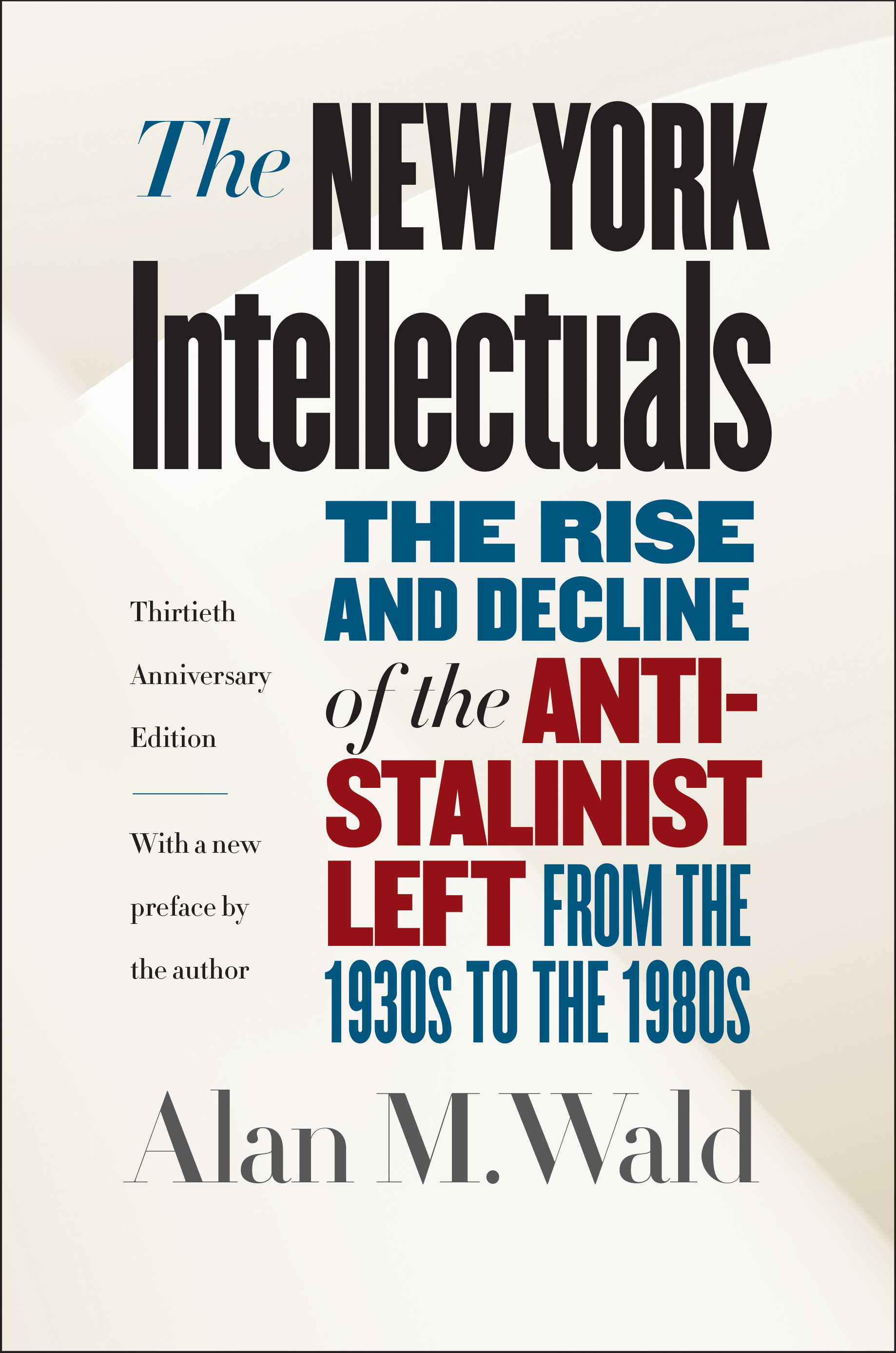
- Cover of 30th anniversary edition
- Author: Alan M. Wald
- Subject: American history, intellectual history
- Publisher: University of North Carolina Press
- Publication date: 1987
- Pages: 440

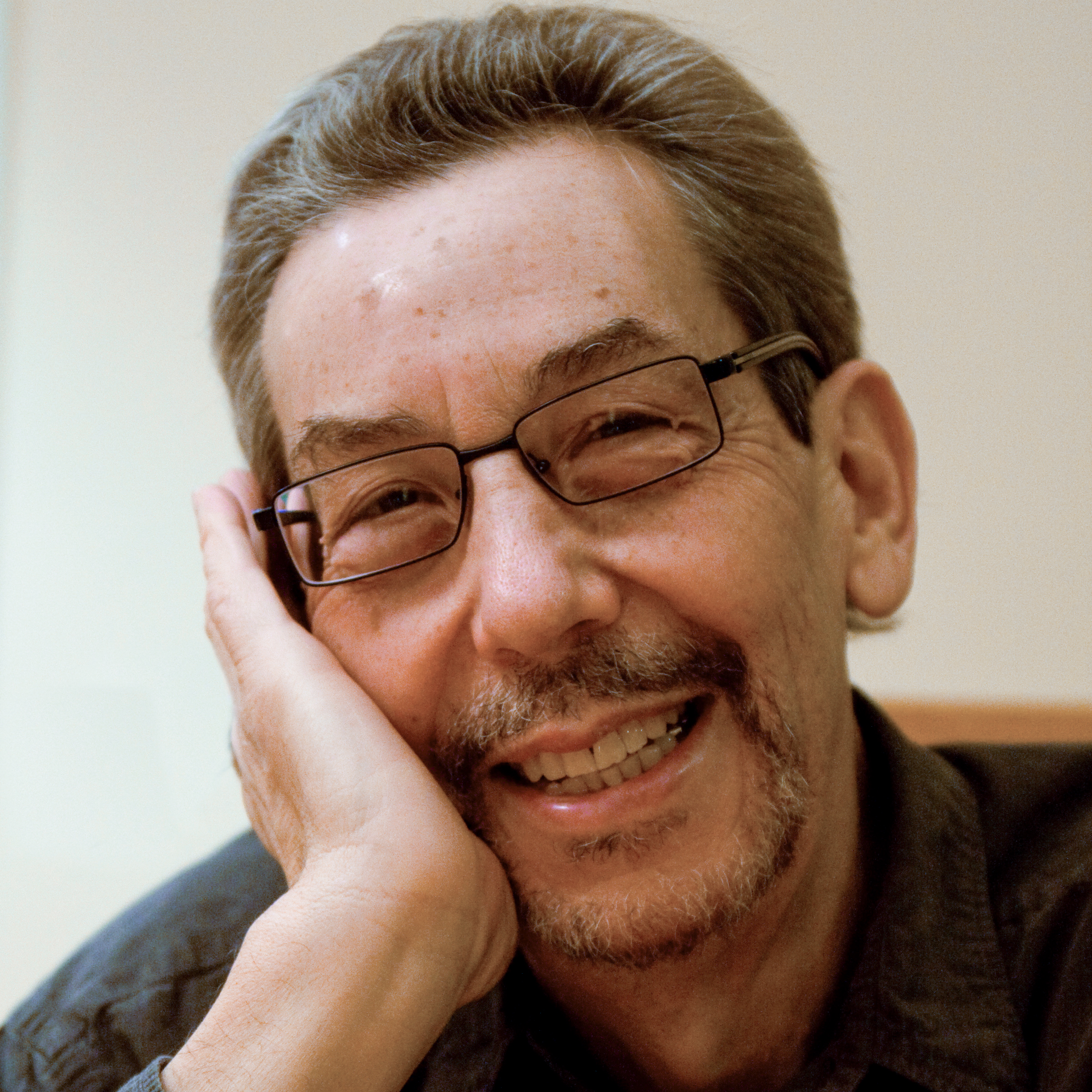
The author in 2010

The New York Intellectuals: The Rise and Decline of the Anti-Stalinist Left from the 1930s to the 1980s is a 1987 history book about the New York Intellectuals by Alan M. Wald.
