= Herbert Solow =

Herbert Solow may refer to:

- Herbert Solow (journalist) (1903–1964), leftwing journalist and later editor of Fortune
- Herbert F. Solow (1930–2020), television producer/writer, best known for Star Trek
