= Isaac Rosenfeld =

American novelist

- Born: March 10, 1918; Chicago, Illinois, U.S.
- Died: July 14, 1956 (aged 38); Chicago, Illinois, U.S.
- Occupation: Author
- Children: 2

Isaac Rosenfeld (March 10, 1918 - July 14, 1956) was an American writer who became a prominent member of New York intellectual circles. Rosenfeld wrote one novel (Passage from Home, 1946), which, according to literary critic Marck Shechner, "helped fashion a uniquely American voice by marrying the incisiveness of Mark Twain to the Russian melancholy of Dostoevsky," and many articles for The Nation, Partisan Review, and The New Republic. Some of those articles were posthumously published in a volume titled An Age of Enormity, and his short stories were later published as Alpha and Omega.

== Background ==
Many of Rosenfeld's short stories revolve around family, and were to some extent inspired by his own Chicago family: his bombastic father, his mother Miriam who died young, his sister, his unmarried aunts. He and his wife Vasiliki had two children, George and Eleni, the latter of which later became a Buddhist nun. He grew up a few blocks from Saul Bellow, and had known him since he was a teenager, when they worked on the same high school newspaper.

He moved in 1941 from Chicago to New York to study philosophy at New York University, dropping out to write fiction after about a year. By the late 1940s, he was immersed in the philosophy of Wilhelm Reich, "the errant Freud disciple turned ideologue of the orgasm". He made many friends among the New York Intellectuals, and had great influence on their writing. "He swayed his friends," said Saul Bellow, "with an unknown power." Bellow admired him as having "one of those ready, clear minds that see the relevant thing immediately." His friends regarded him initially, according to Irving Howe, as the "golden boy" of the New York literary elite, but later remembered him in their memoirs as a man who, despite his brilliance, never fulfilled his potential; as Howe put it, a "Wunderkind grown into tubby sage ... he died of lonely sloth..." He died on July 14, 1956, of a heart attack in his one-room apartment in Chicago.

Rosenfeld is the inspiration for the literary characters of King Dahfu in Henderson the Rain King by Bellow and of Leslie Braverman in To an Early Grave by Wallace Markfield, the latter of which was made into the movie Bye Bye Braverman by director Sidney Lumet.

== Bibliography ==
- Passage from Home (1946)
- An Age of Enormity (MacGibbon-Kee, London, 1962)
- Alpha and Omega (World Publishing Co. Cleveland, 1966)
