= The Experience of Literature =

1967 book edited by Lionel Trilling

First edition

The Experience of Literature: A Reader with Commentaries is an anthology of drama, fiction, and poetry selected and edited by the American critic Lionel Trilling and published in 1967. The anthology is intended to provide a representative selection of works that Trilling considered to be great literature. It includes examples from the whole history of western literature, from Greek tragedy up to the 1960s, with each piece preceded by an introductory preface by Trilling. The selections reflect the literary canon of western universities at that time, with correspondingly low representation of women and writers of colour.

== Part 1: Drama ==
Sophocles, Oedipus Rex
William Shakespeare, The Tragedy of King Lear
Henrik Ibsen, The Wild Duck
Anton Chekhov, The Three Sisters
George Bernard Shaw, The Doctor's Dilemma
Luigi Pirandello, Six Characters in Search of an Author: A Comedy in the Making
William Butler Yates, Purgatory
Bertolt Brecht, Galileo

== Part 2: Fiction ==
Nathaniel Hawthorne, My Kinsman, Major Molineux
Herman Melville, "Bartleby the Scrivener: A Story of Wall Street"
Plus 20 more stories.

== Part 3: Poetry ==
- "Lydicus"
- "Dover Beach"
- "Ode to a Nightingale"
- "To His Coy Mistress"
- "Ode to the West Wind"

Plus many more poems

== Part 4: Poetry for Further Reading ==
Contains over 200 poems
