= Eleanor Clark =

American novelist (1913–1996)

- Born: July 6, 1913; Los Angeles, California
- Died: February 16, 1996 (aged 82); Boston, Massachusetts
- Occupation: Author
- Spouses: Jan Frankel (m. 1937, divorced) Robert Penn Warren (m. 1952)
- Children: 2, including Rosanna
- Writing career
- Language: English
- Notable work: The Oysters of Locmariaquer (1964)
- Notable awards: National Book Award
- Website: nationalbook.org/people/eleanor-clark

Eleanor Clark (July 6, 1913 – February 16, 1996) was an American writer and "master stylist," best known for her non-fiction accounts.

== Background ==
Eleanor Clark was born on July 6, 1913, in Los Angeles, California, but grew up in Roxbury, Connecticut. She attended Vassar College in the 1930s, where she met Mary McCarthy.

== Career ==
Clark was involved with the literary magazine Con Spirito there, along with Elizabeth Bishop, Mary McCarthy, and her sister Eunice Clark. She also associated with Herbert Solow and helped translate documents for the 1937 "trial" of Leon Trotsky.

During World War II, Clark worked in the Office of Strategic Services (OSS) in Washington, DC.

Clark wrote reviews, essays, children's books, and novels.

== Personal life and death ==
In 1937, Clark married Jan Frankel, a secretary of Trotsky; they divorced by the mid-1940s. In 1952, Clark married Robert Penn Warren and lived in Fairfield, Connecticut, with him and their two children, Rosanna and Gabriel.

In her mid sixties, Clark developed an aggressive form of macular degeneration that later stabilized but left her with seriously reduced vision.

On February 16, 1996, Clark died age 82 in Boston, Massachusetts.

== Awards ==
- 1953: National Book Award finalist nonfiction for Rome and a Villa
- 1964: National Book Award in Arts and Letters for The Oysters of Locmariaquer

== Works ==
For her book The Oysters of Locmariaquer (1964), Clark received the U.S. National Book Award in the short-lived category Arts and Letters.

When Rome and the Villa was reissued, Anatole Broyard called it "perhaps the finest book ever to be written about a city."

Clark wrote about her experiences with the CPUSA and Trotskyites in at least two fictionalized accounts, Bitter Box (1946) and Gloria Mundi (1979).

Novels:

- Bitter Box (1946)
- Baldur's Gate (1970)
- Song of Roland (1960)
- Dr. Heart: A Novella and Other Stories (1974)
- Gloria Mundi: A Novel (1979)

Nonfiction:

- Rome and a Villa (1952)
- Oysters of Locmariaquer (1964)
- Eyes, Etc.: A Memoir (1977)
- Tamrart: 13 Days in the Sahara (1984)
- Camping Out (1986)

Translations:

- Dark Wedding (1943), translation of Epitalamio del Prieto Trinidad by Ramón José Sender

== See also ==
- Robert Penn Warren
- Rosanna Warren
- Mary McCarthy (author)
- Elizabeth Bishop
- Herbert Solow (journalist)
