= The Liberal Imagination =

1950 book by Lionel Trilling

- Author: Lionel Trilling
- Language: English
- Genre: Literary criticism
- Publisher: Viking Press
- Publication date: 1950
- Publication place: United States
- OCLC: 492151679

The Liberal Imagination: Essays on Literature and Society (1950) is a collection of sixteen essays by American literary critic Lionel Trilling, published by Viking in 1950. The book was edited by Pascal Covici, who had worked with Trilling when he edited and introduced Viking's Portable Matthew Arnold in 1949. With the exception of the preface, which was written specifically for the publication of the book, all the essays included in The Liberal Imagination were individually published in the decade before the book's publication in literary and critical journals, such as The Partisan Review, The Kenyon Review, The Nation, and The American Quarterly. The essays represent Trilling's written work and critical thoughts of the 1940s.

In the essays, Trilling explores the theme of what he calls "liberalism" by looking closely at the relationship between literature, culture, mind, and the imagination. He offers passionate critiques against literary ideas of reality as material and physical, such as those he ascribes to V. L. Parrington, Theodore Dreiser, and the writers of the Kinsey Reports. He supports writers who engage in "moral realism" through an engaged imagination and a "power of love," which he sees expressed in works by Henry James, Mark Twain, Tacitus, F. Scott Fitzgerald, and William Wordsworth—and in the ideas of human nature in the works of Sigmund Freud.

The Liberal Imagination enjoyed a relatively large commercial success, selling 100,000 hardcover and 70,000 paperback copies, and was later to be understood as an essential book for a group of influential literary, political, and cultural thinkers of the era, called “The New York Intellectuals." The initial reviewers, such as Irving Howe, R. P. Blackmore, Norman Podhoretz, and Delmore Schwartz, represent the importance of this book to the "Intellectuals." In later years, scholars turned to The Liberal Imagination as a work representative of the post-war politics and culture of the United States, which was entering the early stages of the Cold War with the Soviet Union.

== Synopses ==
=== “Preface” ===
Trilling introduces the book, writing that though the essays that comprise the volume “are diverse in subject, they have…a certain unity.” The unity, he suggests, is an interest in liberalism. Trilling argues that because his contemporary America is predominantly tending to an intellectually liberal tradition, the lack of a robust conservative intellectual tradition causes the lack of a cultural dialectic, making liberal ideas also weak. He writes that a critical view on literature is the best way to “recall liberalism to its first essential imagination” because it is the “human activity that takes the fullest and most precise account of variousness, possibility, complexity, and difficulty.” In this way, Trilling introduces that his essays on literature will inevitably broach topics of culture, politics, and imagination.

=== “Reality in America” ===
Trilling confronts the influence of literary critic V.L. Parrington’s Main Currents in American Thought (1927), and the response to the novels of American writer Theodore Dreiser, to discuss what he sees as the dangerous consequences of a writer's supposed responsibility to a conception of reality as material and physical. Trilling argues that Parrington believed in a reality that is "immutable; it is wholly external, it is irreducible," and that Parrington believed the job of a literary writer to be the transmission of this reality by loyal reproduction. This conception of reality can turn Americans toward an unwarranted "sympathetic indulgence" of writers, such as Dreiser, who claim to represent material reality ("hard, resistant, unformed, impenetrable, and unpleasant.") when they are really representing an ideology of reality, such as Dreiser's nihilism. It also informs a disavowal of writers, such as Henry James, that engage in the "electrical qualities of the mind," and are not easily conformed to a social mission or politic.

=== "Sherwood Anderson" ===
Trilling addresses the literary work and career of novelist Sherwood Anderson, trying to reconcile his admiration for the man with the problems of his work. He assesses Anderson as victim to the fate "of the writer who at one short past moment has had a success with a simple idea which he allowed to remain simple and fixed." Trilling describes Anderson's "standing quarrel with respectable society" as one that once bred a truth related to the "precious secret essence" of individuals, but then led to a negation of the life of his characters through an excess of intellection, feeling, and a "love made wholly abstract." Trilling writes, "the more Anderson says about people, the less alive they become—and the less loveable." Though Trilling's evaluation of Anderson's truth is that it failed in literary expression—and that his lifeless worlds suggest a politic of subservient "marching men"—Trilling still admires the truthfulness of Anderson's "personal struggle with modernity," likening Anderson's work to an adolescence one must experience and eventually move on from.

=== "Freud and Literature" ===
Trilling sees Sigmund Freud’s psychology as the "only systematic account of the human mind which, in point of subtlety and complexity, of interest and tragic power, deserves to stand beside the psychological insights which literature has accumulated through the centuries." Trilling argues that Freud's relationship of influence with literature is reciprocal; that Freud was positivistic and rationalistic, and not devoted only to the "night side of life"; and that one can make a connection between Freud's conceptions of the dream, neurosis, and art to explain how an artist "is in command of his fantasy, while it is exactly the mark of the neurotic that he is possessed by his fantasy." Trilling rejects psychoanalytic readings of literary works that rely on an author's intention, and proposes that readers look for the "whole conception of the mind" implicit in a work's psychological "effects" and the psychological "temperament of the artist as a man." Trilling ends the essay reflecting on Freud's later work, in which the "death instinct" was introduced to complement the "pleasure principle," forming a state of man as "a kind of hell from within him from which rise everlastingly the impulses which threaten his civilization," where "compromise and the compounding with defeat constitute his best way of getting through the world." Thus, Trilling applauds Freud's tragic sense of the state of humanity.

=== "The Princess Casamassima" ===
Trilling places Henry James’s novel, The Princess Casamassima (1886), as among the greatest of novels from the nineteenth century. In his reading of the novel, Trilling points out James's "penetrating imagination" that gives an accurate account and imagining of not only the anarchy of the 1880s, but also the "social actuality" of anarchy's general moral claim on the goodness of humanity and the corruptive character of society. Trilling investigates the autobiographical aspects of the novel to conclude that the novel also acts as James's "demonstrative message," and that the artist possesses social responsibility. James's novel is an achievement of what Trilling calls "moral realism," which rests on James's "knowledge of complication," a penetrating awareness of "modern ironies," and an "imagination of disaster" complemented by an "imagination of love." Trilling concludes that James's moral realism in the novel results in an incomparable work that tells "the truth in a single luminous creation."

=== "The Function of the Little Magazine" ===
Trilling wrote this essay on the event of the publication of The Partisan Reader, celebrating the ten-year anniversary of the literary magazine Partisan Review, a magazine that, though influential, maintained a relatively low circulation. He argues that this irony is representative of a "great gulf" between the educated class and the best of contemporary literature, caused by a "fatal separation" “between the political ideas of our educated class and the deep places of the imagination." Partisan Review's mission, Trilling writes, is to "organize a union" between political ideas and the imagination by insisting on the realization that "unless we insist that politics is imagination and mind, we will learn that imagination and mind are politics and of the kind that we will not like."

=== "Huckleberry Finn" ===
Trilling offers a reading of Mark Twain’s Huckleberry Finn to explain why he believes it to be "one of the greatest books and one of the central documents of American culture." Trilling argues that the book tells the truth "of moral passion" between the protagonist Huck and the benign and dangerous "river-God", symbolized by the Mississippi River. Trilling describes Huck's moral crisis as being between his "genuinely good will" and his distrust of others, based on a "profound and bitter knowledge of human depravity." He also mentions that the book's context in the years after the American Civil War implies that the book is commentary on an America that lost its moral values by serving a "money-god" without moral value, in the place of the moral river-god of Huckleberry Finn.

=== "Kipling" ===
Trilling sees Rudyard Kipling as a writer belonging "irrevocably to our past;" specifically, the past of childhood, where a justified rejection of him represents "our first literary-political decision." Kipling, Trilling writes, was "one of liberalism's major intellectual misfortunes." Trilling describes Kipling as unlovable because of the mindlessness of his ideas, most especially of his "mindless imperialism," which made readers react against him as a dangerous proponent of nationalism and national values. In so doing, Trilling argues, Kipling did damage to the very national values he cared so much about.

=== "The Immortality Ode" ===
In his reading of William Wordsworth’s ode, Ode: Intimations of Immortality, Trilling counters the biographical reading of the poem as what literary critic Dean Sperry calls Wordsworth's "dirge sung over his departing powers." Evoking the context of the poem in comparison with Samuel Taylor Coleridge’s "Dejection: Ode” and Wordsworth's autobiographical Prelude, Trilling argues the ode is Wordsworth's embrace of “new powers” and a “new poetic subject.” Trilling sees Wordsworth's new power as a “double vision” through which he recognizes the ideal and earthly qualities of life and humanity. In this way, the poem represents Wordsworth's maturity into adulthood, and an awareness of mortality, that makes the world even more “significant and precious.”

=== “Art and Neurosis” ===
Trilling confronts the notion that an artist's imagination and genius comes from a neurotic illness. He concedes that one can gain “psychic knowledge” through psychological suffering, but maintains that an artist's power is related to the mind in general, not only to the artist's inner mind. Trilling offers a universal idea of neurosis, in which it is possible that all of humanity is “ill” with neurotic conflicts. An artist's genius, Trilling argues, is how he articulates and represents the neurotic conflict to effect the readers’ “egos in struggle.” Trilling concludes that we should focus on how an artist “shapes the material of pain we all have.”

=== “The Sense of the Past” ===
Trilling believes, countering the formal reading style of the New Critics, that we must read literature with a sense of its past. The aesthetic aspect of a work's "pastness" ("the intellectual conditions in which a work of literature was made") is an important part of understanding its power, validity, and relevance. Trilling also argues that literary artists are both effects and causes of culture, and that historical criticism which treats a literary movement as something that can fail or succeed incorrectly supposes ideas are autonomous "generators of human events," that literature is meant to settle the problems of life "for good," and that the will plays little part in human life. Thus, Trilling suggests (evoking Nietzsche) "an ambivalent view" of the historical sense that looks to culture as "life's continuing evaluation of itself."

=== "Tacitus Now" ===
Trilling argues that though his histories "have been put to strange uses," Roman historian Tacitus had a psychological "conception of history [that] was avowedly personal and moral." Trilling believes the "bitter division" between Tacitus's love of the Roman Republic's virtues and character and his despair at the republic's day having past informed a "secret tension" that "accounts for the poise and energy of his intellect."

=== "Manners, Morals, and the Novel" ===
Trilling argues that manners, the "hum and buzz of implication," are a significant part of the formation of culture, and therefore are an important part of literature. He sees a novel's focus on social manners as a focus on a moral conflict between reality and appearance, a research into the truth behind the "snobbery" of false appearance and moneyed status. A novelist's creative awareness of manners becomes the "function of his love," making his literary work what Trilling calls "moral realism," in which the moral imagination is given free play. Trilling concludes that the novel of manners has never been "established" in America because of a conception of reality as the "hard, brute facts of existence." Moral realism, he argues, is sorely needed to respond to a contemporary commitment to "moral righteousness."

=== "The Kinsey Report" ===
Trilling introduces the publication and commercial success of The Kinsey Reports (1948) as a therapy for society's need for the establishment of a "community of sexuality" and a symptom of that community's need to be "established in explicit quantitative terms." The study's scientific look at sex, Trilling finds, implies a neutrality, but hides a conception of sex as only existing first in its physical fact, rather than in interaction with its emotional reality. Trilling argues that the Report dehumanizes sexual behavior and rejects the idea that sex is involved with an "individual's character." This is especially true in the Report's discussion of sexual taboos, in which the writers reject the innateness of homosexuality and neglect that "the emotional circumstance of breaking of the taboo" is more significant than physically breaking the taboo itself. Trilling concludes that the Report's idea of fact as a "physical fact" rejects the crucial "personal or cultural meaning," or "even the existence," of the social fact of sexuality.

=== "F. Scott Fitzgerald" ===
Trilling examines the life and literary career of American novelist F. Scott Fitzgerald, admiring Fitzgerald's heroism found "in his power of love." Fitzgerald's tragic love, Trilling suggests, is "destructive by reason of its very tenderness," because it was a "delicate tension" between an idea of human free-will along with a belief in the force of circumstance. Trilling calls Fitzgerald "a moralist to the core," because Fitzgerald was able to transcend the historical moment to "seize the moment as a moral fact." Analyzing Fitzgerald's novel, The Great Gatsby, Trilling writes that the character Gatsby, "divided between power and dream, comes inevitably to stand for America itself." Trilling concludes that Fitzgerald's known lack of prudence is in fact his "heroic fault," in that it allowed him to deal, with tenderness, "a true firmness of moral judgment."

=== "Art and Fortune" ===
Trilling reflects on whether "the novel is still a living form," concluding that he does not believe the novel to be dead. He sees the declining perception of the novel as reflective of a weakness in the "general intellectual life" and a passivity in the political mind. Trilling argues that the novel, as a "celebration and investigation of the human will," can reconstitute the will by teaching it to refuse the temptation of the ideologies of the social world. Trilling predicts that the novels of the future will "deal very explicitly with ideas," and that they should criticize ideas by attaching them to their "appropriately actuality," instead of allowing ideas to be systematized thoughtlessly through ideology. Trilling wants novelists to realize their ability "to maintain ambivalence toward their society," and wants a general understanding of the "fortuitous and gratuitous nature of art" that makes an intellectual atmosphere where novels are possible.

=== "The Meaning of a Literary Idea" ===
Trilling defines an idea as the product of the juxtaposition of two emotions, and as the key dialectic component of literature. He sees the anxiety about ideas in literature as actually an anxiety that ideology, a "respect for certain formulas" whose "meaning and consequence we have no clear understanding," will intellectualize the power and spontaneity out of life. Poets, Trilling argues, can be attracted to ideas without being "violated" by them, and poets often try to develop consistent intellectual positions along with their poetry. Trilling elevates the importance of "activity" in literary thinking that keeps ideas constantly at play with one another. He categorizes the American writers John Dos Passos, Eugene O’Neill, and Thomas Wolfe as violated by an idea because of passivity, and argues that the "piety" of writers like Ernest Hemingway and William Faulkner allowed them to engage their hearts deeply with ideas. Trilling concludes by advocating that we think of ideas as "living things, inescapably connected with our wills and desires," in order to facilitate a more active literature.

== Style ==
Commentators of The Liberal Imagination note two distinguishing qualities of Trilling's prose: his use of the plural singular and the balanced sentence. The common subject, ‘we,’ in Trilling's writing produces both an inviting and authoritative effect because readers feel that they are a part of the educated and literate podium behind which Trilling stands, and that they are sharing in not “mere opinion,” but “corporate understanding.” His repeated employment of a parallel sentence-structure may symbolize Trilling's dedication to the “negative capability” he encourages throughout the book, in which a thinker can hold two ideas in his head at once and function nonetheless.

== Initial reception ==
Literary critic and democratic-socialist advocate Irving Howe, in his review of the book in The Nation, finds troubling Trilling's criticism of moral passions that do not account for "an active moral passion against social injustice," and contends that the definition Trilling relies on does not match liberalism’s history as a "code of intellectual tolerance and freedom," as the bringer of the Enlightenment, and as the political doctrine that supports capitalism. Howe describes Trilling as an ideologue whose work is "excessively dependent on that mere will whose danger he has so often observed."

A 21-year-old student at Columbia and writing for British journal Scrutiny, Norman Podhoretz, later to become a substantial figure in the "neo-conservative" movement that grew out of "The New York Intellectuals," writes that The Liberal Imagination is not really about liberalism at all (as Howe argues); it is "a collection of critical essays," whose purpose is to clear the air rather than definitively demonstrate. As criticism, Podhoretz suggests, it represents Trilling's belief that America's future depends on an integration of the European influence of British literary thinker Matthew Arnold’s criticism into "the American pattern," which Trilling attempts in the book.

In his essay published in The Partisan Review, poet and short-novelist Delmore Schwartz, critically evaluated "Manners, Morals, and the Novel," as representative of what he calls Trilling's ability to make his personal preference for a novel of manners into a "standard of judgment and a program for the novelist."Schwartz explains this personal preference as symptomatic of Trilling's general dislike for the method of modern authors and what Schwartz sees as Trilling's veiled sole concern: not the general welfare of the society in general, but “the welfare of the educated class,” of which Trilling acts a “guardian and critic.”

Literary critic and Princeton professor of English R.P. Blackmur, in his 1950 review of the book in the Kenyon Review, writes that the core questions of The Liberal Imagination are what the American mind is to do with "mass urban society," and what is to be done to surmount a pervasive distrust of the intellect. Blackmur posits that the literature Trilling supports never existed. The true subject Trilling addresses, Blackmur suggests, is the "politics of human power," and the place literature has in creating "turbulence" in ordering principles of societal living.

== Later interpretations and influence ==
Later commentators on The Liberal Imagination focus on the historical, political, and cultural contexts and influences of Trilling's work and thoughts. The Liberal Imagination can be seen as Trilling's response to the simplifying force of the Marxism and disillusionment prevalent in the orthodoxy of the American political left in 1930s life, best exemplified by the Soviet Union's Popular Front, by presenting himself through the essays as the "Intellectuals’ Representative Man." Indeed, The Liberal Imagination can be read as a pivotal point in the New York Intellectuals' turn from a Soviet communism to a strong anti-Stalinist cultural front. The anti-Stalinist implications in The Liberal Imagination exist in the ways Trilling articulates a critical stance against reductive, simplifying, and systematized ideological thinking.

The publication of The Liberal Imagination also stands as a critical moment in Trilling’s career as he developed his position as a public intellectual. As a representative of complexity, Trilling, in place of an applicable theory of reading, offers a “certain temper” to serve as the basis of a critical analysis of politics, culture, and literature. But, in his expressed ambivalence to exactly what kind of politic or society he envisions, he leaves open the possible results of the critical mindset he proposes; this is perhaps because Trilling was already aware that the logical conclusion of his temper is a profound conservativism.

Trilling, in the years following the publication of The Liberal Imagination, came to typify a broader “conservative turn” of liberal intellectuals turned anti-communist and suspicious of the reductive character of the intellectual left. Further, many of Trilling's intellectual heirs include prominent neo-conservatives, such as Irving Kristol and Norman Podhoretz. In terms of literature, the way of reading presented in The Liberal Imagination, in which a single author can embody the essence of his culture, “provided the rationale” of the reduction of American authors from college textbooks between the years of 1940s and 1970s, along with an increased neo-conservative focus on the “tragic vision” that would be pervasive in literature syllabi in mid-twentieth century America.
