= Sincerity and Authenticity =

1972 book by Lionel Trilling

- Cover of the first edition
- Author: Lionel Trilling
- Language: English
- Published: 1972
- Publication place: United States
- ISBN: 978-0-674-80861-4

Sincerity and Authenticity is a 1972 book by Lionel Trilling, based on a series of lectures he delivered in 1970 as Charles Eliot Norton Professor at Harvard University.

The lectures examine what Trilling described as "the moral life in process of revising itself", a period of Western history in which, argues Trilling, sincerity became the central aspect of moral life (first observed in pre–Age of Enlightenment literature such as the works of Shakespeare), later to be replaced by authenticity (in the twentieth century).

The lectures take great lengths to define and explain the terms "sincerity" and "authenticity", though no clear, concise definition is ever really postulated, and Trilling even considers the possibility that such terms are best not totally defined. However, he does use the short formula "to stay true to oneself" to characterize the modern ideal of authenticity and differentiates it from the older ideal of being a morally sincere person. Trilling draws on a wide range of literature in defense of his thesis, citing many of the key (and some more obscure) Western writers and thinkers of the last 500 years.

Trilling's Sincerity and Authenticity has been of influence on literary and cultural critics and philosophers, such as Templeton and Kyoto Prize winner Charles Taylor in his book The Ethics of Authenticity. See also, the more recent work of Kyle Michael James Shuttleworth in The History and Ethics of Authenticity: Freedom, Meaning and Modernity (2020), and Hans-Georg Moeller and Paul J. D’Ambrosio in You and Your Profile: Life After Authenticity (2021)
