= Bye Bye Braverman =

1968 American black comedy film by Sidney Lumet

- Original poster
- Directed by: Sidney Lumet
- Written by: Herbert Sargent
- Based on: To an Early Grave by Wallace Markfield
- Produced by: Sidney Lumet
- Starring: George Segal; Jack Warden; Jessica Walter; Phyllis Newman; Joseph Wiseman; Sorrell Booke; Zohra Lampert; Godfrey Cambridge; Alan King
- Cinematography: Boris Kaufman
- Edited by: Gerald B. Greenberg
- Music by: Peter Matz
- Distributed by: Warner Bros.-Seven Arts
- Release date: February 21, 1968
- Running time: 94 minutes
- Country: United States
- Language: English

Bye Bye Braverman is a 1968 American comedy film directed by Sidney Lumet. The screenplay by Herbert Sargent was adapted from the 1964 novel To an Early Grave by Wallace Markfield.

== Plot ==
When minor writer Leslie Braverman dies suddenly from a heart attack at the age of 41, his four best friends decide to attend his funeral. The quartet of Jewish intellectuals consists of public relations writer Morroe Rieff from the Upper East Side, essayist Barnet Weinstein from the Lower East Side, book reviewer Holly Levine from the Lower West Side, and Yiddish writer Felix Ottensteen from the Upper West Side.

They agree to travel to the funeral in Levine's cramped Volkswagen Beetle. Due to confusion and bad directions from Braverman's widow, the men get lost in Brooklyn. During their travels the car collides with a taxicab driven by a black Jewish driver. Levine initially is hostile to the driver but they bond.

The four attend a funeral presided over by a long-winded rabbi, which turns out to be the wrong funeral. They finally arrive at the cemetery in time for the burial.

During their trip, the four engage in extensive discussions on popular culture and religion. Rieff periodically experiences absurdist fantasy episodes or daydreams involving his own mortality, eventually delivering a soliloquy to a vast array of gravestones bringing the dead up to date on what they have missed lately.

== Cast ==
- George Segal as Morroe Rieff
- Jack Warden as Barnet Weinstein
- Joseph Wiseman as Felix Ottensteen
- Sorrell Booke as Holly Levine
- Jessica Walter as Inez Braverman
- Phyllis Newman as Myra Mandelbaum
- Zohra Lampert as Etta Rieff
- Godfrey Cambridge as Taxi Driver
- Alan King as The Rabbi
- Anthony Holland as Max Ottensteen, son of Felix Ottensteen

== Literary inspirations and allusions ==
Dalkey Archive Press editor Jeremy M. Davies, in connection with reprints of Markfield's books, has called him "The Joyce of Brighton Beach," suggesting by analogy a comparison between Markfield and this quintessentially Jewish neighborhood and the essential literary synergy between James Joyce and his native Dublin, but also suggesting other connections. The structure of Markfield's To an Early Grave, and therefore of the movie based upon it, is to some extent a comic parallel of Joyce's novel Ulysses, specifically "Episode 6" (which is commonly known as the "Hades" chapter) where protagonist Leopold Bloom and three friends travel in a carriage to attend the funeral of Patrick "Paddy" Dignam who has died in a drunken stupor. The fantasy or flashback experiences of Morroe Rieff mirror Joyce's stream of consciousness writing style. In turn, Joyce's Dignam character is generally regarded as an echo of Elpenor in the Odyssey from ancient Greece.

Stanford University professor Steven J. Zipperstein, writing about the author Isaac Rosenfeld, has stated that the character of Leslie Braverman was modeled on the real-life Rosenfeld, who died of a heart attack at age 38 in 1956. Zipperstein notes that Rosenfeld's premature death in failed circumstances is mentioned prominently in the memoirs of many who, like Markfield, were in the Partisan Review literary circle, including Alfred Kazin, Irving Howe, and William Phillips. Rosenfeld has also been acknowledged, according to Zipperstein, as the model for the character of King Dahfu in the 1959 novel Henderson the Rain King by Saul Bellow; Rosenfeld and Bellow had been friends since their teenage years.

== Critical reaction ==
Pauline Kael described it as "a crudely affectionate comic romp. The movie is often gross and it's sloppily thrown together, but the characters' rhetoric has some juice in it...It's a low-comedy situation played for emotional wallowing as well as for laughs." Time wrote that the movie "has a lot to talk about, and nothing much to say...As the story's central character, actor Segal shows flashes of a comic talent hitherto unexplored by Hollywood. But what picture there is for stealing is burgled by Wiseman with his portrayal of a stereotypical literateur."

In her New York Times review, Renata Adler described the characters as "unattractive and painful in a low-grade, humiliating way", and called the encounter with the cab driver pointless and tasteless. Variety called the film "a curious mixture of tasty and tasteless jokes, all at the expense of Jewish people", and said the film "describes, in padded vignette and travelog transition, the hypocritical mourning of a deceased man by four alleged friends." It said that "Sargent has taken the ‘dark comedy’ approach; were it black comedy, or straight comedy, it might have worked better. As it is, the curious and erratic use of Jewish ruggedness of spirit and the native non-sequitur humor makes for a plot stew which will offend the sensibilities of many, and titillate the prejudices of others."

Charles Champlin of the Los Angeles Times gave a mixed review, saying the film has many funny moments but "wobbles between insight and sight-gag, between true observation and a heavy handed striving for ethnic jokes".

According to the Time Out London Film Guide, the film is "a little unfocused but bristles with Jewish wit and fine performances".

== Home media ==
The film was released on DVD in April 2009 as part of the Warner Archive series.

== See also ==
- List of American films of 1968
