= Isabel Scott Rorick =

American writer (1900–1967)

- Born: April 13, 1900; Toledo, Ohio
- Died: 1967 (aged 66–67)
- Resting place: Woodlawn Cemetery
- Occupation: Writer

Isabel Scott Rorick (April 13, 1900 – 1967) was an American writer known for her comedic book Mr. and Mrs. Cugat, which was one of the top ten best selling books in the United States in 1941.

== Early years ==
Rorick was born in Toledo, Ohio on April 13, 1900, the daughter of Josiah Scott and Elizabeth Wolcott Doyle Scott. Her education came in private schools in Toledo and at Dobbs Ferry, New York, in the Masters School. Her involvement in the local Junior League newsletter in the mid-1930s eventually led to her contributing fictional sketches to the national Junior League publication.

== Career ==
Rorick's stories about the married Cugat couple, a young bank executive and his wife, led to interest by Houghton Mifflin, and ten sketches complete with illustrations were published in October 1940 as Mr. and Mrs. Cugat, the Record of a Happy Marriage. It became one of the best selling books of 1941. It was also made into a movie in 1942, Are Husbands Necessary? starring Ray Milland and Betty Field as the Cugats.

Rorick published a follow-up collection of Cugat stories, Outside Eden, in November 1945. In 1948, the radio show My Favorite Husband based on the Cugat stories debuted on CBS Radio. Lucille Ball and Richard Denning played the Cugats, though their last name was soon changed to Cooper to avoid confusion with bandleader Xavier Cugat. When CBS asked Ball to do a television version of the show, she insisted that her husband Desi Arnaz play her husband on the show. Since Arnaz could not pull off the role of a midwestern banker, the show was reworked into what became I Love Lucy. A more direct TV adaptation of the radio series retained the title My Favorite Husband.

== Personal life and death ==
Rorick married Ceilan Herbert Rorick on October 7, 1922. He was a banker in the Spitzer-Rorick Trust and Savings Bank of Toledo who died in June 1958. Rorick died in 1967. Her maid discovered her body in Rorick's home on October 11, 1967. A coroner declared her death a suicide, noting that her throat was cut and a razor blade was discovered near the body. The Roricks are buried in Woodlawn Cemetery in Toledo. The couple had two children, Horton and Elizabeth (Mimi).
