= Rosanna Warren =

American poet and scholar (born 1953)

- Born: July 27, 1953 (age 73); Fairfield, Connecticut, US
- Education: Yale University (BA); Johns Hopkins University (MA)
- Occupations: Poet, scholar
- Parents: Robert Penn Warren (father); Eleanor Clark (mother)

Rosanna Phelps Warren (born July 27, 1953) is an American poet and scholar.

== Biography ==
Warren is the daughter of poet, novelist, literary critic and Poet Laureate Robert Penn Warren and writer Eleanor Clark. She graduated from Yale University, where she was a member of Manuscript Society, in 1976, with a degree in painting, and then in 1980 received an M.A. from Johns Hopkins Writing Seminars. She served as the Emma MacLachlan Metcalf Professor of the Humanities and a university professor at Boston University until 2012. From 2012 until her retirement, Warren was the Hanna Holborn Gray Distinguished Service Professor in the Committee on Social Thought at the University of Chicago.

Warren's first collection of poetry, Each Leaf Shines Separate (1984), received generally favorable notice in a review in The New York Times. Her next collection, Stained Glass, won the Lamont Poetry Prize for the best second volume published in the U. S. in 1993; in his review, Jonathan Aaron described these poems "tough-minded, beautifully crafted meditations". Warren was awarded the Metcalf Award for Excellence in Teaching at Boston University in 2004. She held a Lannan Foundation Marfa residency in 2005.

In the 2008–09 academic year, Warren was a fellow of the Dorothy and Lewis B. Cullman Center for Scholars and Writers at the New York Public Library.

== Family ==
On December 21, 1981, Warren married Stephen Scully, but is now divorced. She has two daughters. Her younger daughter, Chiara Scully, graduated from Yale University and is a psychiatric social worker whose poetry has been published in the Seneca Review and The New Republic. Her elder daughter, Katherine Scully Porter, also graduated from Yale University and is a lawyer. Warren has two grandchildren, Adelaide and Lachlan Porter.

== Awards ==
Warren's other awards include several Pushcart Prizes, the American Academy of Arts and Letters Award of Merit in Poetry, the Witter Bynner Poetry Prize (1993), the Sara Teasdale Award in Poetry (2011), a grant from the American Council of Learned Societies, a Guggenheim Fellowship, and in 2022, the David Ferry and Ellen LaForge Poetry Prize from Suffolk University. In 1990 she served as poet in residence at The Frost Place in Franconia, New Hampshire. She is a member of The American Academy of Arts and Letters, the American Philosophical Society, and The American Academy of Arts and Sciences, and has served as Chancellor of the Academy of American Poets. In spring of 2006 she received a Berlin Prize to fund half a year of study and work at the American Academy in Berlin.

== Bibliography ==
=== Poetry ===
==== Collections ====
- Pastorale. Palaemon Press. 1980.
- Snow Day. Palaemon Press Limited. 1981.
- Each Leaf Shines Separate. W. W. Norton. October 17, 1984. ISBN 978-0-393-30205-9.
- Stained Glass. W. W. Norton. 1993. ISBN 0-393-03486-0.
- Departure. W. W. Norton. 2003. ISBN 0-393-05819-0.
- Ghost in a Red Hat. W. W. Norton. 2011. ISBN 978-0393080063.
- So Forth. W. W. Norton. 2020. ISBN 978-1-324-00459-2.
- Hindsight. W. W. Norton. 2025. ISBN 978-1-324-11695-0.

==== List of poems ====
Title	Year	First published
Coots	2026	”Coots”. The New Yorker. March 23, 2026.
Cirrus	2025	”Cirrus”. The New Yorker. April 14, 2025.
Snow	2024	”Snow”. The New Yorker. December 16, 2024.
A New Year	2023	"A New Year". The New Yorker. January 30, 2023.
In a Strange Land	2023	"In a Strange Land". The Yale Review. January 11, 2023.
Small Dead Snake	2022	"Small Dead Snake". The Threepenny Review. Summer 2022. p. 16.
Soseki's Shrine	2022	"Soseki's Shrine". The Kenyon Review. May–June 2022.
Inscription	2022	"Inscription". The Kenyon Review. May–June 2022.
Number Theory	2021	"Number Theory". The New Yorker. March 8, 2021.
From the Notebooks of Anne Verveine	2021	"From the Notebooks of Anne Verveine". Poetry Foundation. May 30, 2021.
Intimate Letters	2021	"Intimate Letters". Poetry Foundation. May 30, 2021.
Interior at Petworth: From Turner	2021	"Interior at Petworth: From Turner". Poetry Foundation. May 30, 2021.
For Chiara	2019	"For Chiara". The New Yorker. Vol. 95, no. 2. March 4, 2019. p. 50.
Cotillion Photo	2016	"Cotillion Photo". The New Yorker. Vol. 91, no. 46. February 1, 2016. p. 34.
The Twelfth Day	2009	"The Twelfth Day". Daedalus. 138 (1): 68–70. Winter 2009. doi:10.1162/daed.2009.138.1.68. S2CID 57562548.
Romanesque	2008	"Romanesque". The New Yorker. October 6, 2008.
A Kosmos	2007	"A Kosmos". The New Yorker. November 5, 2007.
Palaces	2007	"Palaces". Threepenny Review. Winter 2007.
For Trakl	2003	"For Trakl". AGNI. 2003.
Lake	2002	"Lake". Slate. November 12, 2002.
Invitation au Voyage: Baltimore	2002	"Invitation au Voyage: Baltimore". AGNI. 2002.

=== Criticism ===
- “Ghosting: Laura Riding and Gertrude Stein”. The Hopkins Review, Summer 2025, vol. 18, n. 3, pp. 94-111.
- "Arthur Rimbaud: Insulting Beauty". The Atlantic. October 21, 2008.
- Fables of the Self: Studies in Lyric Poetry. W. W. Norton & Company. 2008. ISBN 978-0-393-06613-5.
- "A Symposium on Forsaken Favorites: Sylvia Plath". The Threepenny Review. Spring 2009.
- Askold Melnyczuk, ed. (2022). "Derek Walcott: Poetry and the Powers". Between Fury and Peace: The Many Arts of Derek Walcott. Arrowsmith Press. p. 237-243.
- Warren, Rosanna (Winter 2023). "Foreign Affairs: The Many Lives and Loves of the Mysterious Saint-John Perse". The American Scholar.
- Warren, Rosanna (Winter 2023). "Little Abysses: Adam Zagajewski's 'Evening, Stary Sacz'". The Hopkins Review. 16 (1): 109-113. doi:10.1353/thr.2023.0015. S2CID 257485078.
- Warren, Rosanna (Summer 2024). "Happy Birthday, Harmonium". Liberties. 4 (4): 75-87.
- Warren, Rosanna (Autumn 2024). "Reborn in the City of Light". The American Scholar: 58-72.
- Warren, Rosanna (August 2024). "My Mother's Oysters: Recollections of Breton Summers" (PDF). Harper's. p. 46-53.

=== Translations ===
- Euripides (1995). The Suppliants. Oxford University Press US. ISBN 978-0-19-504553-6. Translator with Stephen Scully, The Suppliants (Euripides)

=== Non-fiction ===
- Max Jacob: A Life in Art and Letters. W. W. Norton & Company. 2020. ISBN 978-1-324-02198-8.
