= Lionel Trilling =

American literary critic (1905–1975)

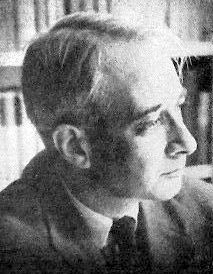
- Trilling c. 1950
- Born: Lionel Mordechai Trilling; July 4, 1905; New York City, US
- Died: November 5, 1975 (aged 70); New York City, US
- Education: Columbia University
- Occupations: Literary critic, professor
- Years active: 1931–1975
- Employer: Columbia University
- Known for: Literary criticism
- Notable work: The Liberal Imagination (1950)
- Spouse: Diana Trilling (m. 1929)
- Children: James Trilling
- Relatives: Billy Cross (nephew)
- Website: Lionel Trilling on columbia.edu

Lionel Mordecai Trilling (July 4, 1905 – November 5, 1975) was an American literary critic, short story writer, essayist, and teacher. One of the leading U.S. critics of the 20th century, he analyzed the contemporary cultural, social, and political implications of literature. He and his wife, Diana Trilling (née Rubin), were members of the New York Intellectuals and contributors to the Partisan Review.

== Personal and academic life ==
Lionel Mordecai Trilling was born in Queens, New York, the son of Fannie (née Cohen), who was from London, and David Trilling, a tailor from Białystok in Poland. His family was Jewish. In 1921, he graduated from DeWitt Clinton High School, and, at age 16, entered Columbia University, beginning a lifelong association with the university. He joined the Boar's Head Society and wrote for the Morningside literary journal. In 1925, he graduated from Columbia College, and in 1926 he earned a master's degree at the university (his master's essay was titled Theodore Edward Hook: his life and work). He then taught at the University of Wisconsin–Madison and at Hunter College.

In 1929, he married Diana Rubin, and the two began a lifelong literary partnership. In 1932, he returned to Columbia to pursue his doctoral degree in English literature and to teach literature. He earned his doctorate in 1938 with a dissertation about Matthew Arnold that he later published. He was promoted to assistant professor the next year, becoming Columbia's first tenured Jewish professor in its English department. He was promoted to full professor in 1948.

Trilling became the George Edward Woodberry Professor of Literature and Criticism in 1965. He was a popular instructor and for 30 years taught Columbia's Colloquium on Important Books, a course about the relationship between literature and cultural history, with Jacques Barzun. His students included Lucien Carr, Jack Kerouac, Donald M. Friedman, Allen Ginsberg, Eugene Goodheart, Steven Marcus, John Hollander, Richard Howard, Cynthia Ozick, Carolyn Gold Heilbrun, George Stade, David Lehman, Leon Wieseltier, Louis Menand, Robert Leonard Moore, and Norman Podhoretz.

Trilling was the George Eastman Visiting Professor at the University of Oxford from 1963 to 1965 and Charles Eliot Norton Professor of Poetry at Harvard University for academic year 1969–70. In 1972, the National Endowment for the Humanities selected him to deliver the first Jefferson Lecture in the Humanities, described as "the highest honor the federal government confers for distinguished intellectual achievement in the humanities." Trilling was a senior Fellow of the Kenyon School of English and subsequently a senior Fellow of the Indiana School of Letters. He held honorary degrees from Trinity College, Harvard University, and Case Western Reserve University and memberships in the American Academy of Arts and Sciences and the American Academy of Arts and Letters. He also served on the boards of The Kenyon Review and Partisan Review.

Trilling, a longtime heavy smoker, died of pancreatic cancer in 1975. He was survived by his wife and son, James Trilling, an art historian who served as a curator at the George Washington University Museum and Textile Museum. His nephew Billy Cross is a musician residing in Denmark.

== Partisan Review and the "New York Intellectuals" ==
In 1937, Trilling joined the recently revived magazine Partisan Review, a Marxist but anti-Stalinist journal founded by William Philips and Philip Rahv in 1934.

The Partisan Review was associated with the New York Intellectuals—Trilling, Diana Trilling, Lionel Abel, Hannah Arendt, William Barrett, Daniel Bell, Saul Bellow, Richard Thomas Chase, F. W. Dupee, Leslie Fiedler, Paul Goodman, Clement Greenberg, Elizabeth Hardwick, Irving Howe, Alfred Kazin, Hilton Kramer, Steven Marcus, Mary McCarthy, Dwight Macdonald, William Phillips, Norman Podhoretz, Harold Rosenberg, Isaac Rosenfeld, Delmore Schwartz, and Susan Sontag—who emphasized the influence of history and culture on authors and literature. The New York Intellectuals distanced themselves from the New Critics.

In his preface to the essay collection Beyond Culture (1965), Trilling defended the New York Intellectuals: "As a group, it is busy and vivacious about ideas, and, even more, about attitudes. Its assiduity constitutes an authority. The structure of our society is such that a class of this kind is bound by organic filaments to groups less culturally fluent that are susceptible to its influence."

== Critical and literary works ==
Trilling wrote one novel, The Middle of the Journey (1947), about an affluent Communist couple's encounter with a Communist defector. (Trilling later acknowledged that the character was inspired by his Columbia College compatriot and contemporary Whittaker Chambers.) His short stories include "The Other Margaret". Otherwise, he wrote essays and reviews in which he reflected on literature's ability to challenge the morality and conventions of the culture. Critic David Daiches wrote, "Mr. Trilling likes to move out and consider the implications, the relevance for culture, for civilization, for the thinking man today, of each particular literary phenomenon which he contemplates, and this expansion of the context gives him both his moments of his greatest perceptions, and his moments of disconcerting generalization."

Trilling published two complex studies of authors Matthew Arnold (1939) and E. M. Forster (1943), both written in response to a concern with "the tradition of humanistic thought and the intellectual middle class which believes it continues this tradition." His first collection of essays, The Liberal Imagination, was published in 1950, followed by the collections The Opposing Self (1955), focusing on the conflict between self-definition and the influence of culture, Freud and the Crisis of Our Culture (1955), A Gathering of Fugitives (1956), and Beyond Culture (1965), a collection of essays on modern literary and cultural attitudes toward selfhood. In Sincerity and Authenticity (1972), he explores the ideas of the moral self in post-Enlightenment Western civilization. He wrote the introduction to The Selected Letters of John Keats (1951), in which he defended Keats's notion of negative capability, as well as the introduction, "George Orwell and the Politics of Truth," to the 1952 reissue of Orwell's Homage to Catalonia.

In 2008, Columbia University Press published an unfinished novel Trilling abandoned in the late 1940s. Scholar Geraldine Murphy discovered it among Trilling's papers archived at Columbia University. The Journey Abandoned: The Unfinished Novel is set in the 1930s and has a young protagonist, Vincent Hammell, who seeks to write a biography of an older poet, Jorris Buxton. Buxton's character is loosely based on the 19th-century Romantic poet Walter Savage Landor. Writer and critic Cynthia Ozick praised the novel's "skillful narrative" and "complex characters", writing, "The Journey Abandoned is a crowded gallery of carefully delineated portraits whose innerness is divulged partly through dialogue but far more extensively in passages of cannily analyzed insight."

== Politics ==
Trilling's politics have been strongly debated and, like much else in his thought, may be described as "complex." An oft-quoted summary of Trilling's politics is that he wished to:

[Remind] people who prided themselves on being liberals that liberalism was ... a political position which affirmed the value of individual existence in all its variousness, complexity, and difficulty.

Trilling wrote, "Ideology is not the product of thought; it is the habit or the ritual of showing respect for certain formulas to which, for various reasons having to do with emotional safety, we have very strong ties and of whose meaning and consequences in actuality we have no clear understanding."

Politically, Trilling was a noted member of the anti-Stalinist left, a position he maintained to the end of his life.

=== Liberal ===
In his earlier years, Trilling wrote for and in the liberal tradition, explicitly rejecting conservatism; from the preface to his 1950 essay The Liberal Imagination (emphasis added to the much-quoted last line):

In the United States at this time Liberalism is not only the dominant but even the sole intellectual tradition. For it is the plain fact that nowadays there are no conservative or reactionary ideas in general circulation. This does not mean, of course, that there is no impulse to conservatism or to reaction. Such impulses are certainly very strong, perhaps even stronger than most of us know. But the conservative impulse and the reactionary impulse do not, with some isolated and some ecclesiastical exceptions, express themselves in ideas but only in action or in irritable mental gestures which seek to resemble ideas.

=== Neoconservative ===
Some, both conservative and liberal, argue that Trilling's views became steadily more conservative over time. Trilling has been embraced as sympathetic to neoconservatism by neoconservatives (such as Norman Podhoretz, the former editor of Commentary). But this embrace was unrequited; Trilling criticized the New Left (as he had the Old Left) but did not embrace neoconservativism.

Diana Trilling claimed that neoconservatives were mistaken in thinking that Trilling shared their views. "I am of the firmest belief that he would never have become a neoconservative", she wrote in her memoir of their marriage, "The Beginning of the Journey", adding, "nothing in his thought supports the sectarianism of the neoconservative."

The extent to which Trilling may be identified with neoconservativism continues to be debated.

=== Moderate ===
Trilling has alternatively been characterized as solidly moderate, as evidenced by many statements, ranging from the title of his novel, The Middle of the Journey, to a central passage from the novel:

An absolute freedom from responsibility—that much of a child none of us can be. An absolute responsibility—that much of a divine or metaphysical essence none of us is.

Along the same lines, in reply to a taunt by Richard Sennett, "You have no position; you are always in between," Trilling replied, "Between is the only honest place to be."

== Works by Trilling ==
Fiction

- The Middle of the Journey. New York: Viking Press. 1947. LCCN 47031472.
- Of This Time, of That Place and Other Stories. New York: Harcourt Brace Jovanovich. 1979. ISBN 015168054X. (Selected by Diana Trilling and published posthumously.)
- Geraldine Murphy, ed. (2008). The Journey Abandoned: The Unfinished Novel. New York: Columbia University Press. ISBN 9780231144506. (Published posthumously)

Nonfiction and essays

- Matthew Arnold. New York: W.W. Norton & Co. 1939. LCCN 39027057. (Based on Trilling's Ph.D. thesis.)
- E.M. Forster. Norfolk, Conn.: New Directions Books. 1943. LCCN 43011336.
- The Liberal Imagination: Essays on Literature and Society. New York: Viking Press. 1950. LCCN 50006914.
- The Opposing Self: Nine Essays in Criticism. New York: Viking Press. 1955. LCCN 55005871.
- Freud and the Crisis of Our Culture. Boston: Beacon Press. 1955. LCCN 55011594.
- Gathering of Fugitives. Boston: Beacon Press. 1956.
- Beyond Culture: Essays on Literature and Learning. New York: Viking Press. 1965. LCCN 65024276.
- Sincerity and Authenticity. Cambridge, Massachusetts: Harvard University Press. 1972. ISBN 0674808606. (A collection of the Charles Eliot Norton Lectures given at Harvard in 1970.)
- Mind in the Modern World: The 1972 Thomas Jefferson Lecture in the Humanities. New York: Viking Press. 1973. ISBN 0670003778.
- Diana Trilling, ed. (1979). The Last Decade: Essays and Reviews, 1965–75. New York: Harcourt Brace Jovanovich. ISBN 015148421X. (Published posthumously)
- Diana Trilling, ed. (1980). Speaking of Literature and Society. New York: Harcourt Brace Jovanovich. ISBN 015184710X. (Published posthumously.)
- Leon Wieseltier, ed. (2000). The Moral Obligation to Be Intelligent: Selected Essays. New York: Farrar, Straus, and Giroux. ISBN 0374257949. (Published posthumously.)
- Arthur Krystal, ed. (2001). A Company of Readers: Uncollected Writings of W.H. Auden, Jacques Barzun, and Lionel Trilling from The Readers' Subscription and Mid-Century Book Clubs. New York: Free Press. ISBN 0743202627.
- Adam Kirsch, ed. (2018). Life in Culture: Selected Letters of Lionel Trilling. New York: Farrar, Straus, and Giroux. ISBN 9780374185152. (Published posthumously.)

Prefaces, afterwords, and commentaries

- Introduction to The Portable Matthew Arnold. New York: Viking Press. 1949. LCCN 49009982.
- Introduction to Selected Letters of John Keats. New York: Farrar, Straus and Young. 1951.
- Introduction to 'Collected Stories of Isaac Babel. New York: Criterion Books. 1955.
- Introduction to Austen, Jane (1957). Emma. Boston: Houghton Mifflin Co. (Riverside edition of Jane Austen's 1815 novel)
- Introduction to Pawel Mayewski, ed. (1958). The Broken Mirror: A Collection of Writings from Contemporary Poland. New York: Random House. LCCN 58010948.
- Introduction to Jones, Ernest (1975) [1961]. The Life and Work of Sigmund Freud. New York: Basic Books. ISBN 9780465097005. LCCN 61-1950.
- Afterword to Slesinger, Tess (1966). The Unpossessed. New York: Avon Books. (Reprint of Tess Slesinger's 1934 novel.)
- Preface and commentaries to The Experience of Literature: A Reader with Commentaries
- Introduction to Trilling, Lionel (1970). Literary Criticism: An Introductory Reader. New York: Holt, Rinehart, and Winston. ISBN 0030795656.
- Introduction to James, Henry, The Princess Casamassima. New York, The Macmillan Company. 1948

== Bibliography ==
- Alexander, Edward. Lionel Trilling and Irving Howe: And Other Stories of Literary Friendship. Transaction, 2009. ISBN 978-1-4128-1014-2.
- Ariano, Raffaele. Filosofia dell'individuo e romanzo moderno. Lionel Trilling tra critica letteraria e storia delle idee, Edizioni Storia e letteratura, 2019.
- Bloom, Alexander. Prodigal Sons: The New York Intellectuals & Their World, Oxford University Press, 1986. ISBN 978-0-19-505177-3
- Chace, William M. “Lionel Trilling”, Johns Hopkins Guide to Literary Theory and Criticism.
- Kimmage, Michael. The Conservative Turn: Lionel Trilling, Whittaker Chambers, and the Lessons of Anti-Communism. Harvard University Press, 2009. ISBN 978-0-674-03258-3.
- Kirsch, Adam. Why Trilling Matters. Yale University Press, 2011. ISBN 978-0-300-15269-2.
- Krupnick, Mark. Lionel Trilling and the Fate of Cultural Criticism. Northwestern University Press, Evanston, 1986. ISBN 978-0-8101-0712-0
- Lask, Thomas. “Lionel Trilling, 70, Critic, Teacher and Writer, Dies”, The New York Times, November 5, 1975
- Leitch, Thomas M. Lionel Trilling: An Annotated Bibliography. New York: Garland, 1992
- Longstaff, S. A. “New York Intellectuals”, Johns Hopkins Guide to Literary Theory and Criticism.
- O'Hara, Daniel T. Lionel Trilling: The Work of Liberation. U. of Wisconsin P, 1988.
- Shoben, Edward Joseph Jr. Lionel Trilling Mind and Character, Frederick Ungar Publishing Co., 1981, ISBN 0-8044-2815-8
- Trilling, Diana. The Beginning of the Journey: The Marriage of Diana and Lionel Trilling. Harcourt, Brace & Company, 1993. ISBN 0-15-111685-7.
- Trilling, Lionel. Beyond Culture: Essays on Literature and Learning.
- Trilling, Lionel et al., The Situation in American Writing: A Symposium Partisan Review, Volume 6 5 (1939)
- Wald, Alan M. (1987). The New York Intellectuals: The Rise and Decline of the Anti-Stalinist Left from the 1930s to the 1980s. University of North Carolina Press. ISBN 0-8078-4169-2.
