= New York Intellectuals =

Mid-20th-century American writers and critics

The New York Intellectuals were a group of American writers and literary critics based in New York City in the mid-20th century. They advocated left-wing politics, being firmly anti-Stalinist. The group is known for having sought to integrate literary theory with Marxism and socialism while rejecting Soviet socialism as a workable or acceptable political model.

Irving Kristol, Irving Howe, Seymour Martin Lipset, Leslie Fiedler, and Nathan Glazer were members of the Young People's Socialist League, under the influence of Max Shachtman.

Many of these intellectuals were educated at City College of New York ("Harvard of the Proletariat"), New York University, and Columbia University in the 1930s, and associated in the next two decades with the left-wing political journals Partisan Review, Dissent, and the then-left-wing but later neoconservative-leaning journal Commentary. Writer Nicholas Lemann has described these intellectuals as "the American Bloomsbury."

Some, including Kristol, Sidney Hook, and Norman Podhoretz, (Note: Podhoretz and managing editor of Commentary and leaning toward neoconservatism is dealt with in: Lerner, 2011, p.165-166. See References.) later became key figures in the development of neoconservatism.

== Members ==
Writers often identified as members of this group include:

- Lionel Abel
- Hannah Arendt
- William Barrett
- Daniel Bell
- Saul Bellow (despite his usual association with the city of Chicago)
- Norman Birnbaum
- Anatole Broyard
- Elliot E. Cohen
- Lewis Coser
- Rose Coser
- Midge Decter
- Morris Dickstein
- Leslie Fiedler
- Herbert Gans
- Nathan Glazer
- Clement Greenberg
- Paul Goodman
- Michael Harrington
- Gertrude Himmelfarb
- Richard Hofstadter
- Sidney Hook
- Irving Howe
- Alfred Kazin
- Irving Kristol
- Norman Mailer
- Seymour Martin Lipset
- Mary McCarthy
- Dwight Macdonald
- William Phillips
- Norman Podhoretz
- Philip Rahv
- Harold Rosenberg
- Isaac Rosenfeld
- Bayard Rustin
- Delmore Schwartz
- Susan Sontag
- Harvey Swados
- Diana Trilling
- Lionel Trilling
- Robert Warshow

== See also ==
- Anti-Stalinist left
- Communism
- Frankfurt School
- Trotskyism
- Neoconservatism
- Bloomsbury Group
- New Philosophers
- Partisan Review
- Commentary Magazine
- The New Yorker
- Encounters Magazine

== Bibliography ==
- Bloom, Alexander. Prodigal Sons: The New York Intellectuals and Their World, Oxford University Press, 1986, ISBN 0-19-503662-X
- Cooney, Terry A. The Rise of the New York Intellectuals: Partisan Review and Its Circle, 1934-1945, University of Wisconsin Press, 1986, ISBN 0-299-10710-8
- Dorman, Joseph. Arguing the World: The New York Intellectuals in their Own Words. New York: Free Press, 2000. ISBN 0-684-86279-4.
- Howe, Irving (1970). "The New York Intellectuals". Decline of the New. New York: Harcourt, Brace & World. pp. 211–265. ISBN 978-0-15-124510-9.
- Jumonville, Neil. Critical Crossings: The New York Intellectuals in Postwar America, University of California Press, 1991, ISBN 0-520-06858-0
- Laskin, David. Partisans: Marriage, Politics, and Betrayal Among the New York Intellectuals University of Chicago Press, 2001, ISBN 0-226-46893-3
- Podhoretz, Norman (1967). "The Family Tree". Making It. New York: Random House. pp. 109–136. OCLC 292070.
- Wald, Alan M. (1987). The New York Intellectuals: The Rise and Decline of the Anti-Stalinist Left from the 1930s to the 1980s. University of North Carolina Press. ISBN 0-8078-4169-2.
