= Shirley Toulson =

British poet, writer and journalist (1924–2018)

- Born: Kathleen Shirley Dixon; 20 May 1924; Henley-on-Thames, England
- Died: 23 September 2018 (aged 94)
- Education: Birkbeck, University of London
- Occupations: Writer, poet, journalist and local politician
- Spouses: Norman Toulson (m. 1944; div. 1951); Alan Brownjohn (m. 1960; div. 1969)

Kathleen Shirley Toulson (née Dixon; 20 May 1924 – 23 September 2018) was an English writer, poet, journalist and local politician.

== Biography ==
She attended Prior's Field School and worked with the Auxiliary Territorial Service during World War II and married Norman Toulson, an army lieutenant, in 1944: they divorced in 1951.

She then studied English at Birkbeck, University of London, and worked at Foyles bookshop before becoming a journalist. In 1960, she married poet Alan Brownjohn; they divorced in 1969.

As a poet, she was a member of The Group, an informal group of poets who met in London from the mid-1950s to the mid-1960s. Her work was included in the group's 1963 anthology A Group Anthology.

In 1962, she and her husband Alan Brownjohn were elected as Labour councillors in the Wandsworth London Borough Council.

Her 1973 short story 'Playground of England', appearing in the Welsh journal Planet, satirized the objectification of Wales as a tourist destination by English second-home owners.

Starting in 1977 with her book The Drovers’ Roads of Wales, Toulson was the author of several books on the subject of walking routes used by farmers moving livestock from Wales to England. She contributed a profile of the novelist Christine Brooke-Rose for a 1986 reference publication.

== Books ==
- Shadows in an Orchard (1960)
- Circumcision's Not Such a Bad Thing After All (1970)
- The Fault, Dear Brutus: A Zodiac of Sonnets (1972)
- The Drovers’ Roads of Wales (1977)
- East Anglia: Walking the Ley Lines and Ancient Tracks (1979)
- The Mendip Hills: A Threatened Landscape. London: Victor Gollancz Ltd. 1984. ISBN 0-575-03453-X. OCLC 11622237.
- Celtic Journeys (1985)
- The Celtic Alternative: A Study of the Christianity We Lost (1994)
- Walking Round Wales: The Giraldus Journey. London: Michael Joseph. 1988. ISBN 0-7181-2885-0. OCLC 18834368.
- The Companion Guide to Devon (1996)
- The Celtic Year (1996)
- The Country of Old Age: A Personal Adventure in Time (1998)
