= Elliot E. Cohen =

American magazine editor

- Born: Elliot E. Cohen; March 14, 1899; Des Moines, Iowa, U.S.
- Died: May 28, 1959 (aged 60); New York City, New York, U.S.
- Education: Yale University
- Occupations: Writer, Editor
- Employer: American Jewish Committee
- Known for: Founding editor of Commentary and Co-founder of "Menorah Journal

Elliot E. Cohen (March 14, 1899 – May 28, 1959) was the founder and first editor of Commentary.

== Early life and education ==
Cohen was born in Des Moines, Iowa and attended Yale University, where he contributed light verse to a campus humor magazine, The Yale Record.

== Career ==
=== Menorah Journal ===
In the 1930s, he was a co-editor of the Menorah Journal with Herbert Solow.

=== Commentary ===
Cohen was the founder and first editor of Commentary, then published by the American Jewish Committee, from 1945 until his death by suicide in 1959.

During his tenure at Commentary, the magazine had a liberal point of view. His editorial position was filled by Norman Podhoretz in 1960, by Neal Kozodoy in 1995, and by John Podhoretz in 2009.
