= My Favorite Husband (TV series) =

American TV sitcom (1953–1955)

- Country of origin: United States

Original release
- Network: CBS
- Release: September 12, 1953 – December 17, 1955

My Favorite Husband is an American television situation comedy that was broadcast on CBS from September 12, 1953, to December 17, 1955, with reruns aired in the summer of 1957.

== Background ==
My Favorite Husband began as a radio program broadcast on CBS from July 23, 1948, to March 31, 1951. The basis for the program was Isabel Scott Rorick's novel Mr. and Mrs. Cugat. The couple's surname was later changed to Cooper during its radio run, with Lucille Ball portraying wife Liz and Richard Denning as husband George. Plans for adapting the series to TV brought rejection of Ball's idea of having Desi Arnaz (her real-life husband) portray George. She could not convince the company that sponsored the radio version to accept that change, and executives at CBS felt that "the idea that an all-American girl like Ball would have a Cuban husband was shocking". Ball and Arnaz subsequently developed a pilot that led to the I Love Lucy series. A couple of years later, two sponsors agreed to put My Favorite Husband on TV after seeing a pilot episode.

== Overview ==
My Favorite Husband had some similarities to I Love Lucy, in which Ball starred on TV. In particular, the wife "leans to the scatterbrained side", and the husband "is both the victim and the tower of understanding". George Cooper, a Manhattan banker, and Liz lived in a nice home in the suburbs. Liz was "glamorous, sophisticated but often scatterbrained". They were wealthy, but not pretentious, in contrast to their neighbors, the Cobbs. Gilmore Cobb was a "peanut magnate", and his wife, Myra, was a "social snob". A consistent theme was the Cobbs' efforts to improve the Coopers' social image. Effective January 9, 1955, Jeff Saunders was added to the cast as an "urbane bachelor" neighbor.

A third season was in question after the series lost its sponsors at the end of the second season. A spokesperson for CBS suggested that changes might be made in the cast and other areas to provide "a fresh coat of paint" for the show. When season three began, a different actress portrayed Liz Cooper, and the Cobbs had been replaced by new neighbors, Oliver and Myra Shepard (although the same actress continued as the wife in the neighbor couple). The change in neighbors was accompanied by a diminished focus on social standing.

== Cast ==
- George Cooper - Barry Nelson
- Liz Cooper (seasons 1 and 2) - Joan Caulfield
- Liz Cooper (season 3) - Vanessa Brown
- Gillmore Cobb - Bob Sweeney
- Myra Cobb - Alix Talton
- Oliver Shepard - Dan Tobin
- Myra Shepard - Talton
- Uncle Norman Fildew - David Burns
- Jeff Saunders - Elliott Reid

=== Casting notes ===
CBS’s West Coast vice president in charge of network programs, Harry Ackerman, selected Nelson and Caulfield for the lead roles after a long, hard search. He called Nelson "the handsome, rugged American male", and said of Caulfield, "She has some kind of half-woman, half-gamin, half-childlike quality that is perfect."

The change in female leads resulted in part from Nelson's dissatisfaction with the way his character was depicted in the show's second season. He felt that George had changed from the first season's smart character into a less intelligent man. Caulfield recalled that Nelson stayed silent during one rehearsal until she confronted him, asking, "Barry, what on earth is the matter with you?" He replied, "It's nothing personal," and the rehearsal was canceled. Later, in an interview, he "said he was fed up and had handed in his notice." Meanwhile, Caulfield asked for a release, citing as one reason that her husband had said he would obtain a divorce if she continued her six-days-per-week schedule. By the time the third season began, Caulfield was replaced. Nelson remained after CBS exercised an option in his contract, and he felt that George's character was being restored to what it had been in the first season.

== Production ==
My Favorite Husband was produced by Desilu Productions, Incorporated. Producers included Douglas Whitney and Edmund Hartmann. Directors included Eddie Buzzell, George Cahan and Norman Tokar. Writers included Sol Saks, Nate Monaster, Shirley Gordon, William Cowley, and Bud Grossman. Some sources indicate that Don Quinn was involved with the series as script supervisor or as head writer. Quinn, however, corrected such misconceptions in a letter published in the trade publication Variety. In the letter Quinn said that the erroneous credit was "embarrassing to me" and "I regret and deplore the misinformation".

The series was initially broadcast on Saturdays from 9:30 to 10 p.m. Eastern Time. In October 1955 it was moved to Tuesdays from 10:30 to 11 p.m. E. T. The 1957 reruns were on Sundays from 7:30 to 8 p.m. E. T. CBS announced on November 8, 1955, that the series would end on December 27, 1955, at the conclusion of the 13-week cycle. The New York Times reported, "C. B. S. officials were reluctant to give specific reasons for the decision, but one did venture that 'a very poor press reception' was one of the reasons."

The series originated from CBS's Television City in Hollywood. During its first two seasons, the show was broadcast live with a studio audience that produced the laughter that was heard on broadcasts. That technique differed from the trend that had most situation comedies from Hollywood produced on film. Caulfield described doing live TV as "a happy combination of stage and motion picture techniques. Every show is like an opening night." Nelson described acting on live TV as "too much of a grind ... a dull, tedious business". The series's first color episode was broadcast on September 25, 1954. Production changed from live to film effective with the October 4, 1955, episode. In December 1955 CBS-TV Film Sales offered the 13 filmed episodes for sale as reruns.

== Sponsors ==
My Favorite Husband debuted with Simmons Company and International Silver Company as sponsors. Early in 1955 Procter & Gamble (P & G) became an alternate-week sponsor, replacing International Silver Company. The New York Times reported that International Silver was "said to be quite happy with the quality of the show" but felt that TV screens did not reproduce well the patterns and designs of its silverware. By May 1955 P & G sought another program to replace My Favorite Husband. General Motors bought the Tuesday time slot in the summer of 1955 with My Favorite Husband under consideration to occupy it. It followed through by sponsoring My Favorite Husband for the company's Frigidaire division.

== Critical response ==
In a review of the premiere episode of My Favorite Husband, Jack Gould wrote in The New York Times that the program appeared to be a hit, citing the relatively realistic dialog and plot situation. Acknowledging the similarity to I Love Lucy, Gould said that the new show's premiere "should prove once again that the key to success in situation-comedy is not so much what you do as how you do it". He noted that the characters seemed realistic, rather than the "mere caricatures in zanyism" that caused many situation comedies to fail. The review said, "Joan Caulfield is sublimely videogenic in the principal role" and added, "what is more, she can handle herself in light comedy of a not too demanding order. She captures the quality of skittishness but also makes Liz seem warm and thoroughly feminine."

David Westheimer, writing in The Houston Post, called the premiere episode "bright but routine", as it "had some good lines but the usual broad brush was frequently evident". He thought that the program was better than average for a situation comedy, primarily because of Caulfield and Nelson.

Bob Foster wrote in October 1953 in the San Mateo Times that My Favorite Husband was the best of the situation comedies introduced that fall, calling it "the first real competitor for I Love Lucy". Foster's review focused on Caulfield, describing her as "a natural for television" and saying that the show "is rapidly establishing" her "as one of television's brighter lights".

Syndicated critic John Crosby commented, "Miss Caulfield is a cute chick who looks as if she might outwit a reasonably stupid husband. Barry Nelson is reasonably stupid as the husband". He described the supporting roles as "very aptly played".

In April 1954 Variety called My Favorite Husband "one of those rare marriages of people and material, all blending perfectly into a charming and top quality whole". It credited Saks for "a creative writing assist whereby the humor and comedy is never predicated on jokes but on basic situations".

By mid-October 1954, syndicated columnist Eve Starr wrote that My Favorite Husband "has let us down pretty hard" and was no longer her favorite situation comedy. She blamed the writing for that change, noting that Caulfield and Nelson "were good, are good, and will continue to be when given half a chance". Although the writers were the same as in the first season, she said episodes' content that was "so sparkling last year is sadly under par".

A Variety review of the first season three episode called it "an auspicious return" for the program and "a potent argument" for using film for TV series. It noted that Nelson "ably demonstrates that a situation comedy husband can have charm and intelligence" and that his TV wife's character "maintains the beguiling combination of wit, femininity and attractive sex which has become a hallmark of the role" as Brown debuted in the role of Liz. The review pointed out some flaws in the script but found the episode overall to be "a pleasant TV evening's entertainment".

In November 1955, Gould wrote about the series's upcoming cancellation, saying that what had been "very often a bright show" had "descended to a level of intriguing implausibility".
