= Wallace Markfield =

American novelist

Wallace Markfield (August 12, 1926 – May 24, 2002) was an American comic novelist best known for his first novel, To an Early Grave (1964), about four men who spend the day driving across Brooklyn to their friend's funeral. He is also known for Teitlebaum's Window (1970), about a Jewish boy growing up in Brooklyn in the 1930s and 1940s. Markfield was awarded a Guggenheim Fellowship in 1965 after the publication of To an Early Grave.

== Life ==
Markfield was born in Brooklyn, New York, and graduated from Abraham Lincoln High School, earning a B.A. from Brooklyn College in 1947, then doing his graduate work at New York University between 1948 and 1950. While giving a lecture on "Stéphane Mallarmé and Alienation" at the City College of New York, Markfield was interrupted by potato salad splattering suddenly onto his face. The disruptive potato salad, thrown by Carl Solomon and two of Solomon's friends, including future National LGBTQ Task Force co-founder Ron Gold, was an effective demonstration of the principles of Dadaism, one of the subjects Markfield was discussing in his lecture. Many in the audience did not appreciate the irony. The potato salad incident would later be immortalized in Allen Ginsberg's famous poem, Howl. In 1948 Markfield married Anna May Goodman; the couple had a daughter named Andrea. He later taught creative writing at San Francisco State College (1966–68), Kirkland College (1968–69), and Queens College (1971–73). At the time of his death he had been working on a novel for eleven years. Markfield died of a heart attack in Roslyn, New York, on May 24, 2002. Anna tried to get his last novel published, but his agent Candida Donadio had died Jan 20, 2001, and her successor showed no interest. Eventually Andrea published it electronically.

== Work ==
In addition to To an Early Grave and Teitelbaum's Window Markfield also wrote You Could Live If They Let You (1974), Multiple Orgasms (1977) and Radical Surgery (1991). The 1991 thriller was already conceived by the end of the 1970s. Throughout his writing career, Markfield also contributed at least 40 articles to periodicals. Dalkey Archive Press reissued Teitelbaum's Window in October 1999 and To an Early Grave in December 2000.

=== Multiple Orgasms ===
In an interview conducted in the spring of 1978 at Markfield's home in Port Washington, New York he said: "[Multiple Orgasms] was a first person narrative, completely through the eyes of a woman. I found it awfully tiresome after a while, though I never find women tiresome. But she became just a great bore to me. After about a hundred and seventy-five pages or so, I just gave up. It was getting nowhere." It was published only as a limited edition of about three hundred copies, individually numbered and signed by the author.

== Release details ==
- 1964 To an Early Grave (ISBN 1-56478-261-1)
- 1970 Teitelbaum's Window (ISBN 1-56478-219-0)
- 1974 You Could Live If They Let You
- 1977 Multiple Orgasms
- 1991 Radical Surgery
- 2024 The Trojan Jew (ISBN 978-1-962461-09-2)

== Cinema ==
In 1968 To an Early Grave was adapted for the screen under the title Bye Bye Braverman, directed by Sidney Lumet and starring George Segal and Jack Warden.

== Sources ==
- The Wallace Markfield Papers
