= Commentary (magazine) =

American magazine

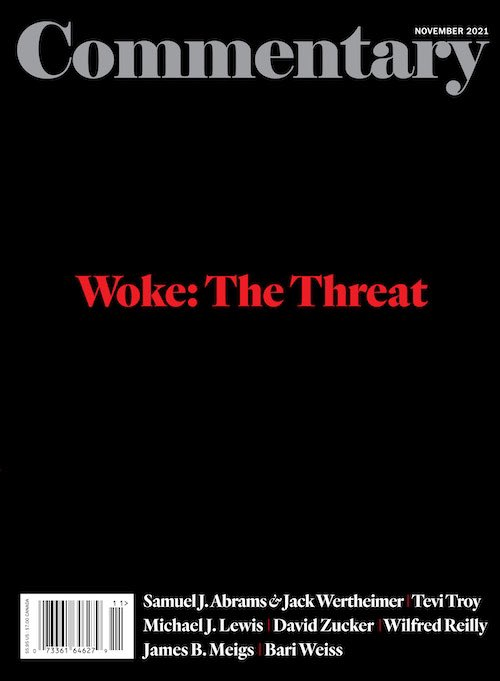
- Cover of November 2021 issue
- Editor: John Podhoretz
- Executive editor: Abe Greenwald
- Former editors: Norman Podhoretz
- Frequency: 11 issues / year (monthly, but with a combined July–August issue)
- Circulation: 26,000 (2017)
- First issue: 1945; 81 years ago
- Company: Commentary Inc.
- Country: United States
- Based in: New York City, New York, U.S.
- Language: English
- Website: commentary.org
- ISSN: 0010-2601
- OCLC: 488561243

Commentary is a conservative American magazine on religion, Judaism, Israel, politics, and social and cultural issues. Founded by the American Jewish Committee in 1945 under Elliot E. Cohen, who served as editor from 1945 to 1959, Commentary magazine developed into the leading post-World War II journal of Jewish affairs. It strove to construct a new American Jewish identity while processing the events of the Holocaust, the formation of the State of Israel, and the Cold War. Norman Podhoretz edited the magazine from 1960 to 1995. His son, John Podhoretz, is the current editor.

Besides its coverage of cultural issues, Commentary provided a voice for the anti-Stalinist left. As Podhoretz shifted from a liberal Democrat to neoconservatism in the 1970s and 1980s, he moved the magazine with him to the right and toward the Republican Party.

== History ==
=== Founding ===
Commentary was the successor to the Contemporary Jewish Record, which was published by the American Jewish Committee (AJC) and ran from 1938 to 1945, when its editor, AJC executive secretary Morris Waldman, retired.

=== 20th century ===
In 1944, with the Record's editor retiring, the AJC consulted with New York City intellectuals including Daniel Bell and Lionel Trilling; they recommended that the AJC hire Elliot E. Cohen, who had been the editor of a Jewish cultural magazine and was then a fundraiser, to start a new journal. Cohen designed Commentary to reconnect assimilated Jews and Jewish intellectuals with the broader, more traditional, and very liberal Jewish community.

At the same time, the magazine was designed to bring young Jewish New York intellectuals' ideas to a wider audience. It demonstrated that Jewish intellectuals, and by extension all American Jews, had turned away from their past political radicalism to embrace mainstream U.S. culture and values. Cohen stated his design in the first issue:

With Europe devastated, there falls upon us here in the United States a far greater share of the responsibility for carrying forward, in a creative way, our common Jewish cultural and spiritual heritage...to harmonize heritage and country into a true sense of at-home-ness.

Although many or even most of the editors and writers had been socialists, Trotskyites, or Stalinists in the past, that was no longer tolerated. Commentary articles were anti-Communist and anti-McCarthyite; they identified and attacked any perceived weakness among liberals on Cold War issues, backing President Harry Truman's policies such as the Truman Doctrine, the Marshall Plan, and NATO. The "soft-on-Communism" position of the Congress of Industrial Organizations (CIO) and Henry A. Wallace came under steady attack. Liberals who hated Joseph McCarthy were annoyed when Irving Kristol wrote at the height of the controversy that "there is one thing that the American people know about Senator McCarthy: he, like them, is unequivocally anti-Communist. About the spokesmen for American liberalism, they feel they know no such thing."

Cohen brought on board strong editors who themselves wrote important essays, including Kristol; art critic Clement Greenberg; film and cultural critic Robert Warshow; and sociologist Nathan Glazer. Commentary also published work by Hannah Arendt, Daniel Bell, Sidney Hook, and Irving Howe.

In the late 1950s, the magazine's quality sagged, as Cohen became mentally ill and died by suicide.

Norman Podhoretz, a protégé of Lionel Trilling, took over in 1960, running the magazine until his retirement in 1995. Podhoretz said that Commentary was founded to lead the Jewish intellectuals "out of the desert of alienation...and into the promised land of democratic, pluralistic, and prosperous America".

The emergence of the New Left, which was hostile to President Lyndon B. Johnson, capitalism, and universities, angered Podhoretz with what he perceived as its shallowness and hostility to Israel in the 1967 Six-Day War. Articles attacked the New Left on matters including crime, the nature of art, drugs, poverty, and the new egalitarianism; Commentary said the New Left was a dangerous anti-American, anti-liberal, and antisemitic force. Daniel Patrick Moynihan used Commentary to attack the Watts riots and liberals who defended it as a just revolution.

=== 21st century ===
In 2007, the magazine ended its affiliation with the AJC when Commentary, Inc., an independent 501(c)(3) nonprofit enterprise, took over as publisher.

In 2011, the journal donated its archives from 1945 to 1995 to the Harry Ransom Center at the University of Texas at Austin. These included letters and essay revisions.

== Reception and influence ==
American-Israeli journalist and former Commentary editor Benjamin Balint has called it the "contentious magazine that transformed the Jewish left into the neoconservative right". Historian and literary critic Richard Pells said that "no other journal of the past half century has been so consistently influential, or so central to the major debates that have transformed the political and intellectual life of the United States."
