= Tess Slesinger =

American screenwriter

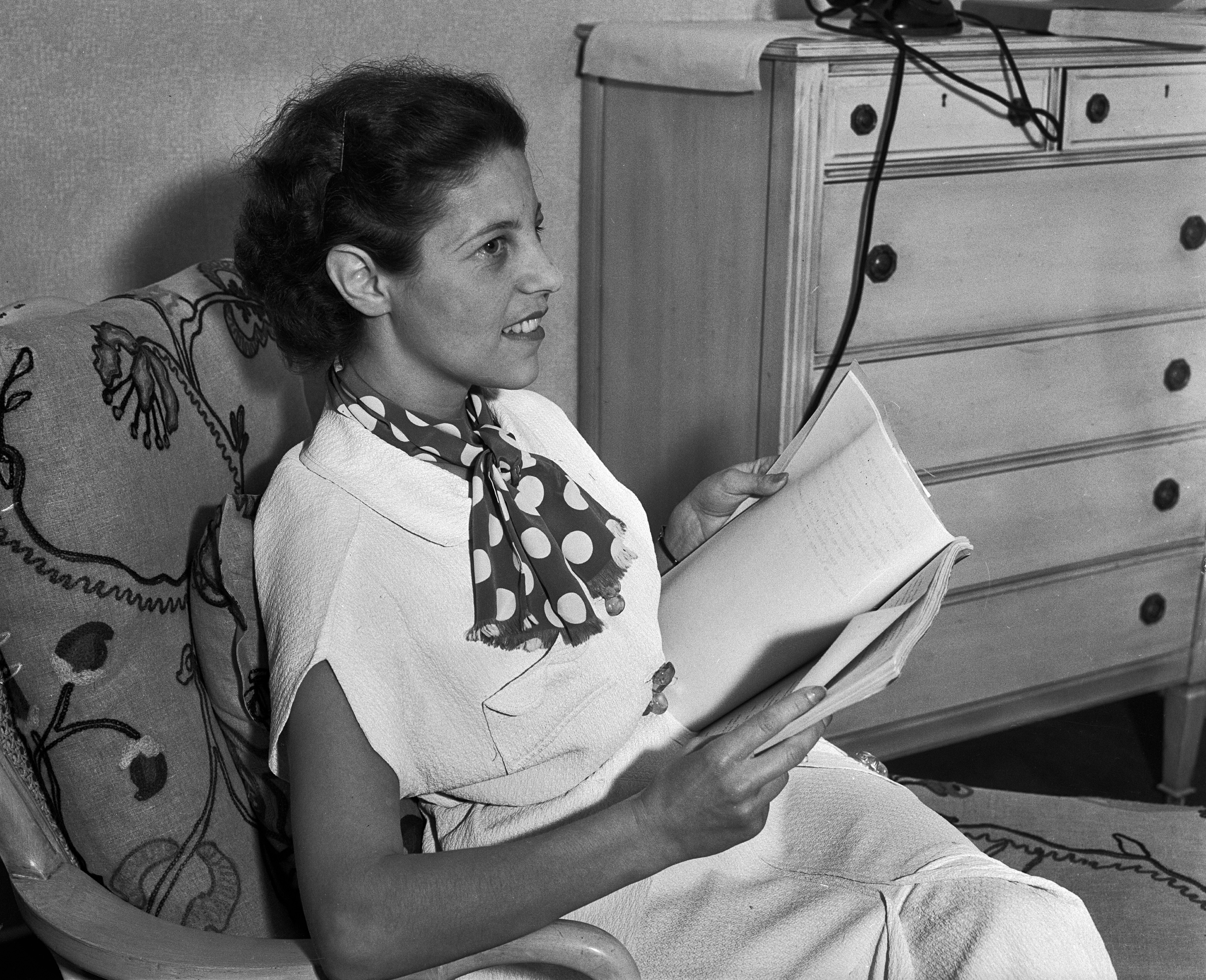
- Born: July 16, 1905; New York City, New York, U.S.
- Died: February 21, 1945 (aged 39); Los Angeles, California, U.S.
- Occupations: Writer, screenwriter

Theresa "Tess" Slesinger (July 16, 1905 – February 21, 1945) was an American writer and screenwriter and a member of the New York intellectual scene.

== Life and career ==
She was born as Theresa Slesinger in New York City, as the fourth child of Anthony Slesinger, a Hungarian-born dress manufacturer, and Augusta (née Singer) Slesinger, a welfare worker who later (after 1931) became a prominent psychoanalyst. Her family was Jewish. She was the younger sister of three brothers, including Stephen Slesinger, later the creator of Red Ryder. She was educated at Ethical Culture Fieldston School from September 1912 until June 1922, Swarthmore College and the Columbia University School of Journalism in New York.

In December 1932, Story magazine published her short story "Missis Flinders", which was based on Slesinger's own experience of having an abortion, and may have been the first short story to appear in a large-circulation periodical to address the theme explicitly. Encouraged to expand the story, Slesinger incorporated it as the final chapter of her only novel, The Unpossessed (1934).

The novel also satirizes the New York left-wing milieu in which she then lived. A modern edition describes it as "a cutting comedy about hard times, bad jobs, lousy marriages, little magazines, high principles, and the morning after" with "a cast of litterateurs, layabouts, lotharios, academic activists, and fur-clad patrons of protest and the arts." She helped to establish the Screen Writers Guild in 1933.

Her first husband was Herbert Solow, who was a staff writer on the Menorah Journal. After marrying her second husband, screenwriter Frank Davis, she moved to California in 1935; with Davis she had two children. Slesinger was responsible for the screenplays, among others, of The Good Earth (1937) and, at the end of her life, she adapted A Tree Grows in Brooklyn (1946) with Davis, which won them an Oscar nomination for Best Screenplay.

During the era of the Popular Front, Slesinger was a supporter of the American Communist Party. Her name was among those included on the letter denouncing the Dewey Commission's investigation of the Moscow Trials, and she also endorsed the CP-initiated call for the Third American Writers' Congress in 1939. However, like many other leftist intellectuals of the time, Slesinger grew disillusioned with the Soviet Union in the wake of the Hitler-Stalin Pact of 1939. Maxim Lieber served as her literary agent, 1933–1937, and in 1941.

== Death ==
Tess Slesinger died from cancer at the age of 39. The children from her second marriage are Peter Davis, who is the writer, filmmaker and director of the Academy Award-winning documentary Hearts and Minds (1974), and Jane Davis, a wellness and mind-body specialist.

== Legacy ==
In James T. Farrell's novel Sam Holman (1983), there are thinly veiled fictional portraits of many prominent New York intellectuals; the character of "Frances Dunsky" is reportedly based on Slesinger.

== Works ==
=== Books ===
- The Unpossessed (Simon & Schuster, 1934) novel, reprinted 1984, 1993, 2012
- Time: the Present (Simon and Schuster, 1935) short story collection
- On Being Told That Her Second Husband Has Taken His First Lover and Other Stories ISBN 9780812901764 (Quadrangle Books, 1971, reprinted 1975, 1990), a reprint of Time: the Present with one additional story

=== Screenplays ===
- The Bride Wore Red (1937)
- The Good Earth (1937)
- Girls' School (1938)
- Dance, Girl, Dance (1940)
- Remember the Day (1941)
- Are Husbands Necessary? (1942)
- A Tree Grows in Brooklyn (1945)

=== Stories ===
Title	Publication	Collected in
"Mother to Dinner"	The Menorah Journal (March 1930)	Time: The Present
"White on Black"	The American Mercury (December 1930)	Time: The Present
"The Friedmans' Annie"	The Menorah Journal (March 1931)	Time: The Present
"Young Wife"	This Quarter (April–June 1931)	-
"Brother to the Happy"	Pagany (January–March 1932)	-
"Missis Flinders"	Story (December 1932)	Time: The Present
"Relax Is All"	Forum and Century (August 1933)	Time: The Present
"Ben Grader Makes a Call"	Vanity Fair (June 1934)	-
"The Old Lady Counts Her Injuries"	Vanity Fair (October 1934)	-
"After the Cure"	Vanity Fair (January 1935)	-
"The Times So Unsettled Are"	Redbook (March 1935)	Time: The Present
"Jobs in the Sky"	Scribner's (March 1935)	Time: The Present
"On Being Told That Her Second Husband Has Taken His First Lover"	Story (April 1935)	Time: The Present
"Mr. Palmer's Party"	The New Yorker (April 27, 1935)	-
"You G-i-i-ve Yourself, or Drop the Handkerchief"	Vanity Fair (May 1935)	-
"After the Party"	Time: The Present (May 1935)	Time: The Present
"The Mouse-Trap"	Time: The Present (May 1935)	Time: The Present
"The Answer on the Magnolia Tree"	Time: The Present (May 1935)	Time: The Present
"The Best Things in Life Are Three"	Vanity Fair (August 1935)	-
"A Life in the Day of a Writer"	Story (November 1935)	On Being Told That Her Second Husband Has Taken His First Lover
"For Better, for Worse"	The Delineator (January 1936)	-
