= Alan Brownjohn =

English poet and novelist (1931–2024)

Alan Brownjohn FRSL
- Born: Alan Charles Brownjohn; 28 July 1931; London, England
- Died: 23 February 2024 (aged 92)
- Education: Merton College, Oxford
- Occupations: Poet and novelist
- Spouse: Shirley Toulson (m. 1960; div. 1969)
- Writing career
- Pen name: John Berrington

Alan Charles Brownjohn FRSL (28 July 1931 – 23 February 2024) was an English poet and novelist. He also worked as a teacher, lecturer, critic and broadcaster.

== Life and work ==
Alan Charles Brownjohn was born in London, England, on 28 July 1931. He was educated at Merton College, Oxford. He taught in schools between 1957 and 1965.

In 1960 he married the writer Shirley Toulson and in 1962 both were elected as Labour councillors in the Wandsworth Metropolitan Borough Council, and Brownjohn stood as the Labour Party candidate for Richmond (Surrey) in the 1964 general election, polling in second place. He and Toulson divorced in 1969.

Brownjohn was an inspirational English teacher at Beckenham and Penge Boys Grammar School until 1965. He moved to lecture at Battersea College of Education and South Bank Polytechnic until 1979, when he became a full-time writer. He participated in Philip Hobsbaum's weekly poetry discussion meetings known as The Group, which also included Peter Porter, Martin Bell, Peter Redgrove, George MacBeth and Edward Lucie-Smith.

Brownjohn was a Patron of Humanists UK. He was elected a Fellow of the Royal Society of Literature in 1999.

Reviewing Brownjohn's Collected Poems (Enitharmon Press, 2006), Anthony Thwaite wrote in The Guardian: "...he is a social poet in the sense that if people in the future want to know what many lives were like in the second half of the 20th century, they should read Alan Brownjohn - observant, troubled, humane, scrupulous, wry, funny."

Alan Brownjohn died on 23 February 2024, at the age of 92.

== Bibliography ==
- Travellers Alone (1954), poems
- The Railings (1961), poems
- To Clear the River (1964), novel, as John Berrington
- Penguin Modern Poets 14 (1965), with Michael Hamburger, Charles Tomlinson
- The Lions' Mouths (1967)
- A Day by Indirections (1969), broadsheet poem
- First I Say This: A Selection of Poems for Reading Aloud (1969), editor
- Sandgrains On A Tray (1969)
- Woman Reading Aloud (1969) broadsheet poem
- Synopsis (1970)
- Brownjohn's Beasts (1970)
- Transformation Scene (1971) broadside poem
- An Equivalent (1971) poem
- New Poems 1970-71. A P.E.N. Anthology of Contemporary Poetry (1971), edited with Seamus Heaney and Jon Stallworthy
- Warrior's Career (1972)
- She Made of It (1974)
- A Song of Good Life (1975)
- Philip Larkin (1975)
- New Poetry 3, Arts Council anthology (1977), edited with Maureen Duffy
- A Night in the Gazebo (1980)
- Nineteen Poems (1980)
- Collected Poems 1952–1983 (1983)
- The Old Flea-Pit (1987)
- The Observation Car (1990), poems
- The Gregory Anthology 1987–1990 (1990), editor with K. W. Gransden
- The Way You Tell Them: A Yarn of the Nineties (1990), novel
- Inertia Reel (1992), broadside poem
- In the Cruel Arcade (1994)
- The Long Shadows (1997), novel
- Horace by Pierre Corneille (1997), translator
- The Cat without E-mail (Enitharmon Press 2001)
- A Funny Old Year (2001), novel
- The Men Around Her Bed (Enitharmon Press, 2004)
- Windows on the Moon (2009), novel
- Ludbrooke and Others (Enitharmon Press, 2010)
- A Bottle and Other Poems (Enitharmon Press, 2015)
- parrot poem
