= Alan M. Wald =

American academic, writer

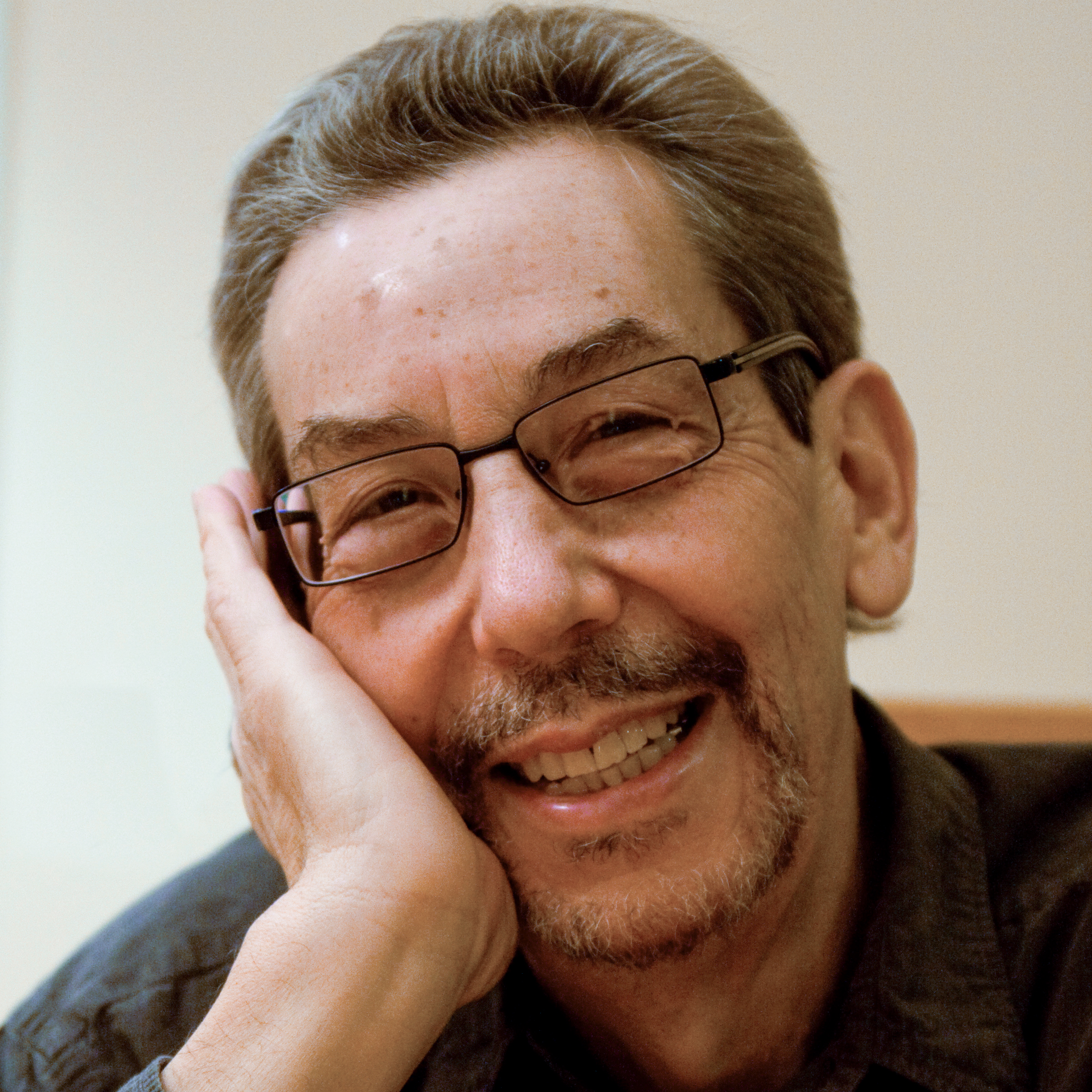
- Born: Alan Maynard Wald; June 1, 1946 (age 80); Washington, DC, USA
- Education: Antioch College
- Alma mater: University of California at Berkeley
- Occupations: Professor, writer, researcher
- Spouses: Celia Stodola (1975–1992, her death), Angela Dillard (since 2007)
- Children: 2 daughters
- Writing career
- Language: English
- Years active: 1974–Present
- Period: 20th-Century American literature
- Notable work: The New York Intellectuals
- Notable awards: ACA Mary C. Turpie Prize, Longfellow House Resident Fellow, Guggenheim Fellowship, ACLS Fellow

Alan Maynard Wald (born June 1, 1946) is an American professor emeritus of English Literature and American Culture at the University of Michigan, Ann Arbor, and writer of 20th-century American literature who focuses on Communist writers; he is an expert on the American 20th-Century "Literary Left."

== Background ==
Alan M. Wald was born in Washington, DC. His parents were Haskell Philip Wald, an economist with the Federal Government and Federal Reserve Bank, and Ruth Jacobs, a special education teacher.

In 1969, he received a BA in Literature from Antioch College. In 1971, he received an MA and, in 1974, a doctorate, both in English from the University of California at Berkeley. Frederick C. Crews directed his doctoral dissertation.

== Career ==
=== Professor ===
Wald taught English Literature and American Culture for four full decades. In 1974, he became a lecturer at San Jose State University. In 1975, he became an associate in English at his alma mater, the University of California at Berkeley. In 1975, he began his career at the University of Michigan in Ann Arbor, first as assistant professor (1975–1981), associate professor (1981–1986), and professor (1986–2014). He also served as director of the Program in American Culture (2000–2003) and as H. Chandler Davis Collegiate Professor (2007–2014). He retired as professor emeritus on May 31, 2014.

=== Writer ===
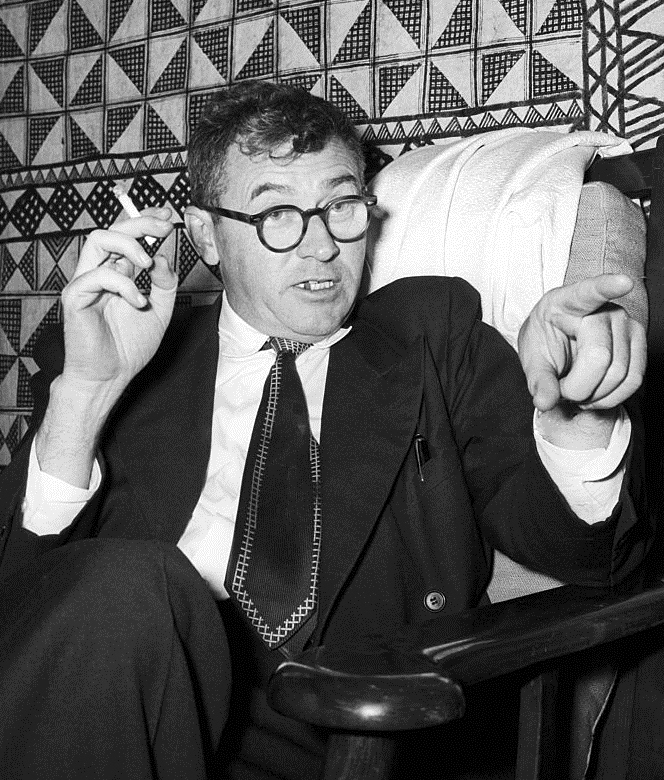
James T. Farrell (1950s), subject of Wald's first major book

As not only professor but also researcher and writer, Wald's subjects have included: 20th Century United States Literature; Realism, Naturalism, Modernism in Mid-20th Century U.S. Literature; Literary Radicalism in the United States; Marxism and U.S. Cultural Studies; African American Writers on the Left; Modernist Poetry and the Left; the 1930s (Literature); New York Jewish Writers and Intellectuals; 20th-Century History of Socialist, Communist, Trotskyist and New Left Movements in the U.S.; the 1960s Politics and Culture; Cold War Culture and Resistance; Old Left/New Left in U.S. Politics and Culture; and Film Noir and the Left.

People about whom he is considered an expert and scholar include: James T. Farrell, Richard Wright, Mike Gold, Lorraine Hansberry, and John Brooks Wheelwright among many other writers on the Left. Some of the hitherto lesser known writers in whom he has expertise include: Ann Petry, Jo Sinclair, and Willard Motley.

=== Activist ===
Wald has been a self-proclaimed political activist ("radical activist") since high school, when he read books by Richard Wright and James T. Farrell, as well as Dalton Trumbo's novel ‘’Johnny Got His Gun’’. In college, his own radicalism–and intellectual interests–crystalized upon reading Daniel Aaron's Writers on the Left (1961). In the late 1960s, Wald became a "devoted reader" of New Left Review. In 1971, he ran for city council in Berkeley, California, for the Socialist Workers Party.

In 1986, he co-founded the Marxist-Feminist-Antiracist "Solidarity" and continues to serve as an editor for its journal, Against the Current. In 1997, he joined the editorial board of Science & Society: A Journal of Marxist Thought and Analysis (founded 1936). Throughout his nearly four-decade affiliation with the University of Michigan, his activism includes support for the: Washtenaw County Coalition Against Apartheid, Latin American Solidarity Committee, Palestine Human Rights Campaign, and United Coalition Against Racism.

On 16 March 1986, Wald was arrested for partaking in a "sit-in" at the office of Rep. Carl Pursell (R-Ann Arbor) to protest his support for President Ronald Reagan's plan to send $100 million to the counter-revolutionary Contras in Nicaragua. Wald was tried and convicted. As late as 1987, the ‘’New York Times’’ characterized Wald's political orientation as Trotskyist. His activism continues, demonstrated by his signature on a 2016 "anti-intolerance statement."

== Personal ==
Wald identifies himself as having a "secular Jewish identity."

In 1975, he married Celia Stodola (1946–1992), who became a practicing nurse in the Obstetrical Unit of the Women's Hospital at the University of Michigan, Ann Arbor. Sarah and Hannah are their two daughters.

In 2001, he began a relationship with former student Angela D. Dillard, then a professor of African-American History at New York University. They became engaged when she took a position at the University of Michigan in 2006. They married in 2007.

== Awards and grants ==
Awards and grants received by Wald include:

- 2012: American Studies Association's Mary C. Turpie Prize
- 2011–2012: National Endowment for the Humanities
- 2004: Longfellow House Resident Fellow
- 1999–2000: Guggenheim Fellowship
- 1989: Yale University Beinecke Fellow
- 1983–1984: American Council of Learned Societies
- 1976: American Council of Learned Societies
- 1969: Woodrow Wilson Fellow

== Legacy ==
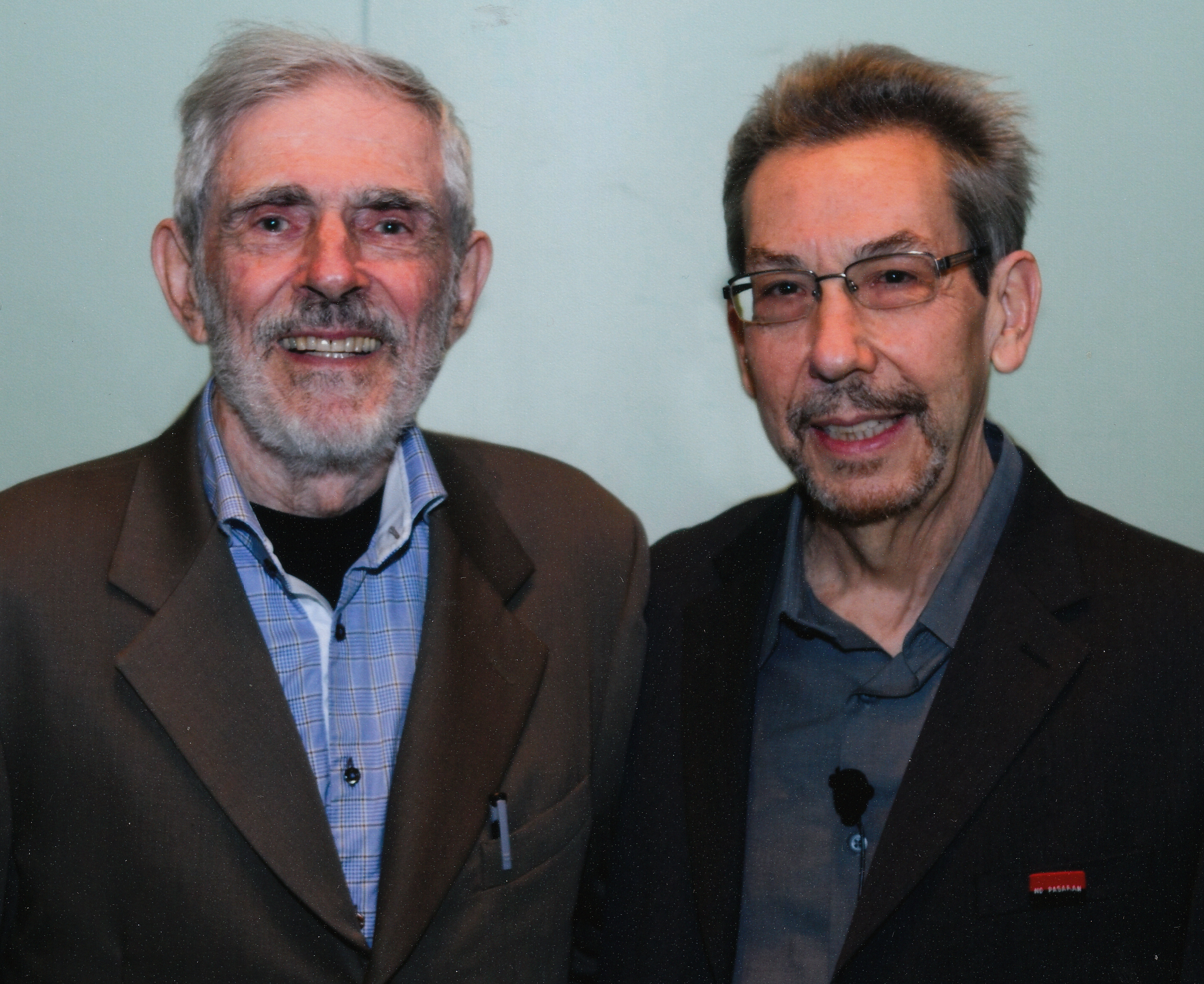
Wald with Chandler Davis (2011)

Upon his retirement, the Regents of the University of Michigan saluted Wald a "distinguished teacher and researcher by naming Alan M. Wald professor emeritus of English language and literature and professor emeritus of American culture," stating:

Professor Wald examined the varied currents of U.S. leftwing politics and radical esthetics, captured the specificity of writers' lives both renowned and rediscovered by his own investigations, and widened the corpus of U.S. literature to include writers across all lines of race, gender, class, and sexuality... served as director of the Program in American Culture (2000-03) and played an instrumental role in establishing the department as a leader in multicultural scholarship... [and] worked to assure racial equality in all aspects of University life and to preserve academic freedom.

In March 2013, the University of Michigan held a two-day conference in honor of Wald's four decades of work, called "Lineages of the Literary Left: A Symposium in Honor of Alan M. Wald." Speakers included Tariq Ali and Michael Löwy. Proceedings were published as Lineages of the Literary Left: Essays in Honor of Alan M. Wald by the University of Michigan's Maize Books.

In 2007, he was appointed Collegiate Professor by the Regents and named his chair in honor of Chandler Davis, mathematician – and one-time political prisoner, after being fired from the University of Michigan and followed by blacklisting). In 2011, he presented a lecture under the auspices of this position which was attended by the 85-year-old Davis. In 2022, he wrote Davis' obituary for Jacobin (magazine).

Students of Wald's include:

- Howard Brick, Louis Evans Professor of History, University of Michigan
- Robbie Lieberman, Professor of American Studies and Chair of the Interdisciplinary Studies Department, Kennesaw State University
- Paula Rabinowitz, Professor Emerita of English Literature and American Studies, University of Minnesota

Regarding his lifelong activism, Wald has stated, "I have always been a bit player in these events, never a leader."

== Works ==
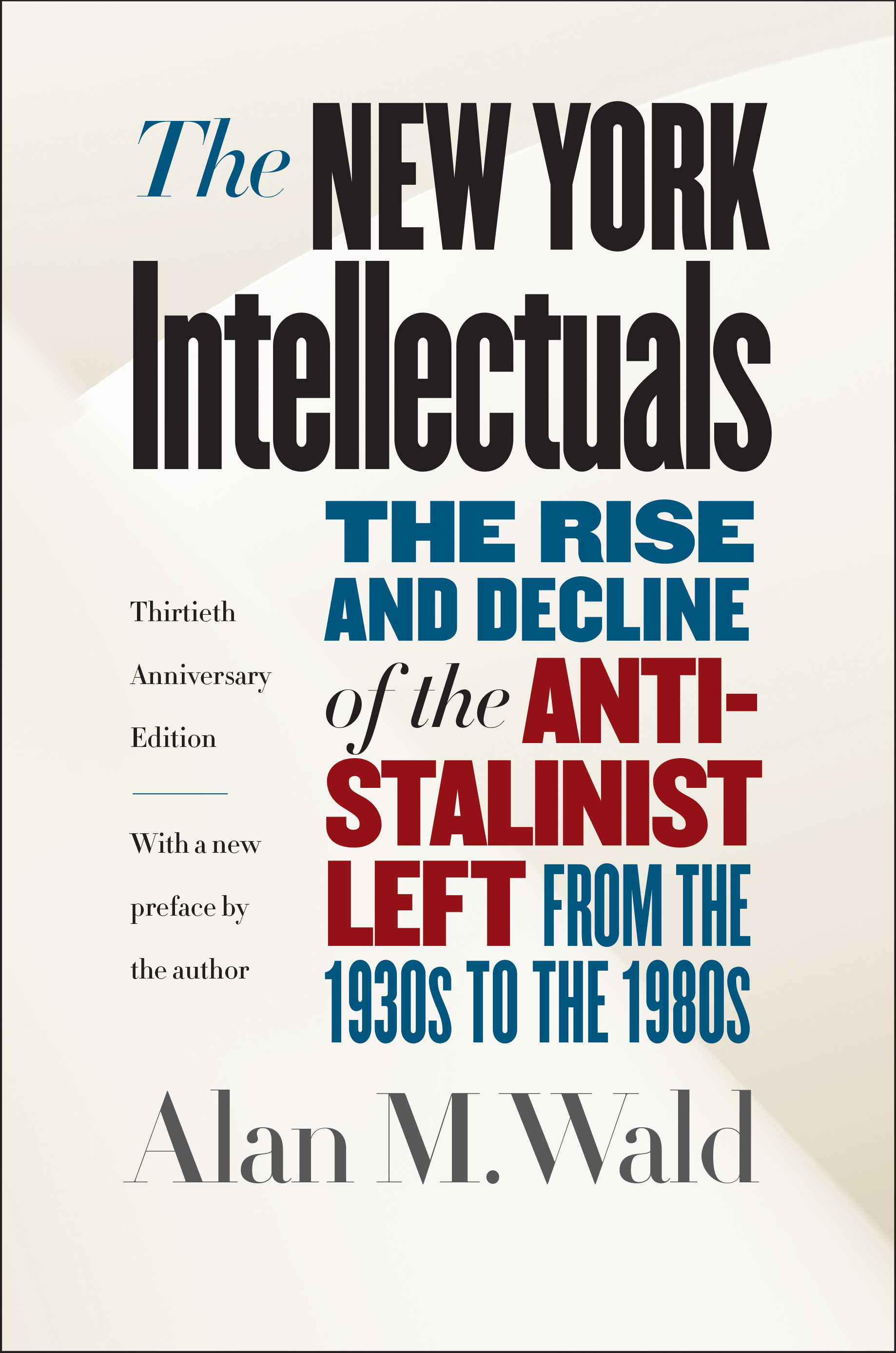
The New York Intellectuals (2017, 30th edition) by Alan M. Wald

The New York Intellectuals (1987) and Writing From the Left (1994) form part of some half-dozen major works that chronicle the literature of the Left in the 20th-Century USA:

- James T. Farrell: The Revolutionary Socialist Years (New York: New York University, 1978)
- The Revolutionary Imagination: The Poetry and Politics of John Wheelwright and Sherry Mangan (Chapel Hill: University of North Carolina Press, 1983)
- The New York Intellectuals: The Rise and Decline of the Anti-Stalinist Left from the 1930s to the 1980s (Chapel Hill: University of North Carolina Press, 1987, 2017)
- The Responsibility of Intellectuals: Selected Essays on Marxist Traditions in Cultural Commitment (Atlantic Highlands, N. J.: Humanities Press, 1992; paperback, 1995)
- Writing From the Left: New Essays on Radical Culture and Politics (London and New York: Verso, 1994)
- "Literary Left Trilogy":
  - Exiles From a Future Time (2002)
  - Trinity of Passion: The Literary Left and the Antifascist Crusade (Chapel Hill: University of North Carolina Press, 2007)
  - American Night: The Literary Left in the Era of the Cold War (Chapel Hill: University of North Carolina Press, 2012)

He has contributed chapters to books and many published essays.

Articles:

- "When Max Eastman Was Young" in Jacobin (2018)

== See also ==
- New York Intellectuals
- League of American Writers
- List of members of the League of American Writers
- John Reed Club
- James T. Farrell
- Richard Wright
- John Brooks Wheelwright
- Lorraine Hansberry
- Mike Gold
- Trotskyism
- English-language press of the Communist Party USA
- International Publishers
- Proletarian literature
- New Masses
- Partisan Review
- Bibliography on American Communism

== External sources ==
- Alan Wald
- Library of Congress
- Gale Contemporary Authors Online
- University of North Carolina Press
- Academia.edu
