= Rose Laub Coser =

German-American sociologist, educator and social justice activist

- Born: May 4, 1916; Berlin, Germany
- Died: August 21, 1994 (aged 78); Wellfleet, Massachusetts
- Education: Columbia University
- Known for: Work on role theory, medical sociology, and sociology of the family
- Spouse: Lewis A. Coser
- Children: Ellen Coser Perrin and Steven Coser
- Scientific career
- Fields: Sociology
- Workplaces: State University of New York at Stony Brook and Harvard University
- Thesis: (1957)
- Doctoral advisor: Robert S. Lynd and Robert Merton

Rose Laub Coser (born May 4, 1916 – August 21, 1994) was a German-American sociologist, educator, and social justice activist. She taught sociology at the State University of New York at Stony Brook from 1968 until her retirement in 1987. She was interested in the effect of social structures on individuals, and much her work fell within medical sociology, role theory, and sociology of the family.

== Early life and family ==
Rose Laub Coser was born on May 4, 1916, in Berlin, Germany. She is a daughter of Rachel Lea (Lachowsky) Loeb and Elias Laub, a Polish printer and publisher. Her parents were passionate socialists and knew Rosa Luxemburg well. They named their first-born daughter Rose in honor of Luxemburg. Coser grew in a socialist environment upheld by her parents. In 1924, the family moved to Antwerp, Belgium. In Antwerp, Rose Laub lost her younger sister to an accidental death. Then, due to the Nazi threat, the Laubs emigrated to New York City, U.S. in 1939.

Rose Laub married Lewis A. Coser on August 25, 1942. Coser was a refugee who shared a common commitment to socialism with Laub and later became a noted sociologist. Laub and Coser bore two children, Ellen Coser Perrin, who later became a professor of pediatrics at the University of Massachusetts Medical School, and Steven Coser, who later became a computer scientist.

== Education ==
Rose Laub Coser studied philosophy at the École Libre des Hautes Étude, which is a Parisian institution that relocated to the New School for Social Research in New York City during the Nazi years. She began to work in the field of psychology by assisting researches of psychoanalyst and experimental child psychologist René Spitz and working for David Riesman on his study of political apathy, called The Lonely Crowd (1950) and Faces in The Crowd (1952). She then attended Columbia University and studied sociology, along with her husband Lewis A. Coser, under Robert S. Lynd and Robert K. Merton. In 1957, Coser earned Ph.D. under the supervision of Robert K. Merton.

== Contribution ==
Coser made a number of contributions in many of the institutions she worked at. Her work at the Harvard University Medical School brought on a number of papers, including "Laughter Among Colleagues," which was about humor's social functions in mental hospitals, "Evasiveness as a Response to Structural Ambivalence," and a book, Training in Ambiguity: Social Structure and Professional Socialization in a Mental Hospital.

Coser's major contributions fall within the areas of medical sociology, role theory, sociology of the family, and contemporary gender issues (both within family and the occupational world). Her contributions to medical sociology began at the start of her career. She completed case studies on the effects that bureaucratic organization of medical work affected patients and staff in mental and medical hospitals. Playing on Merton's role theory, Coser focused on the concepts of ambiguity and multiplicity. She was an advocate for the “liberating potential of a broad modern world.” Coser redefined important concepts within role theory and applied them the role of women in the family and workplace. Coser was a passionate feminist, and launched a class-action lawsuit against SUNY, for the recoupment of wages among female faculty and staff. She has served in important positions within the Society of Social Problems and the Eastern Sociological Society. Rose Coser published many works within the fields of medical sociology, sociology of the family, and gender roles. In her book The Family: Its Structures and Functions, discusses the universality of the family structure as well as how these structures may differ depending on the society in which they exist. Her work in this book also included her ideas on the relationship between society and the family, the way that the family shapes individuals whose behaviors and attitudes are appropriate for the society in which they reside, and she even has work on alternative structures of family and the role of women in the family. She was a co-founder of the journal Dissent with Irving Howe and Lewis A. Coser, and frequently published in it. Though she was not particularly religious, Coser's Jewish background allowed her to make several contributions to and fill many gaps in literature on Jewish women.

=== Role theory ===
Coser's work on role theory, which built on the work of her mentor, Robert K. Merton, demonstrates how people in modern society may take on multiple statuses and the roles that are attached to them, thus creating a wide social repertoire. However, according to Coser, women have historically been restricted from the acquisition of multiple and diverse roles, suffering more physical confinement and political, occupational restrictions, compared to men. In her classic paper written with Lewis A. Coser, "Stay Home Little Sheba: On Placement, Displacement, and Social Change (1974)," she displays how the "greedy institution" of the family has restricted participation of women in public life and argues that denying public policies of women's access to institutionalized child reinforces social and political subordination.

The bulk of Coser's contribution within role theory is represented in Social Rules and Social Institutions, a collection of works in honor of Rose Coser. In one of these essays, "The Complexity of Roles as a Seedbed of Individual Autonomy," Coser brings together the ideas of Robert K. Merton, Ferdinand Toennies, and George Simmel within the topic of complex versus simple role-sets. Rose Coser's work has brought together the theories and ideas of different sociologists. [For example, Lewis Coser, Peter Blau, and Helena Znancieka Lopata on role-theory; Gladys Rothbell (role of housewife); Cynthia Fuchs Epstein (roles of women in law); Jeffrey Rosenhold ("role-complexity and patterns of inheritance"); William D'Antonio (immigration of Jewish Italian women and families); Arlene Daniels (privileged women); Helga Nowotny (women the field of science); Nancy Chodrow (female psychoanalysts); Ellen Coser Perrin and James Perrin (physicians and their training); and Donald Light (protection of role in medicine).]

== Works ==
Coser was a prominent sociologist who could expand and reconceptualize theoretical frameworks. She pushed and deconstructed paradigms of functional theory, role theory, and modernism to explain complex processes. Her work was always driven theoretically, and even with those substantive, she could evoke the patterned behaviors and institutional frameworks of issues that she dealt with: she crafted and refined institutional analysis, provided conceptual tools for the dissection of social problems.

After receiving her Ph.D. in sociology from Columbia University, Rose Coser worked there as a research associate. She then moved on to do research at the University of Chicago. In 1951, Coser first was an instructor and then became an assistant professor at Wellesley College where she stayed for eight years before moving on to the department of psychiatry at the Harvard Medical School as a research associate. After her time at Harvard, Coser became an associate professor at Northeastern University. In 1968, both Lewis and Rose Coser became professors at the State University of New York (SUNY) and worked there until retirement.

Coser's most prominent works Include:

- “Anti-Semitism Re-examined,” The New Leader (1951).
- "Social Problems 4," (1956).
- “Authority and Decision-Making in a Hospital,” (February 1958).
- “Laughter Among Colleagues: A Study of the Social Functions of Humor Among the Staff of a Mental Hospital,”(February 1960)
- "Life in the Ward," (1962).
- "In The Hospital in Modern Society," (1963).
- "A Case Study in a Mental Hospital," (1976).
- "Structure and Functions", 1964 and 1974.
- “Evasiveness as a Response to Structural Ambivalence,” (August 1967).
- “Women in the Occupational World: Social Disruption and Conflict,” with Gerald Rokoff (1971).
- “On Nepotism and Marginality,” (1971).
- “The Principles of Legitimacy and Its Patterned Infringement,” with Lewis A. Coser. In Cross-National Family Research, edited by Mavin B. Sussman and Betty Cogswell (1972).
- "The Family: Its Life Cycle and Achievement in America," (1972).
- “The Housewife and Her Greedy Family,” with Lewis A. Coser. In Greedy Institutions, edited by Lewis Coser (1974).
- "In The Idea of Social Structure" (1975).
- "Training in Ambiguity: Learning Through Doing in a Mental Hospital," (1979).
- "Access to Power: Cross-National Studies of Women and Elites," (1981).
- “The American Family: Changing Patterns of Social Control.” In Social Control: Views from the Social Sciences, edited by Jack P. Gibbs (1982).
- "In Defense of Modernity: Complexity of Social Roles and Individual Autonomy," (1991).
- "Women of Courage: Jewish and Italian Immigrant Women in New York," (1999).

=== In Defense of Modernity: Complexity of Social Roles and Individual Autonomy, 1991 ===
In Defense of Modernity: Complexity of Social Roles and Individual Autonomy was Coser's last published book. The book is about modern society as a supportive environment for individualism against the traditional, superstitious, and repressive constraints.

== Awards and honors ==
Rose Laub Coser co-founded and frequently contributed to the journal Dissent and served for numerous times on editorial boards.

- Coser served the Society for the Study of Social Problems (SSSP) as the president from 1973 to 1974.
- Coser won a Guggenheim Fellowship in 1979.
- Coser served the American Sociological Association (ASA) as the vice president in 1986.
- Coser received Eastern Sociological Society (ESS) Merit Award in 1987.
- Coser served the Eastern Sociological Society (ESS) as the president from 1984 to 1985.

=== The Rose Laub Coser Dissertation Proposal Award ===
In honor of the president Rose Laub Coser, her family, friends, and former students established the Rose Laub Coser Award within Eastern Sociological Society (ESS). The award is annually granted to a graduate student for an outstanding doctoral dissertation proposal in the area of sociology of the family or the gender and society.
