= World of Our Fathers =

1976 history book by Irving Howe

- First edition
- Author: Irving Howe
- Language: English
- Subject: Immigrant experience of East European Jews in America
- Publisher: Harcourt Brace Jovanovich
- Publication date: 1976
- Publication place: United States
- Media type: Print (hardcover, paperback)
- Awards: National Book Award, 1977; Francis Parkman Prize, 1977; National Jewish Book Award (for Jewish History), 1977
- ISBN: 978-0151463534
- OCLC: 1500208

World of Our Fathers: The Journey of the East European Jews to America and the Life They Found and Made is a narrative history book written by the American social and literary critic Irving Howe with assistance from Kenneth Libo. First published by Harcourt Brace Jovanovich in 1976, it reached #1 on The New York Times best seller list for non-fiction, and won the 1977 U.S. National Book Award in the History category.

The 700-page book offers a sweeping account of the two million East European Jews who migrated to the United States during the four-decade period from 1880 to 1920. Howe focuses on the Lower East Side of New York City when describing the living conditions, jobs, politics, education, religious practices, and Yiddishkeit culture that Jewish immigrants found and made in the U.S.

== Summary ==
The book begins with shtetl life in the Russian Pale of Settlement, which became exceedingly perilous after the March 1881 assassination of Alexander II, czar of Russia. His death triggered a wave of pogroms targeted at Jews, and accelerated their exodus to the New World. Howe charts the immigrants' voyage to Ellis Island, and from there to the Lower East Side, the most densely populated area of New York City: "By 1890 it had 522 inhabitants per acre, by 1900 more than 700."

The "greenhorns" struggled to earn a living as sweatshop workers, pushcart peddlers, and small-time retailers. Howe depicts the tiny, crowded tenement apartments, and the sacrifices of first-generation Jewish parents, especially mothers:

In a culture where men were supposed to be—and sometimes were—concerned mainly with the rigors of learning, the mother often became the emotional center of the family, the one figure to whom all turned for comfort.

Howe examines the tension between those who wanted to practice Orthodox Judaism and those who favored secularization. He portrays the Jewish immigrants who attempted to learn the English language, but often ended up with a patois that was "neither quite English nor quite Yiddish, in which the vocabulary of the former was twisted to the syntax of the latter." He writes about the formative period of American Zionism, and its appeal to East Side "dreamers" in the Jewish diaspora.

As a well-known intellectual of the democratic socialist left, Howe recounts the unionization battles fought by immigrant workers, and singles out notable women activists and reformers such as Clara Lemlich, Rose Schneiderman, Lillian Wald, and Belle Moskowitz. He analyzes the prevalence of Jewish socialism, which he terms "a political movement dedicated to building a new society; part of a great international upsurge that began in the nineteenth century and continued into the twentieth". He links it to a messianic yearning among Jewish immigrants: "the high moral fervor they had brought with them and the hope for social betterment America aroused in them."

In a section on "The Culture of Yiddish", Howe describes the Yiddish theatre and Yiddish press. He profiles poets and writers such as Mani Leib, Abraham Cahan, Isaac Bashevis Singer, Sholem Asch, Anzia Yezierska, and the literary critic Shmuel Niger.

In the final section entitled "Dispersion", Howe chronicles the "journeys outward" from the Lower East Side ghetto to the rest of America. Initially, it was Jewish entertainers who gained a foothold in mainstream society. They were followed by novelists, painters and intellectuals until eventually Jews were entering middle-class professions and leaving the city for the suburbs.

Howe concludes the book by stating:

We need not overvalue the immigrant Jewish experience in order to feel a lasting gratitude for having been part of it. A sense of natural piety toward one's origins can live side by side with a spirit of critical detachment.... The story of the immigrant Jews is all but done. Like all stories of human striving, it ought to be complete, with its beginning and its end, at rest in fulfillment and at ease with failure.... Here, in these pages, is the story of the Jews, bedraggled and inspired, who came from eastern Europe. Let us now praise obscure men.

== Critical reception ==
When World of Our Fathers was published in early 1976, it garnered rave reviews. In The New York Times Book Review, Theodore Solotaroff called it "a great book":

Those who are not Jewish can still read a marvelous narrative about two generations of "bedraggled and inspired" Jewish immigrants on the Lower East Side and beyond in virtually all of their social and cultural hearings and in most of their political and economic ones. A work of history and of art, World of Our Fathers is brilliantly organized and paced by brisk, pithy chapters that make up large perspectives—the detonations of new hopes and renewed fear that drove the immigrants out of the Russian Pale after the assassination of Alexander II and the pogroms that followed; the wretchedness and culture shock of the first two decades in New York; the daily family and work life in the filthy, noisy, flaring streets off East Broadway; the dynamics of the Jewish labor movement and of the culture of Yiddishkeit and the rapid, fated dispersion into America.

In The New Republic, Nathan Glazer labeled the book "a triumph". In The New Leader, Pearl Kazin Bell described it as "history and celebration, memory and judgment" and for second-generation Jewish immigrants, "an act of redemption". Leon Wieseltier wrote in his review:

World of Our Fathers, let it be said at once, is a masterly social and cultural history, a vivid, elegiac, and scrupulously documented portrait of a complicated culture, from its heroic beginnings to its unheroic end. Fully conversant with the literature on America's Jews, Howe has generously supplemented it with the little-known writings of journalists and memoirists, and studded his narrative with those evocative petits faits significatifs without which social history would be only a slightly less dreary branch of sociology. Never once does he lose sight of his hero, dos kleyne menshele, the little man.

The most common criticism of the book was that Howe slanted his account of the Lower East Side based on his ideological preferences, i.e., he gave undue importance to Jewish unionism and socialism because of his passion for leftist politics, and as a secularist he underestimated the role of religion in holding together the Jewish immigrant community. In a Commentary essay, Midge Decter expressed this negative view of the book:

Reading it, one would suppose that the entire population of East European Jewish immigrants went through a passage during which, in response to the combined awesomeness, hardship, and liberty of the New World, they were radical or at least vaguely and sentimentally socialist. For the legendary world of Mr. Howe's fathers included virtually no synagogues, no yeshivahs, no rabbis, a few Democratic ward-heelers but certainly no Republicans, and above all, no representatives of that strange and to Mr. Howe hostile breed known as Zionists: only workers dreaming of the advancement of their children through education, street-corner idlers and agitators, theatergoers, journalists, café intellectuals, political and union leaders, and, as I have said, leftists of one variety or another and nascent New Dealers.

== Legacy ==
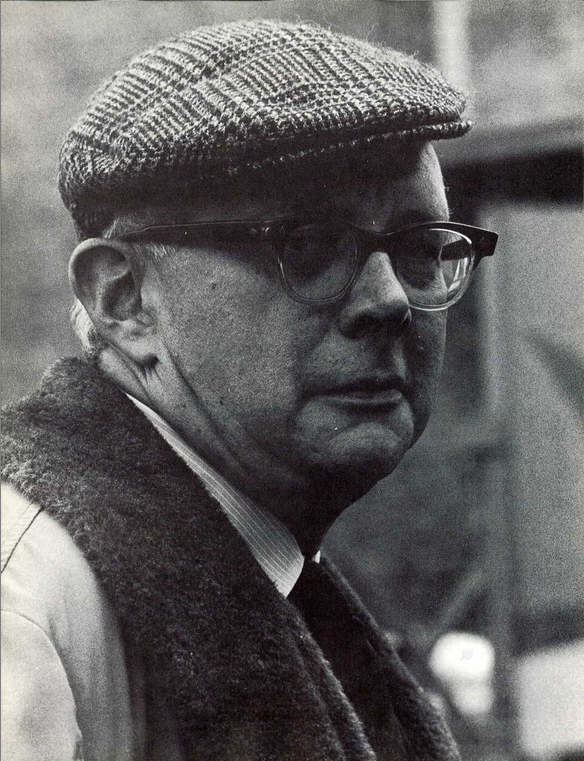
Photograph of Howe taken during the 1967-68 academic year at the University of Michigan.

Decades later, World of Our Fathers elicited reassessments that sought to explain its enduring cultural significance as well as the unlikely fact that a 700-page tome by a socialist intellectual would become a #1 bestseller. Many suggested that Irving Howe had tapped into a deep vein of nostalgia felt by second- and third-generation Jews for the early days of their parents and grandparents. In a re-appreciation written in 1997, Morris Dickstein labeled the book "an elegy for a lost world" which resonated with assimilated Jewish-American readers:

In World of Our Fathers they were able to reconnect to a world of struggle and idealism they had long repressed. The book, finding its way into virtually every Jewish home, provided them with an emotional catharsis.

Some critics noted that World of Our Fathers appeared at a propitious moment when Americans of varying racial and ethnic backgrounds were seeking to rediscover their heritage. The concurrent success in 1976 of Howe's book along with Alex Haley's Roots and Maxine Hong Kingston's The Woman Warrior signified an "ethnic revival" trend and the beginning of what would later be known as multiculturalism. Howe was even dubbed "the Jewish Alex Haley".

In a 1997 Centennial Review essay, Kenneth Waltzer reflected on what had changed in Jewish-American life since Howe wrote his book:

American Jews have dispersed further from urban to suburban areas and from a few metropolitan areas to settlements across the country, and they are several generations removed from urban slums and working-class struggles. They involve themselves with new touchstones of memory and identity—for many the Holocaust or Israel, for some renewed religious observation or communal renewal.... Since publication of World of Our Fathers, American Jews have come to think of themselves as a post-Holocaust Jewry as much or more than a post-immigration Jewry.

In December 2000, the American Jewish History journal devoted an entire issue to World of Our Fathers. In one of the essays, Gerald Sorin wrote:

Perhaps readers of World, now some distance from the Ghetto, were able to reconnect to a time of struggle and idealism they had long put behind them, but the success of the book indicated to Howe a readiness on the part of Jewish-Americans "to say farewell in a last fond gesture—an affectionate backward glance at the world of their fathers before turning their backs forever and moving on, as they had to."

== See also ==
- Jewish assimilation
- Lower East Side
