= Anglo-Saxon Chronicle =

Set of related medieval English chronicles

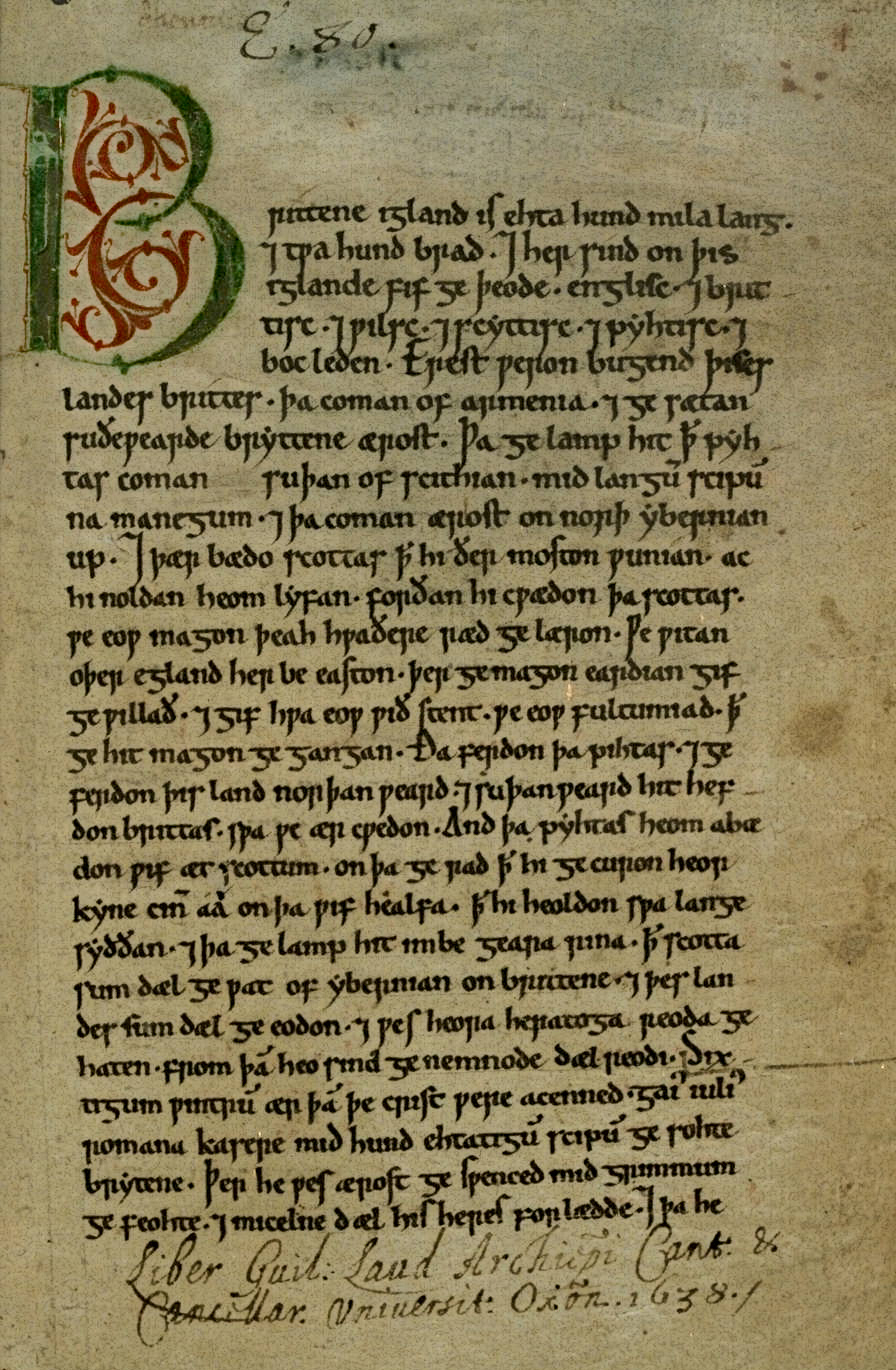
The initial page of the Peterborough Chronicle ASC E.

The Anglo-Saxon Chronicle (also ASC and the Chronicle) is the term used by historians to describe a set of annals in Old English, chronicling the history of the Anglo-Saxons.

The lost first version of the Chronicle was created in the late ninth century, probably in Wessex, during the reign of King Alfred the Great (r. 871–899). Its content, which incorporated sources now otherwise lost dating from as early as the seventh century, is known as the "Common Stock" of the Chronicle. Multiple copies were made of that one original and then distributed to monasteries across England, where they were updated, partly independently. These manuscripts collectively are known as the Anglo-Saxon Chronicle. Almost all of the material in the Chronicle is in the form of annals, by year. The earliest is dated at 60 BC, the annals' date for Julius Caesar's invasions of Britain. In one case, the Chronicle was still being actively updated in 1154.

Nine manuscripts of the Chronicle, none of which is the original, survive in whole or in part. Seven are held in the British Library, one in the Bodleian Library at Oxford, and the oldest in the Parker Library of Corpus Christi College, Cambridge. The oldest seems to have been started towards the end of Alfred's reign, while the most recent was copied at Peterborough Abbey after a fire at that monastery in 1116. Some later medieval chronicles deriving from lost manuscripts contribute occasional further hints concerning Chronicle material.

Both because much of the information given in the Chronicle is not recorded elsewhere, and because of the relatively clear chronological framework it provides for understanding events, the Chronicle is among the most influential historical sources for England between the collapse of Roman authority and the decades following the Norman Conquest; Nicholas Howe called it and Bede's Ecclesiastical History of the English People "the two great Anglo-Saxon works of history". The Chronicle's accounts tend to be highly politicised, with the Common Stock intended primarily to legitimise the House of Wessex and the reign of Alfred the Great. Comparison between Chronicle manuscripts and with other medieval sources demonstrates that the scribes who copied or added to them omitted events or told one-sided versions of them, often providing useful insights into early medieval English politics.

The Chronicle manuscripts are also important sources for the history of the English language; in particular, in annals from 1131 onwards, the later Peterborough text provides key evidence for the transition from the standard Old English literary language to early Middle English, containing some of the earliest known Middle English text.

== Sources and composition of the Common Stock ==
=== Place and date of composition ===
The Common Stock of the Chronicle dates to around 893, as it covers the Vikings' return from the Continent in that year, and a version was available to Bishop Asser for his 893 Life of King Alfred. There is debate about precisely which year, and when subsequent continuations began to be added.

It is not known for certain where the Common Stock was compiled, not least because the archetype is lost, but it is agreed to have been in Wessex. It was probably produced in the scholarly circle around King Alfred. He may not have been personally involved, and Simon Keynes and Michael Lapidge comment that we should "resist the temptation to regard it as a form of West Saxon dynastic propaganda". Yet there is no doubt that the Common Stock systematically promotes Alfred's dynasty and rule, and was consistent with his enthusiasm for learning and the use of English as a written language. It seems partly to have been inspired by the Royal Frankish Annals, and its wide distribution is also consistent with Alfredian policies. Its publication was perhaps prompted by renewed Scandinavian attacks on Wessex.

=== Sources and reliability ===
The Common Stock incorporates material from multiple sources, including annals relating to Kentish, South Saxon, Mercian and, particularly, West Saxon history. It is unclear how far this material was first drawn together by the editor(s) of the Common Stock and how far it had already been combined before the late ninth century: there are no obvious shifts in language features in the Common Stock that could help indicate different sources. Where the Common Stock draws on other known sources its main value to modern historians is as an index of the works and themes that were important to its compilers; where it offers unique material it is of especial historical interest.

==== The "world history annals" ====
From the first annal, for 60BC, down to 449, the Common Stock mostly presents key events from beyond Britain, a body of material known as the "world history annals". These drew on Jerome's De Viris Illustribus, the Liber Pontificalis, the translation of Eusebius's Ecclesiastical History by Rufinus, and Isidore of Seville's Chronicon. Alongside these, down to the early eighth century, the Common Stock makes extensive use of the chronological summary from the end of Bede's Ecclesiastical History (and perhaps occasionally the History itself). Scholars have read these annals as functioning to present England as part of the Roman and Christian world and its history.

==== Fifth and sixth centuries ====
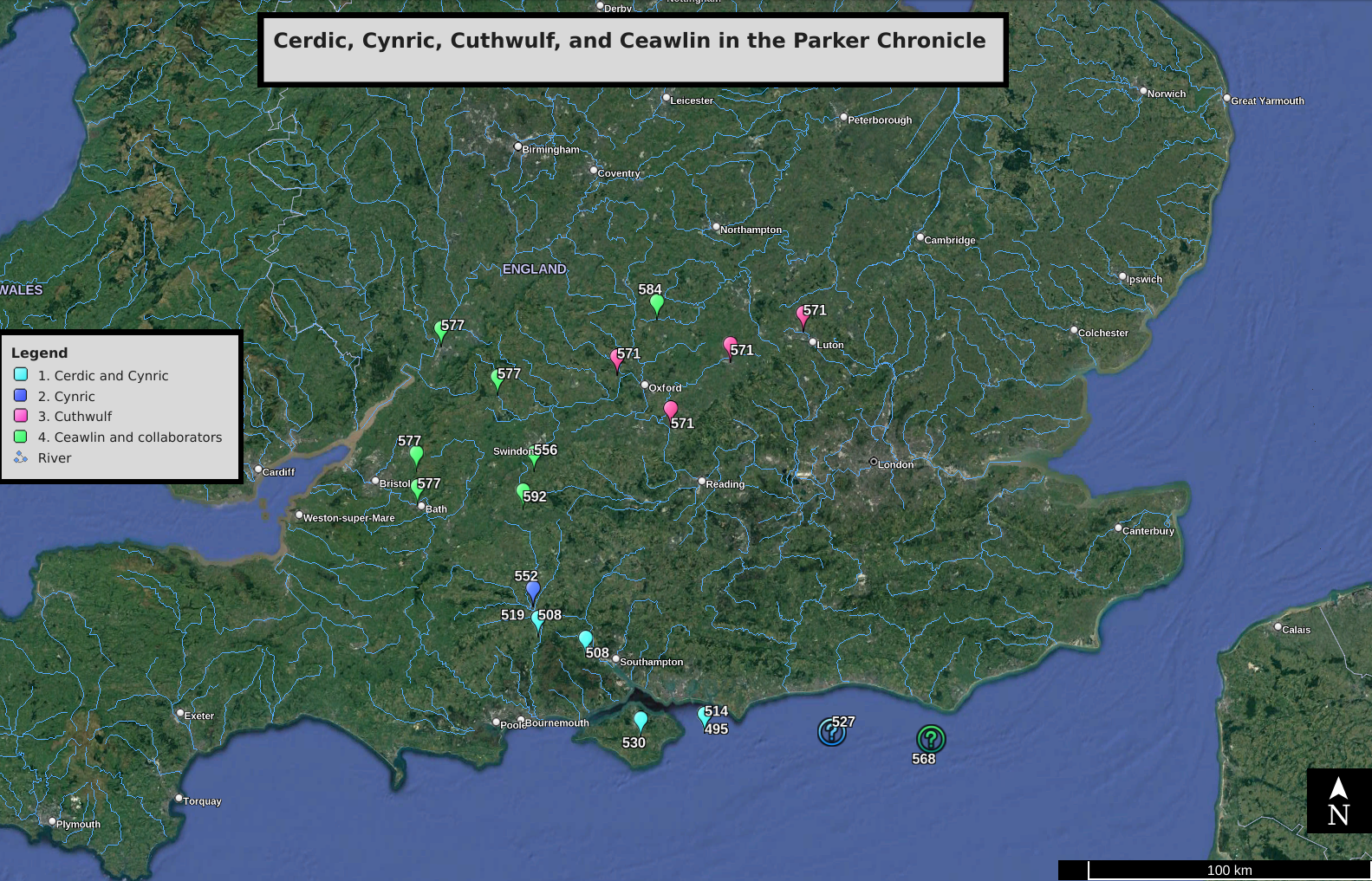
Sixth- and seventh-century battles of West-Saxon kings according to the Anglo-Saxon Chronicle

From 449, coverage of non-British history largely vanishes and extensive material about the parts of England which by the ninth century were in Wessex, often unique to the Chronicle, appears. The Chronicle offers an ostensibly coherent account of the Anglo-Saxon settlement of southern Britain by seafarers who, through a series of battles, establish the kingdoms of Kent, Sussex, and Wessex. This material was once supposed by many historians to be reliable evidence, and formed the backbone of a canonical narrative of early English history; but its unreliability was exposed in the 1980s. The historian Ken Dark argues that a ninth-century text is only reliable for the fifth and sixth century if it is based on written sources dating to the period, and as there is no reason to believe that any substantial texts were written at that time, there is no reason to trust entries in the Anglo-Saxon Chronicle for this period.

The earliest non-Bedan material here seems to be based primarily on royal genealogies and lists of bishops that were perhaps first being put into writing around 600, as English kings converted to Christianity, and more certainly by the end of the reign of Ine of Wessex (r. 689–726). Such sources are best represented by the Anglian King-list and the probably derived West Saxon Genealogical Regnal List. Detailed comparison of these sources with the Common Stock has helped to show the degree of invention in the Common Stock's vision of the fifth and sixth centuries. For example, perhaps due to edits in intermediary annals, the beginning of the reign of Cerdic, supposedly the founder of the West-Saxon dynasty, seems to have been pushed back from 538AD in the earliest reconstructable version of the List to 500AD in the Common Stock.

At times, invention, usually through folk-etymological origin-myths based on place-names, is even more obvious. For example, between 514 and 544 the Chronicle makes reference to Wihtgar, who was supposedly buried on the Isle of Wight at Wihtgaræsbyrg ("Wihtgar's stronghold") and gave his name to the island. However, the name of the Isle of Wight derives from the Latin Vectis, not from Wihtgar. The actual name of the fortress was probably Wihtwarabyrg ("the stronghold of the inhabitants of Wight"), and either the Common Stock editor(s) or an earlier source misinterpreted this as referring to Wihtgar.

==== Seventh and eighth centuries ====
In addition to the sources listed above, it is thought that the Common Stock draws on contemporary annals that began to be kept in Wessex during the seventh century, perhaps as annotations of Easter Tables, drawn up to help clergy determine the dates of upcoming Christian feasts, which might be annotated with short notes of memorable events to distinguish one year from another. The annal for 648 may mark the point after which entries that were written as a contemporary record begin to appear, and the annal for 661 records a battle fought by Cenwalh that is said to have been fought "at Easter", a precision which implies a contemporary record. Similar but separate sources would explain the dates and genealogies for Northumbrian and Mercian kings.

The entry for 755, describing how Cynewulf took the kingship of Wessex from Sigeberht, is far longer than the surrounding entries, and includes direct speech quotations from the participants in those events. It seems likely that this was taken by the scribe from existing saga material.

==== Ninth century ====
From the late eighth century onwards, a period coinciding in the text with the beginning of Scandinavian raids on England, the Chronicle gathered momentum. As the Chronicle proceeded, it lost its list-like appearance, and annals became longer and more narrative in content. Many later entries contain a great deal of historical narrative in each annal.

== Development after the Common Stock ==
Nine manuscripts of the Anglo-Chronicle survive, conventionally called [A] to [I]. They are copies and continuations of the Common Stock, covering different subsequent periods and reflecting the differing locations and agendas of the compilers. They also incorporate further lost manuscripts, such as the 'Mercian Register' covering the early tenth century, which differs from versions which adopt a West Saxon viewpoint and ignore Mercian achievements.

The manuscripts' alternative perspectives colour both the description of interactions between Wessex and other kingdoms, and the descriptions of the Vikings' depredations. For example, the Chronicle's annal for 829 describes Egbert's invasion of Northumbria with the comment that the Northumbrians offered him "submission and peace". The Northumbrian chronicles incorporated into Roger of Wendover's thirteenth-century history give a different picture, however: "When Egbert had obtained all the southern kingdoms, he led a large army into Northumbria, and laid waste that province with severe pillaging, and made King Eanred pay tribute."

Similar divergences are apparent in different manuscripts of the Chronicle. For example, Ælfgar, earl of East Anglia, and son of Leofric, the earl of Mercia, was exiled briefly in 1055. The [C], [D] and [E] manuscripts say the following:

- [C]: "Earl Ælfgar, son of Earl Leofric, was outlawed without any fault ..."
- [D]: "Earl Ælfgar, son of Earl Leofric, was outlawed well-nigh without fault ..."
- [E]: "Earl Ælfgar was outlawed because it was thrown at him that he was traitor to the king and all the people of the land. And he admitted this before all the men who were gathered there, although the words shot out against his will."

The 1055 campaign involving Ælfgar and Welsh King Gruffudd ap Llywelyn, as recorded in manuscripts [C], [D], and [E], offers examples of how scribes shaped narratives to align with regional or political agendas. Besides [C] emphasizing Ælfgar's innocence, his collaboration with Gruffudd, who is portrayed as a key ally and titled as a Welsh king, is also extensively mentioned. Conversely, [E] omits Gruffudd's title and focuses on Ælfgar's alleged treachery, framing both figures as aggressors in the Hereford campaign.

Cardiff University historian Rebecca Thomas states this ideological framing aligns with [E]'s broader "pro-Godwine" perspective (referring to the Anglo-Saxon Godwine family dynasty to whom King Harold II belonged). Meanwhile, [D] minimizes details of Gruffudd's involvement in the campaign, offering a more subdued account that excludes his royal title and reduces his role to a supporting figure.

Scribes might also omit material, sometimes accidentally, but also for ideological reasons. Ælfgar was Earl of Mercia by 1058, and in that year was exiled again. This time only [D] has anything to say: "Here Earl Ælfgar was expelled, but he soon came back again, with violence, through the help of Gruffydd. And here came a raiding ship-army from Norway; it is tedious to tell how it all happened." In this case other sources exist to clarify the picture: a major Norwegian attempt was made on England, but [E] says nothing at all, and [D] scarcely mentions it. It has sometimes been argued that when the Chronicle is silent, other sources that report major events must be mistaken, but this example demonstrates that the Chronicle does omit important events.

Manuscripts [C], [D] and [E] for 983 to 1022 are based on a lost version, sometimes called the 'Æthelredian Chronicle', probably written in London in 1022 or 1023. The chronicler's viewpoint reflects the disaster of the Danish conquest of England by Cnut, and it disparages Æthelred the Unready and his advisers and praises his son Edmund Ironside.

== Errors in dating ==
The process of manual copying introduced accidental errors in dates; such errors were sometimes compounded in the chain of transmission. The whole of the Common Stock has a chronological dislocation of two years for the period 756–845 due to two years being missed out in the archetype. In the [D] manuscript, the scribe omits the year 1044 from the list on the left-hand side. The annals copied down are therefore incorrect from 1045 to 1052, which has two entries.

A more difficult problem is the question of the date at which a new year began, since the modern custom of starting the year on 1 January was not universal at that time. The entry for 1091 in [E] begins at Christmas and continues throughout the year; it is clear that this entry follows the old custom of starting the year at Christmas. Some other entries appear to begin the year on 25 March, such as the year 1044 in the [C] manuscript, which ends with Edward the Confessor's marriage on 23 January, while the entry for 22 April is recorded under 1045. There are also years which appear to start in September.

== Surviving manuscripts ==
A map showing the places where the various chronicles were written, and where they are now kept

Of the nine surviving manuscripts, seven are written entirely in Old English (also known as Anglo-Saxon). One, known as the Bilingual Canterbury Epitome, is in Old English with a translation of each annal into Latin. Another, the Peterborough Chronicle, is in Old English except for the last entry, which is in early Middle English. The oldest (Corp. Chris. MS 173) is known as the Winchester Chronicle or the Parker Chronicle (after Matthew Parker, an Archbishop of Canterbury, who once owned it), and is written in Old English until 1070, then Latin to 1075. Six of the manuscripts were printed in an 1861 edition for the Rolls Series by Benjamin Thorpe with the text laid out in columns labelled A to F. He also included the few readable remnants of a burned seventh manuscript, which he referred to as [G], partially destroyed in a fire at Ashburnham House in London in 1731, and only a few leaves remain. Following this convention, the two additional manuscripts are often called [H] and [I].

Siglum	Chronicle name	Library	Shelfmark	Source
A	Winchester (or Parker) Chronicle	Parker Library, Corpus Christi College	173	
B	Abingdon Chronicle I	British Library	Cotton Tiberius A. vi, fos 1-35 & iii, fo 178	
C	Abingdon Chronicle II	British Library	Cotton Tiberius B. i	
D	Worcester Chronicle	British Library	Cotton Tiberius B. iv	
E	Peterborough (or Laud) Chronicle	Bodleian Library	Laud misc. 636	
F	The Domitian Bilingual	British Library	Cotton Domitian A. viii	
G or A^{2} or W	A copy of the Winchester Chronicle	British Library	Cotton Otho B. xi + Otho B. x	
H	Cottonian Fragment	British Library	Cotton Domitian A. ix	
I	An Easter Table Chronicle	British Library	Cotton Caligula A. xv	

== Relationships between the manuscripts ==
The relationships between seven of the different manuscripts of the Chronicle. The fragment [H] cannot be reliably positioned in the chart. Other related texts are also shown. The diagram shows a putative original, and also gives the relationships of the manuscripts to a version produced in the north of England that did not survive but which is thought to have existed.

The manuscripts are all thought to derive from a common original, but the connections between the texts are more complex than simple inheritance via copying. The diagram at right gives an overview of the relationships between the manuscripts. The following is a summary of the relationships that are known.

- [A^{2}] was a copy of [A], made in Winchester, probably between 1001 and 1013.
- [B] was used in the compilation of [C] at Abingdon, in the mid-11th century. However, the scribe for [C] also had access to another version, which has not survived.
- [D] includes material from Bede's Ecclesiastical History written by 731 and from a set of 8th-century Northumbrian annals and is thought to have been copied from a northern version that has not survived.
- [E] has material that appears to derive from the same sources as [D] but does not include some additions that appear only in [D], such as the Mercian Register. This manuscript was composed at the monastery in Peterborough, some time after a fire there in 1116 that probably destroyed their copy of the Chronicle; [E] appears to have been created thereafter as a copy of a Kentish version, probably from Canterbury.
- [F] appears to include material from the same Canterbury version that was used to create [E].
- Asser's Life of King Alfred, which was written in 893, includes a translation of the Chronicle's entries from 849 to 887. Only [A], of surviving manuscripts, could have been in existence by 893, but there are places where Asser departs from the text in [A], so it is possible that Asser used a version that has not survived. (Note: For example, Asser omits Esla from Alfred's genealogy; [A] includes Esla but [D] does not.)
- Æthelweard wrote a translation of the Chronicle, known as the Chronicon Æthelweardi, into Latin in the late 10th century; the version he used probably came from the same branch in the tree of relationships that [A] comes from.
- Asser's text agrees with [A] and with Æthelweard's text in some places against the combined testimony of [B], [C], [D] and [E], implying that there is a common ancestor for the latter four manuscripts.
- At Bury St Edmunds, some time between 1120 and 1140, an unknown author wrote a Latin chronicle known as the Annals of St Neots. This work includes material from a copy of the Chronicle, but it is very difficult to tell which version because the annalist was selective about his use of the material. It may have been a northern recension, or a Latin derivative of that recension.

All the manuscripts described above share a chronological error between the years 756 and 845, but it is apparent that the composer of the Annals of St Neots was using a copy that did not have this error and which must have preceded them. Æthelweard's copy did have the chronological error but it had not lost a whole sentence from annal 885; all the surviving manuscripts have lost this sentence. Hence the error and the missing sentence must have been introduced in separate copying steps, implying that none of the surviving manuscripts are closer than two removes from the original version.

== History of the manuscripts ==
=== A: Winchester Chronicle ===
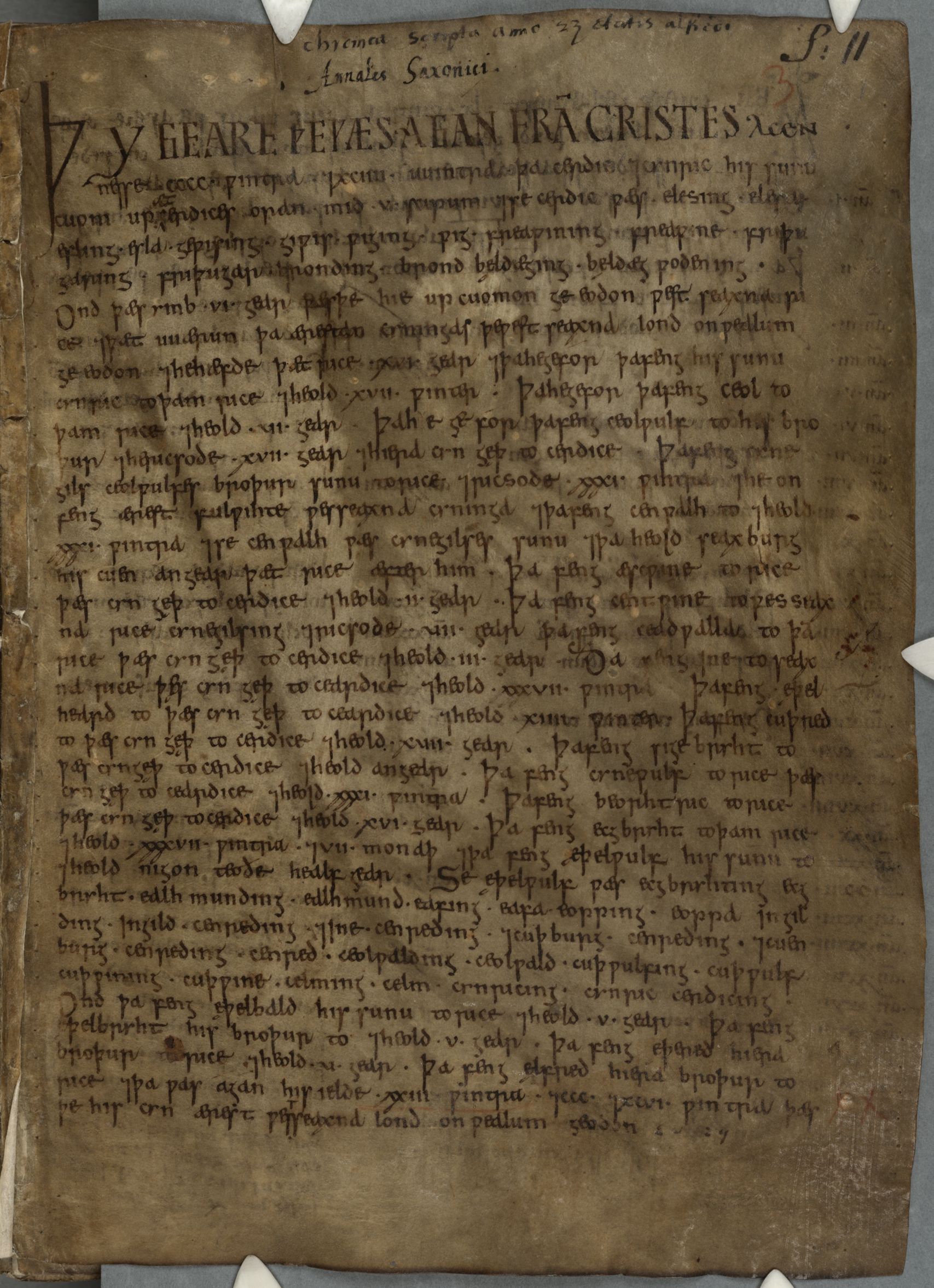
A page from the Winchester, or Parker, Chronicle, showing the genealogical preface

The Winchester (or Parker) Chronicle is the oldest manuscript of the Chronicle that survives. It was begun at Old Minster, Winchester, towards the end of Alfred's reign. The manuscript begins with a genealogy of Alfred, and the first chronicle entry is for the year 60 BC. The section containing the Chronicle takes up folios 1–32. Unlike the other manuscripts, [A] is of early enough composition to show entries dating back to the late 9th century in the hands of different scribes as the entries were made. The first scribe's hand is dateable to the late 9th or very early 10th century; his entries cease in late 891, and the following entries were made at intervals throughout the 10th century by several scribes. The eighth scribe wrote the annals for the years 925–955, and was clearly at Winchester when he wrote them since he adds some material related to events there; he also uses ceaster, or "city", to mean Winchester. The manuscript becomes independent of the other recensions after the entry for 975. The book, which also had a copy of the Laws of Alfred and Ine bound in after the entry for 924, was transferred to Canterbury some time in the early 11th century, as evidenced by a list of books that Archbishop Parker gave to Corpus Christi.

While at Canterbury, some interpolations were made; this required some erasures in the manuscript. The additional entries appear to have been taken from a version of the manuscript from which [E] descends. The last entry in the vernacular is for 1070. After this comes the Latin Acta Lanfranci, which covers church events from 1070 to 1093. This is followed by a list of popes and the Archbishops of Canterbury to whom they sent the pallium. The manuscript was acquired by Matthew Parker, Archbishop of Canterbury (1559–1575) and is in the collection of the Parker Library, Corpus Christi College.

=== B: Abingdon Chronicle I ===
The Abingdon Chronicle I was written by a single scribe in the second half of the 10th century. The Chronicle takes up folios 1–34. It begins with an entry for 60 BC and ends with the entry for 977. A manuscript that is now separate (British Library MS. Cotton Tiberius Aiii, f. 178) was originally the introduction to this chronicle; it contains a genealogy, as does [A], but extends it to the late 10th century. [B] was at Abingdon in the mid-11th century, because it was used in the composition of [C]. Shortly after this it went to Canterbury, where interpolations and corrections were made. As with [A], it ends with a list of popes and the archbishops of Canterbury to whom they sent the pallium.

=== C: Abingdon Chronicle II ===
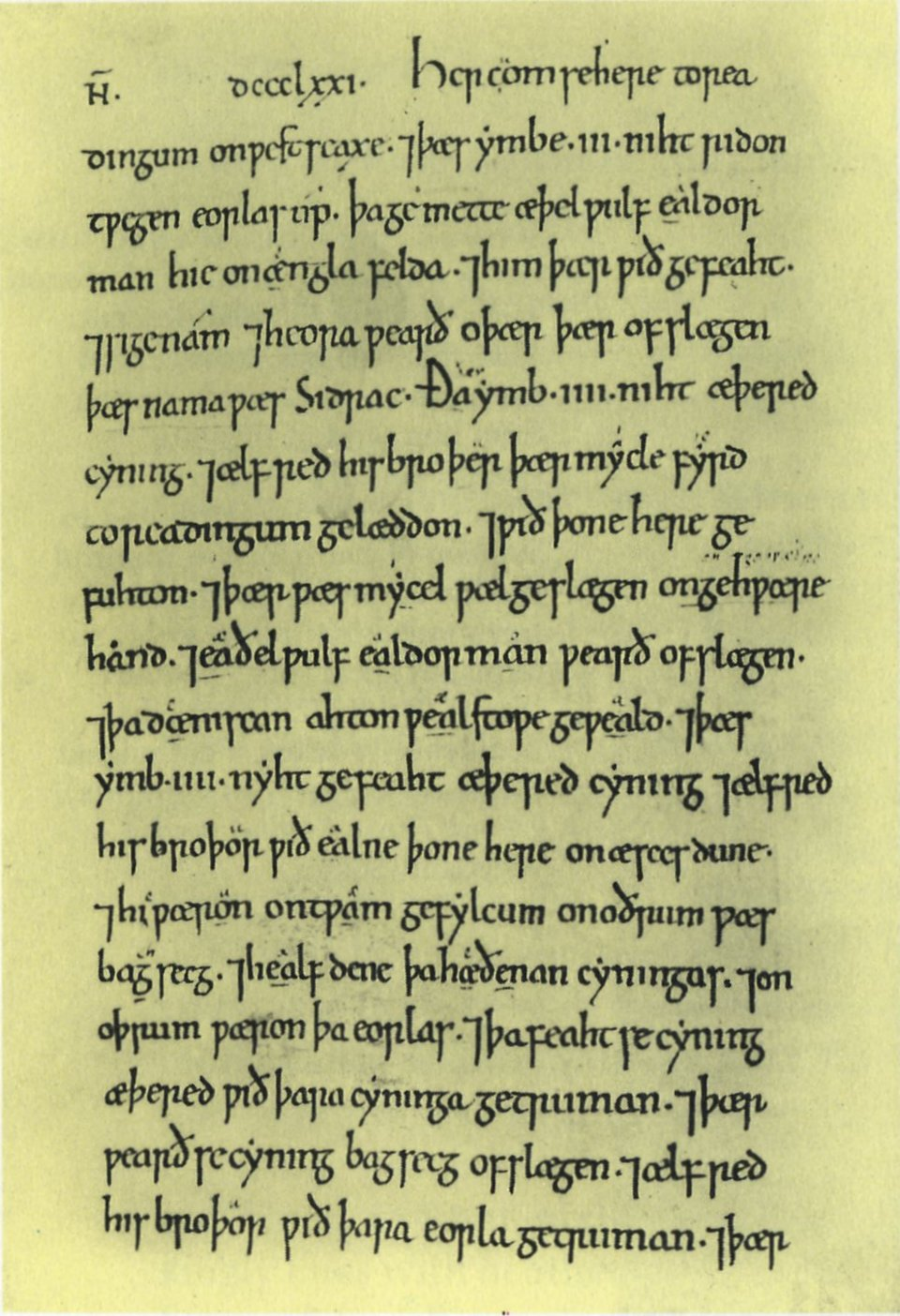
A page from the [C] Abingdon II text of the Anglo-Saxon Chronicle. This entry is for 871, a year of battles between Wessex and the Vikings.

C includes additional material from local annals at Abingdon, where it was composed. The section containing the Chronicle (folios 115–64) is preceded by King Alfred's Old English translation of Orosius's world history, followed by a menologium and some gnomic verses of the laws of the natural world and of humanity. Then follows a copy of the chronicle, beginning with 60 BC; the first scribe copied up to the entry for 490, and a second scribe took over up to the entry for 1048.

[B] and [C] are identical between 491 and 652, but differences thereafter make it clear that the second scribe was also using another copy of the Chronicle. This scribe also inserted, after the annal for 915, the Mercian Register, which covers the years 902–924, and which focuses on Æthelflæd. The manuscript continues to 1066 and stops in the middle of the description of the Battle of Stamford Bridge. In the 12th century a few lines were added to complete the account.

=== D: Worcester Chronicle ===
The Worcester Chronicle appears to have been written in the middle of the 11th century. After 1033 it includes some records from Worcester, so it is generally thought to have been composed there. Five different scribes can be identified for the entries up to 1054, after which it appears to have been worked on at intervals. The text includes material from Bede's Ecclesiastical History and from a set of 8th-century Northumbrian annals. It is thought that some of the entries may have been composed by Archbishop Wulfstan.

[D] contains more information than other manuscripts on northern and Scottish affairs, and it has been speculated that it was a copy intended for the Anglicised Scottish court. From 972 to 1016, the sees of York and Worcester were both held by the same person—Oswald from 972, Ealdwulf from 992, and Wulfstan from 1003, and this may explain why a northern recension was to be found at Worcester. By the 16th century, parts of the manuscript were lost; eighteen pages were inserted containing substitute entries from other sources, including [A], [B], [C] and [E]. These pages were written by John Joscelyn, who was secretary to Matthew Parker.

=== E: Peterborough Chronicle ===
The Peterborough Chronicle: In 1116, a fire at the monastery at Peterborough destroyed most of the buildings. The copy of the Chronicle kept there may have been lost at that time or later, but in either case shortly thereafter a fresh copy was made, apparently copied from a Kentish version—most likely to have been from Canterbury. The manuscript was written at one time and by a single scribe, down to the annal for 1121. The scribe added material relating to Peterborough Abbey which is not in other versions.

The Canterbury original which he copied was similar, but not identical, to [D]: the Mercian Register does not appear, and a poem about the Battle of Brunanburh in 937, which appears in most of the other surviving copies of the Chronicle, is not recorded. The same scribe then continued the annals through to 1131; these entries were made at intervals, and thus are presumably contemporary records.

A second scribe, in 1154, wrote an account of the years 1132–1154, though his dating is known to be unreliable. This last entry is in Middle English, rather than Old English. [E] was once owned by William Laud, Archbishop of Canterbury 1633–1645, so is also known as the Laud Chronicle. The manuscript contains occasional glosses in Latin, and is referred to (as "the Saxon storye of Peterborowe church") in an antiquarian book from 1566. According to Joscelyn, Nowell had a transcript of the manuscript. Previous owners include William Camden and William L'Isle; the latter probably passed the manuscript on to Laud.

=== F: Canterbury Bilingual Epitome ===
The Canterbury Bilingual Epitome (London, British Library, Cotton Domitian A.viii, folios 30-70): In about 1100, a copy of the Chronicle was written at Christ Church, Canterbury, probably by one of the scribes who made notes in [A]. This version is written in both Old English and Latin; each entry in Old English was followed by the Latin version. The version the scribe copied (on folios 30–70) is similar to the version used by the scribe in Peterborough who wrote [E], though it seems to have been abridged. It includes the same introductory material as [D] and, along with [E], is one of the two chronicles that does not include the "Battle of Brunanburh" poem. The manuscript has many annotations and interlineations, some made by the original scribe and some by later scribes, including Robert Talbot.

=== A^{2}/G: Copy of the Winchester Chronicle ===
Copy of the Winchester Chronicle: [A^{2}] was copied from [A] at Winchester in the eleventh century and follows a 10th-century copy of an Old English translation of Bede's Ecclesiastical History. The last annal copied was 1001, so the copy was made no earlier than that; an episcopal list appended to [A^{2}] suggests that the copy was made by 1013. This manuscript was almost completely destroyed in the 1731 fire at Ashburnham House in Westminster, where the Cotton Library was housed. Of the original 34 leaves, seven remain, ff. 39–47 in the manuscript.

A transcript had been made by Laurence Nowell, a 16th-century antiquary, which was used by Abraham Wheelocke in an edition of the Chronicle printed in 1643. Because of this, it is also sometimes known as [W], after Wheelocke. Nowell's transcript copied the genealogical introduction detached from [B] (the page now British Library MS. Cotton Tiberius Aiii, f. 178), rather than that originally part of this document. The original [A^{2}] introduction was later removed prior to the fire and survives as British Library Add MS 34652, f. 2. The appellations [A], [A^{2}] and [G] derive from Plummer, Smith and Thorpe, respectively.

=== H: Cottonian Fragment ===
The Cottonian Fragment [H] consists of a single leaf, containing annals for 1113 and 1114. In the entry for 1113 it includes the phrase "he came to Winchester"; hence it is thought likely that the manuscript was written at Winchester. There is not enough of this manuscript for reliable relationships to other manuscripts to be established. Ker notes that the entries may have been written contemporarily.

=== I: Easter Table Chronicle ===
Easter Table Chronicle: A list of Chronicle entries accompanies a table of years, found on folios 133–37 in a badly burned manuscript containing miscellaneous notes on charms, the calculation of dates for church services, and annals pertaining to Christ Church, Canterbury. Most of the Chronicle's entries pertain to Christ Church, Canterbury. Until 1109, the death of Anselm of Canterbury, they are in English. All but one of the following entries are in Latin.

Part of [I] was written by a scribe soon after 1073, in the same hand and ink as the rest of the Caligula MS. After 1085, the annals are in various contemporary hands. The original annalist's entry for the Norman conquest is limited to "Her forðferde eadward kyng"; a later hand added the coming of William the Conqueror, "7 her com willelm."

=== Lost manuscripts ===
Two manuscripts are recorded in an old catalogue of the library of Durham; they are described as cronica duo Anglica. In addition, Parker included a manuscript called Hist. Angliae Saxonica in his gifts but the manuscript that included this, now Cambridge University Library MS. Hh.1.10, has lost 52 of its leaves, including all of this copy of the chronicle.

== Use by Latin and Anglo-Norman historians ==
The three main Anglo-Norman historians, John of Worcester, William of Malmesbury and Henry of Huntingdon, each had a copy of the Chronicle, which they adapted for their own purposes. Symeon of Durham also had a copy of the Chronicle. Some later medieval historians also used the Chronicle, and others took their material from those who had used it, and so the Chronicle became "central to the mainstream of English historical tradition".

Henry of Huntingdon used a copy of the Chronicle that was very similar to [E]. There is no evidence in his work of any of the entries in [E] after 1121, so although his manuscript may actually have been [E], it may also have been a copy—either one taken of [E] prior to the entries he makes no use of, or a manuscript from which [E] was copied, with the copying taking place prior to the date of the last annal he uses. Henry also made use of the [C] manuscript.

The Waverley Annals made use of a manuscript that was similar to [E], though it appears that it did not contain the entries focused on Peterborough. The manuscript of the chronicle translated by Geoffrey Gaimar cannot be identified accurately, though according to historian Dorothy Whitelock it was "a rather better text than 'E' or 'F'". Gaimar implies that there was a copy at Winchester in his day (the middle of the 12th century); Whitelock suggests that there is evidence that a manuscript that has not survived to the present day was at Winchester in the mid-tenth century. If it survived to Gaimar's time that would explain why [A] was not kept up to date, and why [A] could be given to the monastery at Canterbury.

John of Worcester's Chronicon ex chronicis appears to have had a manuscript that was either [A] or similar to it; he makes use of annals that do not appear in other versions, such as entries concerning Edward the Elder's campaigns and information about Winchester towards the end of the chronicle. His account is often similar to that of [D], though there is less attention paid to Margaret of Scotland, an identifying characteristic of [D]. He had the Mercian register, which appears only in [C] and [D]; and he includes material from annals 979–982 which only appears in [C]. It is possible he had a manuscript that was an ancestor of [D]. He also had sources which have not been identified, and some of his statements have no earlier surviving source.

A manuscript similar to [E] was available to William of Malmesbury, though it is unlikely to have been [E] as that manuscript is known to have still been in Peterborough after the time William was working, and he does not make use of any of the entries in [E] that are specifically related to Peterborough. It is likely he had either the original from which [E] was copied, or a copy of that original. He mentions that the chronicles do not give any information on the murder of Alfred Aetheling, but since this is covered in both [C] and [D] it is apparent he had no access to those manuscripts. On occasion he appears to show some knowledge of [D], but it is possible that his information was taken from John of Worcester's account. He also omits any reference to a battle fought by Cenwealh in 652; this battle is mentioned in [A], [B] and [C], but not in [E]. He does mention a battle fought by Cenwealh at Wirtgernesburg, which is not in any of the extant manuscripts, so it is possible he had a copy now lost.

== Editions and translations ==
=== Early history ===
One early edition of the Chronicle was Abraham Wheelocke's 1644 Venerabilis Bedae Historia Ecclesiastica, printed in Cambridge and based on manuscript G. An important edition appeared in 1692, by Edmund Gibson, an English jurist and divine who later (1716) became Bishop of Lincoln. Titled Chronicon Saxonicum, it printed the Old English text in parallel columns with Gibson's own Latin version and became the standard edition until the 19th century. Gibson used three manuscripts of which the chief was the Peterborough Chronicle. It was superseded in 1861 by Benjamin Thorpe's Rolls Series edition, which printed six versions in columns, labelled A to F, thus giving the manuscripts the letters which are now used to refer to them.

John Earle edited Two of the Saxon Chronicles Parallel in 1865. Charles Plummer revised this edition, providing notes, appendices, and glossary in two volumes in 1892 and 1899. This edition of the A and E texts, with material from other versions, was widely used; it was reprinted in 1952.

=== Modern translations ===
The standard modern English translations are by Dorothy Whitelock, David Douglas and Susie Tucker, and by Michael Swanton.

H. A. Rositzke published a translation of the [E] text in The Peterborough Chronicle (New York, 1951).

An edition and facing-page modern English translation of the [A] text appears in Janet Bately, Joseph C. Harris, and Katherine O'Brien O'Keeffe, with Susan Irvine, The Old English Chronicle, Volume I: The A-Text to 1001 and Related Poems, Dumbarton Oaks Medieval Library 91 (Cambridge, MA, 2025).

=== Modern editions ===
Beginning in the 1980s, a set of scholarly editions of the text in Old English has been printed under the series title "The Anglo-Saxon Chronicle: A Collaborative Edition". They are published by D. S. Brewer under the general editorship of David Dumville and Simon Keynes. (Note: WorldCat lists an additional volume, number 11, The Northern Recension ISBN 9781843841326, but this does not appear to exist and is never cited by historians.) As of 2021, the volumes published are:

- 1. Dumville, David ed., Anglo-Saxon Chronicle 1 MS F, facsimile edition, 1995
- 3. Bately, Janet ed., Anglo-Saxon Chronicle 3 MS A, 1986
- 4. Taylor, Simon ed., Anglo-Saxon Chronicle 4 MS B, 1983
- 5. O'Brien O'Keeffe, Katherine ed., Anglo-Saxon Chronicle 5 MS C, 2000
- 6. Cubbin, G. P. ed., Anglo-Saxon Chronicle 6 MS D, 1996
- 7. Irvine, Susan ed., Anglo-Saxon Chronicle: 7. MS E, 2004
- 8. Baker, Peter ed., Anglo-Saxon Chronicle 8 MS F, 2000
- 10. Conner, Patrick ed., Anglo-Saxon Chronicle 10 The Abingdon Chronicle AD 956–1066 (MS C with ref. to BDE), 1996
- 17. Dumville, David and Lapidge, Michael eds, Anglo-Saxon Chronicle 17 The Annals of St Neots with Vita Prima Sancti Neoti, 1985

The Collaborative Edition did not include MS G because an edition by Angelika Lutz, described by Pauline Stafford as "excellent", had recently been published.

Other modern scholarly editions of different Chronicle manuscripts are as follows. The [C] manuscript has been edited by H. A. Rositzke as "The C-Text of the Old English Chronicles", in Beiträge zur Englischen Philologie, XXXIV, Bochum-Langendreer, 1940. A scholarly edition of the [D] manuscript is in An Anglo-Saxon Chronicle from British Museum Cotton MS., Tiberius B. iv, edited by E. Classen and F. E. Harmer, Manchester, 1926. The [F] text was printed in F. P. Magoun, Jr., Annales Domitiani Latini: an Edition in "Mediaeval Studies of the Pontifical Institute of Mediaeval Studies", IX, 1947, pp. 235–295.

=== Facsimiles ===
- Anglo-Saxon Chronicle A
- Anglo-Saxon Chronicle B (Cotton MS Tiberius A VI)
- Anglo-Saxon Chronicle C (Cotton MS Tiberius B I)
- Anglo-Saxon Chronicle D (Cotton MS Tiberius B IV)
- Anglo-Saxon Chronicle E
- Anglo-Saxon Chronicle F (Cotton MS Domitian A VIII)
- Anglo-Saxon Chronicle H

An earlier facsimile edition of [A], The Parker Chronicle and Laws, appeared in 1941 from Oxford University Press, edited by Robin Flower and Hugh Smith.

== Sources ==
- Abels, Richard (1998). Alfred the Great: War, Kingship and Culture in Anglo-Saxon England. Harlow, Essex: Longman. ISBN 978-0-582-04047-2.
- Baker, Peter, ed. (2000). The Anglo-Saxon Chronicle, A Collaborative Edition, 8, MS F. Cambridge, UK: D. S. Brewer. ISBN 978-0-85991-490-1.
- Bately, Janet (1978). "The Compilation of the Anglo-Saxon Chronicle, 60 BC to AD 890: Vocabulary as Evidence". Proceedings of the British Academy (64): 93–129. ISSN 0068-1202.
- Bately, Janet (1979a). "World History in the Anglo-Saxon Chronicle: Its Sources and its Separateness from the Old English Orosius". Anglo-Saxon England. 8 (8): 177–194. doi:10.1017/S0263675100003070. ISSN 1474-0532.
- Bately, Janet (1979b). "Bede and the Anglo-Saxon Chronicle". In King, Margot; Stevens, Wesley (eds.). Saints, Scholars and Heroes: Studies in Medieval Culture in Honour of Charles W. Jones. Vol. I. Collegeville, Minnesota: Hill Monastic Manuscript Library, Saint John's Abbey and University. pp. 233–254. ISBN 978-0-8357-0481-6.
- Bately, Janet (1985). "The Compilation of the Anglo-Saxon Chronicle Once More". Leeds Studies in English. new series. 16: 7–26. ISSN 2753-9105.
- Bately, Janet M. (1986). The Anglo-Saxon Chronicle: A Collaborative Edition. Vol. 3: MS. A. Cambridge: D.S. Brewer. ISBN 978-0-85991-103-0.
- Bately, Janet (1991). The Anglo-Saxon Chronicle: Texts and Textual Relationships. Reading, UK: Reading Medieval Studies. ISBN 978-0-7049-0449-1.
- Bredehoft, Thomas (2001). Textual Histories: Readings in the Anglo-Saxon Chronicle. Toronto, Canada: University of Toronto Press. ISBN 978-0-8020-4850-9.
- Campbell, James (2000). The Anglo-Saxon State. London, UK: Hambledon & London. ISBN 978-1-85285-176-7.
- Conner, Patrick (1996). The Anglo-Saxon Chronicle: A Collaborative Edition. The Abingdon Chronicle AD 956-1066 (MS C with ref. to BDE). Cambridge: D.S. Brewer. ISBN 978-0-85991-466-6.
- Crystal, David (1995). The Cambridge Encyclopedia of the English Language. Cambridge: Cambridge University Press. ISBN 978-0-521-59655-8.
- Cubbin, G. P., ed. (1996). The Anglo-Saxon Chronicle, A Collaborative Edition, 6, MS D. Cambridge, UK: D. S. Brewer. ISBN 978-0-85991-467-3.
- Dark, Ken (2000). Britain and the End of the Roman Empire. Stroud, UK: Tempus Publishing. ISBN 978-0-7524-2532-0.
- Dumville, David (1976). "The Anglian Collection of Royal Genealogies and Regnal Lists". Anglo-Saxon England. 5: 23–50. doi:10.1017/S0263675100000764. ISSN 0263-6751.
- Dumville, David (1985). "The West Saxon Genealogical Regnal List and the Chronology of Early Wessex". Peritia. 4: 21–66. doi:10.1484/J.Peri.3.96. ISSN 0332-1592.
- Dumville, David; Lapidge, Michael, eds. (1985). Anglo-Saxon Chronicle 17, The Annals of St Neots with Vita Prima Sancti Neoti. Cambridge, UK: D. S. Brewer. ISBN 978-0-85991-117-7.
- Dumville, David, ed. (1995). The Anglo-Saxon Chronicle, A Collaborative Edition, 1, Facsimile of MS. F. Cambridge, UK: D. S. Brewer. ISBN 978-0-85991-125-2.
- Earle, John (1865). Two of the Saxon chronicles parallel: with supplementary extracts from the others. Oxford, UK: Clarendon Press. OCLC 10565546.
- Earle, John; Plummer, Charles (1892–1899). Two of the Saxon Chronicles Parallel: Text, appendices and glossary. Vol. 2. Oxford, UK: Clarendon Press. OCLC 905261161.
- Ekwall, Eilert (1947). The Concise Oxford Dictionary of English Place-Names. Oxford: Clarendon Press. OCLC 3821873.
- Gneuss, Helmut (2001). Handlist of Anglo-Saxon Manuscripts: A List of Manuscripts and Manuscript Fragments Written or Owned in England up to 1100. Medieval and Renaissance Texts and Studies. Vol. 241. Tempe: Arizona Center for Medieval and Renaissance Studies. ISBN 978-0-86698-283-2.
- Grant, Raymond (1996). Laurence Nowell, William Lambarde, and the Laws of the Anglo-Saxons. Atlanta, Georgia: Rodopi. ISBN 978-90-420-0076-6.
- Greenfield, Stanley Brian (1986). A New Critical History of Old English Literature. New York: New York University Press. ISBN 0-8147-3088-4.
- Harrison, Julian (2007). "William Camden and the F-Text of the Anglo-Saxon Chronicle". Notes and Queries. 54 (3): 222–224. doi:10.1093/notesj/gjm124. ISSN 1471-6941.
- Harrison, Kenneth (1976). The Framework of Anglo-Saxon History to A.D. 900. Cambridge, UK: Cambridge University Press. ISBN 978-0-521-14392-9.
- Hart, Cyril (1997). "Some recent editions of the Anglo-Saxon Chronicle". Medium Ævum. 66 (2): 293–301. doi:10.2307/43630068. ISSN 0025-8385. JSTOR 43630068.
- Howe, Nicholas (2004). "Rome: Capital of Anglo-Saxon England". Journal of Medieval and Early Modern Studies. 34 (1): 147–172. doi:10.1215/10829636-34-1-147. ISSN 1082-9636. S2CID 170978121.
- Howorth, Henry H. (1908). "The Anglo-Saxon Chronicle: Its Origin and History". The Archaeological Journal. 65: 141–204. doi:10.1080/00665983.1908.10853082. ISSN 0066-5983.
- Irvine, Susan, ed. (2004). The Anglo-Saxon Chronicle, A Collaborative Edition, 7, MS E. Cambridge, UK: D. S. Brewer. ISBN 978-0-85991-494-9.
- Irvine, Susan (2015). "The Anglo-Saxon Chronicle". In Discenza, Nicole; Szarmach, Paul (eds.). A Companion to Alfred the Great. Brill's Companions to the Christian Tradition. Leiden, Netherlands Brill: Brill. pp. 344–367. doi:10.1163/9789004283763_014. ISBN 978-90-04-27484-6.
- John, Eric (1982). "The End of Anglo-Saxon England". In Campbell, James (ed.). The Anglo-Saxons. London, UK: Penguin Books. pp. 214–239. ISBN 978-0-14-014395-9.
- Ker, Neil Ripley (1957). Catalogue of Manuscripts Containing Anglo-Saxon. Oxford, UK: Clarendon Press. OCLC 580094.
- Keynes, Simon; Lapidge, Michael, eds. (1983). Alfred the Great: Asser's Life of King Alfred & Other Contemporary Sources. London, UK: Penguin Classics. ISBN 978-0-14-044409-4.
- Keynes, Simon (2014). "Anglo-Saxon Chronicle". In Lapidge, Michael; Blair, John; Keynes, Simon; Scragg, Donald (eds.). The Wiley Blackwell Encyclopedia of Anglo-Saxon England (2nd ed.). Chichester, West Sussex: Wiley Blackwell. pp. 37–39. ISBN 978-0-470-65632-7.
- Konshuh, Courtnay (2020). "Constructing Early Anglo-Saxon Identity in the Anglo-Saxon Chronicles". In Langlands, Alexander; Lavelle, Ryan (eds.). The Land of the English Kin: Studies in Wessex and Anglo-Saxon England in Honour of Professor Barbara Yorke. Leiden, Netherlands: Brill. pp. 154–180. ISBN 978-90-04-34949-0.
- Lutz, Angelika, ed. (1981). Die Version G der Angelsächsischen Chronik : Rekonstruktion und Edition Die Version G der Angelsächsischen Chronik : Rekonstruktion und Edition (in German and Old English). Munich, Germany: W. Fink. ISBN 9783770520213.
- McDermott, David (2018). Æthelinghood, Succession and Kingship in Late Anglo-Saxon England, with Specific Reference to Edmund II Ironside (phd thesis). Winchester, UK: The University of Winchester.
- O'Brien O'Keeffe, Katherine, ed. (2000). The Anglo-Saxon Chronicle, A Collaborative Edition, 5, MS C. Cambridge, UK: D. S. Brewer. ISBN 978-0-85991-491-8.
- Sims-Williams, Patrick (1983). "The Settlement of England in Bede and the Chronicle". Anglo-Saxon England. 12: 1–41. doi:10.1017/S0263675100003331. JSTOR 44510771.
- Stafford, Pauline (2024). After Alfred: Anglo-Saxon Chronicles and Chroniclers 900-1150. Oxford, UK: Oxford University Press. ISBN 978-0-19-287136-7.
- Stenton, Frank (1970). Stenton, D. M. (ed.). Preparatory to Anglo-Saxon England. pp. 116–26. (reprinted from 'The Foundations of English History', Transactions of the Royal Historical Society, 4th series, 9 (1926), 159–73)
- Swanton, Michael, ed. (2000). The Anglo-Saxon Chronicles (revised paperback ed.). London, UK: Phoenix. ISBN 978-1-84212-003-3.
- Taylor, Simon (1983). The Anglo-Saxon Chronicle: A Collaborative Edition. Vol. 4: MS. B. Cambridge, UK: D.S. Brewer. ISBN 978-0-85991-104-7.
- Thomas, Rebecca (2024). "Chronicling Gruffud Ap Llywelyn in the eleventh century". The Welsh History Review. 32 (2): 233–263. doi:10.16922/whr.32.2.1. ISSN 0083-792X.
- Whitelock, Dorothy; Douglas, David; Tucker, Susie, eds. (1961). The Anglo-Saxon Chronicle. London, UK: Eyre and Spottiswoode. OCLC 317315404.
- Whitelock, Dorothy, ed. (1979) [1st edition 1955]. English Historical Documents, Volume 1, c. 500–1042 (2nd ed.). London: Routledge. ISBN 978-0-415-14366-0.
- Wormald, Patrick (1982). "The Ninth Century". In Campbell, James (ed.). The Anglo-Saxons. London, UK: Penguin Books. pp. 132–159. ISBN 978-0-14-014395-9.
- Yorke, Barbara (1990). Kings and Kingdoms of Early Anglo-Saxon England. London, UK: Routledge. ISBN 978-0-415-16639-3.
- Yorke, Barbara (1993). "Fact or Fiction? The Written Evidence for the Fifth and Sixth Centuries AD". Anglo-Saxon Studies in Archaeology and History. 6: 45–50. ISSN 0264-5254.
