= Pachter =

Pachter may refer to:

- The holder of a pacht, a revenue or tax farm in the Dutch East Indies and Dutch Cape Colony

== People with the surname ==
- Charles Pachter (born 1942), Canadian contemporary artist
- Henry Pachter (1907–1980), German American political writer and philosopher
- Lior Pachter (born 1973), American computational biologist
- Marc Pachter (born 1942 or 1943), American museum director
