= Dissent (American magazine) =

American leftist magazine

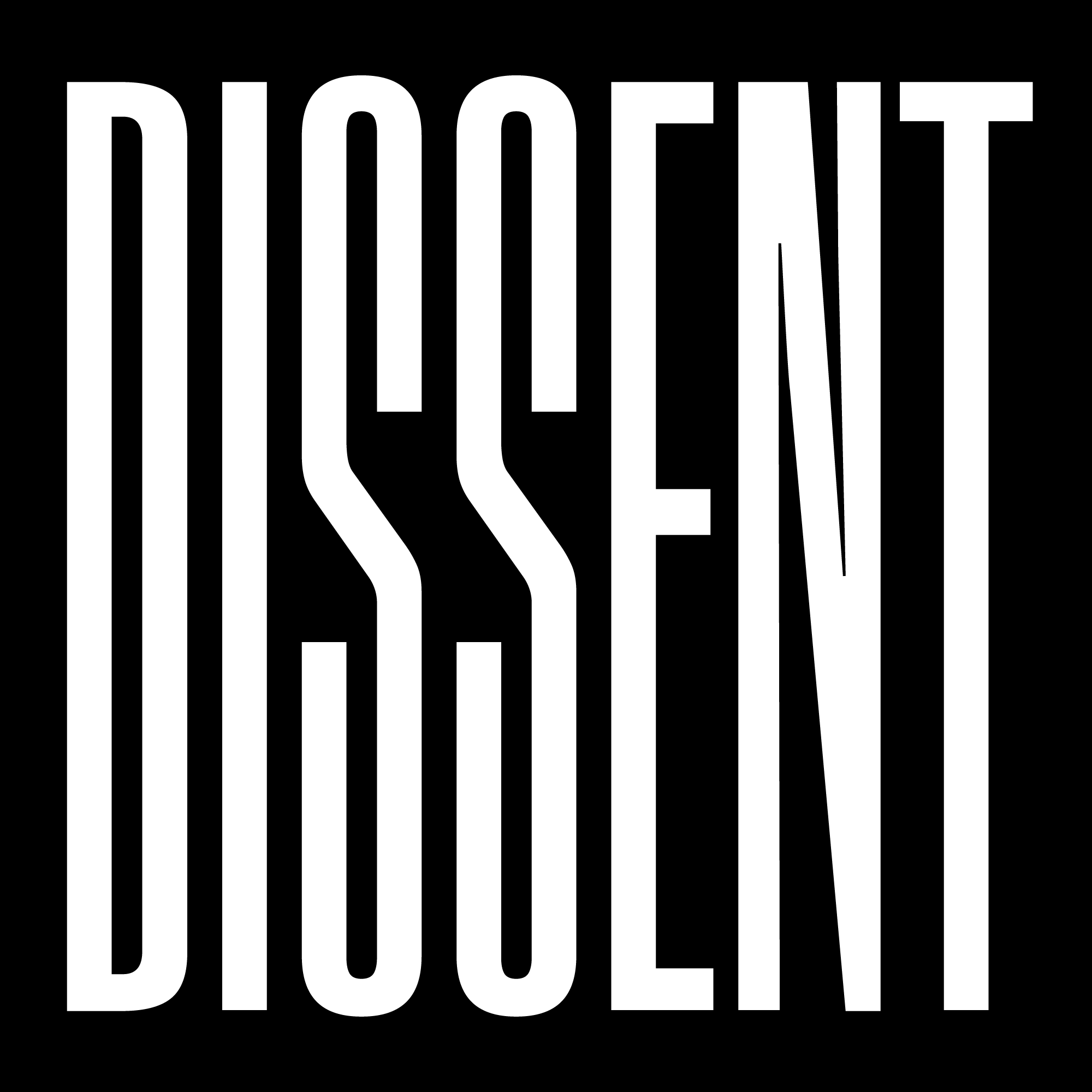

- Cover of the Summer 2016 issue
- Co-editors: Natasha Lewis; Patrick Iber
- Former editors: Timothy Shenk; Mitchell Cohen; Irving Howe; Michael Kazin; David Marcus; Michael Walzer
- Frequency: Quarterly
- Publisher: University of Pennsylvania Press on behalf of the Foundation for the Study Independent Social Ideas
- Founded: 1954
- Country: United States
- Website: www.dissentmagazine.org
- ISSN: 0012-3846 (print); 1946-0910 (web)
- OCLC: 664602786

Dissent is an American Left intellectual magazine founded in 1954. It is published by the University of Pennsylvania Press on behalf of the Foundation for the Study of Independent Social Ideas and is edited by Natasha Lewis and Patrick Iber since 2024. Former co-editors include Timothy Shenk, Irving Howe, Mitchell Cohen, Michael Walzer, and David Marcus.

== History ==
The magazine was established in 1954 by a group of New York Intellectuals, which included Lewis A. Coser, Rose Laub Coser, Irving Howe, Norman Mailer, Henry Pachter, and Meyer Schapiro. Its co-founder and publisher for its first 15 years was University Place Book Shop owner Walter Goldwater.

From its inception, Dissent's politics deviated from the standard ideological positions of the left and right. Like Politics, the New Left Review and the French socialist magazine Socialisme ou Barbarie, Dissent sought to formulate a third position between the liberalism of the West and the communism of the East. Troubled by the rampant bureaucratization of both capitalist and communist society, Dissent was home to writers like C. Wright Mills and Paul Goodman, who identified themselves as radical democrats, as well as to editors who, like Irving Howe and Michael Harrington, more closely identified with democratic socialism. Over its seven decades in publication, it has also become an influential venue for social and cultural criticism, publishing political philosophers including Michael Walzer, Cornel West, and Iris Marion Young, as well as novelists and poets such as Günter Grass and Czesław Miłosz.

In the 1960s and 70s, Dissent's skepticism toward Third World revolutions and the culture of the New Left occasionally isolated it from student movements, but its commitment to both pluralist and egalitarian politics—in particular, when it came to social and civil rights issues—separated it from both mainstream liberalism and the growing neoconservative movement. Although Dissent still identifies with the democratic socialism of its founders, including Lewis A. Coser and Rose Laub Coser, its editors and contributors represent a broad spectrum of left positions: from the Marxist humanism of Marshall Berman and Leszek Kołakowski, to the social democratic revisionism of Richard Rorty and Michael Walzer, to the radical feminism of Ellen Willis and Seyla Benhabib. In the 2010s, several of its younger editors supported the heterodox Marxism and visions of radical democracy espoused by Occupy Wall Street.

Together with the Brooklyn Institute for Social Research, Dissent's Archive project is digitizing and putting online several short-lived literary magazines, including Marxist Perspectives and democracy. It also launched a labor podcast and a new front section dedicated to cultural criticism.

== See also ==
- Know Your Enemy, a podcast sponsored by Dissent
