= Irving Howe =

American writer, literary critic, socialist activist (1920–1993)

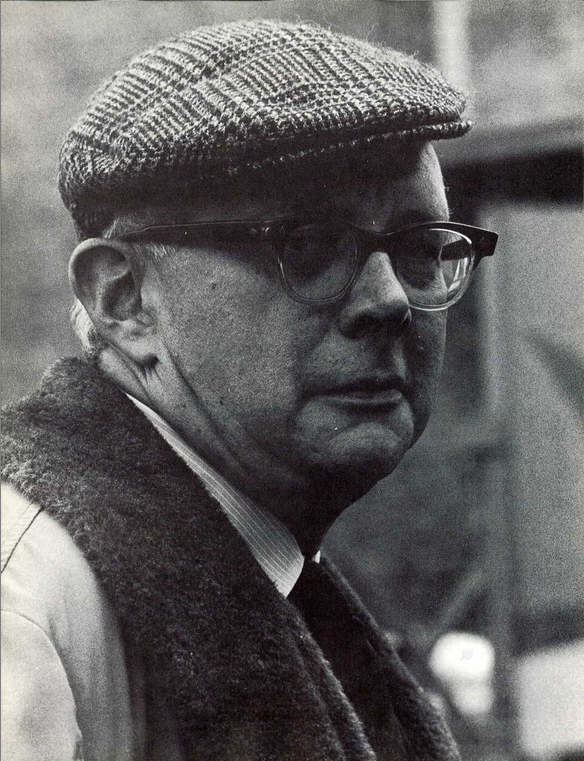
- Howe during his year as writer in residence at University of Michigan, 1967–1968
- Born: Irving Horenstein; June 11, 1920; New York City, U.S.
- Died: May 5, 1993 (aged 72); New York City, U.S.
- Education: City College of New York
- Occupations: Writer, public intellectual
- Spouses: Anna Bader (divorced); Thalia Phillies (divorced); Arien Mack (divorced); Ilana Wiener
- Children: 2, including Nicholas
- Writing career
- Notable work: World of Our Fathers (1976)

Irving Howe (né Horenstein; /haʊ/; June 11, 1920 – May 5, 1993) was an American author, literary and social critic, and a key figure in the democratic socialist movement in the U.S. He co-founded and served as longtime editor of Dissent magazine. In 1976, he wrote the National Book Award-winning World of Our Fathers, a history of East European Jews who immigrated to America.

== Early life and career ==
Howe was born Irving Horenstein in The Bronx, New York, in 1920. He was the son of Jewish immigrants from Bessarabia, Nettie (née Goldman) and David Horenstein, who ran a small grocery store that went out of business during the Great Depression. Irving's father became a peddler and eventually a presser in a dress factory. His mother was an operator in the dress trade.

Irving attended DeWitt Clinton High School in northwest Bronx, where he was already a left-wing activist. He then matriculated to City College of New York (CCNY) in 1936. He graduated alongside Daniel Bell and Irving Kristol in 1940. By summer of that year, he had changed his surname from Horenstein to Howe for political (as distinct from official) purposes. While in college, he was constantly debating socialism, Stalinism, fascism, and the meaning of Judaism.

During World War II, Howe served four years in the U.S. Army, stationed mostly at Fort Richardson near Anchorage, Alaska. Upon his return to New York, he began writing literary and cultural criticism for Partisan Review and was a frequent essayist for Commentary, Politics, The Nation, The New Republic, and The New York Review of Books. He then worked for several years as one of the resident book reviewers for Time magazine. In 1954, he co-founded the intellectual quarterly Dissent, which he edited until his death. In the 1950s, Howe taught English and Yiddish literature at Brandeis University. His anthology A Treasury of Yiddish Stories (1954), co-edited with Eliezer Greenberg, became a standard text in college courses. Howe's research and translations of Yiddish literature occurred at a time when few were appreciating or spreading knowledge about it in American universities.

== Political activist ==
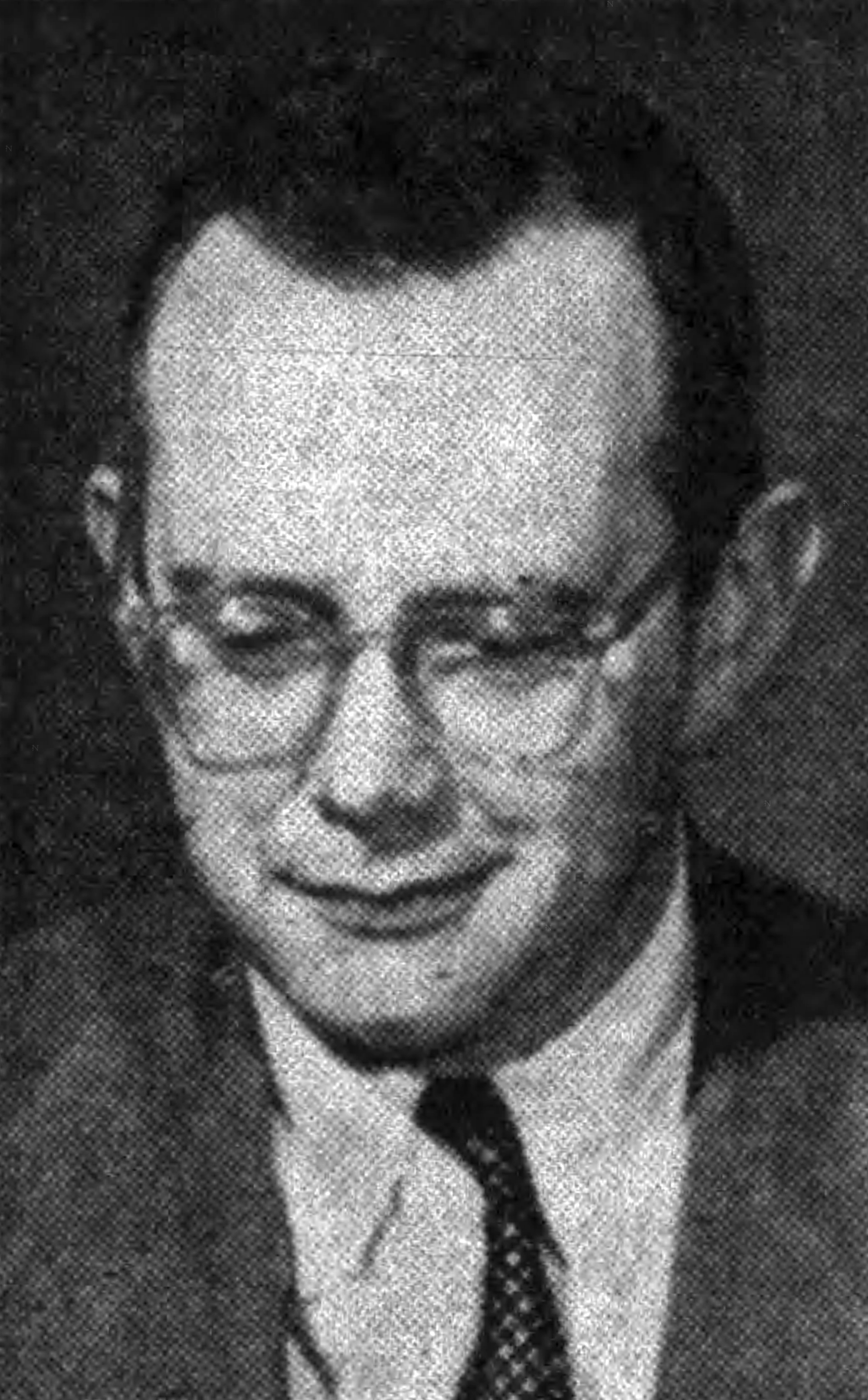
Howe c. 1956

Since his high school and CCNY days, Howe was committed to left-wing politics. A professed democratic socialist throughout his life, he was a member of the Young People's Socialist League (YPSL), joining it in the 1930s when it was under the influence of the Trotskyist Socialist Workers Party. He remained with YPSL in 1940 when it became the youth organization of Max Shachtman's Workers Party, where Howe served in a leading capacity and for a while edited its paper, Labor Action. He continued his activist role in the Workers Party when it morphed into the Independent Socialist League in 1949. He left the organization in 1952, deeming it too sectarian.

At the request of his friend Michael Harrington, Howe helped form the Democratic Socialist Organizing Committee (DSOC) in the early 1970s and served on its national board. After DSOC merged into the Democratic Socialists of America (DSA) in 1982, Howe became an Honorary Chair of the DSA.

He was a vociferous opponent of both Soviet totalitarianism and McCarthyism. He called into question standard Marxist doctrine, and came into conflict with the New Left after he criticized their brand of radicalism. In later years, his socialist politics gravitated towards a more pragmatic approach to foreign policy, a position he espoused in the pages of Dissent magazine.

He had a few famous run-ins with people on political matters. In 1969 while at Stanford University, he was verbally attacked by a group of young SDS radicals, who claimed that Howe was no longer committed to the revolution and had become status quo. Howe turned to the leader of the group and said, "You know what you're going to end up as? You're going to end up as a dentist!"

== Author, editor, translator ==
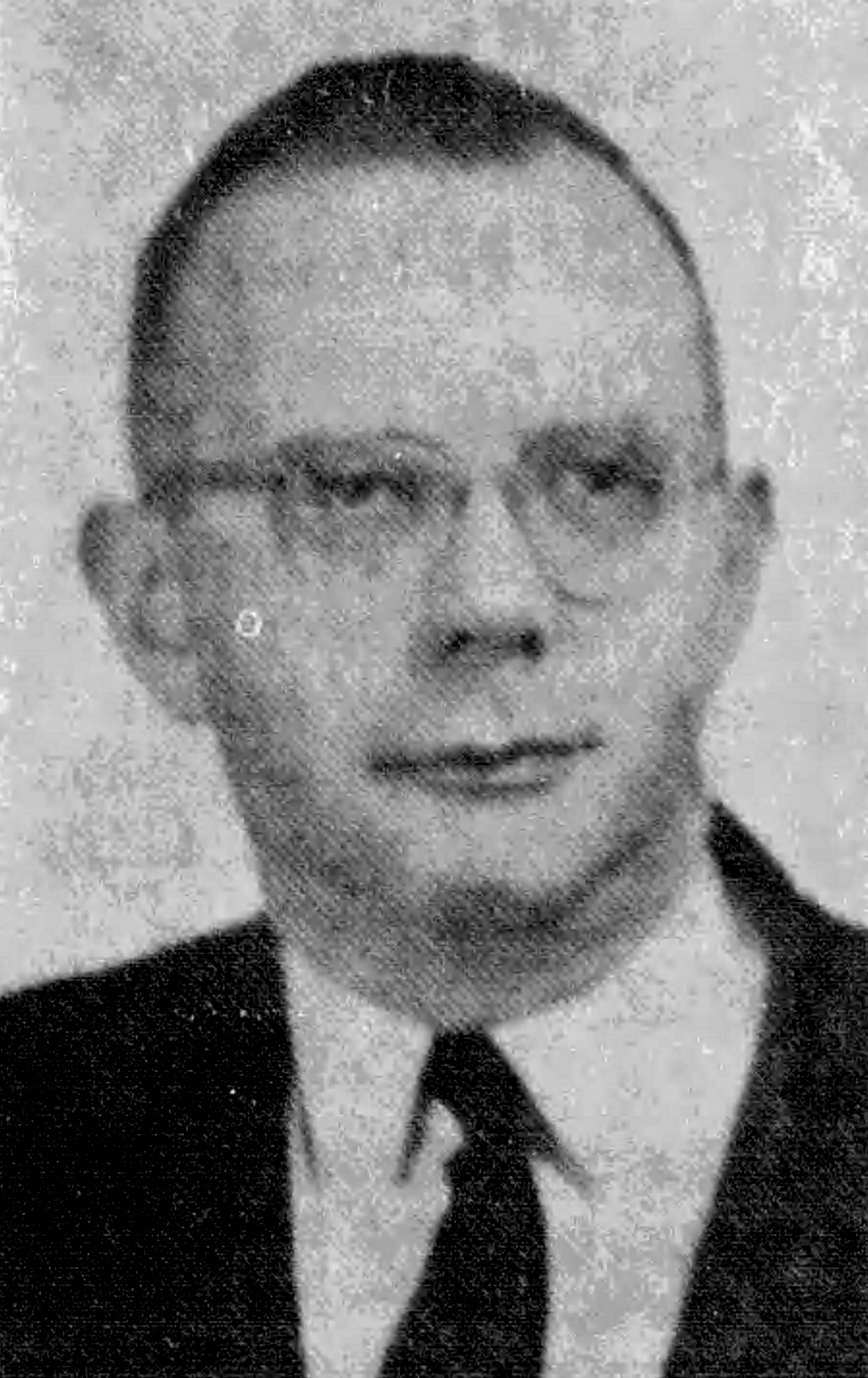
Howe c. 1957

Known for literary criticism as well as for his social and political activism, Howe wrote critical biographies of Thomas Hardy, William Faulkner, and Sherwood Anderson; a book-length examination of the relation of politics to fiction; and theoretical essays on Modernism, the nature of fiction, and Social Darwinism. He was among the first to reevaluate the works of Edwin Arlington Robinson and to help establish Robinson's reputation as a great 20th-century poet.

Howe authored numerous books including Decline of the New, World of Our Fathers, Politics and the Novel, and his autobiography, A Margin of Hope. He also wrote a biography of Leon Trotsky, who was one of his childhood heroes. Howe's writing often expressed his disapproval of capitalist America.

His exhaustive multidisciplinary history of the Jewish immigrant experience, World of Our Fathers (1976), is considered a classic of social analysis and general scholarship. The book examines the dynamic of Eastern European Jews and the culture they created in New York. It explores the once-thriving Jewish socialism of the Lower East Side—the intellectual milieu from which Howe emerged. World of Our Fathers reached No. 1 on The New York Times best-seller list for nonfiction in April 1976. The following year it won the National Book Award in History, the Francis Parkman Prize, and the National Jewish Book Award in the History category.

Howe edited and translated many Yiddish stories and commissioned the first English translation of Isaac Bashevis Singer for Partisan Review. In his assessments of Jewish-American novelists, Howe was critical of Philip Roth's early works, Goodbye Columbus and Portnoy's Complaint, as philistine and vulgar caricatures of Jewish life that pandered to the worst anti-Semitic stereotypes.

In 1987, Howe was a recipient of a MacArthur Fellowship.

== Personal life and death ==
After marriages to Anna Bader, Thalia Phillies, and Arien Mack ended in divorce, Howe married Ilana Wiener, who co-edited the anthology Short Shorts with him. From his marriage to Phillies, a classicist, he had two children, Nina and Nicholas (1953–2006).

Howe died from cardiovascular disease at Mount Sinai Hospital in Manhattan on May 5, 1993, at the age of 72.

== Legacy ==
Howe had strong political views that he would ferociously defend. Morris Dickstein, a professor at Queens College, referred to him as a "counterpuncher who tended to dissent from the prevailing orthodoxy of the moment, whether left or right, though he himself was certainly a man of the left."

Leon Wieseltier, literary editor of The New Republic, said of Howe: "He lived in three worlds, literary, political and Jewish, and he watched all of them change almost beyond recognition."

American philosopher Richard Rorty dedicated Achieving Our Country (1998)—a book about the development of 20th-century American leftist thought—to Irving Howe's memory.

Howe appeared as himself in Woody Allen's mockumentary Zelig (1983).

== Works ==
=== Books ===
Authored

- Smash the Profiteers: Vote for Security and a Living Wage. New York: Workers Party Campaign Committee, 1946.
- Don't Pay More Rent! Long Island City, NY: Workers Party Publications, 1947. Printed for the Workers Party of the United States.
- The UAW and Walter Reuther. Co-authored with B. J. Widick. New York: Random House, 1949.
- Sherwood Anderson. New York: Sloane, 1951.
- William Faulkner: A Critical Study. New York: Random House, 1952.
- The American Communist Party: A Critical History, 1919-1957. Co-authored with Lewis Coser, with the assistance of Julius Jacobson. Boston: Beacon Press, 1957.
- Politics and the Novel. New York: Horizon Press, 1957.
- The Jewish Labor Movement in America: Two Views. Co-authored with Israel Knox. New York: Jewish Labor Committee, 1957.
- Edith Wharton: A Collection of Critical Essays, editor. Englewood Cliffs, NJ: Prentice-Hall, 1962.
- T. E. Lawrence: The Problem of Heroism. The Hudson Review, Vol. 15, No. 3, 1962.
- A World More Attractive: A View of Modern Literature and Politics. New York: Horizon Press, 1963.
- Sherwood Anderson's Winesburg, Ohio. Washington, D.C.: Voice of America, 1964. American Novel Series #14
- New Styles in "Leftism". New York: League for Industrial Democracy, 1965.
- On the Nature of Communism and Relations with Communists. New York: League for Industrial Democracy, 1966.
- Steady Work: Essays in the Politics of Democratic Radicalism, 1953-1966. New York: Harcourt, Brace & World, 1966.
- Thomas Hardy. New York: Macmillan, 1967.
- The Idea of the Modern in Literature and the Arts. New York: Horizon Press, 1967.
- Literary Modernism. Greenwich, CT: Fawcett Publications, 1967.
- Student Activism. Indianapolis: Bobbs-Merrill, 1967.
- Decline of the New. New York: Harcourt, Brace & World, 1970.
- The Literature of America. Co-authored with Mark Schorer & Larzer Ziff. New York: McGraw-Hill, 1971. ISBN 9780070305717
- The Critical Point: On Literature and Culture. New York: Horizon Press, 1973.
- World of Our Fathers: The Journey of the East European Jews to America and the Life They Found and Made. New York: Harcourt Brace Jovanovich, 1976.
- New Perspectives: The Diaspora and Israel. Co-authored with Matityahu Peled. New York: Harcourt Brace Jovanovich, 1976
- Trotsky. London: Fontana Modern Masters, 1978.
- Leon Trotsky. New York: Viking Press, 1978
- Celebrations and Attacks: Thirty Years of Literary and Cultural Commentary. New York: Horizon Press, 1979. ISBN 0818011769
- The Threat of Conservatism. Co-authored with Gus Tyler & Peter Steinfels. New York: Foundation for the Study of Independent Social Ideas, 1980.
- The Making of a Critic, Bennington, VT: Bennington College, 1982. Ben Belitt lectureship series, #5.
- A Margin of Hope: An Intellectual Autobiography. Harcourt Brace Jovanovich, 1982. ISBN 0151571384
- Socialism and America. San Diego: Harcourt Brace Jovanovich, 1985. ISBN 0151835756
- The American Newness: Culture and Politics in the Age of Emerson. Cambridge, MA: Harvard University Press, 1986. ISBN 0674026403
- American Jews and Liberalism. Co-authored with Michael Walzer, Leonard Fein & Mitchell Cohen. New York: Foundation for the Study of Independent Social Ideas, 1986.
- The Return of Terrorism. Bronx, NY: Lehman College of the City University of New York, 1989. Herbert H. Lehman memorial lecture, Lehman College publications, #22.
- Selected Writings, 1950-1990 San Diego: Harcourt Brace, 1990.
- A Critic's Notebook. Edited and introduced by Nicholas Howe. New York: Harcourt Brace, 1994.
- "The End of Jewish Secularism". New York: Hunter College of the City University of New York, 1995. A lecture by Howe that became the first in a Hunter College series entitled Occasional Papers in Jewish History and Thought.

Edited

- Gissing, George. New Grub Street. Boston: Houghton Mifflin, 1962.
- Poverty: Views from the Left, co-edited with Jeremy Larner. New York: Apollo, 1962.
- The Basic Writings of Trotsky. New York: Random House, 1963.
- The Radical Papers. New York: Doubleday, 1966.
- Shoptalk: An Instructor's Manual for Classics of Modern Fiction: Eight Short Novels. New York: Harcourt, Brace & World, 1968.
- Beyond the New Left. New York: McCall Publishing Co., 1970. ISBN 0841500215
- The New Conservatives: A Critique From the Left, co-edited with Lewis A. Coser. New York: Quadrangle/The New York Times Book Co., 1974. ISBN 0812904184
- Yiddish Stories: Old and New, co-edited with Eliezer Greenberg. New York: Avon Books, 1977. ISBN 978-0380008872
- The Best of Sholem Aleichem, co-edited with Ruth R. Wisse. Washington: New Republic Books, 1979. ISBN 0915220482
- How We Lived: A Documentary History of Immigrant Jews in America, 1880-1930, co-edited with Kenneth Libo. New York: R. Marek, 1979.
- The Portable Kipling. New York: Viking Press, 1982.
- Beyond the Welfare State. New York: Schocken Books, 1982.
- Short Shorts: An Anthology of the Shortest Stories, co-edited with Ilana Wiener Howe. Boston, MA: D.R. Godine, 1982.
- 1984 Revisited: Totalitarianism in Our Century. New York: Harper & Row, 1983. ISBN 0060151587

Contributed

- "Introduction". New Grub Street, by George Gissing. Boston: Houghton Mifflin, 1962.
- "Notes on the Welfare State". Poverty: Views from the Left, co-edited with Jeremy Larner. New York: Apollo, 1962, pp. 293–314.
- "Introduction". The Basic Writings of Trotsky, edited by Irving Howe. New York: Random House, 1963.
- "Afterword". An American Tragedy, by Theodore Dreiser. New York: Signet Classic, 1964.
- "Are American Jews Turning to the Right?" The New Conservatives: A Critique From the Left, edited by Daniel Bell & Lewis A. Coser. New York: Quadrangle/The New York Times Book Co., 1974. ISBN 0812904184
- "Introduction". Short Shorts: An Anthology of the Shortest Stories, co-edited with Ilana Wiener Howe. Boston, MA: D.R. Godine, 1982.

Translated

- Baeck, Leo. The Essence of Judaism, translated by Irving Howe and Victor Grubwieser. New York: Schocken Books, 1948.

=== Articles and introductions ===
- A Treasury of Yiddish Stories, co-edited with Eliezer Greenberg, New York: Viking Press, 1954.
- Modern literary criticism: An anthology, editor, Boston: Beacon Press, 1958.
- "New York in the Thirties: Some Fragments of Memory," Dissent, vol. 8, no. 3 (Summer 1961), pp. 241–250.
- The Historical Novel by Georg Lukacs, preface by Irving Howe, Boston: Beacon Press, 1963
- Orwell's Nineteen Eighty-Four: Text, Sources, Criticism, editor, New York: Harcourt, Brace and World, 1963. (Second edition 1982)
- The Merry-Go-Round of Love and selected stories by Luigi Pirandello, trans. Frances Keene and Lily Duplaix, with a foreword by Irving Howe, New York: The New American Library of World Literature, 1964.
- Jude the Obscure by Thomas Hardy, edited with an introduction by Irving Howe, Boston: Houghton Mifflin, 1965.
- Selected writings: stories, poems and essays by Thomas Hardy, edited with an introduction by Irving Howe, Greenwich, Conn.: Fawcett Publications, 1966.
- Selected short stories of Isaac Bashevis Singer, edited with an introduction by Irving Howe, New York: Modern Library, 1966.
- The Radical Imagination: An Anthology from Dissent Magazine, editor, New York: New American Library, 1967.
- A Dissenter's Guide to Foreign Policy, editor, New York: Praeger, 1968.
- Classics of modern fiction; eight short novels, editor, New York: Harcourt, Brace & World, 1968.
- A Treasury of Yiddish Poetry, co-edited with Eliezer Greenberg, New York: Holt, Rinehart and Winston, 1969.
- Essential works of socialism, editor, New York: Holt, Rinehart and Winston, 1970.
- The Literature of America: Nineteenth Century, editor, New York: McGraw-Hill, 1970.
- Israel, the Arabs, and the Middle East, co-edited with Carl Gershman, New York: Quadrangle Books, 1970.
- Voices from the Yiddish: Essays, Memoirs, Diaries, co-edited with Eliezer Greenberg, Ann Arbor: University of Michigan Press, 1972.
- The Seventies: Problems and Proposals, co-edited with Michael Harrington, New York: Harper & Row, 1972.
- The World of the Blue-Collar Worker, editor, New York: Quadrangle Books, 1972.
- Yiddish stories, old and new, co-edited with Eliezer Greenberg, New York: Holiday House, 1974.
- Herzog: Text and Criticism by Saul Bellow, editor, New York: Viking Press, 1976.
- Jewish-American stories, editor, New York: New American Library, 1977.
- Ashes Out of Hope: Fiction by Soviet-Yiddish writers, co-edited with Eliezer Greenberg, New York: Schocken Books, 1977.
- Literature as Experience: An Anthology, co-edited with John Hollander and David Bromwich, New York: Harcourt Brace Jovanovich, 1979.
- Twenty-five years of Dissent: An American tradition, compiled and with an introduction by Irving Howe, New York: Methuen, 1979.
- 1984 revisited: Totalitarianism in Our Century, editor, New York: Harper & Row, 1983.
- Alternatives, proposals for America from the democratic left, editor, New York: Pantheon Books, 1984.
- We lived there, too: in their own words and pictures—pioneer Jews and the westward movement of America, 1630-1930, editor with Kenneth Libo, New York: St. Martin's/Marek, 1984.
- The Penguin book of modern Yiddish verse, co-edited with Ruth Wisse and Chone Shmeruk, New York: Viking Press, 1987.
- Oliver Twist by Charles Dickens, introduction, New York: Bantam, 1990.
- The Castle by Franz Kafka, introduction, London: David Campbell Publishers, 1992.
- Little Dorrit by Charles Dickens, introduction, London: David Campbell Publishers, 1992.
