= Lewis A. Coser =

German-American sociologist, educator, and social justice activist

- Born: November 27, 1913
- Died: July 8, 2003 (aged 89)

Academic background
- Education: Columbia University
- Thesis: Toward a Sociology of Social Conflict (1954)
- Doctoral advisor: Robert K. Merton

Academic work
- Institutions: University of Chicago; University of California; Brandeis University; Stony Brook University
- Doctoral students: Aldon Morris, Walter W. Powell

Lewis Alfred Coser (27 November 1913 in Berlin – 8 July 2003 in Cambridge, Massachusetts) was a German-American sociologist, serving as the 66th president of the American Sociological Association in 1975.

== Biography ==
Born in Berlin as Ludwig Cohen, his father was a successful Jewish industrialist. In 1933 he emigrated to Paris and in 1941 he left war-torn Paris for the United States where he married Rose Laub. In the Fifties, he enrolled as a graduate student in sociology at Columbia University, taking his PhD at the age of forty-one. Coser first taught at the University of Chicago and the University of California. He then founded the sociology department at Brandeis University and taught there for 15 years before joining the sociology department of the State University of New York at Stony Brook. Coser frequently worked with the eminent sociologist and his spouse, Rose Laub Coser.

== Sociology ==
Coser was the first sociologist to try to bring together structural functionalism and conflict theory; his work was focused on finding the functions of social conflict. Coser argued – with Georg Simmel – that conflict might serve to solidify a loosely structured group. In a society that seems to be disintegrating, conflict with another society, inter-group conflict, may restore the integrative core. For example, the cohesiveness of Israeli Jews might be attributed to the long-standing conflict with the Arabs. Conflict with one group may also serve to produce cohesion by leading to a series of alliances with other groups.

Conflicts within a society, intra-group conflict, can bring some ordinarily isolated individuals into an active role. The protest over the Vietnam War motivated many young people to take vigorous roles in American political life for the first time.

Conflicts also serve a communication function. Prior to conflict, groups may be unsure of their adversary's position, but as a result of conflict, positions and boundaries between groups often become clarified, leaving individuals better able to decide on a proper course of action in relation to their adversary.

Much like status consistency, conflicts along the same cleavages intensify the severity of the conflict. Cross-cutting cleavages tend to dissipate the severity of the conflict. For example, the coincidence of economic and political disenfranchisement among Palestinians in the West Bank intensify their conflict with Israeli Jews. In contrast, the non-coincidence of economic and political disenfranchisement among Quebecers reduces somewhat the severity of their conflict with English Canada, especially with the rising prosperity of the French Canadian new middle class operating in the public sector and corporate world.

== Politics ==
Coser was active within the anti-Stalinist left, and was close to the independent leftists known as the New York intellectuals. A eulogy at Carlo Tresca's memorial service in 1943 was delivered by Angelica Balabanoff, the socialist activist and former Bolshevik. According to Coser's account of the funeral, "I was sitting near a burly Irish policeman who clearly didn't understand a word of Balabanoff's fierce Italian oratory. But at her climax he burst into tears."

In 1954, with Irving Howe, Coser established the radical journal, Dissent. Upon his death in 2003, the author of his obituary in that magazine suggested that Coser "always felt himself a marginal man. He was Jewish and non-Jewish; an American and a European; a hardheaded social analyst, committed to rigorous honesty in judgment and deed, and a passionate advocate; a leftist and a critic of the left; a defender of the underdog and something of an elite intellectual mandarin."

His The new conservatives: A critique from the left (with Irving Howe, 1974) was one of the first major works to define and analyse neoconservatism.

== Works ==
- The Functions of Social Conflict, 1956
- The American Communist Party (with Irving Howe), 1957
- Sociology Through Literature: An Introductory Reader, 1963
- Sociological Theory, 1964
- Men of ideas, 1965
- Political Sociology, 1967
- Continuities in the Study of Social Conflict, 1967
- A Handful of Thistles: Collected Papers in Moral Conviction, 1968
- Sociological Theory (with Bernard Rosenberg), 1969
- Masters of Sociological Thought, 1970
- The Seventies: Problems and Proposals (with Irving Howe), 1972
- Greedy Institutions, 1974
- The New Conservatives: A Critique from the Left (with Irving Howe), 1974
- The Idea of Social Structure, Papers in Honor of R. K. Merton, 1975
- The Uses of Controversy in Sociology, 1976
- Refugee Scholars in America, 1984
- Conflict and Consensus, 1984
- Books: The Culture and Commerce of Publishing (with Charles Kadushin and Walter W. Powell), 1985
- Voices of Dissent (with Maurice Halbwachs), 1992
