= Robert Talbot (scribe) =

English scholar and scribe of Anglo-Saxon

Robert Talbot (1505/6–1558) was an English antiquary and scribe of Anglo-Saxon. He was educated at Winchester College and New College, Oxford, where he obtained his BA in 1525 and his MA in 1529. He subsequently became a schoolmaster at Brentwood, Essex, held various ecclesiastical benefices, and served as a chaplain to Archbishop Thomas Cranmer. In 1547 he became a prebendary and canon of Norwich Cathedral.

He is chiefly remembered for his Annotationes in eam partem Itinerarii Antonini quae ad Britanniam spectat, a topographical analysis of the Roman Antonine Itinerary: this remained unpublished in his lifetime, but was known to scholars including William Camden. He also transcribed several Anglo-Saxon charters, and attempted to analyse their topographical content. Marginalia in his hand are found in the F manuscript of the Anglo-Saxon Chronicle, British Library Cotton MS Domitian A VIII.
