= Nicholas Howe =

American scholar

- Born: February 17, 1953; Princeton, New Jersey, US
- Died: September 27, 2006 (aged 53)
- Education: York University (BA); Yale University (PhD)
- Occupations: Writer, scholar
- Parents: Irving Howe (father); Thalia Phillies (mother)

Nicholas Howe (February 17, 1953 – September 27, 2006) was an American scholar of Old English literature and culture, whose Migration and Mythmaking in Anglo-Saxon England (1989) was an important contribution to the study of Old English literature and historiography.

== Biography ==
Howe was born in Princeton, New Jersey, on February 17, 1953, a child of academic parents: his father, Irving Howe (1920–1993), was a celebrated literary critic, historian of Jewish immigrants to America and a prominent American socialist; his mother, Thalia Phillies, was a classicist and academic. Howe received a B.A. in English from York University (1974) and a PhD in English from Yale University (1978). His dissertation, The Latin Encyclopedia Tradition and Old English Poetry, was the basis for The Old English Catalogue Poems: A Study in Poetic Form (1985). He taught at Rutgers University (1978–85), then at the University of Oklahoma (until 1991), and then at Ohio State University where he led the Center for Medieval and Renaissance Studies (1995–2002). In 2002 he moved to California, to the University of California, Berkeley. He died of leukemia on September 27, 2006.

== Scholarship and influence ==
Howe's Migration and Mythmaking, first published in 1989 and reprinted in 2001, was a study of Anglo-Saxon culture and literature. Howe argued that the Anglo-Saxons, descendants of peoples who had traveled from continental Europe to settle Britain and then returned to Europe to convert their pagan forebears (Howe discusses Wilfrid, Saint Willibrord, and Saint Boniface, in connection with such poems as Beowulf and Exodus), were very conscious of their return to Europe and saw themselves as an integral part of and parallel to "the Israelite and Hebrew migration in biblical history". The book "influenced a generation of scholars".

In addition to his scholarship of Old English (and he was fond of discussing and publishing on parallels between Old English and modern culture and literature), Howe had an interest in geography and in American landscape and culture (including "theme parks, fast-food America, and construction cranes"), and published a number of (academic) articles in that field. His Across an Inland Sea: Writing in Place from Buffalo to Berlin is a memoir of recollections and travel writing.

== Selected works ==
- The Old English Catalogue Poems: A Study in Poetic Form (1985)
- Migration and Mythmaking in Anglo-Saxon England (1989)
- Across an Inland Sea: Writing in Place from Buffalo to Berlin (2003)
- Home and Homelessness in the Medieval and Renaissance World (U of Notre Dame P, 2004)
- Writing the Map of Anglo-Saxon England: Essays in Cultural Geography (Yale UP, 2007)
- Howe, Nicholas (2012). "Who's Afraid of Translating Beowulf?". In Schulman, Jana K. & Szarmach, Paul E. (eds.). Beowulf at Kalamazoo: Essays on Translation and Performance. Kalamazoo: Medieval Institute Publications, Western Michigan University. pp. 31–49. ISBN 978-1-58044-152-0.

== Honors ==
Howe held a Guggenheim Fellowship (2002–2003) and was elected a Fellow of the Medieval Academy of America in 2005.
