= Henry Pachter =

American philosopher

Henry Pachter (1907–1980) was a Marxist intellectual and a libertarian socialist activist. Perhaps best known as an essayist, who dealt with both historical and political matters, he also authored a number of books on a variety of subjects. An exile from the Nazi regime, deeply concerned with the lessons offered by the Weimar Republic, he taught at the New School for Social Research and then at the City College of the City University of New York until his death in 1980.

== Biography ==
Born in 1907 in Berlin, Pachter joined the German Youth Movement as a teenager and, following a split in its ranks, the German Communist Party (KPD) in 1926. He enrolled in the history department at the University of Berlin and, by 1928, found himself expelled from the KPD. He then joined the Social Democratic Party (SPD), where he worked under Rudolf Hilferding at the legendary journal, Society, and finished his dissertation in 1932 on “The Proletariat Before 1848.” He would remain a libertarian socialist for the rest of his life. By the end of 1933, Pachter had been forced to flee to Paris where he took odd jobs, taught at the Universite Populaire, agitated for creating a “popular front” of all antifascist forces, and ultimately served as a publicist for the POUM, a mixed group of Trotskyist and socialists that served the loyalist cause during the Spanish Civil War. Briefly a member of the anti-Nazi underground in which he helped edit probably the first resistance journal, Proletarian Action, he wound up in the Gurs prison camp, before coming to the United States in 1940. Soon enough he was working for the Office of Strategic Services, and part-time for the Institute for Social Research at Columbia University, before becoming a founding member of Dissent and entering the academy.

== Theoretical contributions ==
Henry Pachter understood Marxism as a critical method capable of questioning its political employment from a historical and materialist standpoint that emphasized the ability of the working class (rather than a party) to control its destiny. He never viewed it as a “science” or a form of economics guaranteeing the inevitable victory of the proletariat. In this respect, his intellectual lineage derived from Karl Korsch and the libertarian socialism associated with Rosa Luxemburg. His writings were primarily inspired by his political commitments: a work on the Weimar Republic and the Spanish Civil War; a study of economic policy under Mussolini and another dealing with the fascist use of language; the character of authoritarian political parties; foreign policy; the role of reform, and the meaning of socialism. In Pachter's view, socialism exhibited a fundamental tension between its need to engage the world even as it projects a vision of society as it should be. That tension prevented Pachter from identifying socialism with any movement or party. Indeed, as he once put the matter: “One cannot have socialism; one is a socialist.”

== Works ==
- Socialism in History: Political Writings of Henry Pachter, ed. Stephen Eric Bronner
- Weimar Etudes, ed. Stephen Eric Bronner (New York: Columbia University Press, 1982). ISBN 0-231-05360-6
- "Brecht's Personal Politics," Telos 44 (Summer 1980).
- Modern Germany: A Social, Cultural, and Political History, (Boulder: Westview Press, 1979). ISBN 0-89158-166-9
- The Fall and Rise of Europe (1975)
- Russia as a World Power; published in German as Weltmacht Russland (1968)
- Collision Course: The Cuban Missile Crisis and Coexistence (1963)
- Magic into Science: The Story of Paracelsus (New York: Henry Schumann, 1951).
- The Spanish Crucible (1937); translated from Spanish into French as Espagne 1936–1937: La guerre devore la revolution (1986).

=== Compilations ===
- Socialism in History: Political Essays of Henry Pachter (edited by Stephen Bronner) (New York: Columbia University Press, 1984). ISBN 0-231-05660-5
