= Mitchell Cohen =

American political scientist, author, essayist, critic and magazine editor

Mitchell Cohen is an author, essayist and critic. He is professor of political science at Baruch College of the City University of New York and the CUNY Graduate Center. From 1991 to 2009, he was co-editor of Dissent, one of the United States' leading intellectual quarterlies. He is now an Editor Emeritus.

== Biography ==
Born in New York City in 1952, he received his doctorate from Columbia University. While in high school he volunteered for the Eugene McCarthy for President campaign (1968), the Norman Mailer-Jimmy Breslin primary campaign (1969) and the Paul O’Dwyer for Senate campaign (1970). Cohen did undergraduate studies at Case Western Reserve University in Cleveland and the Hebrew University of Jerusalem.

== Work ==
Cohen's articles and books treat diverse themes ranging from social democratic theory and the idea of cosmopolitanism to the relation between political ideas and culture, especially opera. He defines himself as a "social democratic" humanist or a "liberal socialist" and coined the term “rooted cosmopolitanism” to describe how a citizen can be linked to his or her own society while also being a universalist. His essay "Why Lenin’s Critics were Right" (Dissent, Fall 2017), defended left-wing critics of Bolshevism. Cohen covered the revolutions of 1989 on the ground in East Berlin and Budapest for Dissent.

He has guest lectured at numerous European and American universities, was National Endowment for the Humanities Fellow at the Institute for Advanced Study, Princeton and a visiting professor at Stanford University. He was City University of New York Writing Fellow at the Levy Biography Center. He was American "Correspondent" of Raisons politiques and is a member of the editorial boards of Jewish Social Studies and Israel Studies Review. His articles and essays have appeared in numerous publications and languages including the Times Literary Supplement, Les Temps Modernes, Musik & Aesthetik, Nexus, and the New York Times Book Review. His book The Wager of Lucien Goldmann is a sympathetic study of the thought of a Romanian-French Marxist humanist intellectual. His book Zion and State examines the origins of the conflict between the left and right in Israel, focusing especially on the question of whether a state is a means or an end in itself.

Cohen's book The Politics of Opera: A History from Monteverdi to Mozart (Princeton, 2017, paperback, 2020) is a study of the relation between political ideas and opera from the birth of opera, circa 1600, through the French Revolution, focusing on Florence, Mantua, Venice, Paris and Vienna. It received the Prose Award for Music from the Association of American Publishers. It was named one of the best books of the year in the London Evening Standard and Cohen also received for it the Presidential Achievement Award for Excellence in Scholarship of Baruch College of the City University of New York. The Politics of Opera was short-listed for the Shannon Prize in European Studies.

== Selected bibliography ==
=== Books ===
- The Politics of Opera: A History from Monteverdi to Mozart (Princeton University Press)
- The Wager of Lucien Goldmann (Princeton University Press)
- Zion and State: Nation, Class and the Shaping of Modern Israel (Blackwell and Columbia University Press; in French edition: Editions la Découverte)

=== Edited collections ===
- Editor, Princeton Readings in Political Thought: 2nd Edition (Princeton University Press, 2018)
- Editor, Rebels and Reactionaries: An Anthology of Great Political Stories (Dell Books)
- Editor, Class Struggle and the Jewish Nation: Selected Essays by Ber Borochov. Transaction Books: New Brunswick, New Jersey, 1984.

=== Select articles ===
- "Irving Howe: A Socialist Life," Dissent, Fall 2020.
- "New York-la-Virale," Esprit (Paris), May 20, 2020. Short English version: "Beyond the Virus," Dissent, April 9, 2020.
- "In Edgy Times," Nexus (Amsterdam), Winter 2020.
- "The Example of Agnès Heller," Dissent, Fall 2019.
- "Labor Zionism, the State and Beyond: An Interpretation of Changing Realities and Changing Histories," Israel Studies Review, Winter 2015.
- "France: Right Rumbles, Left Wobbles," Dissent, February 19, 2014
- "The Left Today: A Social Democratic View. Interview with Mitchell Cohen," Dissent and Phase 2, September 8, 2008.
- "Les fondements de l'idée socialiste aujourd'hui: table ronde," in L'idée socialiste aujourd’hui: Colloque (Paris: Fondation Jean-Jaurès/Plon, 2001).
- "Why Lenin's Critics were Right," Dissent, Fall 2017.
- "Does the Left have a 'Zionist Problem'?," in J. Jacobs., ed., Jews and Leftist Politics (Cambridge University Press, 2017).
- "Is there a Crisis in Jewish Political Culture?", Jewish Social Studies Spring-Summer, 2017.
- "The Values of Dissent," Dissent, Winter 2014.
- "Why I am still ‘Left’," Dissent, Spring 1997
- "Perry Anderson and the House of Anti-Imperialism," Fathom, April 2016.
- "A Dissident Moses in Paris and Berlin," Jewish Review of Books, April 2016.
- "Rooted Cosmopolitanism," Dissent, Fall 1990.
- "Decades of Dissent," Introduction to N. Mills and M. Walzer eds. Fifty Years of Dissent Magazine (Yale Univ. Press).
- "Should we trust Intellectuals?," Common Knowledge, Winter 2010.
- "Reconsidering T.H. Marshall's 'Citizenship and Social Class," Policy Network On-Line, Series on Classics of Social Democratic Thought, Summer 2010; and in Dissent, Fall 2010.
- "What is to be Learned?," Dissent, Fall 2010.
- “The Other George (Lichtheim on Imperialism),” Dissent, Winter 2009.
- "An Empire of Cant: Hardt, Negri and Post-Modern Political Theory," Dissent, Summer 2002.
- "Introduction," Fifty Years of Dissent (Yale University Press, 2004).
- "In the Murk of it: Iraq Reconsidered," in T. Cushman ed., A Matter of Principle (University of California Press)
- "France: Red Rose, Blue Grip," Dissent, Fall 2007,
- "A Roasted Cat will never make a hare-pie': Thoughts on Political Opera," in Musik & Ästhetik; and Raisons politiques, May 2004.
- “The New Atheism: An Interview with Mitchell Cohen,” Dissent online (Fall 2007) at (https://www.dissentmagazine.org/online_articles/the-new-atheism)
- “Anti-Semitism and the Left that Doesn’t Learn,” Dissent, Winter 2008 and online at (https://www.dissentmagazine.org/online_articles/anti-semitism-and-the-left-that-doesnt-learn).
- “To the Dresden Barricades: The Genesis of Richard Wagner’s Political Ideas,” T. Grey, ed. The Cambridge Companion to Wagner (Cambridge University Press, 2008).
- Elisabetta Ambrosi, "The Turin Book Fair Controversy: Interview with Mitchell Cohen," Reset Magazine (Rome, March 11, 2008) Online at (https://www.dissentmagazine.org/online_articles/turin-controversy-missing-the-point)
- "Notes on Jewish Crises". TELOS 33 (Fall 1977). New York: Telos Press
