= Kenneth Libo =

Kenneth Harold Libo (December 4, 1937 – March 29, 2012) was an American historian of Jewish immigration who is known for working with writer Irving Howe.

Libo attend Norwich Free Academy and graduated from Dartmouth College in 1959. In 1974, he received his PhD in English literature from the City University of New York. In 1980, he became the first English-language editor of The Jewish Daily Forward.
