= Transaction Man =

Non-fiction book by Nicholas Lemann about American economy and public policy

Transaction Man: The Rise of the Deal and the Decline of the American Dream
- First edition cover
- Author: Nicholas Lemann
- Publisher: Farrar, Straus and Giroux
- Publication date: 2019
- Publication place: New York
- Pages: 306
- ISBN: 978-0-374-27788-8
- OCLC: 1082560305

Transaction Man: The Rise of the Deal and the Decline of the American Dream is a non-fiction book which chronicles the role of corporations in relation to the American economy and shifts in public policy by Nicholas Lemann, who is a veteran journalist and a The New Yorker staff writer.

== Summary ==
Lemann provides a history and impact on the American economy of three economic and social thinkers. He described the history of corporations, economic conditions, and policies in the United States in the 20th century.

== Background ==
Lemann (b. 1954-) first worked as a journalist in his natal city, New Orleans. He worked for the Washington Monthly, The Washington Post, and the Texas Monthly. Over his long career in journalism, he contributed to several national magazines in the United States, including The Atlantic Monthly and The New Yorker. He also served as dean of the Columbia University Graduate School of Journalism. In 1991 he wrote The Promised Land: The Great Black Migration and How It Changed America

== Description ==
Lemann's book, which was described by David Leonhardt in his New York Times review as a sequel to William H. Whyte's 1956 The Organization Man, is a "story about a battle of ideas between the people who built postwar American culture and their critics, like Whyte."

Babinder Bradley's review in NPR said that the "broad strokes" in Transaction Man reflect the narrative that explains why the economy failed post 2008—a narrative that was made familiar through Michael Lewis's book The Big Short and the film based on the book directed by Adam McKay. Bradley said that Transaction Man "seeks to put the turn that led us there into context and take a look at where things have gone since."

Babinder described how Transaction Man provides the "top-down" worldviews of Adolf A. Berle Jr. (1895 – 1971), Michael C. Jensen (born November 30, 1939), and LinkedIn's Reid Hoffman (born August 5, 1967)—who were the epitomes of the seismic changes that they helped create—and supplements these views by "detailing the on-the-ground stories of those who lived the consequences." For example, he includes "stories of people living in the Chicago neighborhood of Chicago Lawn, who were impacted by Jensen, the economist, "whose theories undergirded much of the financialization in the 20th century, representative of the Transaction Man."

In Chapter 1, "Institution man", Lemann began by describing some of the early policies and laws that limited the power of big business, including the Sherman Antitrust Act of 1890 and the 1911 Supreme Court ruling to dismantle the Standard Oil Company for violation of federal antitrust law. John D. Rockefeller, who had founded in 1870, who some consider to be the wealthiest American of all time, and the richest person in modern history. Lemann devotes much of chapter 1, to the life and work of Adolf A. Berle Jr. (1895 – 1971) who introduced a revised theory of the firm, as described in The Modern Corporation and Private Property (1932) —a detailed empirical study with "statistical evidence" provided by Gardiner Means. In 'The Modern Corporation, it revealed "how big and powerful corporations had become". and that the control of corporations—whose shares were held by many shareholders—was in the hands of managers who owned very little equity in the corporation.

Lemann described Berle's Modern Corporation, which "became a classic almost instantly", as the "main intellectual achievement of Berle's life." Lehman described how Berle's book differed from earlier publications about corporations—Thorstein Veblen's Absentee Ownership: Business Enterprise in Recent Times (1923), and William Z. Ripley's Main Street and Wall Street (1927). These two books "were essentially hostile to corporations" and focused on "shenanigans", according to Lemann, whereas Berle combined a "much broader historical and social perspective" along with detailed statistical evidence. As well, The Modern Corporation was published following the Wall Street Crash of 1929 when the Great Depression was underway. Public sentiment had shifted from the glorification of corporate achievements in the 1920s, which had led to a "delirious moneymaking opportunity for the growing American middle class", to questioning the 1920s "economic arrangements" that "had utterly failed and needed to be replaced." Berle raised concerns that what he "called the corporate revolution was every bit as significant as the Industrial Revolution." He warned against the concentration of power as a "relatively small number of corporations had rapidly come to dominate the American economy." Berle believed that the problem was not with finance or the big corporation itself. He believed the "government had to be empowered to counteract it." In 1932, Berle wrote "The Nature of the Difficulty", a memorandum, in which he said that "for the first time in its history the federal government had to assume responsibility for the economic condition of the country." Berle called for "dramatic new measures" which included "pumping more money into the economy through tax cuts; offering government guarantees of job security and of savings deposited in banks; creating a new federal agency that would regulate the stock market; developing a new system of federal old-age pensions and health and unemployment insurance; and relaxing the antitrust laws and the traditional restrictions on the size of banks in exchange for imposing greater regulation on them." He presented his ideas to Franklin D. Roosevelt. According to Lemann, it was Berle and his wife Beatrice who wrote the September 23, 1932 speech that President Franklin D. Roosevelt delivered at the Commonwealth Club in San Francisco—the "blueprint for the enormous change in the American political order, which the public hadn't yet started calling the New Deal." Roosevelt implemented the New Deal during the Great Depression, worst economic crisis in U.S. history. Through time, Berle's theories would be revised by John Maynard Keynes, whose 1936 publication The General Theory of Employment, Interest, and Money proposed a "new and more technical way for government to solve economic problems: by managing interest rates, the money supply, and the overall level of government spending." During World War II, Roosevelt instituted "Berle-style policies that would have been inconceivable during the 1930s. It was directly setting the prices of consumer goods and telling General Motors and U.S. Steel and the others exactly what to produce in their factories."

In 1952, John Kenneth Galbraith, one of Berle's protégés and " the leading champion of the liberal idea that the corporation, properly handled, could provide the economic foundation for a benign social order", published his book American Capitalism. During WWII Galbraith worked in Washington as an economist where in an administration that "directly intervened in the economic lives of big companies."

In 1960, Berle, speaking to a group of students, acknowledged dissenting voices. At the University of Chicago, the Austrian economist Friedrich Hayek was the key right-wing figure with a "passionate band of followers" who agreed with Hayek's "view that markets did a far better job than governments of responding to changing conditions." Hayek felt that the government's power should be limited to responding only to "perceived social needs". A government that did more than that "represented an unpardonable step in the direction of totalitarianism." Hayek's book, The Road to Serfdom sold millions of copies. The book warned that giving the government increasing economic control over the means of production would lead to totalitarian governments such as those of Nazi Germany, fascist Italy, and Joseph Stalin. Berle felt that Hayek's concerns were in response to the Nazis taking over Austria. Berle said there was no danger of totalitarianism in the United States. Berle then discussed the arguments from social critics on the left. They were preoccupied with the corporation and saw it as a "kind of disease to be overcome rather than an unstoppable force to be managed." David Riesman's 1950 influential publication The Lonely Crowd said that corporations had transformed the United States from a country of "independent individuals into one of company men for whom the need for approval was an 'insatiable force.' In his 1951 book White Collar, C. Wright Mills described the middle class as the "minion of management. You are the cog and the beltline of the bureaucratic machinery itself."

In his 1948 highly-influential textbook Economics which was written in the wake of the Great Depression and the Second World War, Paul Samuelson, popularized the work of John Maynard Keynes and was "highly skeptical of Berle-style planning" and Galbraith's theories. Lemann said that the Council of Economic Advisers—a "permanent office in the White House"—consisted mainly of academic economists focused on how "well markets functioned rather than how much power corporations".

In the introduction of his 1959 book, The Corporation in Modern Society—a "symposium of essays" by some authors, about the way in which large corporations have contributed to American life, the editor Edward Mason, said that, "Innovation at the hands of the small-scale inventor and individual entrepreneur has given way to organized research. The role of government in the economy continues to increase. The rugged individualist has been supplanted by smoothly efficient corporate executives who participate in group decision-making. The equity owner is joining the bond holder as a functionless rentier." The Corporation examined the role, responsibility, and selection of corporate managers and the degree of their power within their firm. They looked for similarities between the structures of government agencies and corporations, and they compared the role of corporations in the United States with that in Great Britain and the Soviet Union.

== Reviews and responses ==
The review by Sebastian Mallaby in The Atlantic said it was an "elegant history". Mallaby reviewed Lemann's Transaction Man alongside Binyamin Appelbaum's The Economists' Hour. He said that they both "contribute to the second wave of post-2008 commentary."

Business Insider included an excerpt of Transaction Man on September 10, 2019, in their series on "Better Capitalism: The key to future economic growth is about more than just increasing shareholder value", a series overseen by Richard Feloni that explores "ways companies and individuals are "creating sustainable long-term value", not just "chasing quarterly results". The title of the accompanying article by Lemann reads, "The 'Organization Man' of the mid-20th century gave way to the 'Transaction Man,' and the latter's rise explains the decline of the American Dream."

In his review in the Wall Street Journal, Barton Swain disagreed with Lemann's "central argument—that free-market theorists undermined the New Deal settlement and so unleashed chaos on the American economy." Swain said that Lemann did not credit the "high-tax, tightly regulated economy dominated by a few giant unionized corporations" with the "extraordinary advantages afforded to the American economy in the 1950s and 1960s" which contrasted sharply with economies in Western Europe, Japan, Eastern Europe, China, and India. According to Swain, Lemann over-stressed the influence of the American economist, Michael Jensen's 1976 paper, Theory of the Firm: Managerial Behavior, Agency Costs and Ownership Structure, which he co-authored with William H. Meckling. 'Theory of the Firm was one of the most widely cited economics papers of the last 40 years, it implied the theory of the public corporation as an ownerless entity, made up of only contractual relationships, a field pioneered by Ronald Coase.

Swain said that the period from 1981 to 2008—what Conservatives call the "Reagan Revolution"—came about because the post-WWII economic policies had become "untenable" by the 1970s. Swain called that economic approach a "distant dream" in 2019, appealing only to democratic socialists. Swain also faults Lemann for not neglecting to mention Federal National Mortgage Association (FNMA)—Fannie Mae and its brother institution Federal Home Loan Mortgage Corporation (FHLMC)—Freddie Mac and the damage inflicted by the government by "treating financial institutions as too big to fail."

== See also ==
- The Modern Corporation and Private Property (1931) by Adolf A. Berle
- The Lonely Crowd (1950) by David Riesman, Nathan Glazer, and Reuel Denney
- White Collar: The American Middle Classes (1951) by C. Wright Mills
- The Organization Man (1956) by William H. Whyte
- Bowling Alone (2000) by Robert D. Putnam.
