= Committees of correspondence (disambiguation) =

The committees of correspondence were bodies organized by the local governments of the American colonies in the late 1700s for the purposes of coordinating written communication outside of the colony.

Committees of correspondence may also refer to:

- Communist Correspondence Committee, a network founded by Karl Marx and Friedrich Engels in 1846 to coordinate and exchange ideas among socialist and communist groups across Europe;
- The Committee of Correspondence Newsletter, a publication concerned with nuclear disarmament during the 1960s, by David Riesman, Erich Fromm and other intellectuals;
- Green Committees of Correspondence, was the name of the U.S. Greens during the 1980s and a precursor to the Green Party of the United States;
- Committees of Correspondence for Democracy and Socialism, a democratic socialist group which originated in 1991 as a moderate, dissenting wing of the Communist Party USA;
- Committee of Correspondence (women's organization), a Cold War era internationalist group funded by the CIA.
