= Loneliness =

Unpleasant emotional response to social or physical isolation

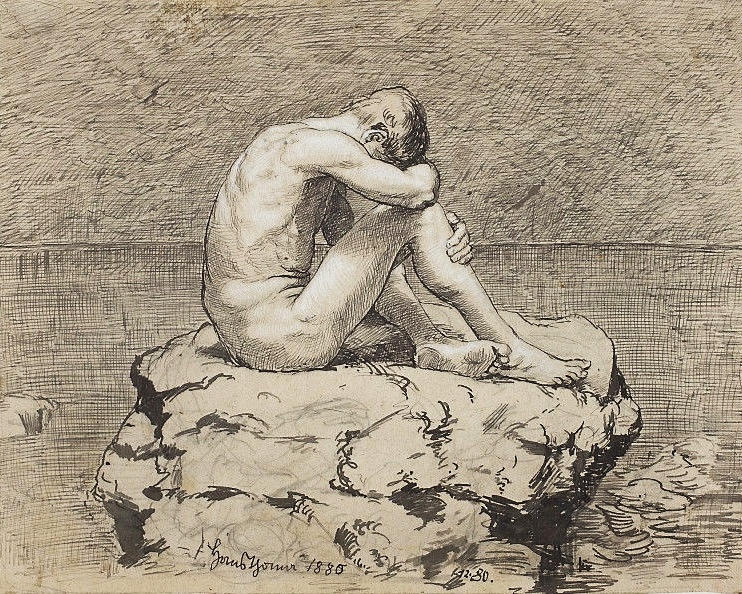
Loneliness by Hans Thoma (National Museum in Warsaw)

Loneliness is an unpleasant emotional response to perceived or actual social isolation. Loneliness has been described as social pain, a psychological mechanism that motivates individuals to seek social connections.

The causes of loneliness are varied. Loneliness can be a result of systemic issues, genetic inheritance, cultural factors, a lack of meaningful relationships, a significant loss, an excessive reliance on passive technologies (particularly the Internet in the 21st century), and a self-perpetuating mindset. Research has demonstrated that loneliness is ubiquitous in society, including among people in marriages along with other strong relationships and those with successful careers.

Most people suffer temporary loneliness at some points in their lives, with about one in six of the world's population experiencing significant long-term loneliness. Adolescents tend to experience the highest levels of loneliness; in later years it tends to decrease. This is in contrast with social isolation, which tends to increase with age, but on average older people grow less bothered by it at an even faster rate.

Transient or short-term loneliness is generally seen as a positive, adaptive response. While unpleasant, it motivates individuals to seek social connection, similar to how short-term hunger motivates one to eat. Chronic or long-term loneliness on the other hand, is generally correlated with negative effects. These include increased obesity, substance use disorder, risk of depression, cardiovascular disease, risk of high blood pressure, and high cholesterol.

Medical treatments for loneliness include beginning therapy and taking antidepressants. Social treatments for loneliness generally include an increase in interaction with others, such as group activities (such as exercise or religious activities), re-engaging with old friends or colleagues, owning pets, and becoming more connected with one's community.

Loneliness has long been a theme in literature, going back to the Epic of Gilgamesh. However, academic coverage of loneliness was sparse until recent decades. In the 21st century, some academics and professionals have claimed that loneliness has become an epidemic, including Vivek Murthy, a former Surgeon General of the United States.

== Causes ==
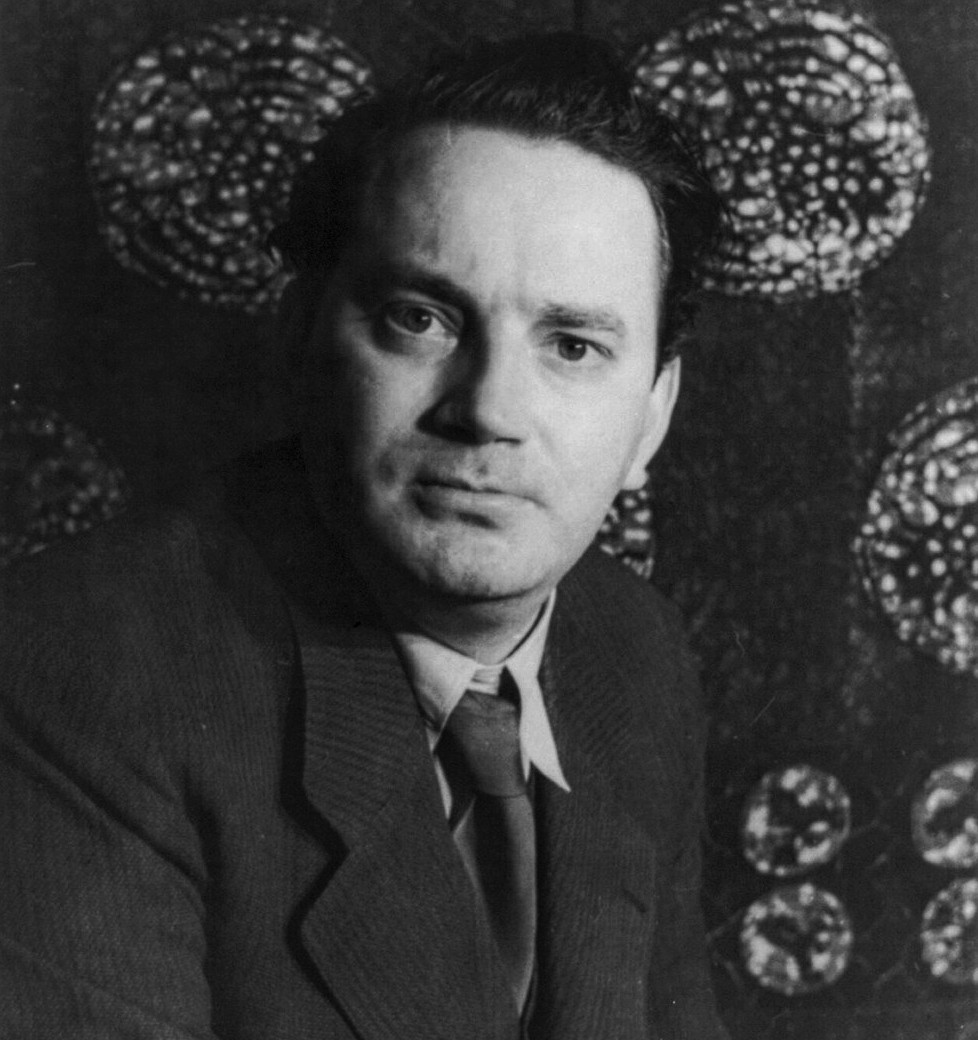
Thomas Wolfe who, in an often quoted passage, stated "The whole conviction of my life now rests upon the belief that loneliness, far from being a rare and curious phenomenon, is the central and inevitable fact of human existence."

=== Existential ===
Loneliness has long been viewed as a universal condition which, at least to a moderate extent, is felt by everyone. From this perspective, some degree of loneliness is inevitable as the limitations of human life mean it is impossible for anyone to continually satisfy their inherent need for connection. Professors including Michele A. Carter and Ben Lazare Mijuskovic have written books and essays tracking the existential perspective and the many writers who have talked about it throughout history. Thomas Wolfe's 1930s essay God's Lonely Man is frequently discussed in this regard; Wolfe makes the case that everyone imagines they are lonely in a special way unique to themselves, whereas really every single person sometimes experiences loneliness. While agreeing that loneliness alleviation can be a good thing, those who take the existential view tend to doubt such efforts can ever be fully successful, seeing some level of loneliness as both unavoidable and even beneficial, as it can help people appreciate the joy of living.

=== Cultural ===
Culture is discussed as a cause of loneliness in two senses. Migrants can experience loneliness due to missing their home culture. Studies have found this effect can be especially strong for students from countries in Asia with a collectivist culture, when they go to study at universities in more individualist English-speaking countries. Culture is also seen as a cause of loneliness in the sense that Western culture may have been contributing to loneliness, ever since the Enlightenment began to favour individualism over older communal values.

=== Lack of meaningful relationships ===
For many people, their family of origin did not offer the trust-building relationships needed to build a reference that lasts a lifetime, even in memory after the passing of a loved one. This can be due to parenting style, traditions, and mental health issues including personality disorders and abusive family environments. Sometimes religious shunning is also present. This impacts the ability of individuals to know themselves, to value themselves, and to relate to others (or to do so with great difficulty).

All these factors and many others are often overlooked by the standard medical or psychological advice that recommends to go meet friends or family and to socialise. This is not always possible when there is no one available to relate to and an inability to connect without the skills and knowledge on how to proceed. With time, a person might become discouraged or develop apathy from numerous trials, failures or rejections brought on by the lack of interpersonal skills.

=== Relationship loss ===
Loneliness is a very common, though often temporary, consequence of a relationship breakup or bereavement. The loss of a significant person in one's life will typically initiate a grief response; in this situation, one might feel lonely, even while in the company of others. Loneliness can occur due to the disruption to one's social circle, sometimes combined with homesickness, which results from people moving away for work or education.

=== Situational ===
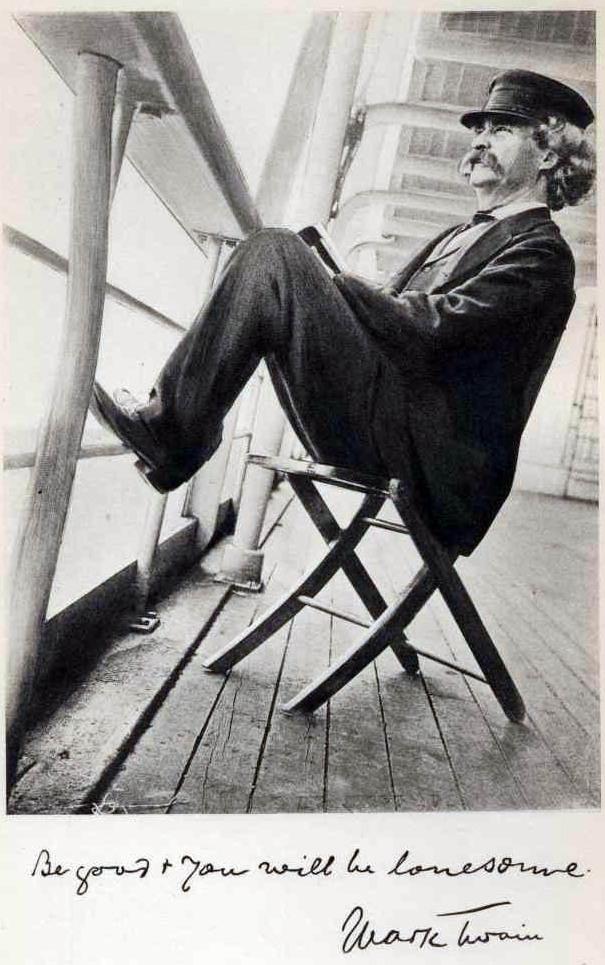
"Be good & you will be lonesome." wrote Mark Twain in Following the Equator (1897)

All sorts of situations and events can cause loneliness, especially in combination with certain personality traits for susceptible individuals. For example, an extroverted person who is highly social is more likely to feel lonely if they are living somewhere with a low population density, with fewer people for them to interact with. Loneliness can sometimes even be caused by events that might normally be expected to alleviate it: for example the birth of a child (if there is significant postpartum depression) or after getting married (especially if the marriage turns out to be unstable, overly disruptive to previous relationships, or emotionally cold). In addition to being impacted by external events, loneliness can be aggravated by pre-existing mental health conditions like chronic depression and anxiety.

=== Self-perpetuating ===
Long-term loneliness can cause various types of maladaptive social cognition, such as hypervigilance and social awkwardness, which can make it harder for an individual to maintain existing relationships or establish new ones. For instance, chronic loneliness can push people into a self-protective mode, leading them to perceive the world as less safe, meaningful, and worth exploring. Various studies have found that therapy targeted at addressing this maladaptive cognition is the single most effective way of intervening to reduce loneliness, though it does not always work for everyone.

=== Social contagion ===
Loneliness can spread through social groups like a disease. If a person loses a friend, this may increase their loneliness, resulting in development of maladaptive cognition such as excessive neediness or suspicion of other friends, possibly leading to a further loss of human connection among their remaining friends. Those other friends can become lonelier too, leading to a ripple effect of loneliness. Studies have however found that this contagion effect is not consistent – a small increase in loneliness does not always cause the maladaptive cognition. Also, when someone loses a friend, they will sometimes form new friendships or deepen other existing relationships.

=== Internet ===
Studies have tended to find a moderate correlation between extensive internet use and loneliness, especially ones that draw on data from the 1990s, before internet use became widespread. Contradictory results have been found by studies investigating whether the association is simply a result of lonely people being more attracted to the internet or if the internet can actually cause loneliness. The displacement hypothesis holds that some people choose to withdraw from real world social interactions so they can have more time for the internet. Excessive internet use can directly cause anxiety and depression, conditions which can contribute to loneliness – yet these factors may be offset by the internet's ability to facilitate interaction and to empower people. Some studies found that internet use is a cause of loneliness for some while others have found internet use can have a significant positive effect on reducing loneliness. The authors of meta-studies and reviews around 2015 and later have tended to argue that there is a bidirectional causal relationship between loneliness and internet use. Moderate use, especially by users who actively engage with others rather than passively consume content, can increase social connection and reduce loneliness.

=== Genetics ===
Smaller early studies had estimated that loneliness may be between 37–55% hereditable. However, in 2016, the first Genome-wide association study of loneliness found that the heredity of loneliness is much lower, at about 14–27%. This suggests that while genes play a role in determining how much loneliness a person may feel, they are less of a factor than individual experiences and the environment.

=== Ageing ===
Loneliness peaks in adolescence, while being less common in older adults.

== Typology ==
Two principal types of loneliness are social and emotional loneliness. This delineation was made in 1973 by Robert S. Weiss, in his seminal work: Loneliness: The Experience of Emotional and Social Isolation. Based on Weiss's view that "both types of loneliness have to be examined independently, because the satisfaction for the need of emotional loneliness cannot act as a counterbalance for social loneliness, and vice versa", people working to treat or better understand loneliness have tended to treat these two types of loneliness separately, though this is far from always the case.

=== Social loneliness ===
Social loneliness is the loneliness people experience because of the lack of a wider social network. They may not feel they are members of a community, or that they have friends or allies whom they can rely on in times of distress.

=== Emotional loneliness ===
Emotional loneliness results from the lack of deep, nurturing relationships with other people. Weiss tied his concept of emotional loneliness to attachment theory. People have a need for deep attachments, which can be fulfilled by close friends, though more often by close family members such as parents, and later in life by romantic partners. In 1997, Enrico DiTommaso and Barry Spinner separated emotional loneliness into Romantic and Family loneliness. A 2019 study found that emotional loneliness significantly increased the likelihood of death for older adults living alone (whereas there was no increase in mortality found with social loneliness).

==== Family loneliness ====
Family loneliness results when individuals feel they lack close ties with family members. A 2010 study of 1,009 students found that only family loneliness was associated with increased frequency of self-harm, not romantic or social loneliness.

==== Romantic loneliness ====
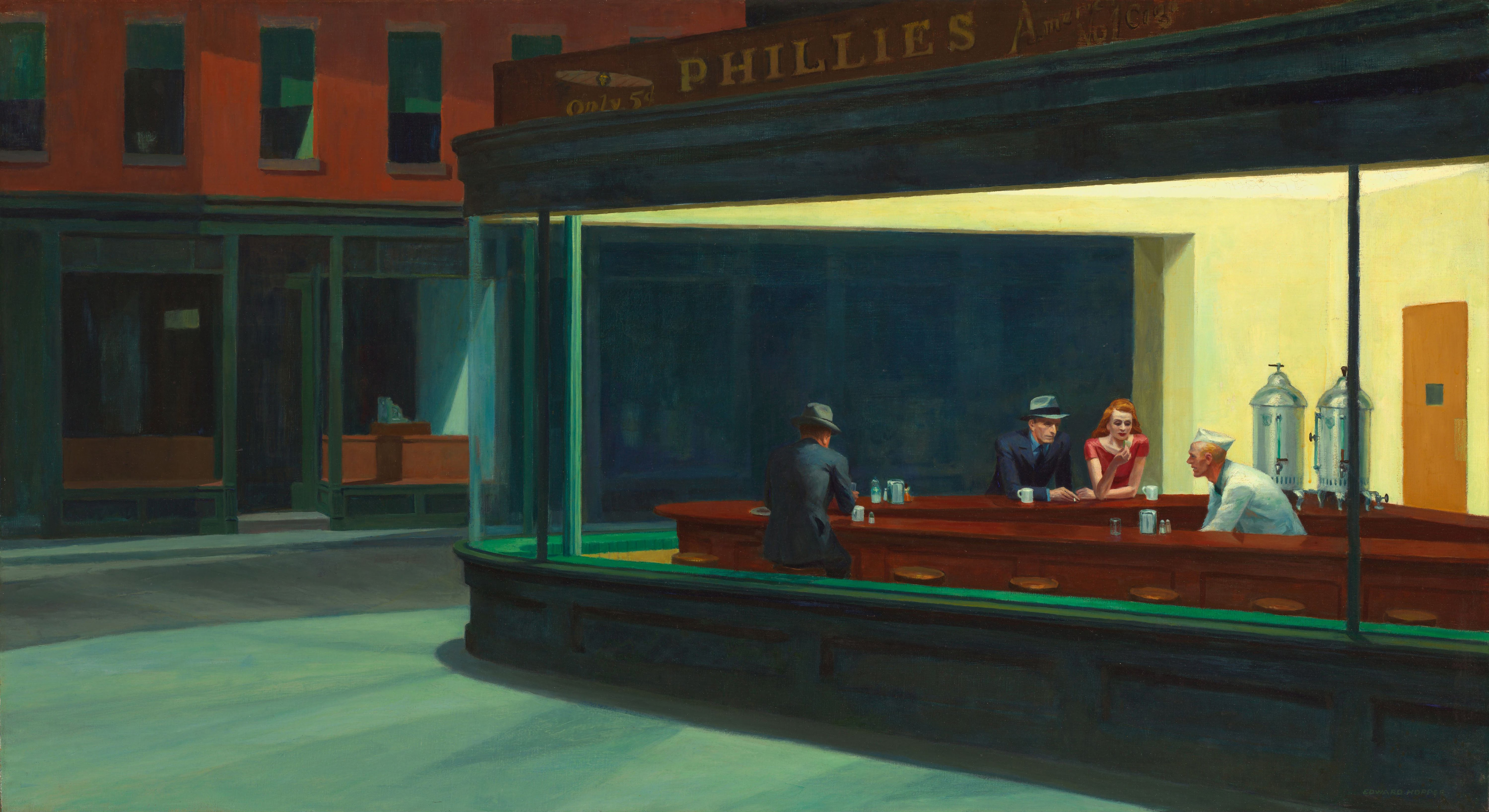
The 1942 painting Nighthawks by Edward Hopper, depicting a man watching a couple dining

Romantic loneliness can be experienced by adolescents and adults who lack a close bond with a romantic partner. Psychologists have asserted that the formation of a committed romantic relationship is a critical development task for young adults, but is also one that many are delaying into their late 20s or beyond. People in romantic relationships tend to report less loneliness than single people, provided their relationship provides them with emotional intimacy. People in unstable or emotionally cold romantic partnerships can still feel romantic loneliness.

=== Other ===
Several other typologies and types of loneliness exist. Further types of loneliness include existential loneliness, cosmic loneliness – feeling alone in a hostile universe, and cultural loneliness – typically found among immigrants who miss their home culture. These types are less well studied than the threefold separation into social, romantic and family loneliness, yet can be valuable in understanding the experience of certain subgroups with loneliness.

Lockdown loneliness refers to "loneliness resulting because of social disconnection due to enforced social distancing and lockdowns during the COVID-19 pandemic and similar emergency situations."

== Demarcation ==
=== Differences between feeling lonely and being socially isolated ===
There is a clear distinction between feeling lonely and being socially isolated (for example, a loner). In particular, one way of thinking about loneliness is as a discrepancy between one's necessary and achieved levels of social interaction, while solitude is simply the lack of contact with people. Loneliness is therefore a subjective yet multidimensional experience; if a person thinks they are lonely, then they are lonely. People can be lonely while in solitude or in the middle of a crowd; what makes a person lonely is their perceived need for more social interaction or a certain type or quality of social interaction that is not currently available. A person can be in the middle of a party and feel lonely due to not talking to enough people. Conversely, one can be alone and not feel lonely; even though there is no one around, that person is not lonely because there is no desire for social interaction. There have also been suggestions that each person has their own optimal level of social interaction. If a person gets too little or too much social interaction, this could lead to feelings of loneliness or over-stimulation.

Solitude can have positive effects on individuals. One study found that, although time spent alone tended to depress a person's mood and increase feelings of loneliness, it also helped to improve their cognitive state, such as improving concentration. It can be argued some individuals seek solitude for discovering a more meaningful and vital existence. Furthermore, once the alone time was over, people's moods tended to increase significantly. Solitude is also associated with other positive growth experiences, religious experiences, and identity building such as solitary quests used in rites of passages for adolescents.

=== Transient vs. chronic loneliness ===
Another important typology of loneliness focuses on the time perspective. In this respect, loneliness can be viewed as either transient or chronic. Transient loneliness is temporary in nature; generally it is easily relieved. Chronic loneliness is more permanent and not easily relieved. For example, when a person is sick and cannot socialize with friends, this would be a case of transient loneliness, as it would be easy for them to alleviate their loneliness once they got better. A person with long-term feelings of loneliness, regardless of whether they are with friends or at a family gathering, is experiencing chronic loneliness.

=== Loneliness as a human condition ===
The existentialist school of thought views individuality as the essence of being human. Each human being comes into the world alone, travels through life as a separate person, and ultimately dies alone. Coping with this, accepting it, and learning how to direct our own lives with some degree of grace and satisfaction is the human condition.

Some philosophers, such as Sartre, believe in an epistemic loneliness in which loneliness is a fundamental part of the human condition because of the paradox between people's consciousness desiring meaning in life and the isolation and nothingness of the universe. Conversely, other existentialist thinkers argue that human beings might be said to actively engage each other and the universe as they communicate and create, and loneliness is merely the feeling of being cut off from this process.

In his 2019 text, Evidence of Being: The Black Gay Cultural Renaissance and the Politics of Violence, Darius Bost draws from Heather Love's theorization of loneliness to delineate the ways in which loneliness structures black gay feeling and literary, cultural productions. Bost writes, "As a form of negative affect, loneliness shores up the alienation, isolation, and pathologization of black gay men during the 1980s and early 1990s. But loneliness is also a form of bodily desire, a yearning for an attachment to the social and for a future beyond the forces that create someone's alienation and isolation."

== Prevalence ==
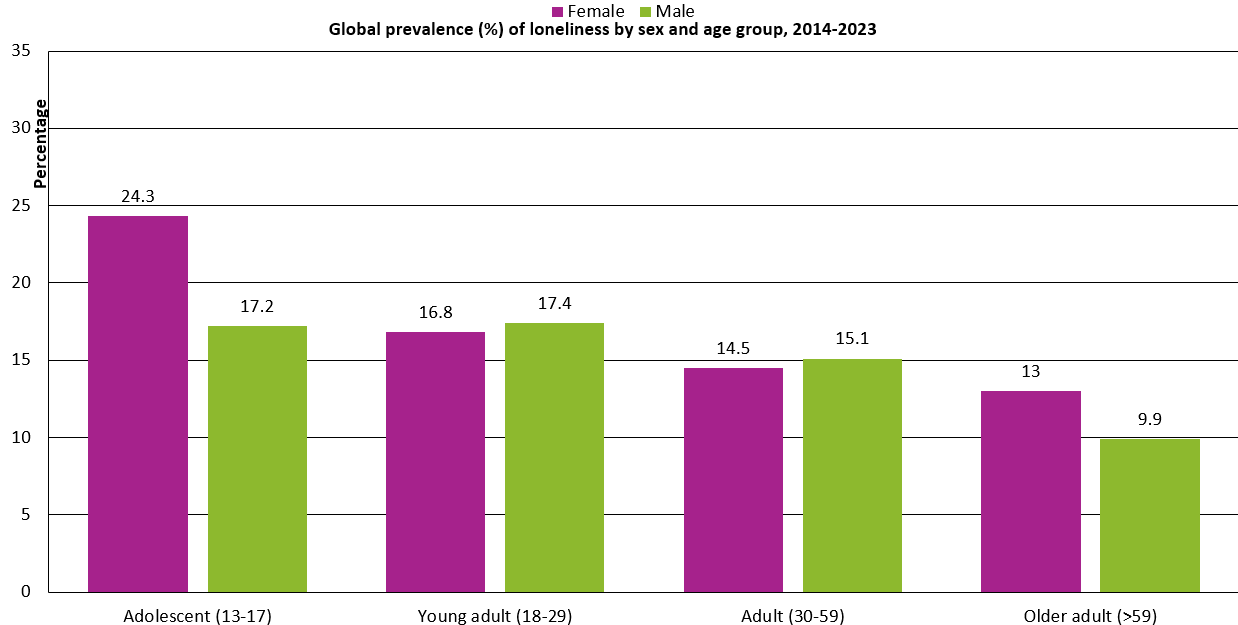
Global loneliness by age group and sex, based on 2014 - 2023 figures from the 2025 World Health Organization loneliness report.

The World Health Organization (WHO) found about one in six of the world's population experiences significant long term loneliness. In contrast with 20th century work that tended to see loneliness as a problem affecting the old, later work has found that adolescents are the age group experiencing the highest levels of loneliness; it then tends to decrease with age. Social isolation on the other hand tends to increase as people reach middle and old age, but while there are many exceptions, older people typically have less need of social connection so tend to feel less loneliness. Men and women are about equally affected by loneliness; but when broken down by age, women are more adversely affected both in adolescence and in old age, while for young and middle aged adults, men suffer from slightly more loneliness. LGBTIQ+ individuals and other minorities on average experience more loneliness than majority groups. In general, poorer countries and poorer individuals tend to suffer more loneliness than richer countries and people.

=== Increasing prevalence ===
In the 21st century, loneliness has been widely reported as an increasing worldwide problem. A 2010 systematic review and meta analyses had stated that the "modern way of life in industrialized countries" is greatly reducing the quality of social relationships, partly due to people no longer living in close proximity with their extended families. The review notes that from 1990 to 2010, the number of Americans reporting no close confidants has tripled.

In 2017, Vivek Murthy, the Surgeon General of the United States, argued that there was a loneliness epidemic. It has since been described as an epidemic thousands of times, by reporters, academics and other public officials.

Professors such as Claude S. Fischer and Eric Klinenberg opined in 2018 that while the data doesn't support describing loneliness as an "epidemic" or even as a clearly growing problem, loneliness is indeed a serious issue, having a severe health impact on millions of people. However, a 2021 study found that adolescent loneliness in contemporary schools and depression increased substantially and consistently worldwide after 2012.

A comparative overview of the prevalence and determinants of loneliness and social isolation in Europe in the pre-COVID period was conducted by Joint Research Centre of the European Commission within the project Loneliness in Europe. The empirical results indicate that 8.6% of the adult population in Europe experience frequent loneliness and 20.8% experience social isolation, with eastern Europe recording the highest prevalence of both phenomena.

In Australia, the annual national Household, Income and Labour Dynamics in Australia (HILDA) Survey has reported a steady 8% rise in agreement with the statement "I often feel very lonely" between 2009 and 2021, responses indicating "strongly agree" rose steadily by over 20% in that same time period. This is a reversal of the trend seen from the start of the survey in 2001 until 2009 where these figures had both been steadily decreasing.

Loneliness was exacerbated by the isolating effects of social distancing, stay-at-home orders, and deaths during the COVID-19 pandemic.

In May 2023, Murthy published a United States Department of Health and Human Services advisory on the impact of the epidemic of loneliness and isolation in the United States. The report likened the dangers of loneliness to other public health threats such as smoking and obesity. In November 2023, the World Health Organization declared loneliness a "global public health concern" and launched an international commission to study the problem. Published in 2025, while calling for urgent action to tackle the loneliness problem, the report concluded there was insufficient evidence to be sure if loneliness had indeed been increasing over time.

== Effects ==
=== Transient ===
While unpleasant, temporary feelings of loneliness are sometimes experienced by almost everyone and are not thought to cause long term harm. Early 20th century work sometimes treated loneliness as a wholly negative phenomenon, but transient loneliness is now generally considered beneficial. The capacity to feel it may have been evolutionarily selected for, a healthy aversive emotion that motivates individuals to strengthen social connections. Transient loneliness is sometimes compared to short-term hunger, which is unpleasant but ultimately useful as it motivates us to eat.

=== Chronic ===
Long-term loneliness is widely considered a close to entirely harmful condition. Whereas transient loneliness typically increases motivation to improve relationships with others, chronic loneliness can have the opposite effect. This is as long-term social isolation can cause hypervigilance. While enhanced vigilance may have been evolutionary adaptive for individuals who went long periods without others watching their backs, it can lead to excessive cynicism and suspicion of other people, which in turn can be detrimental to interpersonal relationships. So without intervention, chronic loneliness can be self-reinforcing.

==== Benefits ====
Some assert that even long-term involuntary loneliness can have beneficial effects.

Chronic loneliness is often seen as a purely negative phenomenon from the lens of social and medical science. Yet in spiritual and artistic traditions, it has been viewed as having mixed effects. Though even within these traditions, there can be warnings not to intentionally seek out chronic loneliness or other conditions – just advise that if one falls into them, there can be benefits. In western arts, there is a long belief that psychological hardship, including loneliness, can be a source of creativity. In spiritual traditions, perhaps the most obvious benefit of loneliness is that it can increase the desire for a union with the divine. More esoterically, the psychic wound opened up by loneliness or other conditions has been said, e.g. by Simone Weil, to open up space for God to manifest within the soul. In Christianity, spiritual dryness has been seen as advantageous as part of the "dark night of the soul", an ordeal that while painful, can result in spiritual transformation. From a secular perspective, while the vast majority of empirical studies focus on the negative effects of long term loneliness, a few studies have found there can also be benefits, such as enhanced perceptiveness of social situations.

==== Brain ====
Studies have found mostly negative effects from chronic loneliness on brain functioning and structure. However, certain parts of the brain and specific functions, like the ability to detect social threat, appear to be strengthened. A 2020 population-genetics study looked for signatures of loneliness in grey matter morphology, intrinsic functional coupling, and fiber tract microstructure. The loneliness-linked neurobiological profiles converged on a collection of brain regions known as the default mode network. This higher associative network shows more consistent loneliness associations in grey matter volume than other cortical brain networks. Lonely individuals display stronger functional communication in the default network, and greater microstructural integrity of its fornix pathway. The findings fit with the possibility that the up-regulation of these neural circuits supports mentalizing, reminiscence and imagination to fill the social void.

==== Physical health ====
Chronic loneliness can be a serious, life-threatening health condition. It has been found to be strongly associated with an increased risk of cardiovascular disease, though direct causal links have yet to be firmly identified. People experiencing loneliness tend to have an increased incidence of high blood pressure, high cholesterol, and obesity. Loneliness has been shown to increase the concentration of cortisol levels in the body and weaken the effects of dopamine. Prolonged, high cortisol levels can cause anxiety, depression, digestive problems, heart disease, sleep problems, and weight gain.

Associational studies on loneliness and the immune system have found mixed results, with lower natural killer (NK) cell activity or dampened antibody response to viruses such Epstein Barr, herpes, and influenza, but either slower or no change to the progression of AIDS. Based on the English Longitudinal Study of Ageing (ELSA), a study found that loneliness increased the risk of dementia by one-third. Not having a partner (being single, divorced, or widowed) doubled the risk of dementia. However, having two or three closer relationships reduced the risk by three-fifths. And based on the large UK Biobank cohort, a study found that individuals who reported feeling lonely had a higher risk of developing Parkinson's disease.

==== Death ====
A 2010 systematic review and meta-analysis found a significant association between loneliness and increased mortality. People with good social relationships were found to have a 50% greater chance of survival compared to lonely people (odds ratio = 1.5). In other words, chronic loneliness seems to be a risk factor for death comparable to smoking, and greater than obesity or lack of exercise. A 2017 overview of systematic reviews found other meta-studies with similar findings. However, clear causative links between loneliness and early death have not been firmly established.

==== Mental health ====
Loneliness has been linked with depression, and is thus a risk factor for suicide. A study based on more than 4,000 adults aged over 50 in the ELSA found that nearly one in five of those who reported being lonely had developed signs of depression within a year. Émile Durkheim has described loneliness, specifically the inability or unwillingness to live for others, i.e. for friendships or altruistic ideas, as the main reason for what he called egoistic suicide. In adults, loneliness is a major precipitant of depression and alcoholism. People who are socially isolated may report poor sleep quality, and thus have diminished restorative processes. Loneliness has also been linked with a schizoid character type in which one may see the world differently and experience social alienation, described as the self in exile. Loneliness has been linked to eating disorders.

While the long-term effects of extended periods of loneliness are little understood, it has been noted that people who are isolated or experience loneliness for a long period of time fall into a "ontological crisis" or "ontological insecurity," where they are not sure if they or their surroundings exist, and if they do, exactly who or what they are, creating torment, suffering, and despair to the point of palpability within the thoughts of the person.

In children, a lack of social connections is directly linked to several forms of antisocial and self-destructive behavior, most notably hostile and delinquent behavior. In both children and adults, loneliness often has a negative impact on learning and memory. Its disruption of sleep patterns can have a significant impact on the ability to function in everyday life.

Research from a large-scale study published in the journal Psychological Medicine, showed that "lonely millennials are more likely to have mental health problems, be out of work, and feel pessimistic about their ability to succeed in life than their peers who feel connected to others, regardless of gender or wealth".

In 2004, the United States Department of Justice published a study indicating that loneliness increases suicide rates profoundly among juveniles, with 62% of all suicides that occurred within juvenile facilities being among those who either were, at the time of the suicide, in solitary confinement or among those with a history of being housed thereof.

Pain, depression, and fatigue function as a symptom cluster and thus may share common risk factors. Two longitudinal studies with different populations demonstrated that loneliness was a risk factor for the development of that symptom cluster over time.

The psychiatrist George Vaillant and the director of longitudinal Study of Adult Development at Harvard University Robert J. Waldinger found that those who were happiest and healthier reported strong interpersonal relationships.

==== Suicide ====
Loneliness can cause suicidal thoughts, attempts at suicide, and actual suicide. The extent to which suicides result from loneliness are difficult to determine however, as there are typically several potential causes involved. In an article written for the American Foundation for Suicide Prevention, Dr. Jeremy Noble writes, "You don't have to be a doctor to recognize the connection between loneliness and suicide." As feelings of loneliness intensify, so do thoughts of suicide and attempts at suicide.

The Samaritans, a nonprofit charity in England which works with people going through crisis, says there is a definite correlation between feelings of loneliness and suicide for juveniles and those in their young adult years. The English Office of National Statistics found one of the top ten reasons young people have suicidal idealizations and attempt suicide is because they are lonely. College students who are lonely, away from home, living in new unfamiliar surroundings, or away from friends feel isolated and, without proper coping skills, will turn to suicide as a way to fix the pain of loneliness. A common theme, among children and young adults dealing with feelings of loneliness, is they didn't know help was available or where to get help. Loneliness, to them, is a source of shame.

In some countries, senior citizens appear to commit a high proportion of suicides, though in other countries the rate is significantly higher for middle-aged men. Retirement, poor health, loss of a significant other or other family or friends are all factors which contribute to loneliness. Suicides caused by loneliness in older people can be difficult to identify. Often they don't have anyone to disclose their feelings of loneliness and the despair it brings. They may stop eating, alter the doses of medications, or choose not to treat an illness as a way to help expedite death so they don't have to deal with feeling lonely.

Cultural influences can also cause loneliness leading to suicidal thoughts or actions. For example, Hispanic and Japanese cultures value interdependence. When a person from one of these cultures feels removed or feels like they can't sustain relationships in their families or society, they start to have negative behaviors, including negative thoughts or acting self-destructively. Other cultures, such as in Europe, are more independent.

==== Society level ====
High levels of chronic loneliness can also have society-wide effects. Economist Noreena Hertz writes that Hannah Arendt was the first to discuss the link between loneliness and the politics of intolerance. In her book, The Origins of Totalitarianism, Arendt argues that loneliness is an essential prerequisite for a totalitarian movement to gain power. Hertz states that the link between an individual's loneliness and their likelihood to vote for a populist political party or candidate has since been supported by several empirical studies. In addition to increasing support for populist policies, Hertz argues that a society with high levels of loneliness risks eroding its ability to have effective mutually beneficial politics. Some of the ways individuals alleviate loneliness, such as technological or transactional substitutes for human companionship, can reduce people's political and social skills, such as their ability to compromise and to see other points of view.

Studies investigating the relationship between loneliness and voter orientation directly found that lonely individuals can abstain from elections rather than support authoritarian parties. Other studies found romantic loneliness increased support for authoritarianism. This inconsistency might stem from differences in the definition and operationalization of loneliness.

== Physiological mechanisms linked to poor health ==
There are a number of potential physiological mechanisms linking loneliness to poor health outcomes. In 2005, results from the American Framingham Heart Study demonstrated that lonely men had raised levels of Interleukin 6 (IL-6), a blood chemical linked to heart disease. A 2006 study conducted by the Center for Cognitive and Social Neuroscience at the University of Chicago found loneliness can add thirty points to a blood pressure reading for adults over the age of 50. Another finding, from a survey conducted by John Cacioppo from the same university, is that doctors report providing better medical care to patients who have a strong network of family and friends than they do to patients who are alone. Cacioppo states that loneliness impairs cognition and willpower, alters DNA transcription in immune cells, and leads over time to high blood pressure. Lonelier people are more likely to show evidence of viral reactivation and have stronger inflammatory responses to acute stress compared to less lonely people; inflammation is a well-known risk factor for age-related diseases.

When someone feels left out of a situation, they feel excluded and one possible side effect is for their body temperature to decrease. When people feel excluded blood vessels at the periphery of the body may narrow, preserving core body heat. This class protective mechanism is known as vasoconstriction.

== Relief ==
The reduction of loneliness in oneself and others has long been a motive for human activity and social organization. For some commentators, such as professor Ben Lazare Mijuskovic, loneliness has been the single strongest motivator for human activity after essential physical needs are satisfied, ever since the dawn of civilization. Nevertheless, there is relatively little direct record of explicit loneliness relief efforts prior to the 20th century. Some commentators, including professor Rubin Gotesky, have argued the sense of aloneness was rarely felt until older communal ways of living began to be disrupted by the Enlightenment.

Starting in the 1900s, and especially in the 21st century, efforts explicitly aiming to alleviate loneliness became much more common. Loneliness reduction efforts occur across multiple disciplines, often by actors for whom loneliness relief is not their primary concern. For example, by commercial firms, civic planners, designers of new housing developments, and university administration. Across the world, many departments, NGOs and even umbrella groups entirely dedicated to loneliness relief have been established. For example, in the UK, the Campaign to End Loneliness. With loneliness being a complex condition, there is no single method that can consistently alleviate it for different individuals; many different approaches are used.

=== Medical treatment ===
Therapy is a common way of treating loneliness. For individuals whose loneliness is caused by factors that respond well to medical intervention, it is often successful. Short-term therapy, the most common form for lonely or depressed patients, typically occurs over a period of ten to twenty weeks. During therapy, emphasis is put on understanding the cause of the problem, reversing the negative thoughts, feelings, and attitudes resulting from the problem, and exploring ways to help the patient feel connected. Some doctors also recommend group therapy as a means to connect with other patients and establish a support system. Doctors also frequently prescribe anti-depressants to patients as a stand-alone treatment, or in conjunction with therapy. It may take several attempts before a suitable anti-depressant medication is found.

Doctors often see a high proportion of patients with loneliness; a UK survey found that three-quarters of doctors believed that between 1–5 patients visited them each day mainly out of loneliness. There isn't always sufficient funds to pay for therapy, leading to the rise of "social prescription", where doctors can refer patients to NGO and community-led solutions such as group activities. While preliminary findings suggest social prescription has good results for some people, early evidence to support its effectiveness was not strong, with commentators advising that for some people it is not a good alternative to medical therapy. As of 2024, formal social prescribing programmes have been launched in 17 different countries around the world, with improved evidence for its effectiveness when the prescriptions are carefully targeted, such as helping the lonely person get closer to nature, or participate in group activities they enjoy.

=== NGO and community led ===
Along with growing awareness of the problem of loneliness, community-led projects explicitly aiming for its relief became more common in the latter half of the 20th century, with still more starting up in the 21st. There have been many thousands of such projects across North and South America, Europe, Asia, and Africa. Some campaigns are run nationally, under the control of charities dedicated to loneliness relief, while other efforts may be local projects, sometimes run by a group for which loneliness relief is not their primary objective. For example, housing associations that aim to ensure multi generational living, with social interaction between younger and older people encouraged, in some cases even contractually required. Projects range from befriending schemes that facilitate just two people meeting up, to large group activities, which will often have other objectives in addition to loneliness relief: as having fun, improving physical health with exercise, or participating in conservation efforts. For example, in New Zealand the NGO Age Concern began an Accredited Visiting Service which was found to be an effective counter to this loneliness and isolation.

=== Government ===
In 2010, François Fillon announced the fight against loneliness would be France's great national cause for 2011. In the UK, the Jo Cox Commission on Loneliness began pushing to make tackling loneliness a government priority from 2016. In 2018, this led to Great Britain becoming the first country in the world to appoint a ministerial lead for loneliness, and to publish an official loneliness reduction strategy. There have since been calls for other countries to appoint their own minister for loneliness, for example in Sweden and Germany. Various other countries had seen government led anti loneliness efforts even before 2018 however. For example, in 2017 the government of Singapore started a scheme to provide allotments to its citizens so they could socialise while working together on them, while the Netherlands government set up a telephone line for lonely older people. While governments sometimes directly control loneliness relief efforts, they can work in partnership with educational institutions and organisations. Social policy can reduce loneliness across all age groups by reducing the barriers for formation of new friendships.

=== Pets ===
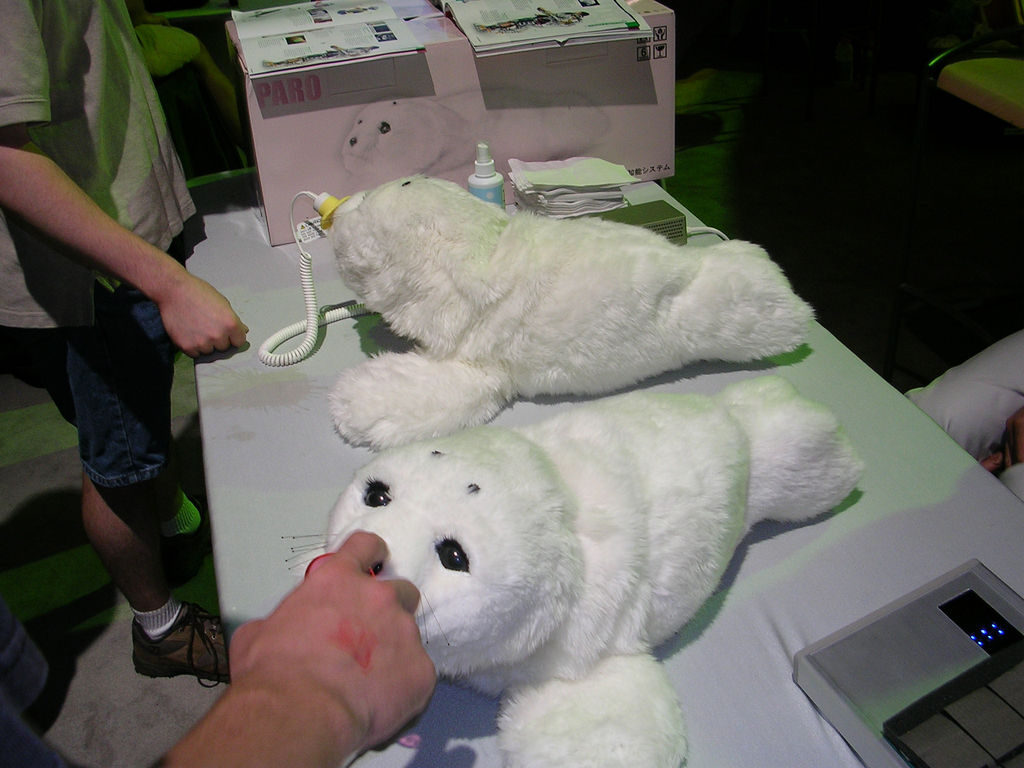
Paro, a robot pet seal classified as a medical device by U.S. regulators

Pet therapy, or animal-assisted therapy, can be used to treat both loneliness and depression. The presence of animal companions, especially dogs, but also others like cats, rabbits, and guinea pigs, can ease feelings of depression and loneliness among some patients. Beyond the companionship the animal itself provides there may also be increased opportunities for socializing with other pet owners. According to the Centers for Disease Control and Prevention there are a number of other health benefits associated with pet ownership, including lowered blood pressure and decreased levels of cholesterol and triglycerides.

=== Technology ===
Technology companies have been advertising their products as helpful for reducing loneliness at least as far back as 1905; records exist of early telephones being presented as a way for isolated farmers to reduce loneliness. Technological solutions for loneliness have been suggested much more frequently since the development of the internet, and especially since loneliness became a more prominent public health issue at around 2017. Solutions have been proposed by existing tech companies, and by start-ups dedicated to loneliness reduction.

Solutions that have become available since 2017 tend to fall under 4 different approaches.

1. Mindfulness apps aim to change an individual's attitude towards loneliness, emphasising possible benefits, and trying to shift towards an experience more similar to voluntary solitude.
2. Apps that warn users when they're starting to spend too much time online, which is based on research findings that moderate use of digital technology can be beneficial, but that excessive time online can increase loneliness.
3. Apps that help people connect with others, including to arrange real life meetups.
4. AI-related technologies that provide digital companionship.

==== Effectiveness of digital technology interventions ====
A 2021 systematic review and meta-analysis on the effectiveness of legacy digital technology interventions (DTIs) for mitigating loneliness in older adults found no evidence supporting that DTIs reduced loneliness. For AI companions on the other hand, studies have tended to find they can be effective in reducing loneliness for post-retirement adults. Evidence on the effectiveness of AI companions for younger people is more mixed, with available studies suggesting they can have minimal or even negative long-term effects in reducing loneliness, especially where emotional loneliness is concerned, and especially for individuals where the AI companion is the sole intervention, rather than being complemented with other more human-orientated forms of intervention.

=== Religion ===
Studies have found an association with religion and the reduction of loneliness, especially among the elderly. The studies sometimes include caveats, such as that religions with strong behavioural prescriptions can have isolating effects. In the 21st century, numerous religious organisations have begun to undertake efforts explicitly focusing on loneliness reduction. Religious figures have also played a role in raising awareness of the problem of loneliness; for example, Pope Francis said in 2013 that loneliness of the old (along with youth unemployment) were the most serious evils of the age.

=== Others ===
Nostalgia has also been found to have a restorative effect, counteracting loneliness by increasing perceived social support. Similar media-based practices such as Comfort television involve engaging with familiar content to provide emotional comfort and alleviate feelings of loneliness. Vivek Murthy has stated that the most generally available cure for loneliness is human connection. Murthy argues that regular people have a vital role to play as individuals in reducing loneliness for themselves and others, in part by greater emphases on kindness and on nurturing relationships with others.

=== Effectiveness ===
Professor Stella Mills has suggested that, while social loneliness can be relatively easy to address with group activities and other measures that help build connections between people, effective intervention against emotional loneliness can be more challenging. Mills argues that such intervention is more likely to succeed for individuals who are in the early stages of loneliness, before the effects caused by chronic loneliness are deeply engrained.

A 2010 meta-study compared the effectiveness of four interventions: improving social skills, enhancing social support, increasing opportunities for social interaction, and addressing faulty patterns of thoughts (such as the hyper-vigilance). The results of the study indicated that all interventions were effective in reducing loneliness, possibly with the exception of social skill training. Results of the meta-analysis suggest that correcting the faulty patterns of thoughts offers the best chance of reducing loneliness. A 2019 umbrella review of systematic reviews on the effectiveness of loneliness relief efforts aimed at older people also found that it was the most effective method.

A 2018 overview of systematic reviews concerning the effectiveness of loneliness interventions found that, generally, there is little solid evidence that intervention are effective. However, they also found no reason to believe the various types of intervention did any harm, except they cautioned against the excessive use of digital technology. The authors called for more rigorous, best practice–compliant research in future studies, and for more attention to the cost of interventions. A 2025 report from the WHO, while remaining cautious, was more optimistic about the prospects for effective interventions, devoting its last five chapters to ways this could be achieved by supernational bodies, national and local government, along with NGOs and other civil society actors.

== Historical emergence of loneliness as a social problem ==
Loneliness has been a theme in literature throughout the ages, as far back as Epic of Gilgamesh. Yet according to Fay Bound Alberti, it was only around the year 1800 that the word began to widely denote a negative condition. With some exceptions, earlier writings and dictionary definitions of loneliness tended to equate it with solitude – a state that was often seen as positive, unless taken to excess.

From about 1800, the word loneliness began to acquire its modern definition as a painful subjective condition. This may be due to the economic and social changes arising out of the enlightenment. Such as alienation and increased interpersonal competition, along with a reduction in the proportion of people enjoying close and enduring connections with others living in close proximity, may have been the case for modernising pastoral villages. Despite growing awareness of the problem of loneliness, widespread social recognition of the problem remained limited, and scientific study was sparse, until the last quarter of the twentieth century. One of the earliest studies of loneliness was published by Joseph Harold Sheldon in 1948. The 1950 book The Lonely Crowd helped further raise the profile of loneliness among academics. For the general public, awareness was raised by the 1966 Beatles song "Eleanor Rigby".

According to Eugene Garfield, it was Robert S. Weiss who brought the attention of scientists to the topic of loneliness, with his 1973 publication of Loneliness: The experience of emotional and social isolation. Before Weiss's publication, what few studies of loneliness existed were mostly focussed on older adults. Following Weis's work, and especially after the 1978 publication of the UCLA Loneliness Scale, scientific interest in the topic has broadened and deepened considerably, with tens of thousands of academic studies having been carried to investigate loneliness just among students, with many more focussed on other subgroups, and on whole populations.

Concern among the general public over loneliness increased in the decades since "Eleanor Rigby"'s release; by 2018, government-backed anti-loneliness campaigns had been launched in countries including the UK, Denmark and Australia. A 2025 report by the WHO called for further urgent global action to address loneliness, arguing this would prevent deaths, improve wellbeing, educational and economic outcomes, and build healthier, more resilient, more prosperous societies.

== See also ==
- Solitude
- Shyness
- Social anxiety
- Social anxiety disorder
- Social isolation
- Autophobia
- Incel
- Individualism
- Interpersonal relationship
- Loner
- Pit of despair (animal experiments on isolation)
- Schizoid personality disorder
- Touch starvation
