= Reuel Denney =

American poet (1913–1995)

Reuel Denney

Reuel Denney (April 13, 1913 in New York City – May 1, 1995 in Honolulu) was an American poet and academic.

== Life ==
Denney grew up in Buffalo, New York. He graduated from Dartmouth College in 1932. He taught at the University of Chicago. He was professor emeritus, at University of Hawaii, retiring in 1977.

He received the Quantrell Award.

His papers are at the Rauner Special Collections Library at Dartmouth College.

== Awards ==
- 1939 Yale Series of Younger Poets Competition

== Works ==
- The Connecticut River, and other poems, Yale University Press, (1939), (reprint 1971), winner of the Yale Younger Series Award.
- The Lonely Crowd, Reuel Denney, David Riesman, Nathan Glazer, (1950), (reprint 2001), a classic of American sociology.
- "Reactors of the Imagination". Bulletin of the Atomic Scientists. July 1953. ISSN 0096-3402.
- Conrad Aiken. University of Minnesota Press. 1964. ISBN 978-0-7837-2891-9.
- In Praise of Adam (1965)
- The Astonished Muse. Transaction Publishers. 1988. ISBN 978-0-88738-762-3. (reprint)
- Tony Quagliano, ed. (1999). Feast of strangers: selected prose and poetry of Reuel Denney. Greenwood Press. ISBN 978-0-313-30085-1.

=== Anthologies ===
- William Harmon, ed. (1979). The Oxford book of American light verse. Oxford University Press. ISBN 978-0-19-502509-5.
- A new anthology of modern poetry, Selden Rodman (ed), The Modern Library, 1946
