= UCLA Loneliness Scale =

Commonly used measure of loneliness

The UCLA Loneliness Scale is a commonly used measure of loneliness. It was originally released in 1978 as a 20-item scale. It has since been revised several times, and shorter versions have been introduced for situations where 20 questions is too much, such as telephone surveys.

== Example survey items ==
The exact wording of the items, and the way a respondent is asked to rate them, can vary depending on which version is in use. The example below shows three items from the 1980 revision (R-UCLA), where respondents were asked to rate each item from one of four choices: 'never', 'rarely', 'sometimes' or 'often'.

Item	Never	Rarely	Sometimes	Often
I lack companionship.	1	2	3	4
No one really knows me well.	1	2	3	4
I am an outgoing person.*	4	3	2	1

Once the answers are completed, the numbers associated with each rating are totaled up to give the individual's loneliness score. It's considered bad design to make all the items negative statements, so some are phrased as a positive (marked with '*' in the example above.) For a positive item, the score is reversed. For example, if a respondent answers 'Often' to "I am an outgoing person", then rather than the 4 that would normally be assigned for answering 'Often', it scores as a 1.

== History ==
Very little scientific study had been conducted on loneliness until the second half of the 20th century. Dozens of early studies were carried out in the 1960s, but wider acceptance of their results were hampered in part by limitations of the early scales used to measure how lonely people felt. Some of these early scales were not even internally consistent. The UCLA scale was developed to address these limitations by researchers at University of California, Los Angeles (UCLA). These researchers included M.L. Ferguson, Daniel Russell and Letitia Anne Peplau. The original version was published in 1978 as a 20-item scale. Initial evaluation of the scale found high levels of internal consistency and good scores on other measures of validity. The UCLA Loneliness Scale was the first loneliness scale to achieve widespread acceptance among scientists. It has since been revised several times, including in 1980 and 1996. Shorter versions have been released for use in cases where asking 20 questions would be too much, such as for short telephone interviews suitable to be undertaken for large numbers of people. For example, ULS-8, an 8 item version.

== Prevalence ==
The scale is widely used in studies and surveys on loneliness. A 1992 study estimated the UCLA Loneliness Scale had been used in an estimated 80% of all empirical studies on loneliness. A 2001 metastudy looking at 149 studies of loneliness, found that the UCLA scale was used in 27% of the studies; this was far more than for any other formal scale.

As of 2018, the UCLA scale remained the most commonly used unidimensional loneliness scale across the world. In some areas though, such as continental Europe, multi-dimensional scales like De Jong Gierveld's are now more widely used.

== Assessment ==
Especially compared to earlier (pre-1978) scales, the UCLA scale scored highly in various tests of its validity, such as internal consistency. Developer Daniel Russell had however expressed concern that publication of the scale could skew responses.

The scale has been criticized for being unidimensional. A common view among researchers and practitioners in the loneliness relief field, is that in order to properly understand and address loneliness, it is necessary to break it down to component parts, at least to the top level division into social & emotional loneliness. For this reason, some researchers prefer multidimensional scales which gives results for different types of loneliness, such as the De Jong Gierveld scale, which reports separately on social and emotional loneliness, or SELSA, which reports on social, romantic, and family loneliness.
