= The Committee of Correspondence Newsletter =

Newsletter

The Committee of Correspondence Newsletter, later known as The Correspondent, was a publication of the eponymous Committee of Correspondence at Harvard University (with no official connection to the university) from 1961 through 1965. It carried articles and opinion on foreign and defense policy of the U.S. by critics and academics sympathetic to the peace movement.

The publication provided a forum for dissent concerning the major issues of the period, particularly the civil defense - thermonuclear war fright and various cold war events, the cybernation issue in its early phases, and the growing focus on a war in Vietnam with the transition from the Kennedy to the Johnson administrations. Editorially it sought to be critical of dominant foreign and defense policy in the mold of its editorial board, while the principal editor, Roger Hagan, considered independent journalist I. F. Stone his role model.

== History ==
In early 1960, toward the end of the Eisenhower Republican administration, some American intellectuals, mostly academics or social service professionals, alarmed by the growing danger of nuclear war, began meeting to seek a solution and promote nuclear disarmament. It had become evident that America had no monopoly on nuclear bombs. Academy-based intellectuals had had little contact with policy makers and military officials in the Eisenhower years, and anyone proposing nuclear disarmament to that point had been accused of being Soviet agents or dupes. It was nearly impossible to get discussion of disarmament into America's consciousness, and the United States was so panicked about Soviet expansionism that all its policy responses to events in Europe, and of course Cuba, were belligerent.

Disarmament was of course actively discussed in pacifist circles, such as the American Friends Service Committee. Stewart Meacham, the Peace Education Secretary for the national AFSC, wanted to involve leading academics not previously identified with pacifism. He kept in touch with Professor David Riesman at Harvard, author of the much-admired 1949 book on American social character, A Lonely Crowd, and was stimulated by a paper Riesman sent written by one of his graduate student assistants named Roger Hagan, entitled “Memo To A Third Party.” To discuss the possibility that it might be necessary to start a new political party to avert nuclear war, Meacham invited Hagan, Riesman, and about forty persons he considered influential or useful to a conference in the West Texas hills at a Friends country retreat.

The meeting did not endorse such a step. However, Meacham and his most active regional AFSC Peace Education Secretaries, especially Robert Gilmore of New York City and Russell Johnson of Cambridge, Massachusetts, realized that even by gathering a few dozen prominent academics and writers, and bringing into the group leading non-communist pacifist thinkers like Rev. A. J. Muste, they were moving the discussion of nuclear disarmament farther into the national mainstream than it had ever been. So Meacham and Robert Gilmore called another meeting for March 1960, at the Bear Mountain Lodge above the Hudson River near West Point.

=== Bear Mountain meeting ===
The outcome of the Bear Mountain meeting was that a few conferees committed to produce a publication which would work to expand the discussion circle about defense policy. The group took the name Committee of Correspondence as a reference to a similar effort in the 1770s, before the American Revolution. The publication was called The Committee of Correspondence Newsletter, and it was published monthly, and later bimonthly and finally quarterly, from January 1961 through Autumn 1965, and carried articles, letters and responses from a growing circle of academics, journalists and young activists whose names would be better known in later decades.

In time the “Committee” became the “Council” because of objections from a woman's social organization that claimed prior use of the name, and the Newsletter was ultimately renamed The Correspondent, in innocent ignorance of the use of that term in divorce cases. Ironically, the women's group was worried about becoming linked to controversy, but elsewhere in Wikipedia one learns that, in later decades, the name Committee of Correspondence was adopted by dissident Communists. Presumably the women's organization had retired from the fray by then.

=== Editors ===
The first editor of the Newsletter was Nathan Glazer, then of New York City, who had been credited as co-author of The Lonely Crowd (with Riesman and Reuel Denney), and was thus an old friend of Riesman's. But after two issues Glazer pleaded lack of time, and Roger Hagan in Cambridge agreed to take over. Hagan edited the publication from April 1961 until the end of 1964, and wrote many articles for it as well as for other publications. After Hagan left The Correspondent at the end of 1964 to work for a broadcasting company in Seattle, The Correspondent was edited by former assistant editor Nancy R. Evans, aided by Barry Phillips, Nancy Edelman Phillips, Michael Brower, Richard Hathaway, and Marilyn Young.

=== Funding ===
While the readers of the newsletter contributed money to pay its expenses, it became necessary to seek more funds. Fromm made contributions to help cover expenses, and two other donors were found who gave more, one a friend of Martin Peretz, then an instructor on the Harvard political science faculty, subsequently publisher of The New Republic. Hagan, Peretz, Robert Paul Wolff, Gabriel and Joyce Kolko, Michael Walzer, Michael Maccoby, Chester Hartman and later Todd Gitlin, were all members of a political discussion group in the Harvard - Brandeis neighborhood which met and argued fitfully in those years, coalesced at times to aid a campaign such as that of Prof. H. Stuart Hughes in his run for Senate, and fell apart again, morphing later into a wing of the Students for a Democratic Society (SDS) with a new crop of recruits.

The other angel was Stimson Bullitt of Seattle. The Seattle connection came about because David Riesman had agreed, contrary to his general rule, to write an introduction for a book edited by a friend at Doubleday, Adam Yarmolinsky, because he found it unique and charming, although he had never met the author. The book was To Be a Politician by Bullitt, about his unsuccessful run for Congress in Seattle. When Bullitt, by then president of his family's television company, would come to Cambridge, Riesman, if unavailable, would ask Hagan to meet with him. This happenstance would not only lead to a new lease on life for The Correspondent but would ultimately provide Hagan with the opportunity to move into television documentary production. While this satisfied his ambitions at the time, he would later look back on The Correspondent and its small but influential readership, as described below, as his peak opportunity to positively affect American life.

=== Editorial board ===
The editorial board of The Committee of Correspondence Newsletter - The Correspondent shifted gradually over five years of its life but always included as active participants sociologist David Riesman, psychoanalyst Erich Fromm, and Rev. A. J. Muste, and contributing editors law professor David Cavers, economist Kenneth Boulding, physicist David Inglis, sociologist Seymour Martin Lipset, historian H. Stuart Hughes, Marcus Raskin, Director of the Washington think tank Institute for Policy Studies, and Stewart Meacham and Robert Gilmore of the American Friends Service Committee and SANE (Committee for a Sane Nuclear Policy). Branch Committees of Correspondence coalesced in periods of national crisis in Berkeley, Champaign-Urbana, Chicago and New York City. Cambridge meetings were rare but drew Brandeis and Boston University professors, including Herbert Marcuse, an old colleague/antagonist of Erich Fromm's from the thirties years at the Frankfurt Institute for Social Research.

Riesman's politics were hard to pin down, but who was characterized by Arthur Schlesinger Jr. as primarily a counter-cyclical thinker. Fromm was a neo-Freudian psychoanalyst based in New York City and Mexico who occupied an ideological position few Americans yet understood, a non-communist Marxist.

=== Content ===
As to content, all the emergent issues of defense, foreign policy, and even domestic issues of civil rights, civil liberties and economic change were dealt with. The pacifist tone of the earliest meetings was soon submerged in the realpolitik of contemporary liberalism. But the thrust remained strongly favoring initiatives toward disarmament and defusing the hot issue bombs that were scattered in the fields of foreign policy and domestic policy. The period covered the last gasp of Republican foreign policy (i.e. John Foster Dulles), the entire Kennedy presidency with its Central Intelligence Agency invasion of Cuba, its Berlin crisis, its battles over a test ban treaty with Russia, the resumption of atmospheric testing of nuclear bombs, the Cuban Missile Crisis and showdown with Khrushchev, the Kennedy assassination and the beginning of the Lyndon Johnson presidency, and the growing involvement in Vietnam, as well as the civil rights battles leading to the Civil Rights Act of 1964.

In the period after 1961, many critics and friends of the Newsletter and of Committee members went to Washington D.C. to take up official duties. So the Newsletter began to be read by policy makers and apparatchiks — some wrote for it — and those who wrote for the Newsletter felt that they had an important audience of policy makers and their friends and colleagues, even as the writers “flew under the radar” of mass media scrutiny. However, some of the committee's active authors were also attached to SANE, which ran full-page ads in The New York Times. Peak circulation of The Correspondent was about five thousand subscribers, but these were sufficiently effective in national affairs that LIFE magazine, still a Henry Luce product, roused itself to editorialize against it. Nonetheless, the Committee of Correspondence managed never to be attacked as a pro-Soviet group. Its writers and board of editors were too prominent and recognized for such a charge to be credible.

=== Special issues ===
The newsletter published two issues dedicated to United States policy toward Cuba: one in May 1961 and the other in January 1962.
