= Nicholas Lemann =

American writer and academic

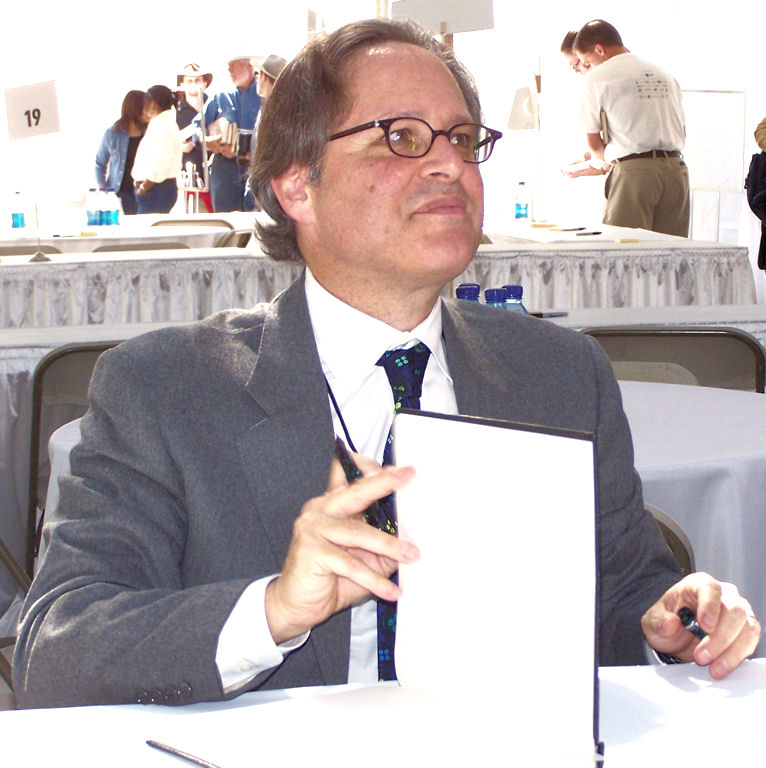
- Lemann at the 2006 Texas Book Festival
- Born: Nicholas Berthelot Lemann
- Education: Metairie Park Country Day School
- Alma mater: Harvard University (BA)
- Occupation: Academic

Nicholas Berthelot Lemann is an American writer and academic, and is the Joseph Pulitzer II and Edith Pulitzer Moore Professor of Journalism and Dean Emeritus of the Faculty of Journalism at the Columbia University Graduate School of Journalism. He has been a staff writer at The New Yorker since 1999. Lemann was elected to the American Philosophical Society in 2022.

== Early life and education ==
External videos
- "Nicholas Lemann: Growing Up Jewish in the American South", Big Think

Nicholas Lemann was born, raised, and educated in a Jewish family in New Orleans. He describes his family's faith as a "kind of super-Reform Judaism" where there were "no kosher laws, no bar mitzvahs, no tallit, no kippot".

He was educated at Metairie Park Country Day School, a private school in New Orleans, from which he graduated in 1972, followed by Harvard University, where he studied American history and literature, and was president of The Harvard Crimson, where he wrote the Brass Tacks column, and from which he graduated magna cum laude in 1976.

== Life and career ==
Lemann began his journalism career as a 17-year-old writer for an alternative weekly, the Vieux Carre Courier, in his home city of New Orleans. After graduation, he worked at the Washington Monthly, as an associate editor and then managing editor; at Texas Monthly, as an associate editor and then executive editor; at The Washington Post, as a member of the national staff; at The Atlantic Monthly, as national correspondent; and at The New Yorker, as staff writer and then Washington correspondent.

Lemann won the 1980 Raymond Clapper Memorial Award "...for a series of stories outlining the plight of a family on welfare."

On September 1, 2003, Lemann became dean of the Graduate School of Journalism at Columbia University. During Lemann's time as dean, the Journalism School launched and completed its first capital fundraising campaign, added 20 members to its full-time faculty, built a student center, started its first new professional degree program since the 1930s, and launched initiatives in investigative reporting, digital journalism, executive leadership for news organizations, and other areas. He stepped down as dean in 2013, following two five-year terms.

In 2015, Lemann launched Columbia Global Reports, a university-funded publishing imprint that produces four to six ambitious works of journalism and analysis a year, each on a different underreported story in the world. From 2017 to early 2021, he was the director of Columbia World Projects.

Lemann is the author or editor of several books, including Returning: A Search for Home Across Three Centuries (2026), Transaction Man: The Rise of the Deal and the Decline of the American Dream (2019), Redemption: The Last Battle of the Civil War (2006); The Big Test: The Secret History of the American Meritocracy (1999); and The Promised Land: The Great Black Migration and How It Changed America (1991), which won several book prizes. He has written widely for such publications as The New York Times, The New York Review of Books, The New Republic, and Slate; worked in documentary television with Blackside, Inc., Frontline, the Discovery Channel, and the BBC; and lectured at many universities.

Lemann serves on the boards of directors of the Authors Guild, the National Academy of Sciences' Division of Behavioral and Social Sciences and Education, and the Academy of Political Science, and is a member of the New York Institute for the Humanities. He was named a fellow of the American Academy of Arts and Sciences in April 2010.

== Personal ==
Lemann has been married twice. His first wife was Dominique Alice Browning, who later became an editor in chief of House & Garden. They married on May 20, 1983, have two sons, Alexander and Theodore, and later divorced. His second wife is Judith Anne Shulevitz, a columnist for Slate, The New York Times Book Review, and The New Republic. Married on November 7, 1999, they have a son and a daughter.

== Bibliography ==
=== Books ===
Title	Year	ISBN	Publisher	Subject matter	Interviews, presentations, and reviews	Comments
The Promised Land: The Great Black Migration and How it Changed America	1991	ISBN 9780394560045	Knopf	Second Great Migration (African American)	Booknotes interview with Lemann on Promised Land, May 5, 1991, C-SPAN	Winner of the 1992 PEN/Martha Albrand Award for First Nonfiction.
The Big Test: The Secret History of the American Meritocracy	1999	ISBN 9780374299842	Farrar, Straus and Giroux	Standardized testing	Presentation by Lemann on The Big Test, September 29, 1999, C-SPAN "None of the Above" Review, by Andrew Sullivan, The New York Times, October 24, 1999. "BOOKS OF THE TIMES; What's Wrong With the SAT and Its Elite Progeny" Review by Christopher Lehmann-Haupt, The New York Times, October 4, 1999	
Redemption: The Last Battle of the Civil War	2006	ISBN 9780374248550	Farrar, Straus and Giroux	Reconstruction era	"A Less Perfect Union Review by Sean Wilentz, in The New York Times, September 10, 2006; Audio interview with Lemann on Redemption conducted by Sam Tanenhaus of the New York Times Book Review, September 10, 2006; First chapter of book, on The New York Times site. After Words interview with Lemann on Redemption, November 11, 2006, C-SPAN	
Transaction Man: The Rise of the Deal and the Decline of the American Dream	2019	ISBN 9780374277888	Farrar, Straus and Giroux	Economy of the United States	"Author Discussion on the History of Modern American Politics and the Economy", featuring Lemann discussing Transaction Man and author Rick Perstein discussing his book Reaganland, September 27, 2020, C-SPAN	
Returning: A Search for Home Across Three Centuries	2026	ISBN 9781631498428	Liveright	A memoir chronicling several generations of the Lemann family — German Jews who aspired to enter New Orleans high society in the face of antisemitism — and the author's subsequent embrace of the Jewish religion and rejection of his family's assimilation		

=== Essays and reporting ===
- "The origins of the underclass - part I" (PDF). The Atlantic Monthly. 257 (6): 31–55. June 1986.
- "The origins of the underclass - part II" (PDF). The Atlantic Monthly. 258 (1): 54–68. July 1986.
- "Jews in second place". Slate. June 1996.
- October 2004 on Philip Roth's The Plot Against America
- September 2005 commentary on Hurricane Katrina
- August 2006 article on Citizen journalism, titled "Amateur Hour: Journalism Without Journalists"
- August 2007 commentary titled Rovian Ways on Karl Rove's resignation and legacy
- "Great journalism schools : why they belong at great universities". Carnegie Reporter. 6 (3): 40–45. Fall 2011.
- "When the earth moved : what happened to the environmental movement?". The Critics. A Critic at Large. The New Yorker. 89 (9): 73–76. April 15, 2013.
- "The soul of the university". Carnegie Reporter. 7 (3): 2‒6, 83‒84. Winter 2014.
- "Bigger and better". The Talk of the Town. Comment. The New Yorker. 97 (5): 11, 14. March 22, 2021. (Note: Online version is titled "The stimulus bill is the most economically liberal legislation in decades".)
- "Give until it hurts". The Critics. Books. The New Yorker. 98 (14): 70–73. May 30, 2022. (Note: Online version is titled "Would the world be better off without philanthropists?".)

———————

Bibliography notes
