= Columbia Global Reports =

Non-profit publishing imprint

- Parent company: Columbia University
- Founded: 2015
- Country of origin: United States
- Headquarters location: New York City
- Distribution: Publishers Group West
- Publication types: Books
- Nonfiction topics: globalization, geopolitics
- No. of employees: 3
- Official website: globalreports.columbia.edu

Columbia Global Reports (CGR) is a non-profit publishing imprint founded in 2015 by Columbia University and led by Nicholas Lemann, the emeritus dean of Columbia's journalism school. Created as part of a wider globalization initiative, it is affiliated with Columbia's Committee on Global Thought.

The project was announced in February, 2014. Lemann started the ramp up to production that June by hiring veteran book publicist Camille McDuffie and former Daily Beast editor Jimmy So. Branding and design were done by Strick and Williams, who designed the logo so that "circles evolve through three stages of rotation, referencing the ever-changing nature of our planet."

The first book published by CGR was Shaky Ground: The Strange Saga of the U.S. Mortgage Giants, whose author Bethany McLean had previously written the 2003 expose of Enron The Smartest Guys in the Room. The Washington Post selected Shaky Ground as one of the best nonfiction books of 2015. Other notable authors with books published by CGR include Helen Epstein, Adam Kirsch, Clay Shirky, and Tim Wu.

Its mission is to produce "four to six ambitious works of journalism and analysis a year" on global issues, with each novella-length book available as paperback or e-book. The Columbia Journalism Review describes CGR's business model as "somewhere between a magazine and book publisher," saying, "Unlike most traditional book publishers (but like high-end magazines), Columbia Global Reports fact checks, pays writers’ expenses, and has a total production time, from signed contract to store shelves, that’s measured in months, not years."

CGR has experimented with social media, including hosting a podcast by Nicholas Lemann and participating in Instagram. In 2018, CGR was a finalist in the Shorty Awards for "Social Good," in the category of "News and Media."

According to Publishers Weekly, CGR gets most of its income from consumer sales (its books are distributed by Publishers Group West) but would not break even without support from Columbia and from foundations.
