= Nathan Glazer =

American sociologist (1923–2019)

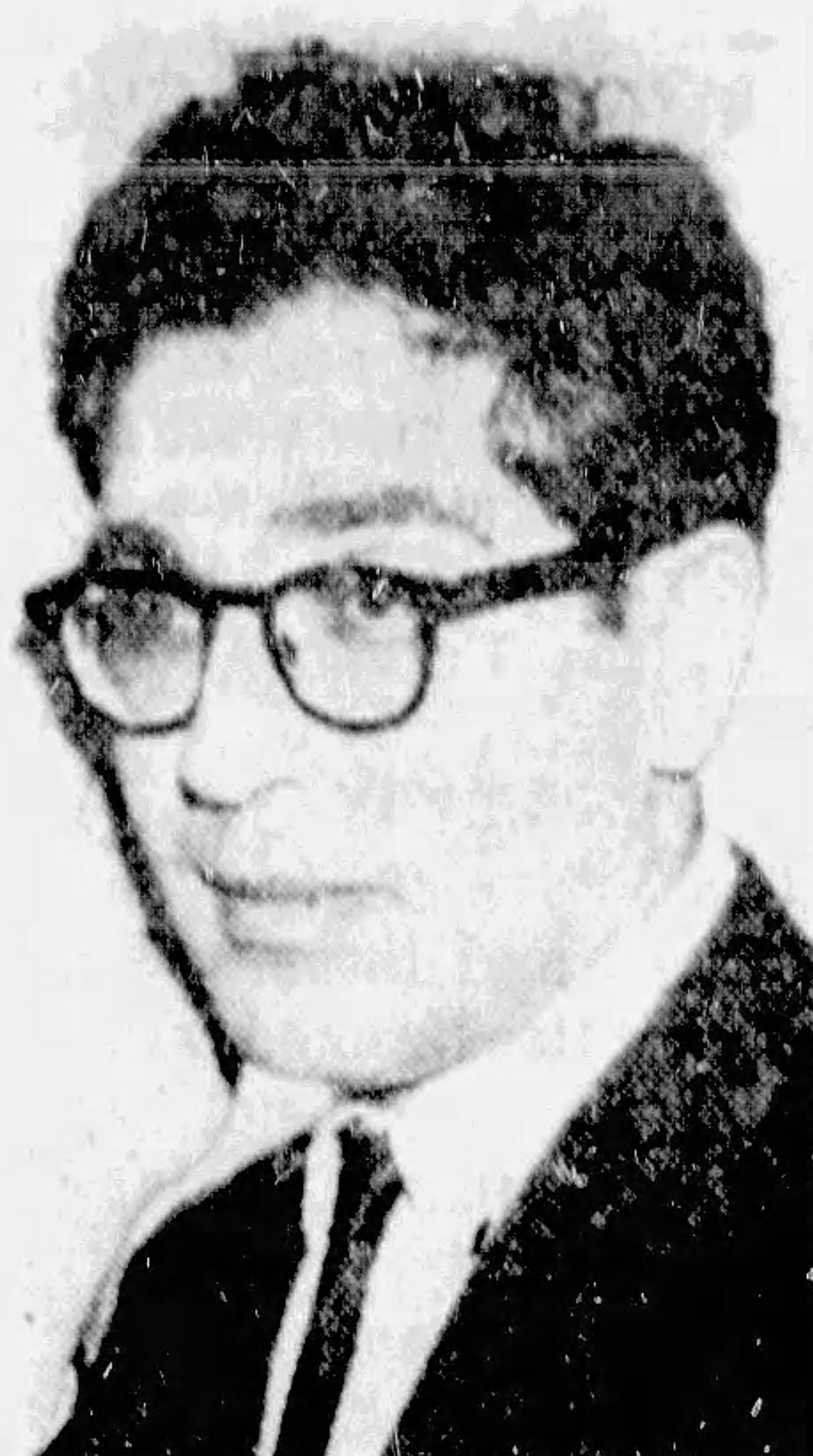
- Glazer c. 1964
- Born: February 25, 1923; New York City, New York, U.S.
- Died: January 19, 2019 (aged 95); Cambridge, Massachusetts, U.S.
- Spouses: Ruth Slotkin (m. 1942; div. 1957): Sulochana Raghavan
- Children: 3

Academic background
- Education: City College of New York; University of Pennsylvania; Columbia University
- Academic advisors: Robert K. Merton, Paul Lazarsfeld

Academic work
- Discipline: Sociology
- Doctoral students: Mustafa Emirbayer

Nathan Glazer (February 25, 1923 – January 19, 2019) was an American sociologist who taught at the University of California, Berkeley, and for several decades at Harvard University. He was a co-editor of the now-defunct policy journal The Public Interest.

Known for books such as Beyond the Melting Pot which deal with race and ethnicity, Glazer is critical of some of the Great Society programs of the mid-1960s.

He was often considered neoconservative in his thinking on domestic policy, but remained a Democrat. He described himself as "indifferent" to the neoconservative label with which he is most associated and remarked that it was an appellation not of his choosing.

== Early life ==
Born in New York City on February 25, 1923, Glazer grew up in the city's areas of East Harlem and the East Bronx. His parents, Jewish emigrants from the Russian Empire, spoke Yiddish in the home, and his father was a sewing machine operator. His older brother, Joe, would eventually become a folk musician who specialized in labor and radical themed songs. Glazer attended public school as a child and eventually the City College of New York.

When Glazer attended the City College of New York in the 1940s, it was known as a hotbed of radicalism. Glazer fell in with a number of other young Marxists who were hostile to Soviet-style communism. Glazer, Irving Howe, Daniel Bell, and Irving Kristol would meet in an alcove of the City College cafeteria, and they "spent their days trying to understand how the socialist ideal of political and economic justice had ended in Joseph Stalin’s murderous tyranny."

As Glazer would later recall, "one of the characteristics of [our] group was a notion of its universal competence... Culture, politics, whatever was happening we shot our mouths off on... It was a model created by the arrogance that if you're a Marxist you can understand anything and it was a model that even as we gave up our Marxism we nevertheless stuck with."

Looking back years later, Kristol would remark that "even at City, [Glazer] was never much of a radical."

== Early career ==
World War II led to a belief among some of the leftists, including Glazer, that fascism was a greater threat than capitalism and that the United States, as a country that fought the fascists, ought to be viewed more favorably. Glazer became a member of the anti-communist left and only mildly criticized Joseph McCarthy when writing of him in the magazine Commentary. About the same time, Glazer also undertook a detailed study of the Rosenberg Case. Glazer's investigation convinced him not only of the Rosenbergs' guilt, but also that a larger number of conspirators were involved. As Glazer said, "The story that has not been told is of espionage more extensive than we know."

Looking back at the McCarthy era over 40 years later as an interviewee in the film Arguing the World, Glazer reflected on the stance he and some other liberal anticommunists took: "Even at the time and also in retrospect we never managed to figure out a good position, one that was respectable and moral and responsive to all the complicated issues raised... I still don't think we have one." In general, much of Glazer's work in the 1950s had strong strains of patriotism and optimism about the future, including a belief that the overwhelming majority of immigrants would come to identify completely with American values and thus assimilate into American society.

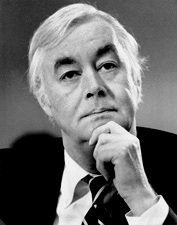
Glazer's collaborator Daniel Patrick Moynihan

In 1960, Glazer briefly edited The Committee of Correspondence Newsletter at Harvard, but soon dropped this project and began writing articles about ethnic groups in New York City, and they would eventually be collected and published in 1963 as the book Beyond the Melting Pot: The Negroes, Puerto Ricans, Jews, Italians and Irish of New York City, arguably Glazer's most well-known work. While Daniel Patrick Moynihan was listed as co-author and the book itself would often be referred to as "Moynihan and Glazer," Moynihan wrote only the chapter on the Irish and much of the conclusion, with the rest being the work of Glazer.

In essence, as one retrospective noted 25 years later, Glazer and Moynihan suggested that "the melting pot metaphor didn't hold water." The book argued that the children and grandchildren of earlier immigrants to New York City, including Puerto Ricans, Jews, Italians, and Irish, had retained their ethnic consciousness and that the phenomenon of persistent ethnic identities over the course of generations would continue to endure. That conclusion was fairly novel for the early 1960s, when there was relatively little interest in studying ethnic groups in general, much less their precise levels of adjustment.

Glazer and Moynihan also argued that the "disproportionate presence of Negroes and Puerto Ricans on welfare" was one of the primary racial problems in the city, but they suggested the 1970s could end up being a "decade of optimism" for those two groups. Years later, when marking the 25th anniversary of the book, Glazer would admit that the 1970s and indeed later years had not brought significant change for those groups and that many African Americans and Puerto Ricans remained members of the "great dependent class."

James Traub has argued that Beyond the Melting Pot was "one of the most popular, and most influential, works of sociology of its time."

== Government service, academia, and The Public Interest ==
During John F. Kennedy's presidency, Glazer worked in the Housing and Home Finance Agency, the predecessor to the Department of Housing and Urban Development. Along with working on projects that were the prelude of the poverty program, Glazer was also an advocate for historical preservation of buildings and unsuccessfully tried to prevent the demolition of New York City's original Penn Station. In Lyndon Johnson's administration, Glazer was a consultant with the Model Cities Program.

By now, Glazer was becoming skeptical of the War on Poverty and of Washington-based reform efforts in general. As he would argue years later in his book The Limits of Social Policy, Great Society programs were not really the answer because "the breakdown of traditional modes of behavior is the chief cause of our social problems," and he did not think that breakdown could be addressed by government.

By 1964, Glazer was teaching at UC Berkeley and he bore witness to the Free Speech Movement that year. Despite his earlier experience as a student radical, Glazer was one of many professors who viewed the student protesters as extremists. Even in the late 1990s, Glazer continued to condemn the students' "enthusiastic and euphoric rejection of forms and norms," and in 2005, he pointed out that the revolts at Berkeley, Columbia University, and many other campuses were "a disorder that made no sense to those of us who had come from harder circumstances."

One leader of the Free Speech Movement, Jackie Goldberg, reflecting back on 1964 decried, years later, Glazer and his ilk for espousing "an armchair intellectual liberalism" and viewing "protesting" as nothing more than sending a letter to one's congressman.

As the Free Speech Movement raged in Berkeley, Glazer's friends from City College Daniel Bell and Irving Kristol were discussing founding a new journal, which would come to be called The Public Interest when it debuted in 1965. A conference essay by Glazer, "Paradoxes of American Poverty," would appear in the journal's first issue. In the summer of 1973, he succeeded Bell, becoming co-editor along with Kristol, a post that he held until 2003. When The Public Interest ceased publication in 2005, Glazer wrote a piece, acknowledging the rightward drift on the part of the journal over the years and the tendency that it had to publish far more conservative than liberal pieces, something that he saw "as a failing on our part."

In 1969, Glazer began a teaching career at Harvard after he had been awarded one of five positions created to focus on the problems of the cities.

== Race and multiculturalism ==
Glazer continued to publish books on race and ethnicity throughout the 1980s and 1990s. We Are All Multiculturalists Now, published in 1997, perhaps created the biggest stir. In it, Glazer argued that multiculturalism was now the dominant ethic in public schools, and "assimilation" had become inappropriate. For Glazer, it was a simple reality that could not be denied, but he remained deeply ambivalent about multiculturalism. He argued that it "is not a phase we can embrace wholeheartedly, and I hope my own sense of regret that we have come to this will not escape the reader."

Writing in what one commentator deemed a "rueful" tone, he suggested his earlier arguments regarding issues such as affirmative action and the future prospects for African Americans were essentially wrong. The civil rights legislation of 1964 and 1965 did not allow blacks to fully integrate into American society, their situation was worse now than it had been 20 years before, and a multicultural curriculum in schools was essentially the result.

The book was criticized by conservatives, with Dinesh D'Souza accusing Glazer of "cowardice" in a review in The Weekly Standard, and a critique in National Review suggested Glazer was wrongly advocating for "resignation and accommodation" to multiculturalism, rather than the "forthright opposition in defense of our constitutional republic and its liberal-democratic virtues" that was needed. James Traub, on the other hand, argued, "Glazer is still the neoconservative who wrote The Limits of Social Policy," but his "own logic leaves him with nothing to offer—except the admittedly specious comforts of multiculturalism."

== Neoconservatism ==
As the term "neoconservative" became common parlance during the administration of President George W. Bush, Glazer pointed out that it had been "hijacked" and now meant something quite different from what it once had. According to Glazer, "in its early application, in the 1970s, it referred to the growing caution and skepticism among a group of liberals about the effects of social programs. It was later applied to a vigorous and expansionist democracy-promoting military and foreign policy, especially in the wake of the dissolution of the Soviet Union."

In a 2003 letter to The New York Times Glazer argued that "there is very little connection between those called "neoconservatives" 30 years ago and neoconservatives today, who are defined entirely by their hard stance on foreign and military policy."

== Later career ==
Glazer's most recent book was From a Cause to a Style: Modernist Architecture’s Encounter With the American City (2007), an essay collection "that traces the diminishment of Modernist architecture from a social revolution—which asserted that traditional architecture 'had come to an end'—down to a mere style, and one almost universally resented outside the profession."

Glazer served on committees for the National Academy of Sciences and received numerous grants and fellowships, including the Guggenheim Fellowship and the Fulbright Fellowship, throughout his career.

Glazer died at his home in Cambridge, Massachusetts, on January 19, 2019, at age 95.

== Books ==
- The Lonely Crowd: A Study of the Changing American Character with David Riesman and Reuel Denney, New Haven, Yale University Press, 1950
- Faces in the Crowd: Individual Studies in Character and Politics with David Riesman, New Haven, Yale University Press, 1952
- A New Look at the Rosenberg-Sobell Case, New York, Tamiment Institute, 1953
- American Judaism, Chicago, University of Chicago Press, 1957 (revised editions in 1972 and 1988)
- The Social Basis of American Communism, New York, Harcourt, Brace, 1961
- Negroes & Jews: The New Challenge to Pluralism New York, American Jewish Committee, 1964
- The Characteristics of American Jews, New York, Jewish Education Committee Press, 1965
- Beyond the Melting Pot: The Negroes, Puerto Ricans, Jews, Italians, and Irish of New York City with Daniel P. Moynihan, Cambridge, Massachusetts Massachusetts Institute of Technology Press, 1963 (second expanded edition in 1970)
- Remembering the Answers: Essays on the American Student Revolt, New York, Basic Books, 1970
- The Poor: A Culture of Poverty: Or A Poverty of Culture?, Grand Rapids, Eerdmans, 1971
- Affirmative Discrimination: Ethnic Inequality and Public Policy Cambridge, Massachusetts, Harvard University Press, 1975 (second edition in 1987)
- The Urban Predicament with William Gorham, Washington, The Urban Institute, 1976
- Civil Rights, Land Policy and the Cities: A Perspective on the Eighties, Cambridge, Massachusetts, Lincoln Institute of Land Policy, 1979
- Dimensions of Ethnicity: Prejudice with Thomas F. Pettigrew, George M. Fredrickson, Dale T. Knobel & Reed Ueda, Cambridge, Massachusetts, Harvard University Press, 1982
- Ethnic Groups in History Textbooks, Washington, Ethics & Public Policy Center, 1983
- Ethnic Dilemmas, 1964–1982 Cambridge, Massachusetts, Harvard University Press, 1985
- The Limits of Social Policy Cambridge, Massachusetts Harvard University Press, 1988
- The New Immigration: A Challenge to American Society, San Diego, San Diego State University Press, 1988
- Our Changing Population with Richard Thomas Gill, Upper Saddle River, Prentice Hall, 1992
- Conflicting Images: India and the United States with Sulochana Raghavan Glazer, Riverdale, Riverdale Company Pub, 2008
- We Are All Multiculturalists Now Cambridge, Massachusetts, Harvard University Press, 1997
- Sovereignty Under Challenge: How Governments Respond with John Dickey Montgomery, Piscataway, Transaction Publisher, 2002
- From a Cause to a Style: Modernist Architecture's Encounter with the American City, Princeton, Princeton University Press, 2007
- The National Mall: Rethinking Washington’s Monumental Core with Cynthia R. Field, Baltimore, Johns Hopkins University Press, 2008

As editor:

- Studies in housing & minority groups with Davis McEntire, Berkeley, University of California Press, 1960
- Perspectives on Soviet Jewry, New York, KTAV, 1971
- Ethnicity: Theory and Experience with Daniel P. Moynihan, Cambridge, Massachusetts, Harvard University Press, 1975
- The American Commonwealth, 1976 with Irving Kristol, New York, Basic Books, 1976
- Ethnic Pluralism and Public Policy: Achieving Equality in the United States and Britain with Ken Young, London, Heinemann, and Lexington, Massachusetts, Lexington Press, 1983
- Clamor at the Gates: The New American Immigration, San Francisco, ICS Press, 1985
- The Public Face of Architecture: Civic Culture and Public Spaces with Mark Lilla, New York, Simon and Schuster, 1987
- Arguing Immigration: The Debate Over the Changing Face of America with Nicolaus Mills, New York, Simon and Schuster, 1994

Preface, foreword, forward:

- The Many Faces of Anti-Semitism by Rose Feitelson and George Salomon, New York, American Jewish Committee, Institute of Human Relations, 1967
- Soviet Jewry: 1969, New York, Academic Committee on Soviet Jewry, 1969
