= The Big Test =

1999 book by Nicholas Lemann

The Big Test: The Secret History of the American Meritocracy is a 1999 history book by Nicholas Lemann ISBN 0-374-52751-2.

== See also ==
- College
- Universal access
- Peter Afflerbach
