= Martha Wolfenstein =

Prussian-born American writer (1869–1906)

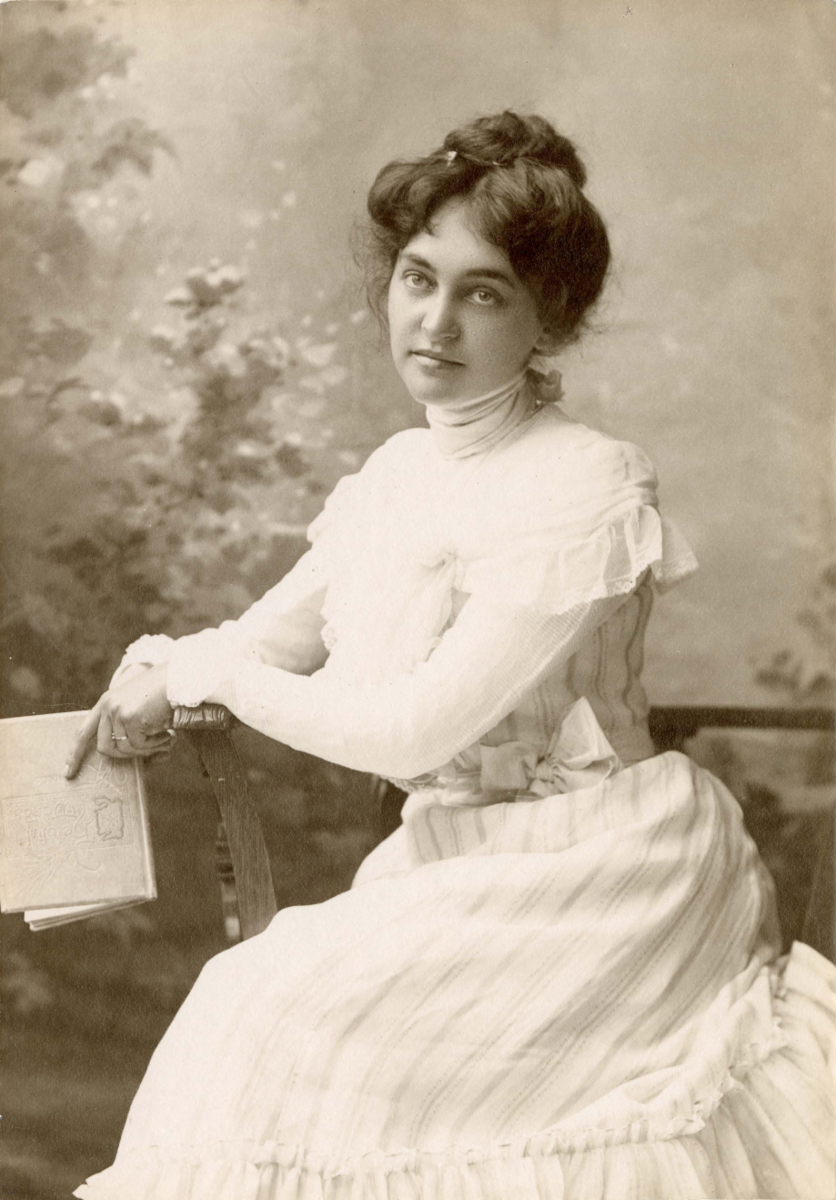
- Born: August 5, 1869; Insterburg, Gumbinnen, Kingdom of Prussia
- Died: March 17, 1906 (aged 36); Cleveland, Ohio, United States
- Resting place: Willet Street Cemetery, Cleveland
- Occupation: Author

Martha Wolfenstein (August 5, 1869 – March 17, 1906) was a Prussian-born American author. She was once described as "the best Jewish sketch writer in America."

== Early life ==
Martha Wolfenstein was born in 1869 in Insterburg, East Prussia, the eldest daughter of Dr. Samuel Wolfenstein (1841–1921) and Bertha Brieger (c. 1844–1885). Her father, who served as rabbi in that city from 1865 to 1870, had received rabbinic ordination under Zvi Mecklenburg. During her infancy the family emigrated to the United States, after her father's election as director of the local Höhere Töchterschule was overturned by the Prussian government. They eventually settled in Cleveland, Ohio, where he served as superintendent of the Jewish Orphan Asylum. She resided at the orphanage and received a public school education.

== Career ==
Wolfenstein's first publications were translations from German of short fiction by Leopold Kompert. She went on to write short stories based on her father's experiences in a Moravian Judengasse, which she contributed to many of the leading American Jewish journals, and to other magazines like McClure's and Lippincott's. Among her writings were A Priest from the Ghetto and A Sinner in Israel (in Lippincott's) and The Renegade (in the Outlook).

In 1901 the Jewish Publication Society of America released her first novel, Idyls of the Gass. A German translation was later published in Die Zeit of Vienna. It is noted for its strong female characters, and sympathetic depiction of ghetto Jews. The work received praise from Henrietta Szold, Israel Zangwill, Simon Wolf, Kaufmann Kohler, and other Jewish public intellectuals.

At the time of her death, she was working on a play.

== Death and legacy ==
Wolfenstein died from tuberculosis on March 17, 1906, after a prolonged illness. The Central Conference of American Rabbis extended official condolences to her family in recognition of her literary talents. Martha House, a residence for poor women and girls, was established in her memory the following year by the Cleveland Council of Jewish Women.

== Bibliography ==
- Idyls of the Gass. Philadelphia: The Jewish Publication Society of America. 1901.
- A Renegade and Other Tales. Philadelphia: The Jewish Publication Society of America. 1905.
