= The Lonely Crowd =

1950 book by David Riesman

- Authors: David Riesman; Nathan Glazer; Reuel Denney
- Language: English
- Publication date: 1950
- Publication place: United States
- Media type: Print

The Lonely Crowd is a 1950 sociological analysis by David Riesman, Nathan Glazer, and Reuel Denney. Together with White Collar: The American Middle Classes (1951), it is considered a landmark study of American character.

== Description ==
Riesman et al. identify and analyze three main cultural types: tradition-directed, inner-directed, and other-directed. They trace the evolution of society from a tradition-directed culture, one that moved in a direction defined by preceding generations. Tradition-directed social types obeyed rules established a long time in the past and were less likely to succeed in modern society, with its dynamic changes. "In Western history the Middle Ages can be considered a period in which the majority were tradition-directed. But the term 'tradition-directed' refers to a common element, not only the people of precapitalist Europe but also among such enormously different types of people as Hindus and Hopi Indians, Zulus and Chinese, North African Arabs and Balinese." This earliest social type was succeeded by people who were inner-directed. They discovered the potential within themselves to live and act not according to established norms but based on what they discovered using their own "psychological gyroscope". Inner-directed people live as adults what they learned in childhood, and tend to be confident, sometimes rigid. After the Industrial Revolution in America had succeeded in developing a middle-class state, institutions that had flourished within the tradition-directed and the inner-directed social framework became more secondary to daily life. The middle class gradually moved away from living according to traditions, or conforming to the values of organized religion of the family or societal codes, and the new middle class gradually adopted a malleability in the way people lived with each other. The increasing ability to consume goods and afford material abundance was accompanied by a shift away from tradition to inner-directedness and then to "other-direction".

Other-direction meant responding to the social forces deriving from how others were living—what they consumed, what they did with their time, what their views were toward politics, work, play, and so on. Riesman and his researchers found that other-directed people were flexible and willing to accommodate others to gain approval. Large organizations tended to prefer this type of personality. As Riesman writes, "The other-directed person wants to be loved rather than esteemed", not necessarily to control others but to relate to them. Those who are other-directed need assurance that they are emotionally in tune with others. By the 1940s, the other-directed character was beginning to dominate society, and that tendency grew over time.

Other-direction defined the middle class that no longer had the material need to cling to past life standards to form a cohesive society. But because the other-directed identified themselves primarily through references to others in their communities (and what they earned, owned, consumed, believed in), they inherently were restricted in their ability to know themselves. Riesman's book argues that although other-directed individuals are helpful for the smooth functioning of the modern organization, in other-direction the value of autonomy is compromised. The Lonely Crowd also argues that society dominated by the other-directed faces profound deficiencies in leadership, individual self-knowledge, and human potential.

The analyses of the parent-child relationship, of dependence on the peer group, of the ambiguous influence of the mass media, of the work-leisure dialectic, the subtle criticism of human relations, and many other aspects, are all points where the things written by Riesman show a disconcerting topicality.

The book's title was chosen by the publisher, not by Riesman or his co-authors, Nathan Glazer and Reuel Denney. The title may be misleading, because it conveys and evokes a sense of loss and fall of some good or value that human beings of previous eras would have had and which instead the atomized and solitary man of mass society would lack, and this was certainly not the author's intent. In Riesman there is no nostalgia for the individual as a heroic figure that winds its way through the writings of Frankfurt School theorists such as Marcuse or Horkheimer, just as there is no stinging criticism of conformism that hovers among the detractors of mass society.
