= David Riesman =

American sociologist and educator (1909–2002)

- Born: September 22, 1909; Philadelphia, Pennsylvania, U.S.
- Died: May 10, 2002 (aged 92); Binghamton, New York, U.S.
- Education: Harvard University
- Occupation: Sociologist
- Known for: The Lonely Crowd (1950)
- Parent: David Riesman

David Riesman (September 22, 1909 – May 10, 2002) was an American sociologist, educator, and best-selling commentator on American society.

== Career ==
Born to a wealthy German Jewish family, Riesman attended Harvard College, where he graduated in 1931 with a degree in biochemistry. He attended Harvard Law School, where he was a member of the Harvard Law Review. Riesman clerked for Supreme Court Justice Louis Brandeis between 1935 and 1936. He also taught at what is now the University at Buffalo Law School and at the University of Chicago.

He worked for Sperry Gyroscope company during the war. After a fellowship at Yale to write The Lonely Crowd, he returned to Chicago. In 1958, he became a university professor at Harvard. He was a member of the American Academy of Arts and Sciences (1955) and the American Philosophical Society (1974). Intellectually he was influenced most by Erich Fromm, as well as Carl Friedrich, Hannah Arendt, Leo Löwenthal, Robert K. Merton, Paul Lazarsfeld, Paul Goodman, Martha Wolfenstein, and Nathan Leites. He widely referenced the works of Thorstein Veblen, Max Weber, and Sigmund Freud.

== The Lonely Crowd ==
Daniel Horowitz says The Lonely Crowd: A Study of the Changing American Character, in 1950

quickly became the nation’s most influential and widely read mid-century work of social and cultural criticism. It catapulted its author to the cover of Time magazine in 1954, making Riesman the first social scientist so honored.... Riesman offered a nuanced and complicated portrait of the nation’s middle and upper-middle classes.... Riesman pictured a nation in the midst of a shift from a society based on production to one fundamentally shaped by the market orientation of a consumer culture. He explored how people used consumer goods to communicate with one another.

The book is largely a study of modern conformity, which postulates the existence of the "inner-directed" and "other-directed" personalities. Riesman argued that the character of post-World War II American society impels individuals to "other-directedness," the preeminent example being modern suburbia, where individuals seek their neighbors' approval and fear being outcast from their community. That lifestyle has a coercive effect, which compels people to abandon "inner-direction" of their lives, and it induces them to take on the goals, ideology, likes, and dislikes of their community.

This creates a tightly grouped crowd of people that is yet incapable of fulfilling each other's desires. The book is considered a landmark study of American character. Riesman was a major public intellectual as well as a sociologist and represented an early example of what sociologists now call "public sociology".

== American higher education ==
In addition to his many other publications, Riesman was also a noted commentator on American higher education, publishing, with his seminal work, The Academic Revolution, which was co-written with Christopher Jencks. In it, Riesman sums up his position by stating, "If this book has any single message it is that the academic profession increasingly determines the character of undergraduate education in America."

Riesman highlights the effects of the "logic of the research university," which focuses upon strict disciplinary research. That both sets the goals of the research university and produces its future professors. Riesman noted that the logic isolated any patterns of resistance that might challenge the university's primary purpose as disciplinary research, dashing their chances of success.

== See also ==
- List of law clerks for the fourth seat of the Supreme Court of the United States
