= Hannah Arendt =

German, Jewish, and American historian and philosopher (1906–1975)

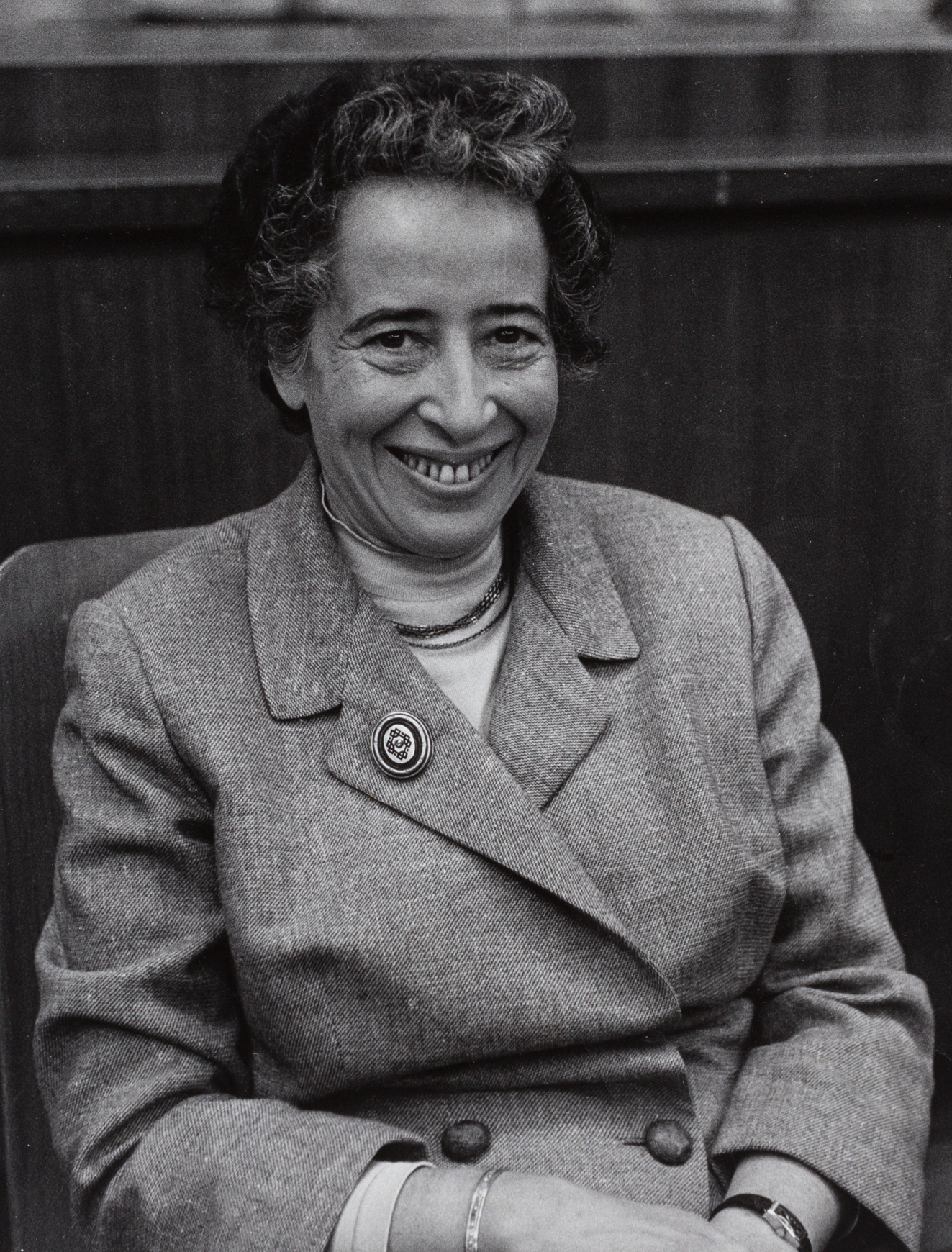
- Arendt in 1958
- Born: Johanna Arendt; 14 October 1906; Linden, Province of Hanover, Kingdom of Prussia, German Empire
- Died: 4 December 1975 (aged 69); New York City, US
- Resting place: Bard College
- Other name: Hannah Arendt Bluecher
- Citizenship: Prussia (1906–1937); Stateless (1937–1950); United States (from 1951)
- Spouses: Günther Anders (m. 1929; div. 1937) Heinrich Blücher (m. 1940; died 1970)
- Relatives: Max Arendt (grandfather); Henriette Arendt (aunt)

Education
- Education: University of Berlin; University of Marburg; University of Freiburg; University of Heidelberg (PhD, 1929)
- Doctoral advisor: Karl Jaspers
- Other advisor: Martin Heidegger

Philosophical work
- Era: 20th-century philosophy
- Region: Western philosophy
- School: List: Continental philosophy; Existential phenomenology; Classical republicanism; Action theory (posthumous attribution)
- Institutions: Princeton University; University of Chicago; Yale University; The New School; Bard College
- Main interests: Political theory, theory of totalitarianism, philosophy of history, theory of modernity
- Notable works: List: The Origins of Totalitarianism (1951); The Human Condition (1958); On Revolution (1963); "The Life of the Mind" (1977)
- Notable ideas: List: Humanity as Homo faber; Humanity as animal laborans; The labor–work distinction; The banality of evil; Desk murderer; Distinction between vita activa and vita contemplativa (praxis as the highest level of the vita activa); Auctoritas; Natality

Hannah Arendt (Note: English: /ˈɛərənt, ˈɑːrənt/ A(I)R-ənt, US also /əˈrɛnt/ ə-RENT; German: [ˈhana ˈaːʁənt].) (born Johanna Arendt; 14 October 1906 – 4 December 1975) was a German and American philosopher, political theorist, and public historian. She was one of the most influential political theorists of the twentieth century.

Her works cover a broad range of topics, but she is best known for those dealing with the nature of wealth, power, fame, and evil, as well as politics, direct democracy, authority, tradition, and totalitarianism. She is also remembered for the controversy surrounding the trial of Adolf Eichmann, for her attempt to explain how ordinary people become actors in totalitarian systems, and for the phrase "the banality of evil". Her name appears in the names of journals, schools, scholarly prizes, humanitarian prizes, think-tanks, and streets; appears on stamps and monuments; and is attached to other cultural and institutional markers that commemorate her thought.

Hannah Arendt was born to a German-Jewish family in Linden in 1906. Her father died when she was seven. Arendt was raised in a politically progressive, secular family, her mother being an ardent Social Democrat. After completing secondary education in Berlin, Arendt studied at the University of Marburg under Martin Heidegger, with whom she engaged in a romantic affair that began while she was his student. She obtained her doctorate in philosophy at the University of Heidelberg in 1929. Her dissertation was entitled Love and Saint Augustine, and her supervisor was the existentialist philosopher Karl Jaspers.

In 1933, Arendt was briefly imprisoned by the Gestapo for performing illegal research into antisemitism. On release, she fled Germany, settling in Paris. There she worked for Youth Aliyah, assisting young Jews to emigrate to the British Mandate of Palestine. When Germany invaded France she was detained as an alien by the French government. She escaped and made her way to the United States in 1941. She became a writer and editor and worked for the Jewish Cultural Reconstruction, becoming an American citizen in 1950. With the publication of The Origins of Totalitarianism in 1951, her reputation as a thinker and writer was established, and a series of works followed. These included the books The Human Condition in 1958, as well as Eichmann in Jerusalem and On Revolution in 1963. She taught at many American universities while declining tenure-track appointments. She died suddenly of a heart attack in 1975, leaving her last work, The Life of the Mind, unfinished.

== Early life and education (1906–1929) ==
=== Family ===
Parents

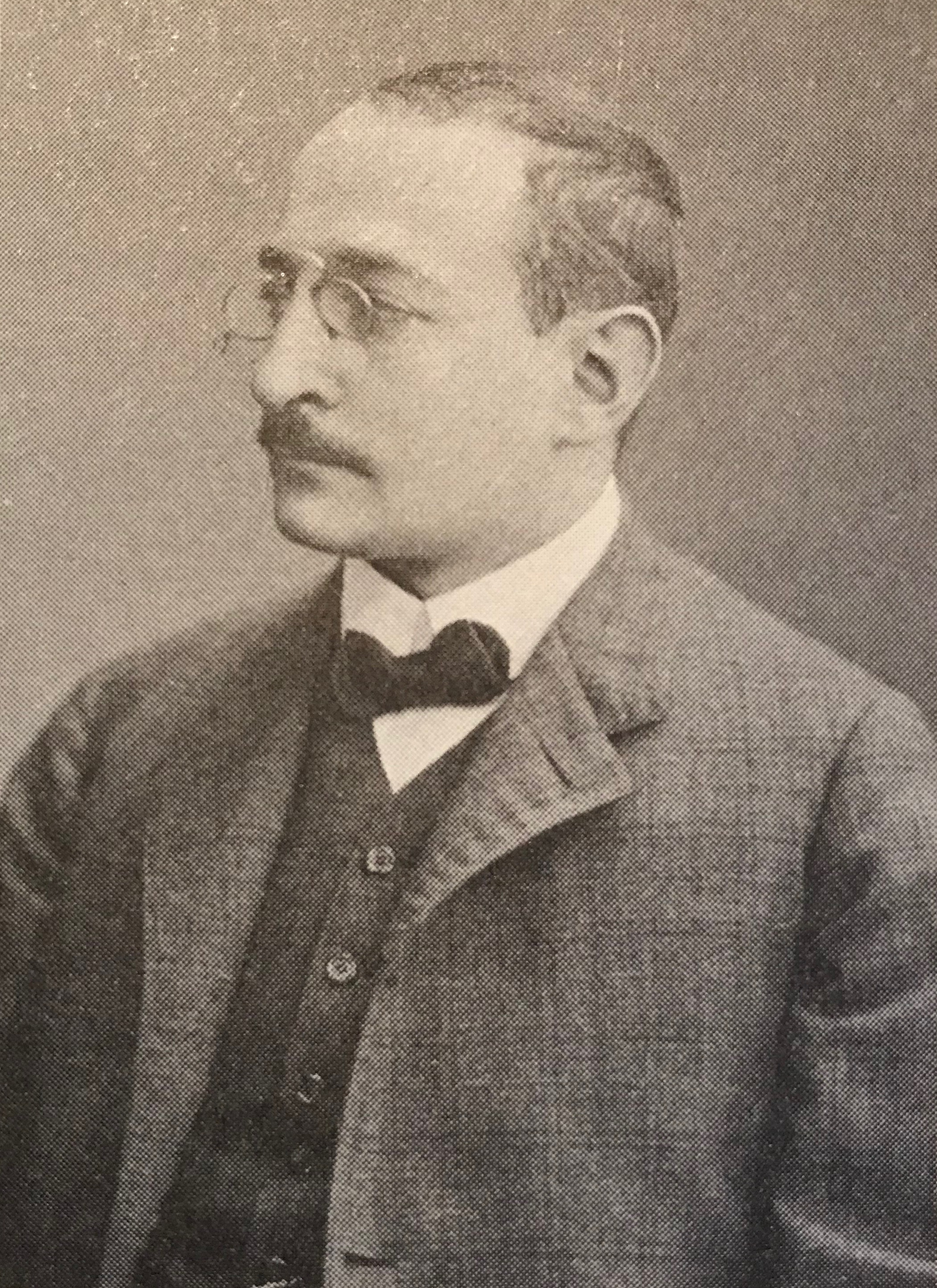
Paul Arendt c. 1900

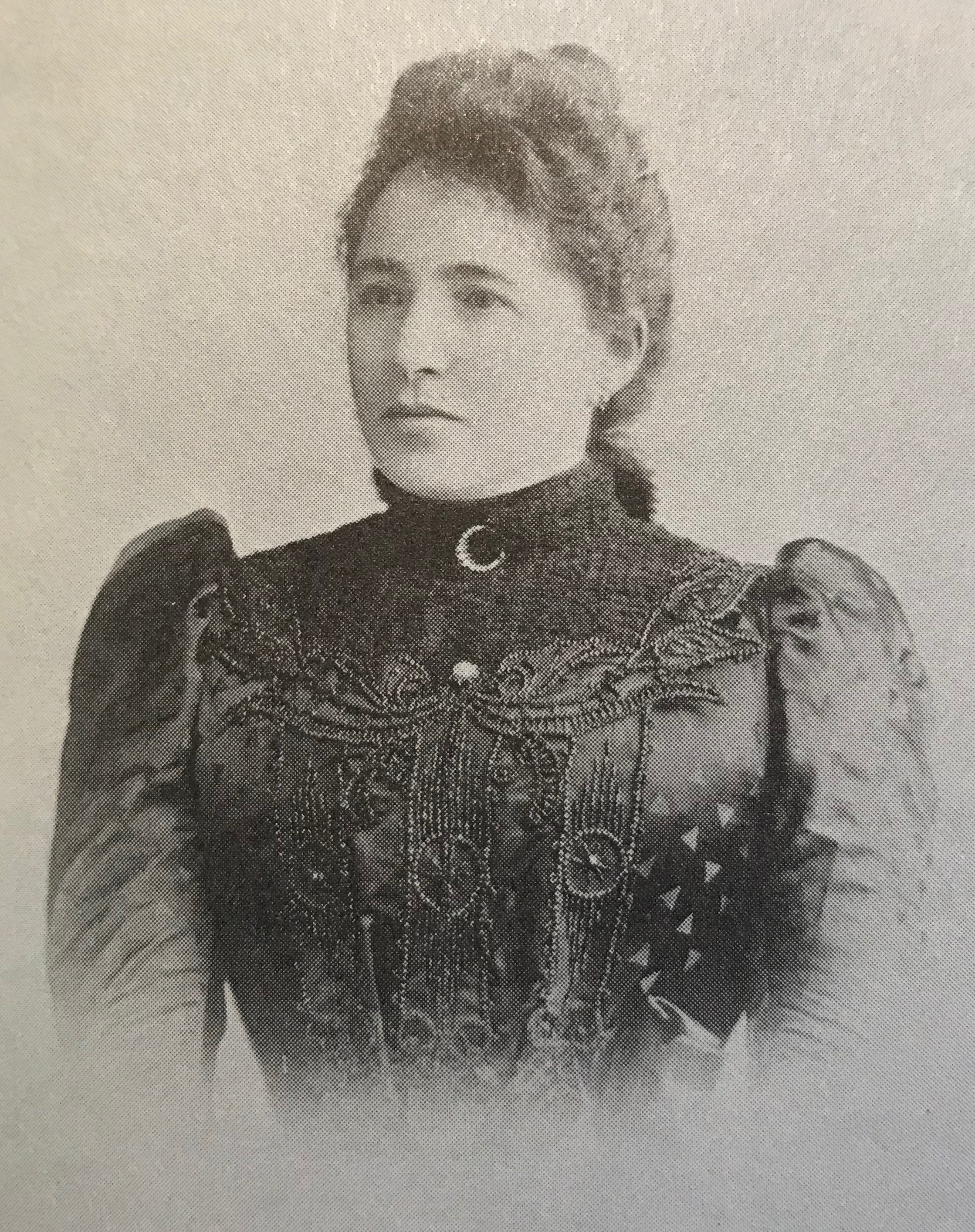
Martha Cohn c. 1899

Hannah Arendt was born Johanna Arendt in 1906, in the Wilhelmine period. Her secular, educated, and well-established Jewish family lived comfortably in Linden, Prussia. They were merchants from Königsberg. (Note: Königsberg was the East Prussian capital and after World War II became Kaliningrad, Russia.) Her grandparents were members of the Reform Jewish community. Her paternal grandfather, Max Arendt, was a prominent businessman, local politician, and leader of the Königsberg Jewish community, a member of the Central Organization for German Citizens of Jewish Faith (Centralverein deutscher Staatsbürger jüdischen Glaubens). Like other members of the Centralverein he primarily saw himself as German, disapproving of Zionists and Zionist activities, including Kurt Blumenfeld, a frequent visitor and later one of Hannah's mentors. Her lifelong best-friend, Anne Mendelssohn, was likewise connected to a dynasty of philosophers and musicians. Of Max Arendt's children, Paul Arendt was an engineer and Henriette Arendt a policewoman and social worker.

Hannah was the only child of Paul and Martha Arendt (née Cohn), who were married on 11 April 1902. She was named after her paternal grandmother. The Cohns had originally come to Königsberg from nearby Russian territory of Lithuania in 1852, as refugees from antisemitism, and made their living as tea importers, J. N. Cohn & Company being the largest business in the city. The Arendts reached Germany from Russia a century earlier. Hannah's extended family contained many more women, who shared the loss of husbands and children. Hannah's parents were more educated and politically more to the left than her grandparents. The young couple were Social Democrats, rather than the German Democrats that most of their contemporaries supported. Paul Arendt was educated at the Albertina (University of Königsberg). Though he worked as an engineer, he prided himself on his love of Classics, with a large library that Hannah immersed herself in. Martha Cohn, a musician, had studied for three years in Paris.

In the first four years of their marriage, the Arendts lived in Berlin, and were supporters of the socialist journal Socialist Monthly Bulletins (Sozialistische Monatshefte). (Note: Sozialistische Monatshefte was edited by the Königsberg Jewish scholar, Joseph Bloch, and formed the focal point of Martha Arendt's Königsberg socialist discussion group) At the time of Hannah's birth, Paul Arendt was employed by an electrical engineering firm in Linden, and they lived in a frame house on the market square (Marktplatz). They moved back to Königsberg in 1909 because of Paul's deteriorating health. He suffered from chronic syphilis and was institutionalized in the Königsberg psychiatric hospital in 1911. For years afterward, Hannah had to have annual WR tests for congenital syphilis. He died on 30 October 1913, when Hannah was seven, leaving her mother to raise her. They lived in a house on Tiergartenstraße 51, a leafy residential street adjacent to the Königsberg Tiergarten, in the predominantly Jewish neighborhood of Hufen. Although Hannah's parents were non-religious, they were happy to allow Max Arendt to take Hannah to the Reform synagogue. She also received religious instruction from the rabbi, Hermann Vogelstein, who would come to her school for that purpose. (Note: The young Hannah confided that she wished to marry Hermann Vogelstein when she grew up.) Her family moved in circles that included many intellectuals and professionals. It was a social circle of high standards and ideals. As she recalled it:

My early intellectual formation occurred in an atmosphere where nobody paid much attention to moral questions; we were brought up under the assumption: Das Moralische versteht sich von selbst, moral conduct is a matter of course.

The Arendt Family

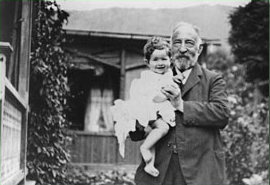
Hannah Arendt with her grandfather, Max, in 1907

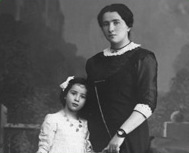
Hannah with her mother in 1912

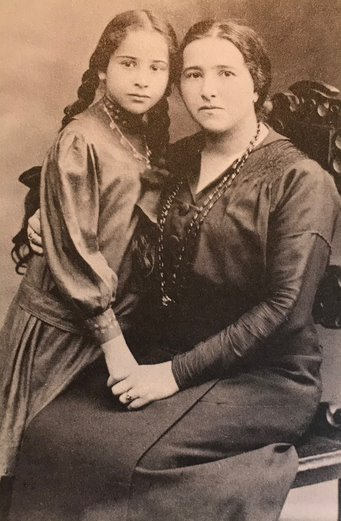
Hannah with her mother in 1914

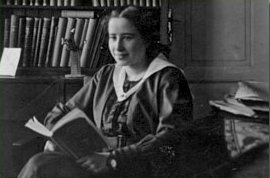
Hannah as a schoolgirl in 1920

This time was a particularly favorable period for the Jewish community in Königsberg, an important center of the Haskalah (Jewish Enlightenment). Arendt's family was thoroughly assimilated ("Germanized") and she later remembered: "With us from Germany, the word 'assimilation' received a 'deep' philosophical meaning. You can hardly realize how serious we were about it." Despite these conditions, the Jewish population lacked full citizenship rights, and although antisemitism was not overt, it was not absent. Arendt came to define her Jewish identity negatively after encountering overt antisemitism as an adult. She came to greatly identify with Rahel Varnhagen, the Prussian socialite who desperately wanted to assimilate into German culture, only to be rejected because she was born Jewish. Arendt later said of Varnhagen that she was "my very closest woman friend, unfortunately dead a hundred years now". (Note: Varnhagen would later become the subject of a biography by Hannah.)

Beerwald-Arendt Family

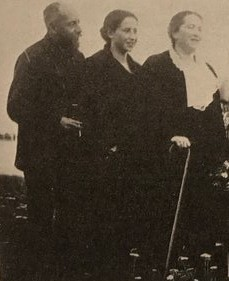
Martin Beerwald, Hannah and her mother, 1923

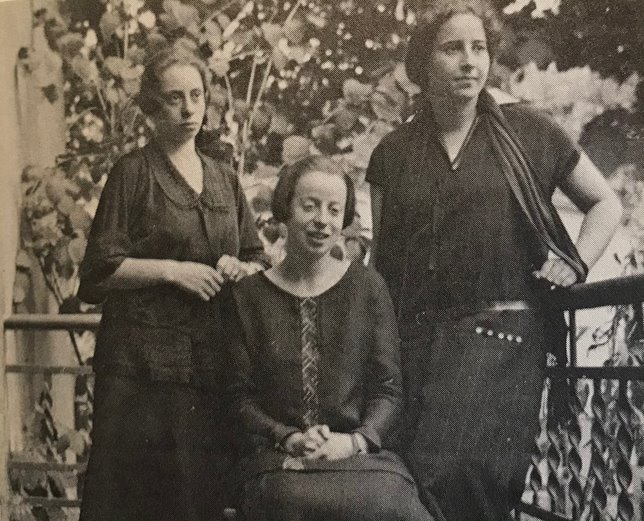
Eva and Clara Beerwald & Hannah, 1922

In the last two years of the First World War, Hannah's mother organized social democratic discussion groups and became a follower of Rosa Luxemburg as socialist uprisings broke out across Germany. Luxemburg's writings would later influence Hannah's political thinking. In 1920, Martha Cohn married Martin Beerwald, an ironmonger and widower of four years, and they moved to his home, two blocks away, at Busoldstrasse 6, providing Hannah with improved social and financial security. Hannah was 14 at the time and acquired two older stepsisters, Clara and Eva.

=== Education ===
==== Early education ====
Schools

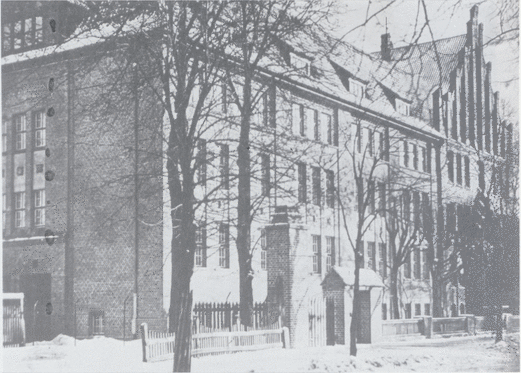
Hufen-Oberlyzeum c. 1923

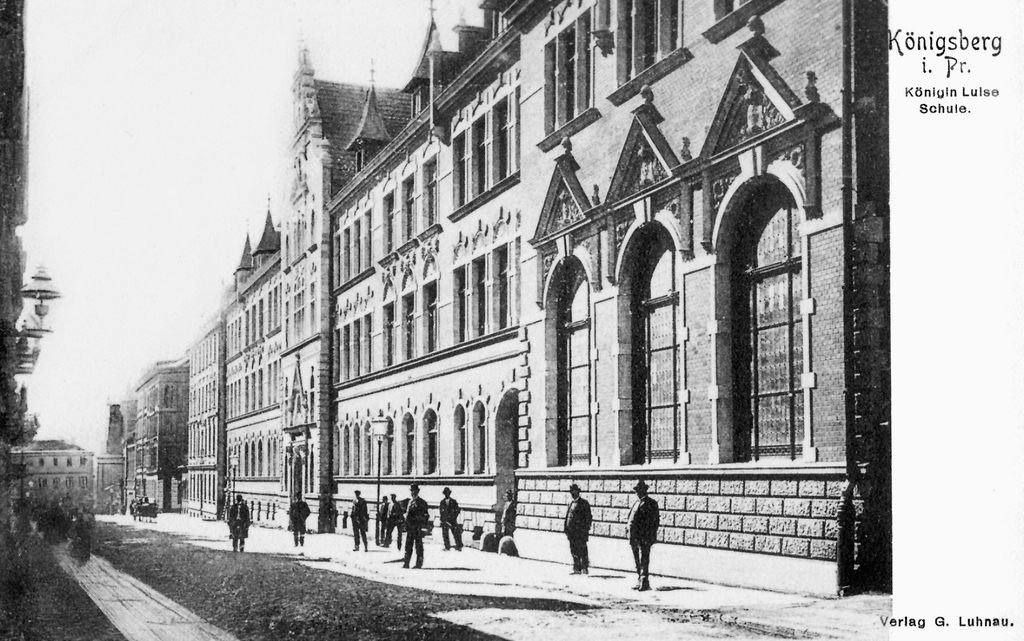
Königin-Luise-Schule in Königsberg c. 1914

Hannah Arendt's mother, who considered herself progressive, raised her daughter along strict Goethean lines. Among other things this involved the reading of Goethe's complete works, summed up as Was aber ist deine Pflicht? Die Forderung des Tages (And just what is your duty? The demands of the day). (Note: From Wilhelm Meister's Apprenticeship (1796)) Goethe was then considered the essential mentor of Bildung ('education'), the conscious formation of mind, body and spirit. The key elements were considered to be self-discipline, constructive channeling of passion, renunciation and responsibility for others. Hannah's developmental progress (Entwicklung) was carefully documented by her mother in a book, she called Unser Kind ('our child'), measuring her against the benchmark of what was then considered normale Entwicklung ('normal development').

Arendt attended kindergarten from 1910 where her precocity impressed her teachers and enrolled in the Szittnich School, Königsberg (Hufen-Oberlyzeum), on Bahnstraße in August 1913, but her studies there were interrupted by the outbreak of World War I, forcing the family to temporarily flee to Berlin on 23 August 1914, in the face of the advancing Russian army. There they stayed with her mother's younger sister, Margarethe Fürst, and her three children, while Hannah attended a girl's Lyzeum school in Berlin-Charlottenburg. After ten weeks, when Königsberg appeared to be no longer threatened, the Arendts were able to return, where they spent the remaining war years at her grandfather's house. Arendt's precocity continued, learning ancient Greek as a child, writing poetry in her teenage years, and starting both a Graecae (reading group for studying classical literature) and philosophy club at her school. She was fiercely independent in her schooling and a voracious reader, (Note: Anne Mendelssohn described her as someone who had "read everything") absorbing French and German literature and poetry (committing large amounts to memory) and philosophy.

By the age of 14, she had read Kierkegaard, Jaspers' Psychologie der Weltanschauungen and Kant's Kritik der reinen Vernunft (Critique of Pure Reason). Kant, whose hometown was also Königsberg, was an important influence on her thinking, and it was Kant who had written about Königsberg that "such a town is the right place for gaining knowledge concerning men and the world even without travelling".

Arendt attended the Königin-Luise-Schule for her secondary education, a girls' Gymnasium on Landhofmeisterstraße. During her school years, most of her friends were gifted children of Jewish professional families, generally older than she was, who went on to university. Among them was Ernst Grumach, who introduced her to his girlfriend, Anne Mendelssohn, (Note: Anne Mendelssohn: Descendant of Moses Mendelssohn and Felix Mendelssohn, an influential local family. Anne left Germany for Paris at the same time as Arendt, married the philosopher Éric Weil in 1934, and worked for the French Resistance under the alias Dubois. She died on 5 July 1984) who would become a lifelong friend. When Anne moved away, Ernst became Arendt's first romantic relationship. (Note: Like Arendt, Anne Mendelssohn would go on to become a philosopher, obtaining her doctorate at Hamburg, while Ernst became a philologist.)

Early homes

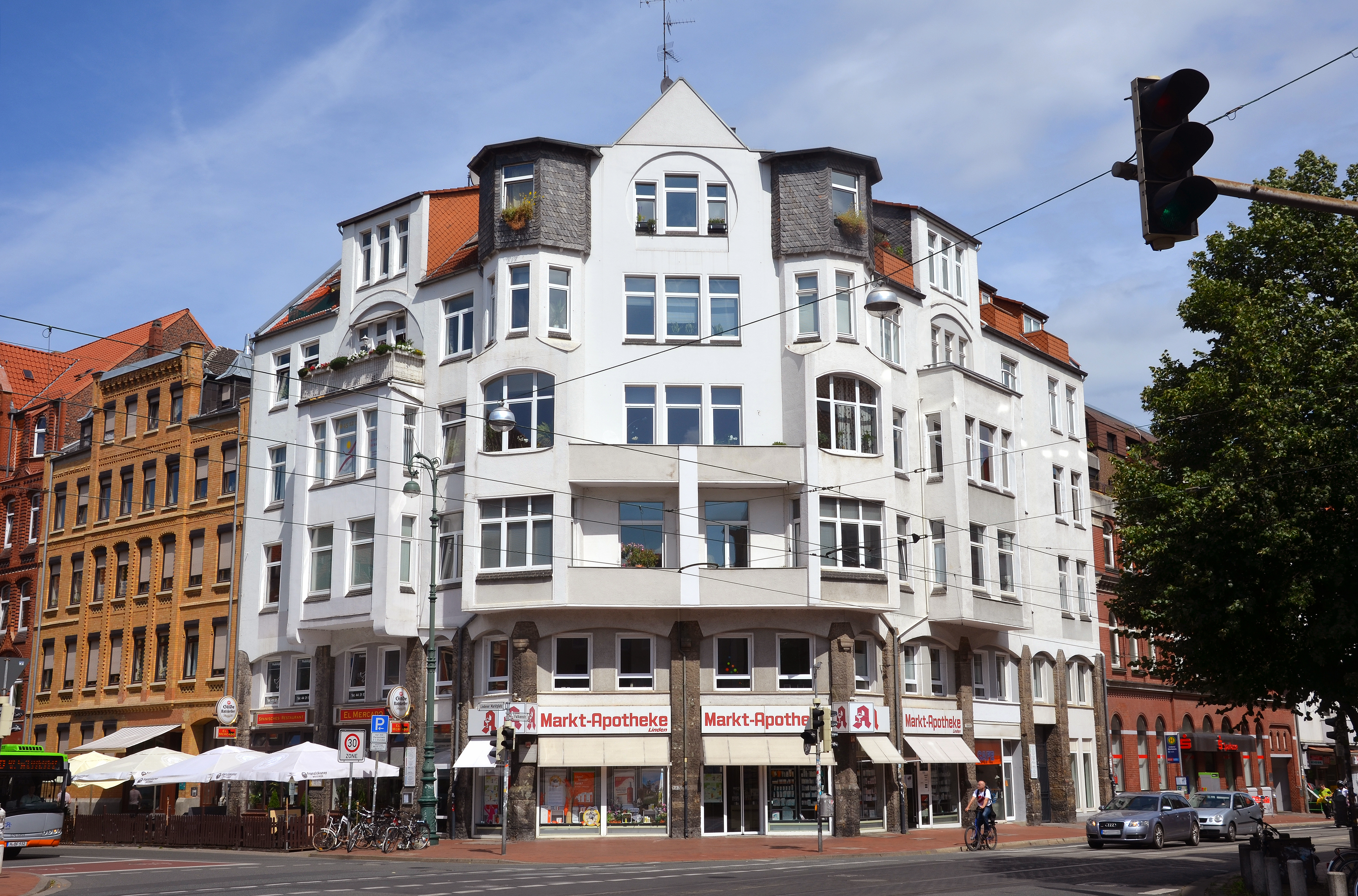
Hannah Arendt's birthplace in Linden

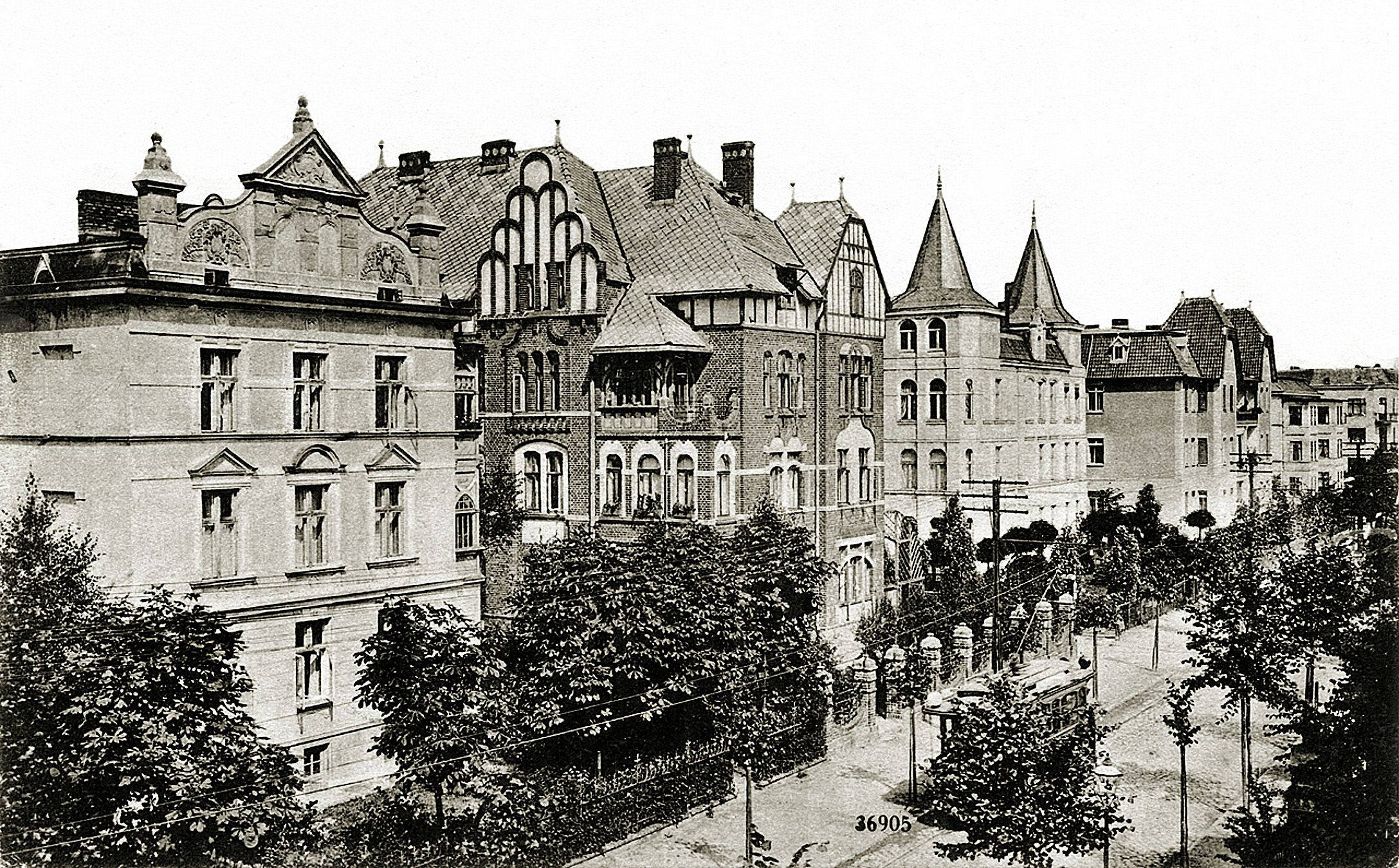
Tiergartenstraße, Königsberg 1920s

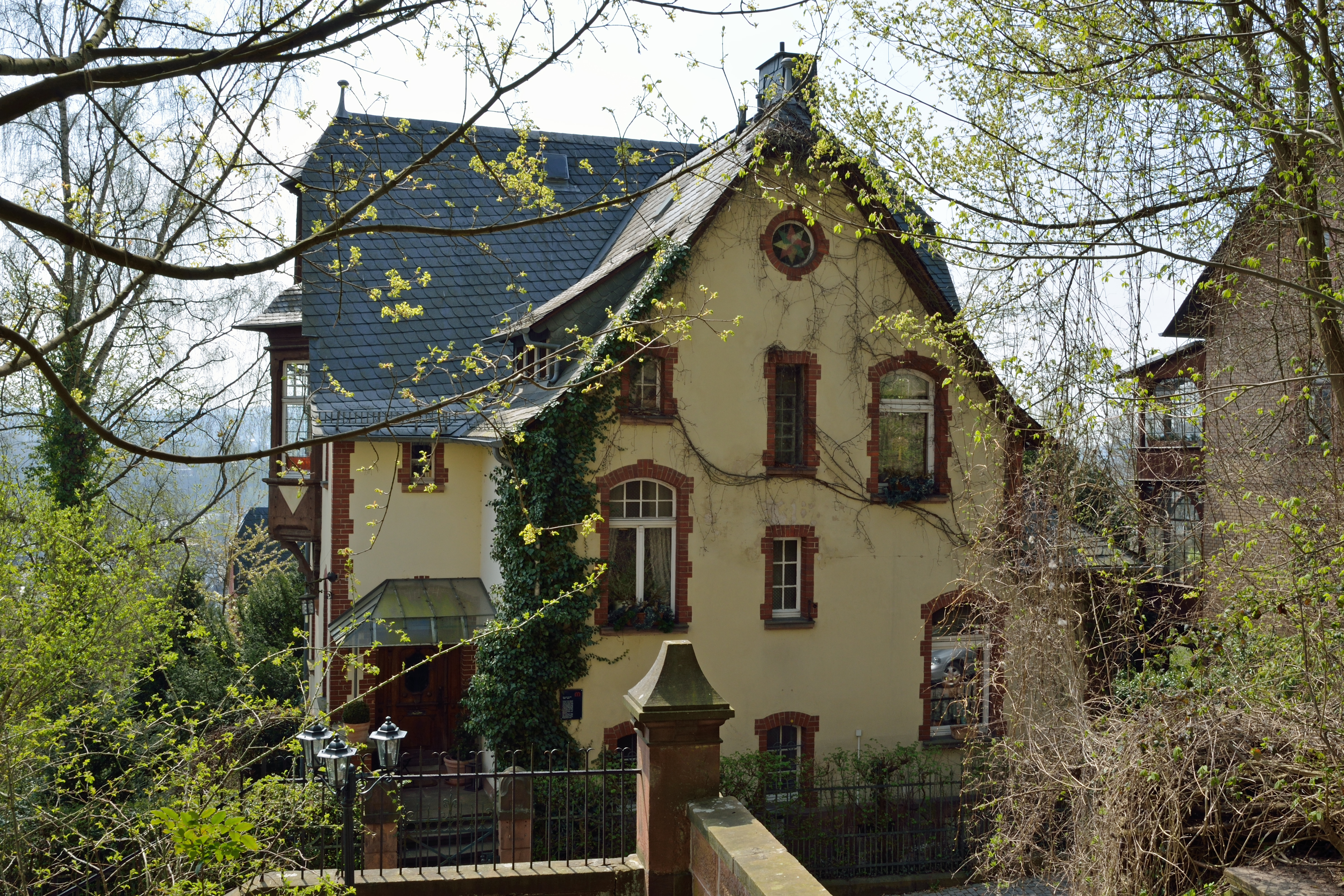
Lutherstraße 4, Marburg

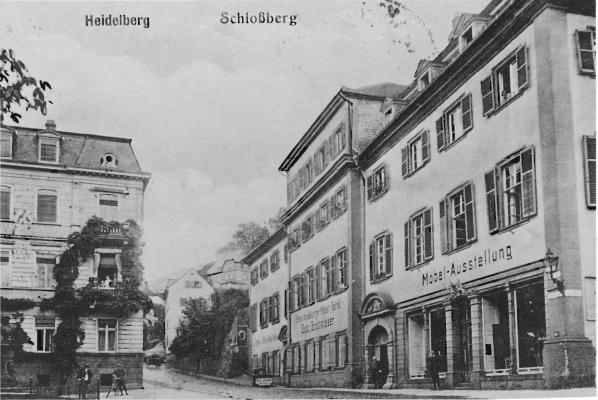
Schlossberg, Heidelberg

==== Higher education (1922–1929) ====
Almae matres

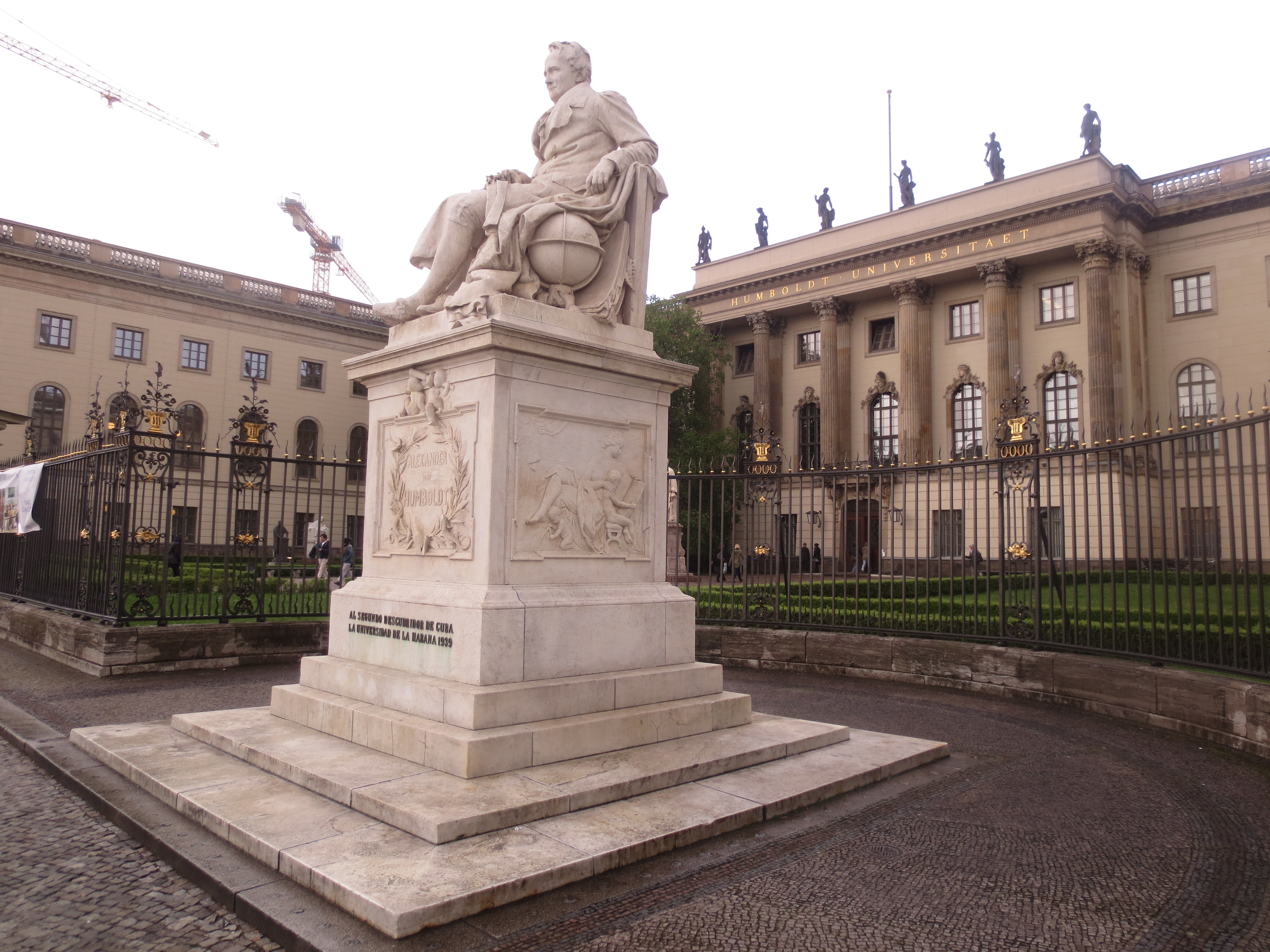
Berlin University

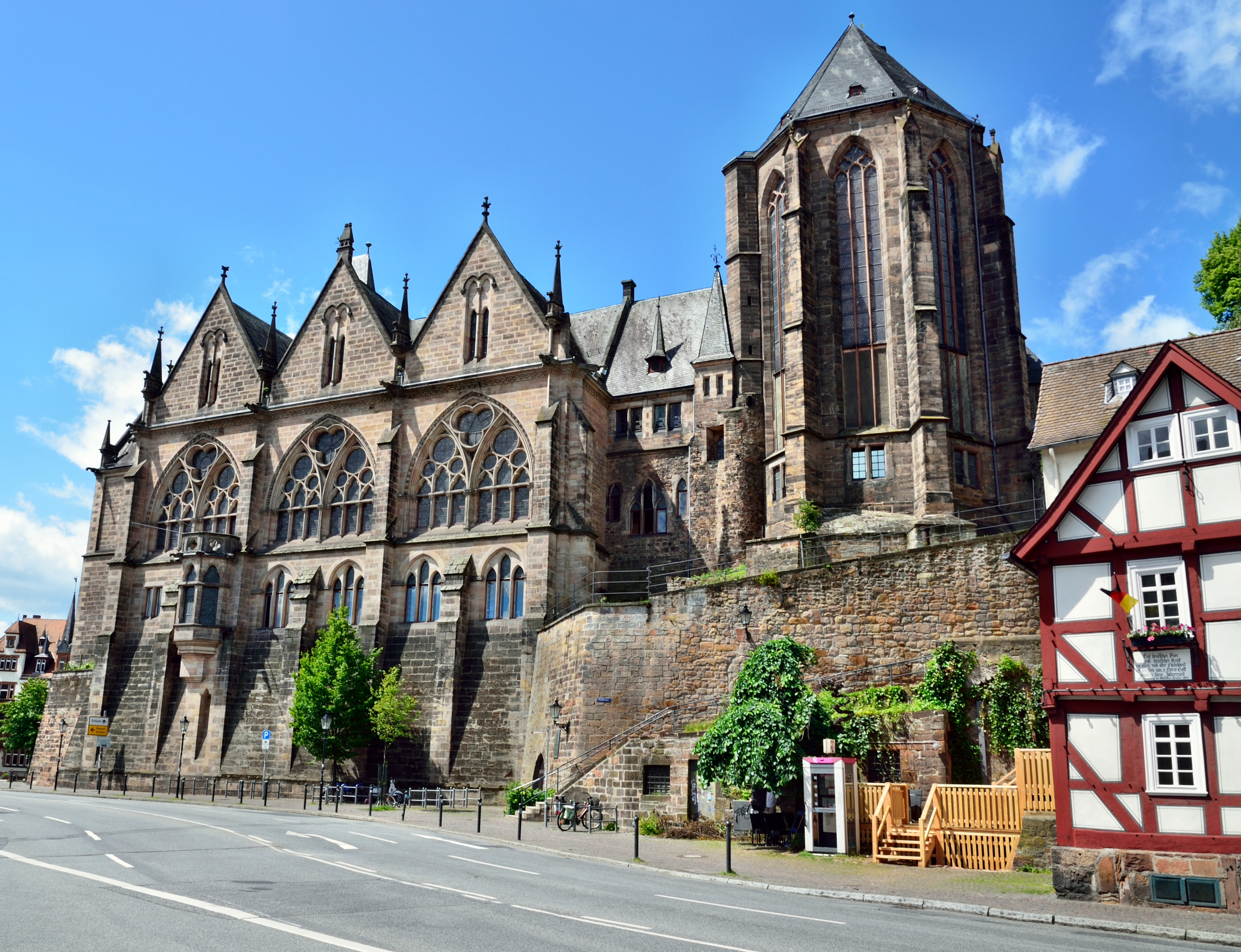
Marburg University

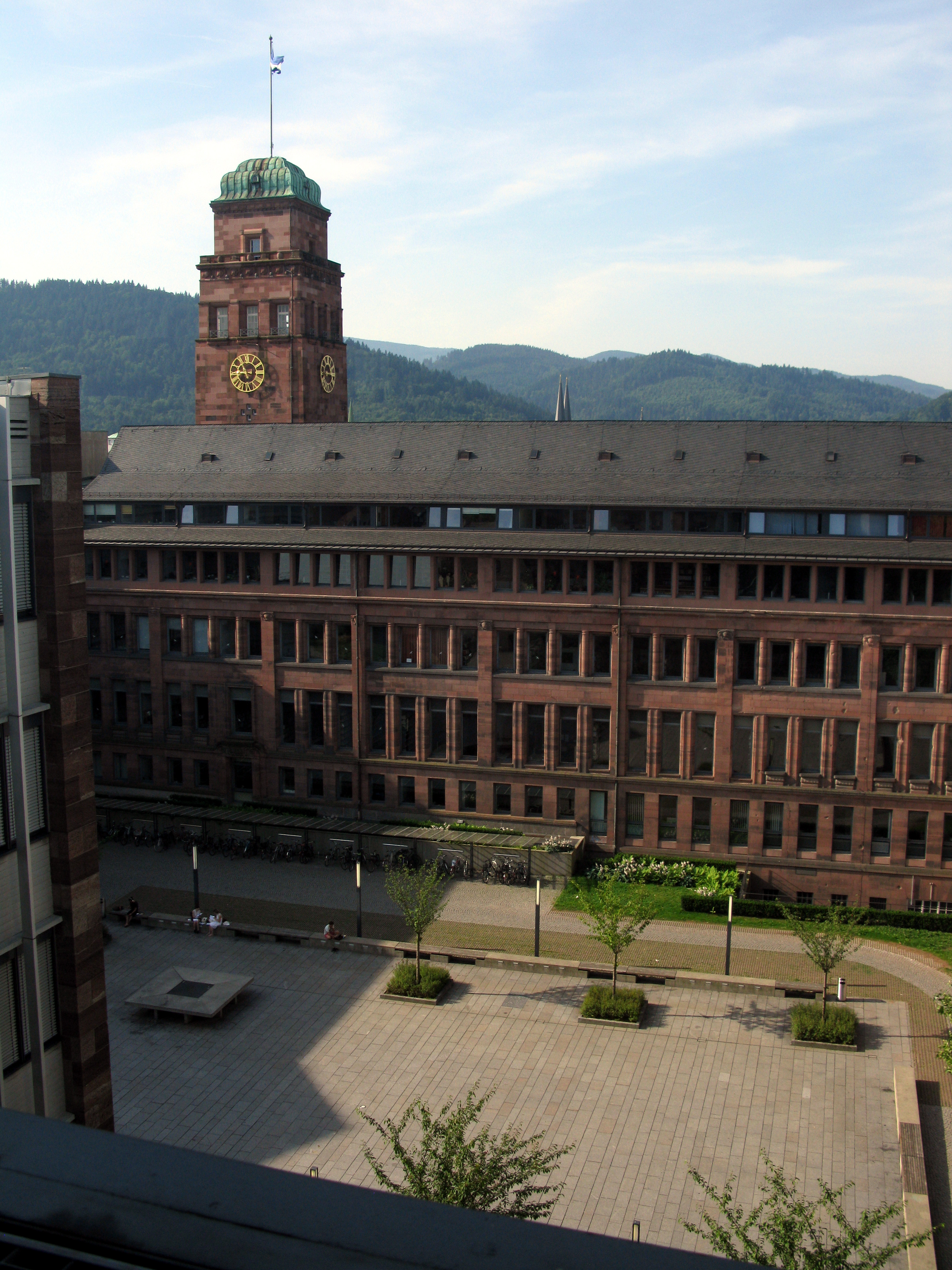
Freiburg University

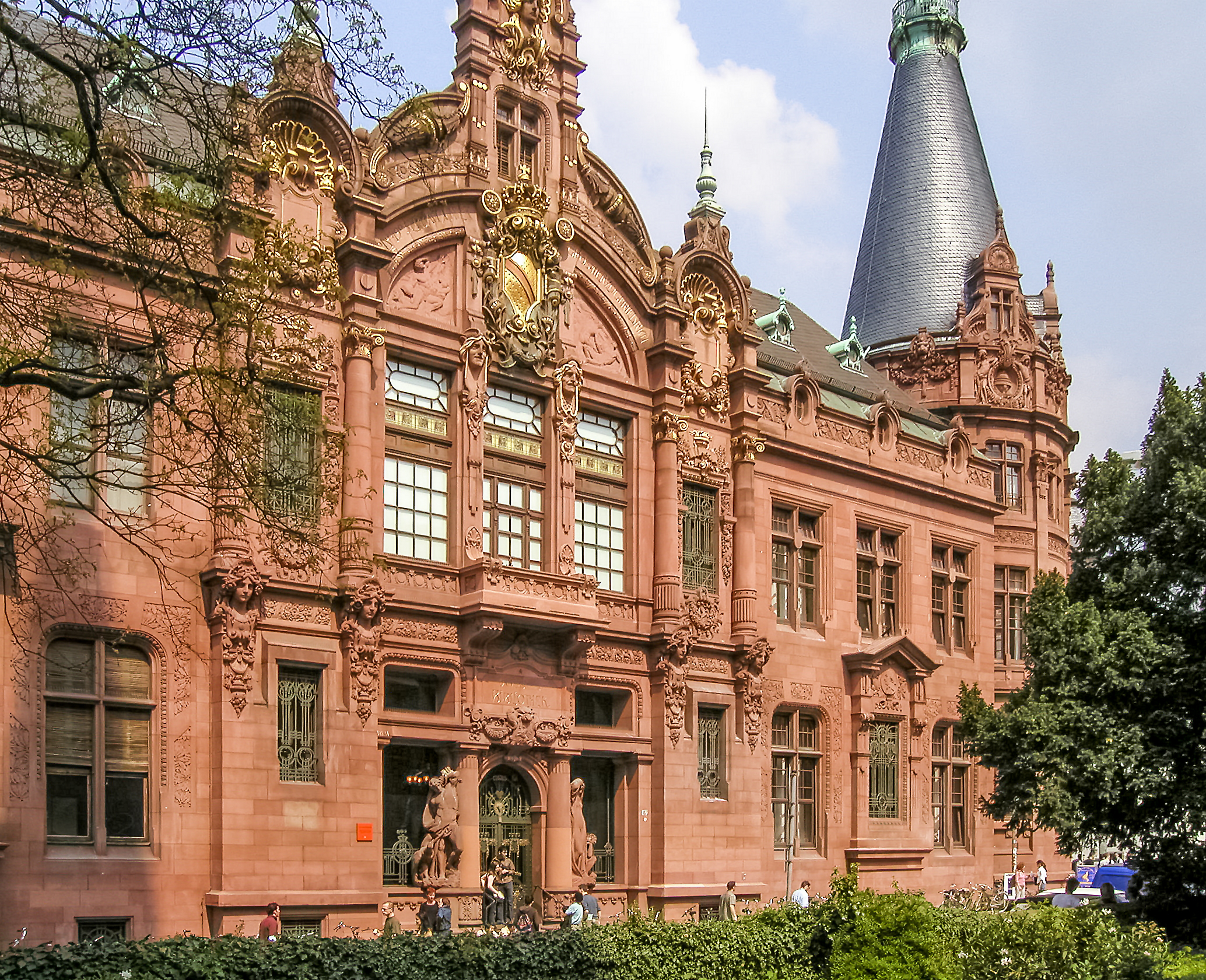
Heidelberg University

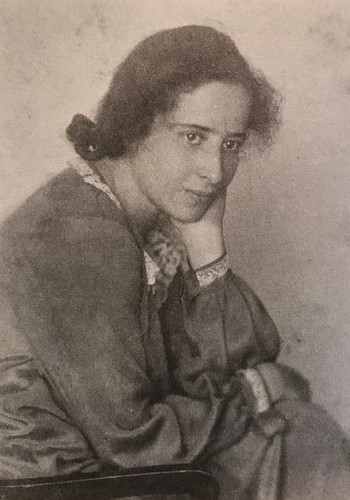
Hannah, 1924

===== Berlin (1922–1924) =====
Arendt was expelled from the Luise-Schule in 1922, at the age of 15, for leading a boycott of a teacher who insulted her. Her mother sent her to Berlin to Social Democrat family friends. She lived in a student residence and audited courses at the University of Berlin (1922–1923), including classics and Christian theology under Romano Guardini. She successfully sat for the entrance examination (Abitur) for the University of Marburg, where Ernst Grumach had studied with Martin Heidegger (appointed as a professor in 1923). Her mother had engaged a private tutor, and her aunt Frieda Arendt, a teacher, also helped, while Frieda's husband Ernst Aron provided financial tuition assistance.

===== Marburg (1924–1926) =====
In Berlin, Guardini had introduced her to Kierkegaard, and she resolved to make theology her major field. At Marburg (1924–1926) she studied classical languages, German literature, Protestant theology with Rudolf Bultmann and philosophy with Nicolai Hartmann and Heidegger. She arrived in the fall in the middle of an intellectual revolution led by the young Heidegger, of whom she was in awe, describing him as "the hidden king [who] reigned in the realm of thinking".

Heidegger had broken away from the intellectual movement started by Edmund Husserl, whose assistant he had been at University of Freiburg before coming to Marburg. This was a period when Heidegger was preparing his lectures on Kant, which he would develop in the second part of his Sein und Zeit (Being and Time) in 1927 and Kant und das Problem der Metaphysik (1929). In his classes, he and his students struggled with the meaning of "Being" as they studied Aristotle's and Plato's Sophist concept of truth, to which Heidegger opposed the pre-Socratic term ἀλήθεια. Many years later Arendt would describe these classes, how people came to Marburg to hear him, and how, above all he imparted the idea of Denken ("thinking") as activity, which she qualified as "passionate thinking".

Arendt was restless, finding her studies neither emotionally nor intellectually satisfying. She was ready for passion, finishing her poem Trost (Consolation, 1923) with the lines:

Die Stunden verrinnen,
Die Tage vergehen,
Es bleibt ein Gewinnen
Das bloße Bestehen.
(The hours run down.
The days pass on.
One achievement remains:
merely existing.)

Her encounter with Heidegger represented a dramatic departure from the past. He was handsome, a genius, romantic, and taught that thinking and "aliveness" were but one. The 18-year-old Arendt then began a long romantic relationship with the 35-year-old Heidegger, who was married with two young sons. (Note: Martin Heidegger, a Roman Catholic, had married Elfride Petri on 21 March 1917. They had two sons, Jorg and Hermann) Arendt later faced criticism for this because of Heidegger's support for the Nazi Party after his election as rector at Freiburg University in 1933. Nevertheless, he remained one of the most profound influences on her thinking, and he would later relate that she had been the inspiration for his work on passionate thinking in those days. They agreed to keep the details of the relationship a secret while preserving their letters. The relationship was unknown until Elisabeth Young-Bruehl's biography of Arendt appeared in 1982. At the time of publishing, Arendt and Heidegger were deceased but Heidegger's wife, Elfride, was still alive. The affair was not well known until 1995, when Elzbieta Ettinger gained access to the sealed correspondence and published a controversial account that was used by Arendt's detractors to cast doubt on her integrity. That account, (Note: Ettinger set out to write a biography of Arendt, but, being in poor health, never completed it, only this chapter being published as a separate work before she died) which caused a scandal, was subsequently refuted.

At Marburg, Arendt lived at Lutherstraße 4. Among her friends was Hans Jonas, a Jewish classmate. Another fellow student of Heidegger's was Jonas' friend, the Jewish philosopher Günther Siegmund Stern, who would later become her first husband. Stern had completed his doctoral dissertation with Edmund Husserl at Freiburg, and was now working on his Habilitation thesis with Heidegger, but Arendt, involved with Heidegger, took little notice of him at the time.

====== Die Schatten (1925) ======
In the summer of 1925, while home at Königsberg, Arendt composed her sole autobiographical piece, Die Schatten (The Shadows), a "description of herself" addressed to Heidegger. (Note: The essay is preserved in the published correspondence between Arendt and Heidegger) In this essay, full of anguish and Heideggerian language, she reveals her feelings toward her femininity and Jewishness, writing abstractly in the third person. (Note: for instance "perhaps her youth will free itself from this spell") She describes a state of "Fremdheit" (alienation), on the one hand an abrupt loss of youth and innocence, on the other an "Absonderlichkeit" (strangeness), the finding of the remarkable in the banal. In her detailing of the pain of her childhood and longing for protection she shows her vulnerabilities and how her love for Heidegger had released her and once again filled her world with color and mystery. She refers to her relationship with Heidegger as "Eine starre Hingegebenheit an ein Einziges" ("an unbending devotion to a unique man"). This period of intense introspection was also one of the most productive of her poetic output, such as In sich versunken (Lost in Self-Contemplation).

Teachers

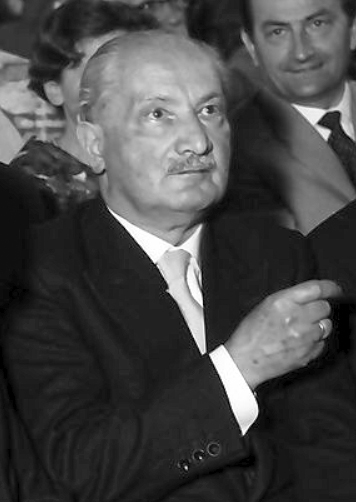
Martin Heidegger

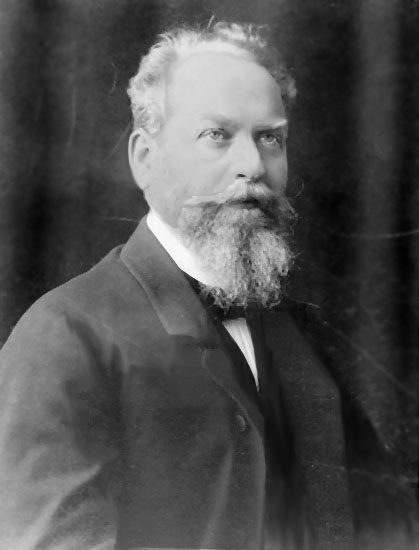
Edmund Husserl

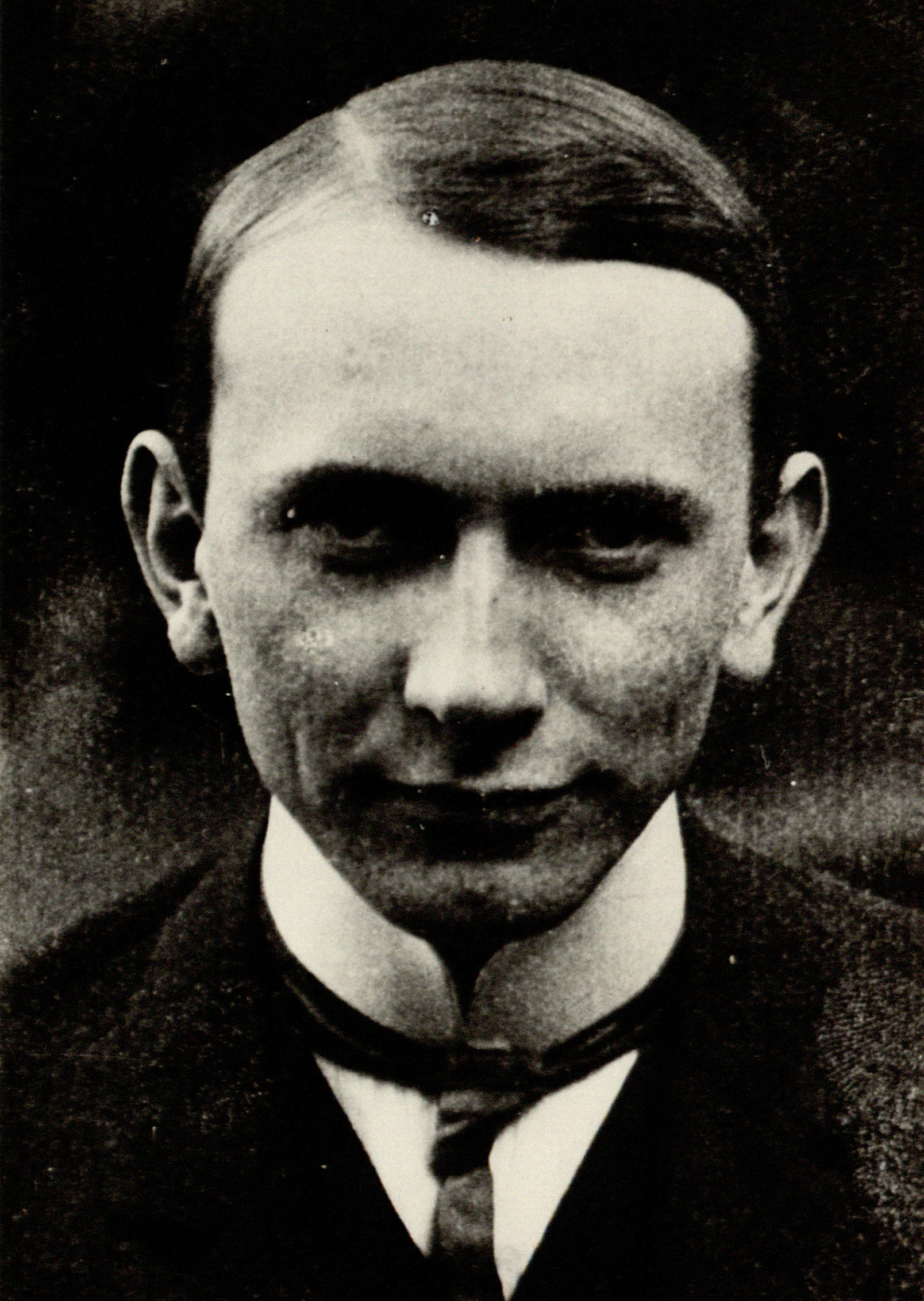
Karl Jaspers

===== Freiburg and Heidelberg (1926–1929) =====
After a year at Marburg, Arendt spent a semester at Freiburg, attending the lectures of Husserl. In 1926 she moved to the University of Heidelberg, completing her dissertation in 1928 under Karl Jaspers. She received her Ph.D. summa cum laude that year. Jaspers, a friend of Heidegger, was the other leading figure of the then-new and revolutionary Existenzphilosophie. Her thesis was entitled Der Liebesbegriff bei Augustin: Versuch einer philosophischen Interpretation (On the concept of love in the thought of Saint Augustine: Attempt at a philosophical interpretation). She remained a lifelong friend of Jaspers and his wife, Gertrud Mayer, developing a deep intellectual relationship with him. At Heidelberg, her circle of friends included Hans Jonas, who had also moved from Marburg to study Augustine, working on his Augustin und das paulinische Freiheitsproblem. Ein philosophischer Beitrag zur Genesis der christlich-abendländischen Freiheitsidee (1930), (Note: Augustin and the Pauline freedom problem. A philosophical contribution to the genesis of the Christian-Western idea of freedom) and also a group of three young philosophers: Karl Frankenstein, Erich Neumann and Erwin Loewenson. Other friends and students of Jaspers were the linguists Benno von Wiese and Hugo Friedrich (seen with Hannah, below), with whom she attended lectures by Friedrich Gundolf at Jaspers' suggestion and who kindled in her an interest in German Romanticism. She also became reacquainted, at a lecture, with Kurt Blumenfeld, who introduced her to Jewish politics. At Heidelberg, she lived in the old town (Altstadt) near the castle, at Schlossberg 16. The house was demolished in the 1960s, but the one remaining wall bears a plaque commemorating her time there. At Heidelberg, Arendt met a number of Japanese students including Kitayama Junyu who translated her into Japanese in 1930.

Arendt at Heidelberg 1926–1929

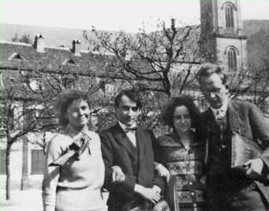
Hannah Arendt (2nd from right), Benno von Wiese (far right), Hugo Friedrich (2nd from left) and friend at Heidelberg University 1928

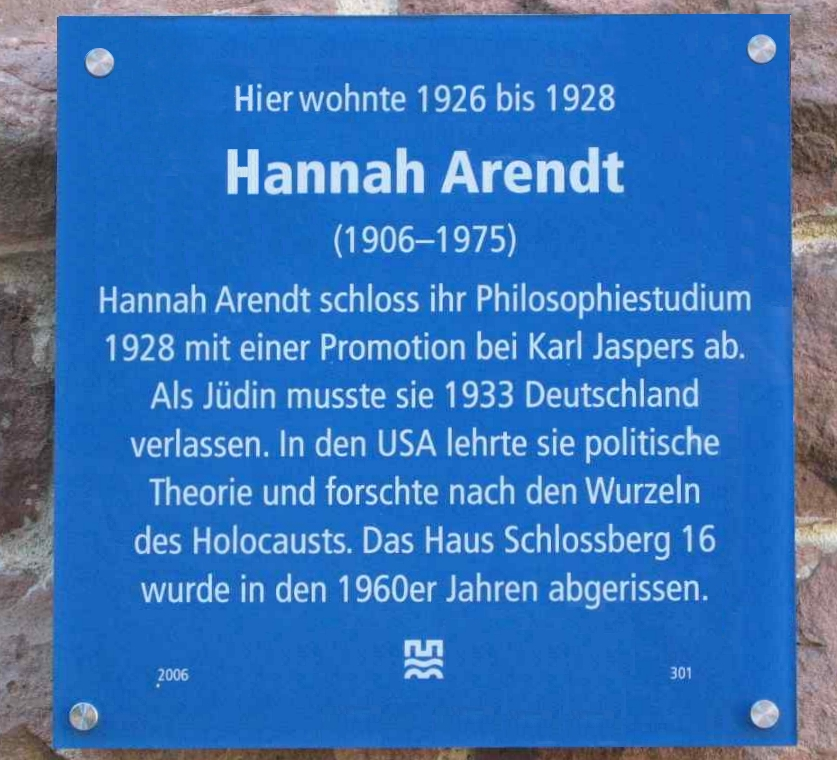
Plaque marking Arendt's residence in Heidelberg

On completing her dissertation, Arendt turned to her Habilitationsschrift, initially on German Romanticism, and thereafter an academic teaching career. However 1929 was also the year of the Depression and the end of the golden years (Goldene Zwanziger) of the Weimar Republic, which was to become increasingly unstable over its remaining four years. Arendt, as a Jew, had little if any chance of obtaining an academic appointment in Germany. Nevertheless, she completed most of the work before she was forced to leave Germany.

== Career ==
=== Germany (1929–1933) ===
==== Berlin-Potsdam (1929) ====
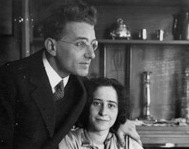
Günther Stern and Hannah Arendt in 1929

In 1929, Arendt met Günther Stern again, this time in Berlin at a New Year's masked ball, and began a relationship with him. (Note: "I won Hannah's heart at a ball, whilst dancing: I remarked that "love is the act in which one transforms an a posteriori, the other person one has encountered by coincidence – into the a priori of one's own life." – This pretty formula did admittedly not turn out to be true.") Within a month she had moved in with him in a one-room studio, shared with a dancing school in Berlin-Halensee. Then they moved to Merkurstraße 3, Nowawes, in Potsdam and were married there on 26 September. (Note: Extramarital cohabitation was not unusual amongst Berlin intelligentsia, but would be considered scandalous in provincial university communities, necessitating their marriage before moving to Heidelberg and Frankfurt to pursue Günther's academic aspirations.) They had much in common and the marriage was welcomed by both sets of parents. In the summer, Hannah Arendt successfully applied to the Notgemeinschaft der Deutschen Wissenschaft for a grant to support her Habilitation, which was supported by Heidegger and Jaspers among others, and in the meantime, with Günther's help was working on revisions to get her dissertation published.

==== Wanderjahre (1929–1931) ====
After Arendt and Stern were married, they began two years of what Christian Dries refers to as the Wanderjahre (years of wandering) with the ultimately fruitless aim of having Stern accepted for an academic appointment. They lived for a while in Drewitz, a southern neighborhood of Potsdam, before moving to Heidelberg, where they lived with the Jaspers. After Heidelberg, where Stern completed the first draft of his Habilitation thesis, the two then moved to Frankfurt where Stern hoped to finish his writing. There, Arendt participated in the university's intellectual life, attending lectures by Karl Mannheim and Paul Tillich, among others. The couple collaborated intellectually, writing an article together on Rilke's Duino Elegies (1923) and both reviewing Mannheim's Ideologie und Utopie (1929). The latter was Arendt's sole contribution to sociology. In both her treatment of Mannheim and Rilke, Arendt found love to be a transcendent principle "Because there is no true transcendence in this ordered world, one also cannot exceed the world, but only succeed to higher ranks". (Note: Da es nun wahre Transzendenz in dieser geordneten Welt nicht gibt, gibt es auch nicht wahre Übersteigung, sondern nur Aufsteigen in andere Ränge) In Rilke she saw a latter day secular Augustine, describing the Elegies as the letzten literarischen Form religiösen Dokumentes (ultimate form of religious document). Later, she would discover the limitations of transcendent love in explaining the historical events that pushed her into political action. Another theme from Rilke that she would develop was the despair of not being heard. Reflecting on Rilke's opening lines, which she placed as an epigram at the beginning of their essay

Wer, wenn ich schriee, hörte mich denn aus der Engel Ordnungen?
(Who, if I cried out, would hear me among the angelic orders?)

Arendt and Stern begin by stating:

The paradoxical, ambiguous, and desperate situation from which standpoint the Duino Elegies may alone be understood has two characteristics: the absence of an echo and the knowledge of futility. The conscious renunciation of the demand to be heard, the despair at not being able to be heard, and finally the need to speak even without an answer–these are the real reasons for the darkness, asperity, and tension of the style in which poetry indicates its own possibilities and its will to form (Note: Echolosigkeit und das Wissen um die Vergeblichkeit ist die paradoxe, zweideutige und verzweifelte Situation, aus der allein die Duineser Elegien zu verstehen sind. Dieser bewußte Verzicht auf Gehörtwerden, diese Verzweiflung, nicht gehört werden zu können, schließlich der Wortzwang ohne Antwort ist der eigentliche Grund der Dunkelheit, Abruptheit und Überspanntheit des Stiles, in dem die Dichtung ihre eigenen Möglichkeiten und ihren Willen zur Form aufgibt.)

Arendt also published an article on Augustine (354–430) in the Frankfurter Zeitung to mark the 1500th anniversary of his death. She saw this article as forming a bridge between her treatment of Augustine in her dissertation and her subsequent work on Romanticism. When it became evident Stern would not succeed in obtaining an appointment, (Note: Stern was advised that employment at a university was unlikely due to the rising power of the Nazis, adding: "Now it's the turn of the Nazis for a year or little more. After they fail, we'll give you the habilitation" ("Jetzt kommen erst einmal die Nazis dran für ein Jahr oder so. Wenn die dann abgewirtschaftet haben, werden wir Sie habilitieren").) the Sterns returned to Berlin in 1931.

==== Return to Berlin (1931–1933) ====
In Berlin, where the couple initially lived in the predominantly Jewish area of Bayerisches Viertel (Bavarian Quarter or "Jewish Switzerland") in Schöneberg, Stern obtained a position as a staff-writer for the cultural supplement of the Berliner Börsen-Courier, edited by Herbert Ihering, with the help of Bertold Brecht. There he started writing using the pen name Günther Anders, i.e. "Günther Other". (Note: There are a number of theories as to his reason for adopting the pen name Anders, including Herbert Ihering's that there were too many writers called Stern, so he chose something "different" (anders); its sounding less Jewish,; and not wanting to be seen as the son of his famous father.) Arendt assisted Günther with his work, but the shadow of Heidegger hung over their relationship. While Günther was working on his Habilitationsschrift, Arendt had abandoned the original subject of German Romanticism for her thesis in 1930, and turned instead to Rahel Varnhagen and the question of assimilation. Anne Mendelssohn had accidentally acquired a copy of Varnhagen's correspondence and excitedly introduced her to Arendt, donating her collection to her. A little later, Arendt's work on Romanticism led her to a study of Jewish salons and eventually to those of Varnhagen. In Rahel, she found qualities she felt reflected her own, particularly those of sensibility and vulnerability. Rahel, like Hannah, found her destiny in her Jewishness. Hannah Arendt would come to call Rahel Varnhagen's discovery of living with her destiny as being a "conscious pariah". This was a personal trait that Arendt had recognized in herself, although she did not embrace the term until later.

Back in Berlin, Arendt found herself becoming more involved in politics and started studying political theory, and reading Marx and Trotsky, while developing contacts at the Deutsche Hochschule für Politik. Despite the political leanings of her mother and husband she never saw herself as a political leftist, justifying her activism as being through her Jewishness. Her increasing interest in Jewish politics and her examination of assimilation in her study of Varnhagen led her to publish her first article on Judaism, Aufklärung und Judenfrage ("The Enlightenment and the Jewish Question", 1932). Blumenfeld had introduced her to the "Jewish question", which would be his lifelong concern. Meanwhile, her views on German Romanticism were evolving. She wrote a review of Hans Weil's Die Entstehung des deutschen Bildungsprinzips (The Origin of German Educational Principle, 1930), which dealt with the emergence of Bildungselite (educational elite) in the time of Rahel Varnhagen.

At the same time she began to be occupied by Max Weber's description of the status of Jewish people within a state as Pariavolk (pariah people) in his Wirtschaft und Gesellschaft (1922), while borrowing Bernard Lazare's term paria conscient (conscious pariah) with which she identified. (Note: Pariavolk: In Religionssoziologie (The Sociology of Religion). While Arendt based her work on Weber, a number of earlier authors had also used this term, including Theodor Herzl.) In both these articles she advanced the views of Johann Herder. Another interest of hers at the time was the status of women, resulting in her 1932 review of Alice Rühle-Gerstel's book Das Frauenproblem in der Gegenwart. Eine psychologische Bilanz (Contemporary Women's Issues: A psychological balance sheet). Although not a supporter of the women's movement, the review was sympathetic. At least in terms of the status of women at that time, she was skeptical of the movement's ability to achieve political change. She was also critical of the movement, because it was a women's movement, rather than contributing with men to a political movement, and abstract rather than striving for concrete goals. In this manner she echoed Rosa Luxemburg. Like Luxemburg, she would later criticize Jewish movements for the same reason. Arendt consistently prioritized political over social questions.

By 1932, faced with a deteriorating political situation, Arendt was deeply troubled by reports that Heidegger was speaking at National Socialist meetings. She wrote, asking him to deny that he was attracted to National Socialism. Heidegger replied that he did not seek to deny the rumors (which were true), and merely assured her that his feelings for her were unchanged. As a Jew in Nazi Germany, Arendt was prevented from making a living and discriminated against and confided to Anne Mendelssohn that emigration was probably inevitable. Jaspers had tried to persuade her to consider herself as a German first, a position she distanced herself from, pointing out that she was a Jew and that "Für mich ist Deutschland die Muttersprache, die Philosophie und die Dichtung" (For me, Germany is the mother tongue, philosophy and poetry), rather than her identity.

By 1933, life for the Jewish population in Germany was becoming precarious. Adolf Hitler became Reichskanzler (Chancellor) in January, and the Reichstag was burned down (Reichstagsbrand) the following month. This led to the suspension of civil liberties, with attacks on the left, and, in particular, members of the Kommunistische Partei Deutschlands (German Communist Party: KPD). Stern, who had communist associations, fled to Paris, but Arendt stayed on to become an activist. Knowing her time was limited, she used the apartment at Opitzstraße 6 in Berlin-Steglitz that she had occupied with Stern since 1932 as an underground railway way-station for fugitives. Her rescue operation there is now recognized with a plaque on the wall.

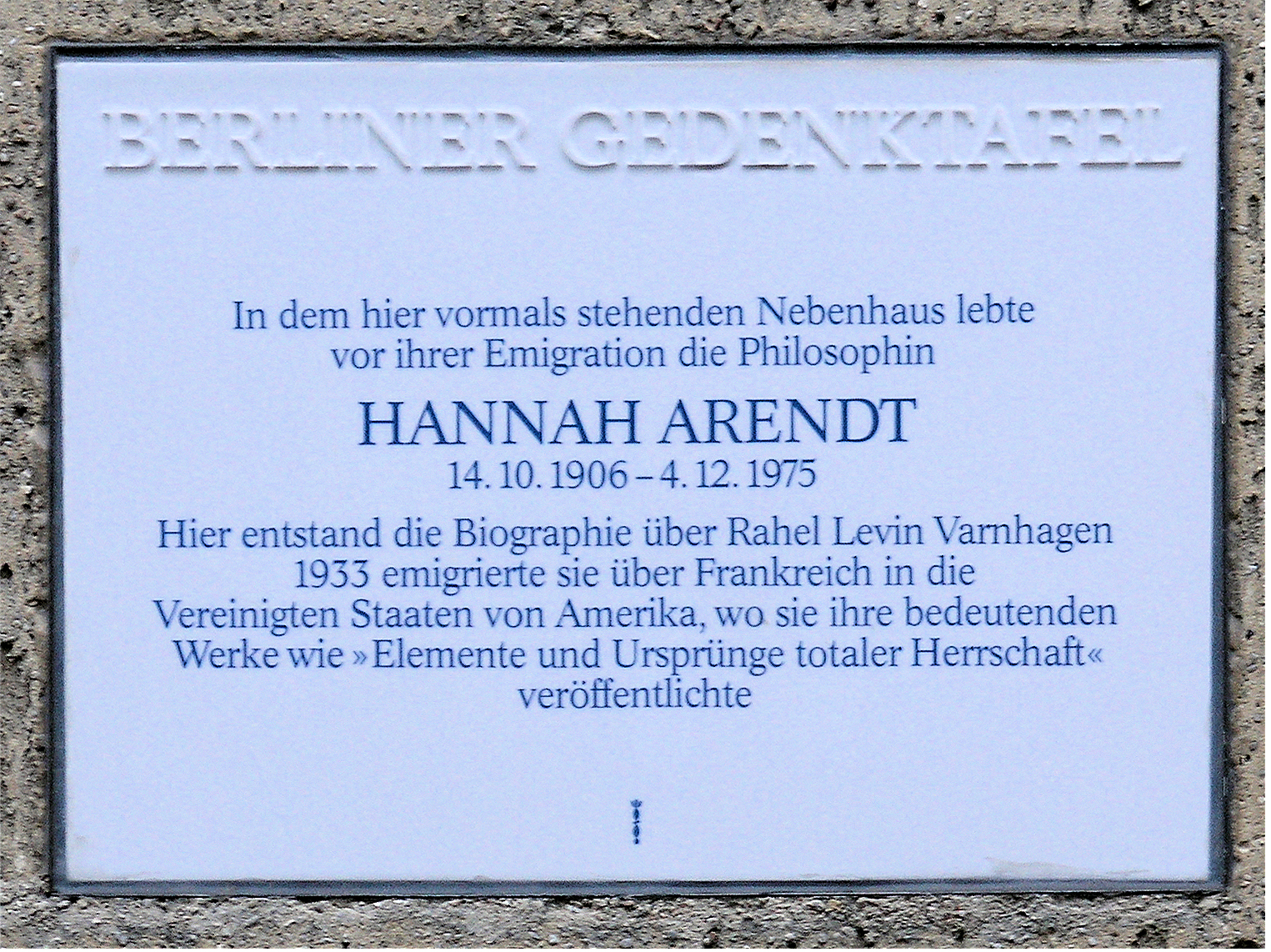
Memorial at Opitzstraße 6

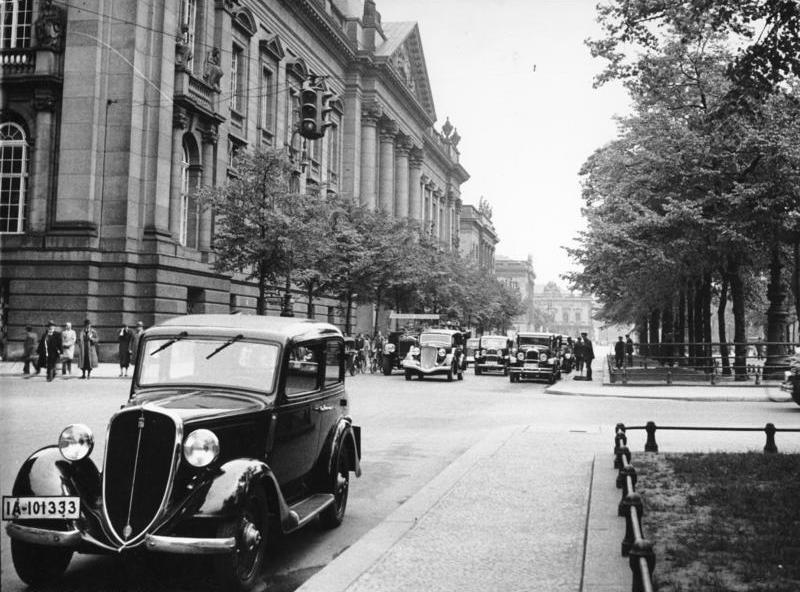
Prussian State Library 1939

Arendt had already positioned herself as a critic of the rising Nazi Party in 1932 by publishing "Adam-Müller-Renaissance?" a critique of the appropriation of the life of Adam Müller to support right wing ideology. The beginnings of anti-Jewish laws and boycott came in the spring of 1933. Confronted with systemic antisemitism, Arendt adopted the motiv "If one is attacked as a Jew one must defend oneself as a Jew. Not as a German, not as a world citizen, not as an upholder of the Rights of Man." This was Arendt's introduction of the concept of Jew as Pariah that would occupy her for the rest of her life in her Jewish writings. She took a public position by publishing part of her largely completed biography of Rahel Varnhagen as "Originale Assimilation: Ein Nachwort zu Rahel Varnhagen 100 Todestag" ("Original Assimilation: An Epilogue to the One Hundredth Anniversary of Rahel Varnhagen's Death") in the Kölnische Zeitung on 7 March 1933 and a little later also in Jüdische Rundschau. (Note: "Original Assimilation" was first published in English in 2007, as part of the collection Jewish Writings.) In the article she argues that the age of assimilation that began with Varnhagen's generation had come to an end with an official state policy of antisemitism. She opened with the declaration:

Today in Germany it seems Jewish assimilation must declare its bankruptcy. The general social antisemitism and its official legitimation affects in the first instance assimilated Jews, who can no longer protect themselves through baptism or by emphasizing their differences from Eastern Judaism. (Note: "Die jüdische Assimilation scheint heute in Deutschland ihren Bankrott anmelden zu müssen. Der allgemein gesellschaftliche und offiziell legitimierte Antisemitismus trifft in erster Linie das assimilierte Judentum, das sich nicht mehr durch Taufe und nicht mehr durch betonte Distanz zum Ostjudentum entlasten kann.")

As a Jew, Arendt was anxious to inform the world of what was happening to her people in 1930–1933. She surrounded herself with Zionist activists, including Kurt Blumenfeld, Martin Buber and Salman Schocken, and started to research antisemitism. Arendt had access to the Prussian State Library for her work on Varnhagen. Blumenfeld's Zionistische Vereinigung für Deutschland (Zionist Federation of Germany) persuaded her to use this access to obtain evidence of the extent of antisemitism, for a planned speech to the Zionist Congress in Prague. This research was illegal at the time. Her actions led to her being denounced by a librarian for anti-state propaganda, resulting in the arrest of both Arendt and her mother by the Gestapo. They served eight days in prison but her notebooks were in code and could not be deciphered, and she was released by a young, sympathetic arresting officer to await trial. This incident is the subject of the play Mrs. Stern Wanders the Prussian State Library, by Jenny Lyn Bader, which premiered in 2019 in West Orange, New Jersey.

=== Exile: France (1933–1941) ===
==== Paris (1933–1940) ====
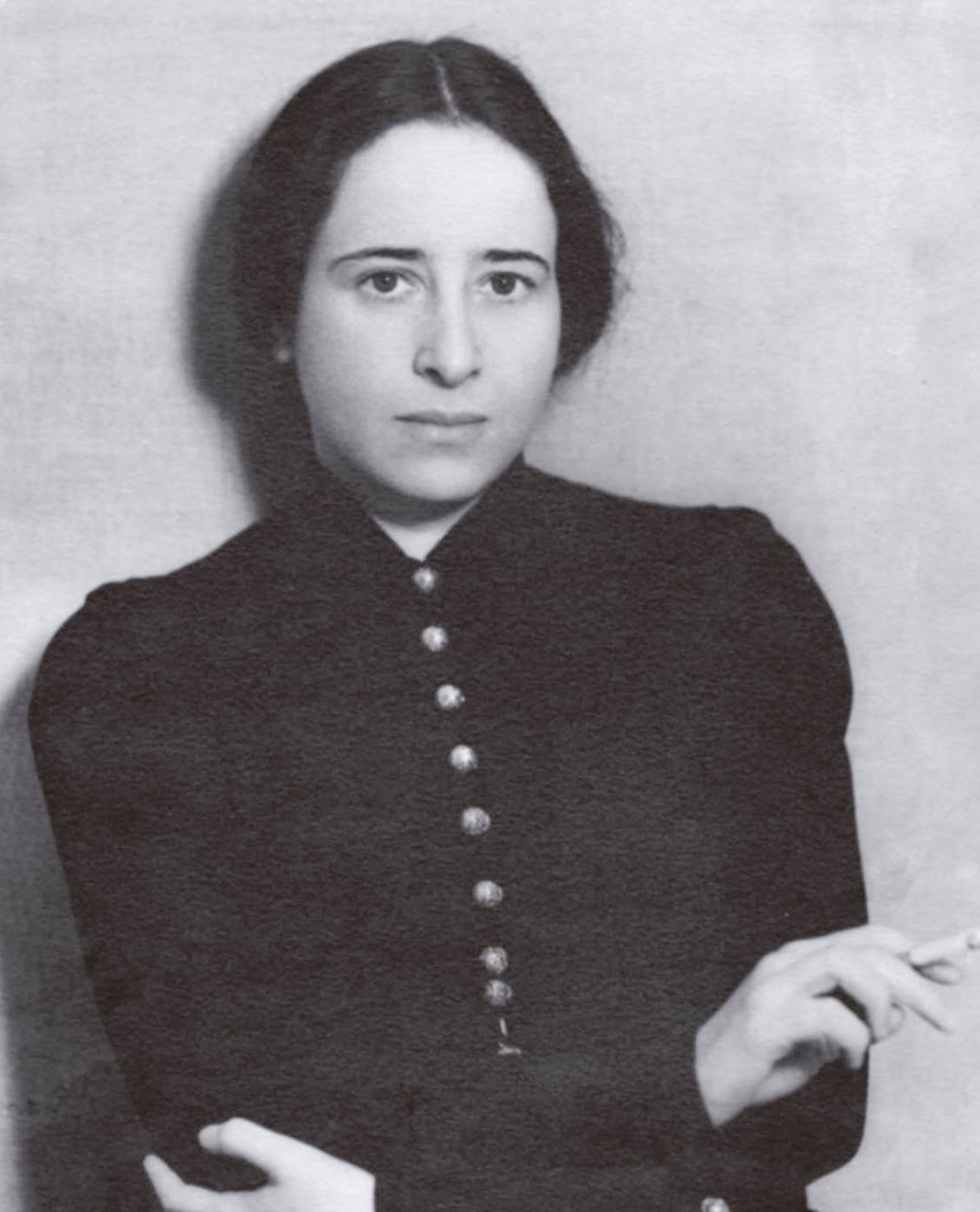
Arendt in 1933

On their release, realizing the danger she was now in, Arendt and her mother fled Germany following the established escape route over the Ore Mountains by night into Czechoslovakia and on to Prague and then by train to Geneva. In Geneva, she made a conscious decision to commit herself to "the Jewish cause". She obtained work with a friend of her mother's at the League of Nations' Jewish Agency for Palestine, distributing visas and writing speeches.

From Geneva the Arendts traveled to Paris in the autumn, where she was reunited with Stern, joining a stream of refugees. While Arendt had left Germany without papers, her mother had travel documents and returned to Königsberg and her husband. In Paris, she befriended Stern's cousin, the Marxist literary critic and philosopher Walter Benjamin and also the Jewish French philosopher Raymond Aron.

Arendt was now an émigrée, an exile, stateless, without papers, and had turned her back on the Germany and Germans of the Nazizeit. Her legal status was precarious and she was coping with a foreign language and culture, all of which took its toll on her mentally and physically. In 1934 she started working for the Zionist-funded outreach program Agriculture et Artisanat, giving lectures and organizing clothing, documents, medications and education for Jewish youth seeking to emigrate to the British Mandate of Palestine, mainly as agricultural workers. Initially she was employed as a secretary, and then office manager. To improve her skills she studied French, Hebrew, and Yiddish. In this way she was able to support herself and her husband. When the organization closed in 1935, her work for Blumenfeld and the Zionists in Germany brought her into contact with the wealthy philanthropist Baroness Germaine Alice de Rothschild (born Halphen, 1884–1975), wife of Édouard Alphonse James de Rothschild, becoming her assistant. In this position she oversaw the baroness' contributions to Jewish charities through the Paris Consistoire, although she had little time for the family as a whole. (Note: The Rothschilds had headed the central Consistoire for a century but stood for everything Arendt did not, opposing immigration and any connection with German Jewry.)

Later in 1935, Arendt joined Youth Aliyah (Youth immigration), (Note: Youth Aliyah, literally Youth Immigration, reflecting the fundamental Zionist tenet of "going up" to Jerusalem) an organization similar to Agriculture et Artisanat that was founded in Berlin on the day Hitler seized power. It was affiliated with Hadassah, which later saved many from the Holocaust, and there Arendt eventually became Secretary-General (1935–1939). Her work with Youth Aliyah also involved finding food, clothing, social workers, and lawyers, but above all, fund raising. She made her first visit to the British Mandate of Palestine in 1935, accompanying one of these groups and meeting with her cousin Ernst Fürst there. (Note: Hannah Arendt's mother, Martha Arendt (born Cohn) had a sister Margarethe Fürst in Berlin, with whom the Arendts sought refuge for a while during World War I. Margarethe's son Ernst (Hannah Arendt's cousin) married Hannah's childhood friend Käthe Lewin, and they emigrated to Mandatory Palestine in 1934. There, their first daughter was named Hannah after Arendt ("Big Hannah"). Their second daughter, Edna Fürst (b. 1943), later married Michael Brocke and accompanied her great aunt Hannah Arendt at the Eichmann trial) With the Nazi annexation of Austria and invasion of Czechoslovakia in 1938, Paris was flooded with refugees, and she became the special agent for the rescue of the children from those countries. In 1938, Arendt completed her biography of Rahel Varnhagen, although this was not published until 1957. In April 1939, following the devastating Kristallnacht pogrom of November 1938, Martha Beerwald realized her daughter would not return and made the decision to leave her husband and join Arendt in Paris. One stepdaughter had died and the other had moved to England, Martin Beerwald would not leave and she no longer had any close ties to Königsberg.

===== Heinrich Blücher =====
In 1936, Arendt met the self-educated Berlin poet and Marxist philosopher Heinrich Blücher in Paris. Blücher had been a Spartacist and then a founding member of the KPD, but had been expelled due to his work in the Versöhnler (Conciliator faction). Although Arendt had rejoined Stern in 1933, their marriage existed in name only, with their having separated in Berlin. (Note: Arendt/Heidegger: Arendt confided to Heidegger's wife Elfride in a letter dated 10 February 1950, that when she left Marburg she was absolutely resolved never to love a man again, "And then I got married, just to get married, to a man I didn't love". Arendt goes on to say that she felt absolutely superior to things, that she believed she could have everything at her disposal, precisely because she expected nothing for herself. Finally she said that everything changed only when she met the man who would become her second husband.) She fulfilled her social obligations and used the name Hannah Stern, but the relationship effectively ended when Stern, perhaps recognizing the danger better than she, emigrated to America with his parents in 1936. In 1937, Arendt was stripped of her German citizenship and she and Stern divorced. She had begun seeing more of Blücher, and eventually they began living together. It was Blücher's long political activism that began to move Arendt's thinking toward political action. Arendt and Blücher married on 16 January 1940, shortly after their divorces were finalized.

==== Internment and escape (1940–1941) ====
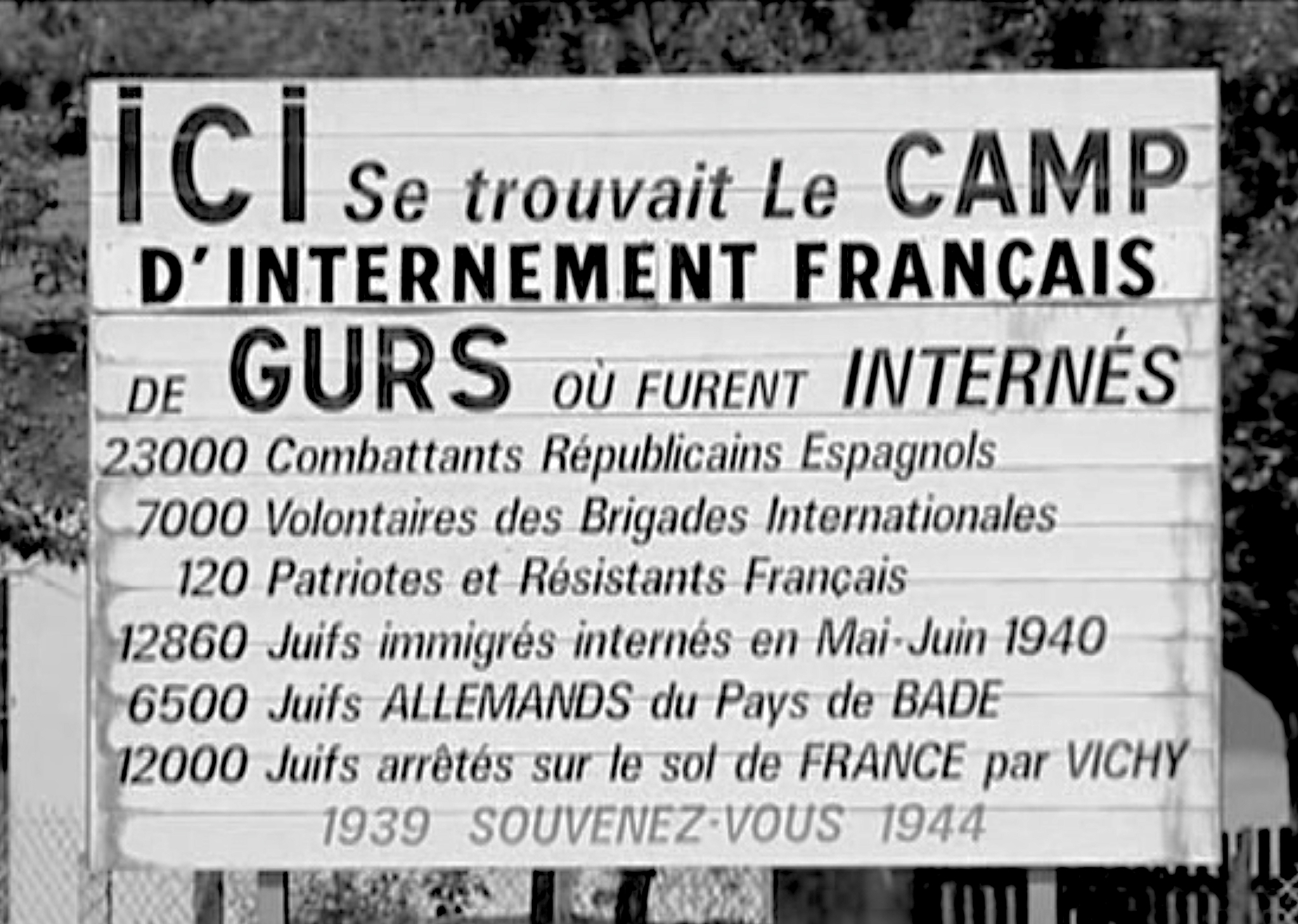
Memorial at Camp Gurs

On 5 May 1940, in anticipation of the German invasion of France and the Low Countries that month, the military governor of Paris issued a proclamation ordering all "enemy aliens" between 17 and 55 who had come from Germany (predominantly Jews) to report separately for internment. The women were gathered together in the Vélodrome d'Hiver on 15 May, so Hannah Arendt's mother, being older than 55, was allowed to stay in Paris. Arendt described the process of making refugees as "the new type of human being created by contemporary history ... put into concentration camps by their foes and into internment camps by their friends". The men, including Blücher, were sent to Camp Vernet in southern France, close to the Spanish border. Arendt and the other women were sent to Camp Gurs, to the west of Gurs, a week later. The camp had earlier been set up to accommodate refugees from Spain. On 22 June, France capitulated and signed the Compiègne armistice, dividing the country. Gurs was in the southern Vichy controlled section. Arendt describes how, "in the resulting chaos we succeeded in getting hold of liberation papers with which we were able to leave the camp", which she did with approximately 200 of the 7,000 women held there, about four weeks later. There was no Résistance then, but she managed to walk and hitchhike north to Montauban, (Note: Gurs to Montauban, about 300 km) near Toulouse where she knew she would find help.

Montauban had become an unofficial capital for former detainees, (Note: The Huguenot mayor of Montauban had made welcoming political refugees an official policy) and Arendt's friend Lotta Sempell Klembort was staying there. Blücher's camp had been evacuated in the wake of the German advance, and he managed to escape from a forced march, making his way to Montauban, where the two of them led a fugitive life. Soon they were joined by Anne Mendelssohn and Arendt's mother. Escape from France was extremely difficult without official papers; their friend Walter Benjamin had taken his own life, fearing that he would be apprehended trying to escape to Spain. One of the best-known illegal routes operated out of Marseille, where Varian Fry, an American journalist, worked to raise funds, forge papers, and bribe officials with Hiram Bingham, the American vice-consul there.

Fry and Bingham secured exit papers and American visas for thousands, and with help from Günther Stern, Arendt, her husband, and her mother managed to secure the requisite permits to travel by train in January 1941 through Spain to Lisbon, Portugal, where they rented a flat at Rua da Sociedade Farmacêutica, 6b. (Note: In December 2018, a plaque to recognize Arendt's stay in Lisbon was unveiled at the corner of Rua da Sociedade Farmacêutica and Conde Redondo, including a quotation from "We Refugees" (see image)) They eventually secured passage to New York in May on the Companhia Colonial de Navegação's S/S Guiné II. A few months later, Fry's operations were shut down and the borders sealed.

=== New York (1941–1975) ===
==== World War II (1941–1945) ====
Upon arriving in New York City on 22 May 1941 with very little, Hannah's family received assistance from the Zionist Organization of America and the local German immigrant population, including Paul Tillich and neighbors from Königsberg. They rented rooms at 317 West 95th Street and Martha Arendt joined them there in June. There was an urgent need to acquire English, and it was decided that Hannah Arendt should spend two months with an American family in Winchester, Massachusetts, through Self-Help for Refugees, in July. She found the experience difficult but formulated her early appraisal of American life, Der Grundwiderspruch des Landes ist politische Freiheit bei gesellschaftlicher Knechtschaft (The fundamental contradiction of the country is political freedom coupled with social slavery). (Note: Arendt to Jaspers 29 January 1946)

On returning to New York, Arendt was anxious to resume writing and became active in the German-Jewish community, publishing her first article, "From the Dreyfus Affair to France Today" (in translation from her German) in July 1941. (Note: Arguing that anti-semitism in France was a continuum from Dreyfus to Pétain) While she was working on this article, she was looking for employment and in November 1941 was hired by the New York German-language Jewish newspaper Aufbau and from 1941 to 1945, she wrote a political column for it, covering antisemitism, refugees and the need for a Jewish army. She also contributed to the Menorah Journal, a Jewish-American magazine, and other German émigré publications.

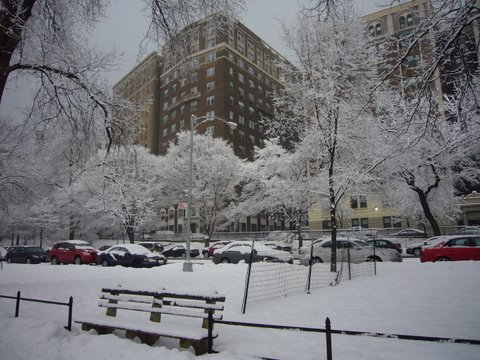
Arendt and Blücher were residents at 370 Riverside Drive in New York City.

Arendt's first full-time salaried job came in 1944, when she became the director of research and executive director for the newly emerging Commission on European Jewish Cultural Reconstruction, a project of the Conference on Jewish Relations. (Note: The Conference on Jewish Relations, established in 1933 by Salo Baron and Morris Raphael Cohen was renamed the Conference on Jewish Social Studies in 1955, and began publishing Jewish Social Studies in 1939) She was recruited "because of her great interest in the Commission's activities, her previous experience as an administrator, and her connections with Germany". There she compiled lists of Jewish cultural assets in Germany and Nazi occupied Europe, to aid in their recovery after the war. Together with her husband, she lived at 370 Riverside Drive in New York City and at Kingston, New York, where Blücher taught at nearby Bard College for many years.

==== Post-war (1945–1975) ====
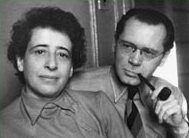
Hannah Arendt with Heinrich Blücher, New York 1950

In July 1946, Arendt left her position at the Commission on European Jewish Cultural Reconstruction to become an editor at Schocken Books, which later published some of her works. In 1948, she became engaged with the campaign of Judah Magnes for a solution to the Israeli–Palestinian conflict. She famously opposed the establishment of a Jewish nation-state in Palestine and initially also opposed the establishment of a binational Arab-Jewish state. Instead, she advocated for the inclusion of Palestine into a multi-ethnic federation. Only in 1948 in an effort to forestall partition did she support a binational one-state solution. She returned to the Commission in August 1949. In her capacity as executive secretary, she traveled to Europe, where she worked in Germany, Britain, and France (December 1949 to March 1950) to negotiate the return of archival material from German institutions, an experience she found frustrating, but provided regular field reports. In January 1952, she became secretary to the Board, although the work of the organization was winding down (Note: The Commission, by then called Jewish Cultural Reconstruction (JCR), was largely the work of Hannah Arendt and Salo Baron) and she was simultaneously pursuing her own intellectual activities; she retained this position until her death. (Note: JCR was wound up in 1977) Arendt's work on cultural restitution provided further material for her study of totalitarianism.

In the 1950s Arendt published The Origins of Totalitarianism (1951) and The Human Condition (1958), followed by On Revolution (1963). Arendt became a naturalized citizen of the United States on 10 December 1951. Arendt had begun corresponding with the American author Mary McCarthy, six years her junior, in 1950 and they soon became lifelong friends. She had started seeing Martin Heidegger again, and had what the American writer Adam Kirsch called a "quasi-romance", lasting for two years, with the man who had previously been her mentor, teacher, and lover. During this time, Arendt defended him against critics who noted his enthusiastic membership in the Nazi Party. She portrayed Heidegger as a naïve man swept up by forces beyond his control, and pointed out that Heidegger's philosophy had nothing to do with National Socialism. She suspected that loyal followers of Horkheimer and Adorno in Frankfurt were plotting against Heidegger. For Adorno she had a real aversion: "Half a Jew and one of the most repugnant men I know". According to Arendt, the Frankfurt School was willing, and quite able, to destroy Heidegger: "For years they have branded anti-Semitism on anyone in Germany who opposes them, or have threatened to raise such an accusation".

In 1961 she traveled to Jerusalem to report on Eichmann's trial for The New Yorker. This report strongly influenced her popular recognition, and raised much controversy (see below). Her work was recognized by many awards, including the Danish Sonning Prize in 1975 for Contributions to European Civilization.

A few years later she spoke in New York City on the legitimacy of violence as a political act: "Generally speaking, violence always rises out of impotence. It is the hope of those who have no power to find a substitute for it and this hope, I think, is in vain. Violence can destroy power, but it can never replace it."

===== Teaching =====
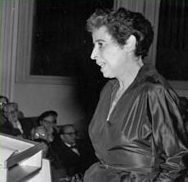
Hannah Arendt lecturing in Germany, 1955

Arendt taught at many institutions of higher learning from 1951 onward, but, preserving her independence, consistently refused tenure-track positions. She was a visiting scholar at Princeton University (where she was the first woman to be appointed a full professor in 1959), University of California at Berkeley, Columbia University, Northwestern University, and Cornell University. She also taught at the University of Chicago from 1963 to 1967, where she was a member of the Committee on Social Thought; Yale University, where she was a fellow; and the Center for Advanced Studies at Wesleyan University (1961–62, 1962–63). From 1967, she was a professor at The New School for Social Research in Manhattan, New York City.

She was elected a fellow of the American Academy of Arts and Sciences in 1962 and a member of the American Academy of Arts and Letters in 1964. The American Academy of Arts and Sciences awarded her the Emerson-Thoreau Medal for distinguished achievement in literature in 1969 and she also received a dozen honorary degrees from American universities, including a doctor of laws from Yale. In 1974, Arendt was instrumental in the creation of Structured Liberal Education (SLE) at Stanford University. She wrote a letter to the president of Stanford to persuade the university to enact Stanford history professor Mark Mancall's vision of a residentially-based humanities program. At the time of her death, she was University Professor of Political Philosophy at The New School.

== Relationships ==
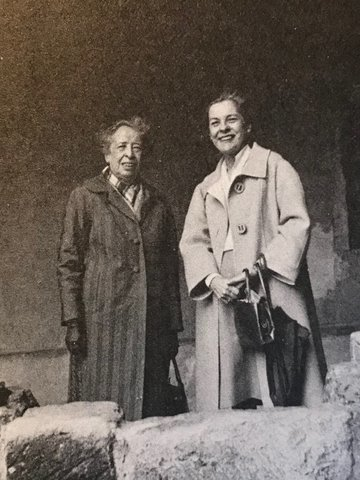
Arendt with Mary McCarthy

In addition to her affair with Heidegger, and her two marriages, Arendt had close friendships. Since her death, her correspondence with many of them has been published, revealing much information about her thinking. To her friends she was both loyal and generous, dedicating several of her works to them. Freundschaft (friendship) she described as being one of the "tätigen Modi des Lebendigseins" (the active modes of being alive), and, to her, friendship was central both to her life and to the concept of politics. Hans Jonas described her as having a "genius for friendship", and, in her own words, "der Eros der Freundschaft" (love of friendship).

Her philosophy-based friendships were male and European, while her later American friendships were more diverse, literary, and political. Although she became an American citizen in 1950, her cultural roots remained European, and her language remained her German "Muttersprache" (mother tongue). She surrounded herself with German-speaking émigrés, sometimes referred to as "The Tribe". To her, wirkliche Menschen (real people) were "pariahs", not in the sense of outcasts, but in the sense of outsiders, unassimilated, with the virtue of "social nonconformism ... the sine qua non of intellectual achievement", a sentiment she shared with Jaspers.

Arendt always had a beste Freundin (best friend [female]). In her teens she had formed a lifelong relationship with her Jugendfreundin, Anne Mendelssohn Weil ("Ännchen"). After she emigrated to America, Hilde Fränkel, Paul Tillich's secretary and mistress, filled that role until the latter died in 1950. After the war, Arendt was able to return to Germany and renew her relationship with Weil, who made several visits to New York, especially after Blücher's death in 1970. Their last meeting was in Tegna, Switzerland in 1975, shortly before Arendt's death. With Fränkel's death, Mary McCarthy became Arendt's closest friend and confidante.

== Final illness and death ==
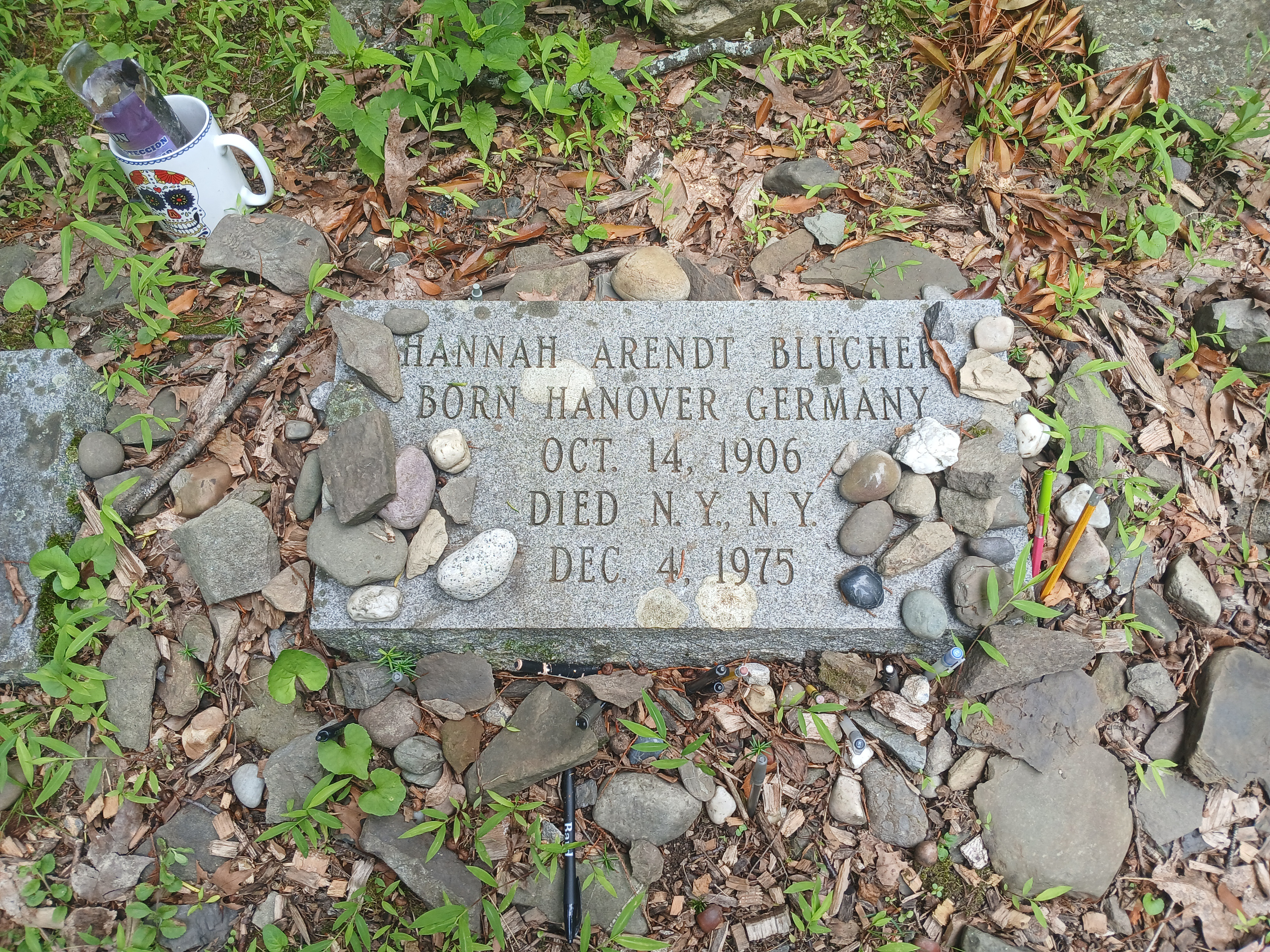
Hannah Arendt's grave at Bard College Cemetery in Annandale-on-Hudson, New York

Heinrich Blücher had survived a cerebral aneurysm in 1961 and remained unwell after 1963. On 31 October 1970, he died of a heart attack. A devastated Arendt had previously told Mary McCarthy, "Life without him would be unthinkable". Arendt was a heavy smoker and was frequently depicted with a cigarette in her hand. She sustained a near-fatal heart attack while lecturing in Scotland in May 1974, and although she recovered, she remained in poor health and continued to smoke. On the evening of 4 December 1975, shortly after her 69th birthday, she had a heart attack in her apartment while entertaining friends, and was pronounced dead at the scene. Her ashes were buried alongside those of Blücher at Bard College, in Annandale-on-Hudson, New York, in May 1976.

After Arendt's death the title page of the final part of The Life of the Mind ("Judging") was found in her typewriter, which she had just started, consisting of the title and two epigraphs. This has subsequently been reproduced in the edited version of her Lectures on Kant's Political Philosophy.

== Work ==
Arendt wrote works on intellectual history as a political theorist, using events and actions to develop insights into contemporary totalitarian movements and the threat to human freedom presented by scientific abstraction and bourgeois morality. Intellectually, she was an independent thinker, a loner, not a "joiner", separating herself from schools of thought or ideology. In addition to her major texts she published anthologies, including Between Past and Future (1961), Men in Dark Times (1968), and Crises of the Republic (1972). She also contributed to many publications, including The New York Review of Books, Commonweal, Dissent and The New Yorker. She is perhaps best known for her accounts of Adolf Eichmann and his trial, because of the intense controversy that it generated.

=== Political theory and philosophical system ===
While Arendt never developed a systematic political theory and her writing does not easily lend itself to categorization, the tradition of thought most closely identified with Arendt is that of civic republicanism, from Aristotle to Tocqueville. Her political concept is centered around active citizenship that emphasizes civic engagement and collective deliberation. She believed that no matter how bad, government could never succeed in extinguishing human freedom, despite holding that modern societies frequently retreat from democratic freedom with its inherent disorder for the relative comfort of administrative bureaucracy. Some have claimed her political legacy is her strong defence of freedom in the face of an increasingly less than free world. She does not adhere to a single systematic philosophy, but rather spans a range of subjects covering totalitarianism, revolution, the nature of freedom, and the faculties of thought and judgment.

While she is best known for her work on "dark times", (Note: Dark Times: A phrase she took from Brecht's poem An die Nachgeborenen ("To Those Born After", 1938), the first line of which reads Wirklich, ich lebe in finsteren Zeiten! (Truly, I live in dark times!). To both Brecht and Arendt, "Dark Times" was not merely a descriptive term for perceived atrocities but an explanation of the loss of guiding principles of theory, knowledge, and explanation) the nature of totalitarianism and evil, she imbued this with a spark of hope and confidence in the nature of Mankind:

That even in the darkest of times we have the right to expect some illumination, and that such illumination might well come less from theories and concepts than from the uncertain, flickering, and often weak light that some men and women, in their lives and their works, will kindle under almost all circumstances and shed over the time span that was given to them. Men in Dark Times (1968)

=== Love and Saint Augustine (1929) ===
Arendt's doctoral thesis, Der Liebesbegriff bei Augustin. Versuch einer philosophischen Interpretation (Love and Saint Augustine. Towards a philosophical interpretation), was published in 1929 and attracted critical interest, although an English translation did not appear until 1996. In this work she combined approaches of both Heidegger and Jaspers. Arendt's interpretation of love in the work of Augustine deals with three concepts, love as craving or desire (Amor qua appetitus), love in the relationship between man (creatura) and creator (Creator – Creatura), and neighborly love (Dilectio proximi). Love as craving anticipates the future, while love for the Creator deals with the remembered past. Of the three, dilectio proximi or caritas (Note: Latin has three nouns for love: amor, dilectio, and caritas. The corresponding verbs for the first two are amare and diligere) is perceived as the most fundamental, to which the first two are oriented, which she treats as vita socialis (social life) – the second of the Great Commandments (or Golden Rule) "Thou shalt love thy neighbor as thyself" uniting and transcending the former. Augustine's influence (and Jaspers' views on his work) persisted in Arendt's writings for the rest of her life.

Amor mundi

Amor mundi – warum ist es so schwer, die Welt zu lieben?
Love of the world – why is it so difficult to love the world?

— Denktagebuch I: 522

Some of the leitmotifs of her canon were apparent, introducing the concept of Natalität (Natality) as a key condition of human existence and its role in the development of the individual, developing this further in The Human Condition (1958). She explained that the construct of natality was implied in her discussion of new beginnings and Man's elation to the Creator as nova creatura. The centrality of the theme of birth and renewal is apparent in the constant reference to Augustinian thought, and specifically the innovative nature of birth, from this, her first work, to her last, The Life of the Mind.

Love is another connecting theme. In addition to the Augustinian loves expostulated in her dissertation, the phrase amor mundi (love of the world) is one often associated with Arendt and both permeates her work and was an absorbing passion throughout her work. She took the phrase from Augustine's homily on the first epistle of St John, "If love of the world dwell in us". Amor mundi was her original title for The Human Condition (1958), (Note: Arendt explained to Karl Jaspers, in a letter dated 6 August 1955, that she intended to use St. Augustine's concept of amor mundi as the title, as a token of gratitude) the subtitle of Elisabeth Young-Bruehl's biography (1982), the title of a collection of writing on faith in her work and is the newsletter of the Hannah Arendt Center at Bard College.

=== The Origins of Totalitarianism (1951) ===
Arendt's first major book, The Origins of Totalitarianism, (1951), examined the roots of Stalinism and Nazism, structured as three essays, "Antisemitism", "Imperialism", and "Totalitarianism".

This work includes, but is not limited to what may be considered the first attempt to treat the Holocaust (an event for which there was no established nomenclature at the time) as a discrete epiphenomenal catastrophe, as opposed to referring to the genocide as a vaguely defined halo of atrocities occurring during the war.

Arendt's Origins appears before Reitlinger's Final Solution and a full decade prior to Hilberg's Destruction of the European Jews. Many testimonies, of course, preceded this book; as did the Nuremberg Trials. The word genocide had been invented as a special legal term for what happened. All these aspects of the record are rudiments of active discussion prior to Arendt's Origins. But the testimonies largely record individual perspectives on specific camps, memorials of the destruction of a particular village by the survivors from that village etc., and the Nuremberg Trial documents were not archived in a form that made them accessible to the public. Nevertheless her main theme is totalitarianism and its evolution though, as she argues, concentration camps are an essential aspect of totalitarianism politics.

Arendt argues that totalitarianism was a "novel form of government", that "differs essentially from other forms of political oppression known to us such as despotism, tyranny and dictatorship" in that it applied terror to subjugate mass populations rather than just political adversaries. Arendt also maintained that Jewry was not the operative factor in the Holocaust, but merely a convenient proxy because Nazism was about terror and consistency, not merely eradicating Jews. Arendt explained the tyranny using Kant's phrase "radical evil", by which their victims became "superfluous people". In later editions she enlarged the text to include her work on "Ideology and Terror: A novel form of government" and the Hungarian Revolution, but then published the latter separately.

Criticism of Origins has often focused on its portrayal of the two movements, Hitlerism and Stalinism, as equally tyrannical.

=== Rahel Varnhagen: The Life of a Jewess (1957) ===
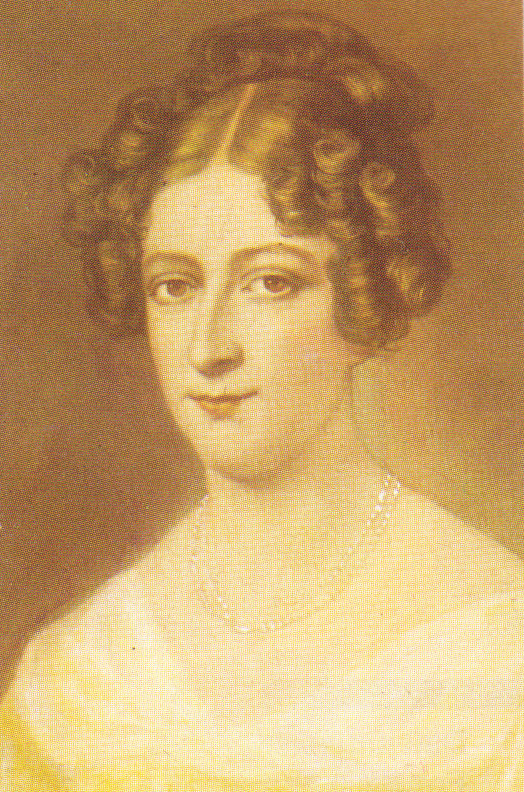
Rahel Varnhagen c. 1800

Arendt's Habilitationsschrift on Rahel Varnhagen was completed while she was living in exile in Paris in 1938, but not published till 1957, in the United Kingdom by East and West Library, part of the Leo Baeck Institute. This biography of a nineteenth-century Jewish socialite formed an important step in her analysis of Jewish history and the subjects of assimilation and emancipation, and introduced her treatment of the Jewish diaspora as either pariah or parvenu. In addition it represents an early version of her concept of history. The book is dedicated to Anne Mendelssohn, who first drew her attention to Varnhagen. Arendt's relation to Varnhagen permeates her subsequent work. Her account of Varnhagen's life was perceived during a time of the destruction of German-Jewish culture. It partially reflects Arendt's own view of herself as a German-Jewish woman driven out of her own culture into a stateless existence, leading to the description "biography as autobiography".

=== The Human Condition (1958) ===
In what is arguably her most influential work, The Human Condition (1958), Arendt differentiates political and social concepts, labor and work, and various forms of actions; she then explores the implications of those distinctions. Her theory of political action, corresponding to the existence of a public realm, is extensively developed in this work. Arendt argues that, while human life always evolves within societies, the social part of human nature, political life, has been intentionally realized in only a few societies as a space for individuals to achieve freedom. Conceptual categories, which attempt to bridge the gap between ontological and sociological structures, are sharply delineated. While Arendt relegates labor and work to the realm of the social, she favors the human condition of action as that which is both existential and aesthetic. Of human actions, Arendt identifies two that she considers essential. These are forgiving past wrong (or unfixing the fixed past) and promising future benefit (or fixing the unfixed future).

Arendt had first introduced the concept of "natality" in her Love and Saint Augustine (1929) and in The Human Condition starts to develop this further. In this, she departs from Heidegger's emphasis on mortality. Arendt's positive message is one of the "miracle of beginning", the continual arrival of the new to create action, that is to alter the state of affairs brought about by previous actions. "Men", she wrote "though they must die, are not born in order to die but in order to begin". She defined her use of "natality" as:

The miracle that saves the world, the realm of human affairs, from its normal, "natural" ruin is ultimately the fact of natality, in which the faculty of action is ontologically rooted. It is, in other words, the birth of new men and the new beginning, the action they are capable of by virtue of being born.

Natality would go on to become a central concept of her political theory, and also what Karin Fry considers its most optimistic one.

=== Between Past and Future (1954...1968) ===
Between Past and Future is an anthology of eight essays written between 1954 and 1968, dealing with a variety of different but connected philosophical subjects. These essays share the central idea that humans live between the past and the uncertain future. Man must permanently think to exist, but must learn thinking. Humans have resorted to tradition, but are abandoning respect for this tradition and culture. Arendt tries to find solutions to help humans think again, since modern philosophy has not succeeded in helping humans to live correctly.

=== On Revolution (1963) ===
Arendt's book On Revolution presents a comparison of two of the main revolutions of the 18th century, the American and French Revolutions. She goes against a common impression of both Marxist and leftist views when she argues that France, while well-studied and often emulated, was a disaster and that the largely ignored American Revolution was a success. The turning point in the French Revolution occurred when the leaders rejected their goals of freedom to focus on compassion for the masses. In the United States, the founders never betray the goal of Constitutio Libertatis. Arendt believes the revolutionary spirit of those men had been lost, however, and advocates a "council system" as an appropriate institution to regain that spirit.

=== Men in Dark Times (1968) ===
The anthology of essays Men in Dark Times presents intellectual biographies of some creative and moral figures of the 20th century, such as Walter Benjamin, Karl Jaspers, Rosa Luxemburg, Hermann Broch, Pope John XXIII, and Isak Dinesen.

=== Crises of the Republic (1972) ===
Crises of the Republic was the third of Arendt's anthologies, consisting of four essays. These related essays deal with contemporary American politics and the crises it faced in the 1960s and 1970s. "Lying in Politics" looks for an explanation behind the administration's deception regarding the Vietnam War, as revealed in the Pentagon Papers. "Civil Disobedience" examines the opposition movements, while the final "Thoughts on Politics and Revolution" is a commentary, in the form of an interview on the third essay, "On Violence". In "On Violence" Arendt substantiates that violence presupposes power which she understands as a property of groups. Thus, she breaks with the predominant conception of power as derived from violence.

=== The Life of the Mind (1978) ===
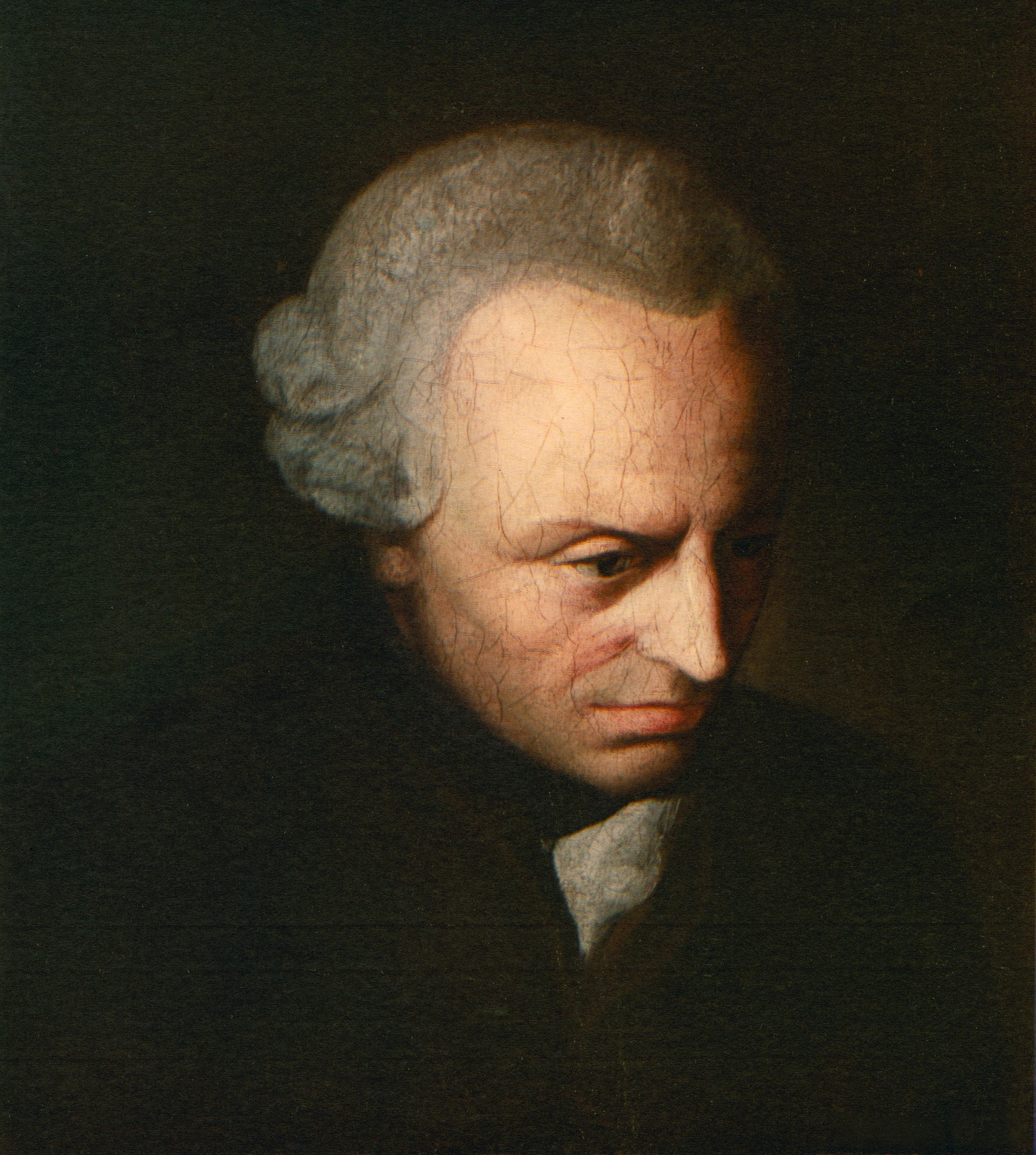
Immanuel Kant

Arendt's last major work, The Life of the Mind remained incomplete at the time of her death in 1975, but marked a return to moral philosophy. The outline of the book was based on her graduate level political philosophy class, Philosophy of the Mind, and her Gifford Lectures in Scotland. She conceived of the work as a trilogy based on the mental activities of thinking, willing, and judging. Her most recent work had focused on the first two, but went beyond this in terms of vita activa. Her discussion of thinking was based on Socrates and his notion of thinking as a solitary dialogue between oneself, leading her to novel concepts of conscience.

Arendt died suddenly five days after completing the second part, with the first page of Judging still in her typewriter, and McCarthy then edited the first two parts and provided some indication of the direction of the third. Arendt's exact intentions for the third part are unknown but she left several manuscripts (such as Thinking and Moral Considerations, Some Questions on Moral Philosophy and Lectures on Kant's Political Philosophy) relating to her thoughts on the mental faculty of Judging. These have since been published separately.

=== Collected works ===
After Arendt died in 1975, her essays and notes have continued to be collected, edited and published posthumously by friends and colleagues, mainly under the editorship of Jerome Kohn, including those that give some insight into the unfinished third part of The Life of the Mind. Some dealt with her Jewish identity. The Jew as Pariah: Jewish Identity and Politics in the Modern Age (1978), is a collection of 15 essays and letters from the period 1943–1966 on the situation of Jews in modern times, to try and throw some light on her views on the Jewish world, following the backlash to Eichmann, but proved to be equally polarizing. A further collection of her writings on being Jewish was published as The Jewish Writings (2007). Her work on moral philosophy appeared as Lectures on Kant's Political Philosophy (1982) and Responsibility and Judgment (2003), and her literary works as Reflections on Literature and Culture (2007).

Other work includes the collection of forty, largely fugitive, (Note: Fugitive writings: Dealing with subjects of passing interest) essays, addresses, and reviews covering the period 1930–1954, entitled Essays in Understanding 1930–1954: Formation, Exile, and Totalitarianism (1994). These presaged her monumental The Origins of Totalitarianism, in particular On the Nature of Totalitarianism (1953) and The Concern with Politics in Contemporary European Philosophical Thought (1954). However these attracted little attention. However after a new version of Origins of Totalitarianism appeared in 2004 followed by The Promise of Politics in 2005 there appeared a new interest in Arendtiana. This led to a second series of her remaining essays, Thinking Without a Banister: Essays in Understanding, 1953–1975, published in 2018. Her notebooks which form a series of memoirs, were published as Denktagebuch in 2002.

=== Poetry ===
Arendt began writing poetry in her adolescence, but it was intensely personal and few knew of the existence of her poems until her archives at the Library of Congress were made accessible by McCarthy in 1988. She began collecting them in 1923 and they were one of the few things she took with her on her flight from Berlin and escape to the United States. They remained unpublished in her lifetime, although she had typed, edited and bound them after she arrived in New York and they were rediscovered at the library by Samantha Rose Hill in 2011. The early poems that she brought with her were deposited with her papers in the library. Other later poems were found in notebooks in the German Literature Archive, Marbach, Germany, where she had placed them just before her death in 1975. Some further poems were found in her correspondence with Heidegger, Blücher and Broch.

It was not until 2025 that her seventy-one collected poems were first published in a bilingual German-English edition.

=== Correspondence ===
Some further insight into her thinking is provided in the continuing posthumous publication of her correspondence with many of the important figures in her life, including Karl Jaspers (1992), Mary McCarthy (1995), Heinrich Blücher (1996), Martin Heidegger (2004), (Note: Arendt/Heidegger: Arendt willed that her correspondence be taken to the Deutsches Literaturarchiv in Marbach in 1976 and sealed for 5 years, and Heidegger's family stipulated that it remained sealed during Martin Heidegger's wife Elfride's lifetime (1893–1992). In 1976, Elzbieta Ettinger sought access and was granted this for a planned biography after Elfride's death. The subsequent scandal following Ettinger's disclosures, led to a decision to publish the correspondence in entirety) Alfred Kazin (2005), Walter Benjamin (2006), Gershom Scholem (2011) and Günther Stern (2016). Other correspondences that have been published include those with women friends such as Hilde Fränkel and Anne Mendelssohn Weil (see Relationships).

=== Arendt and the Eichmann trial (1961–1963) ===
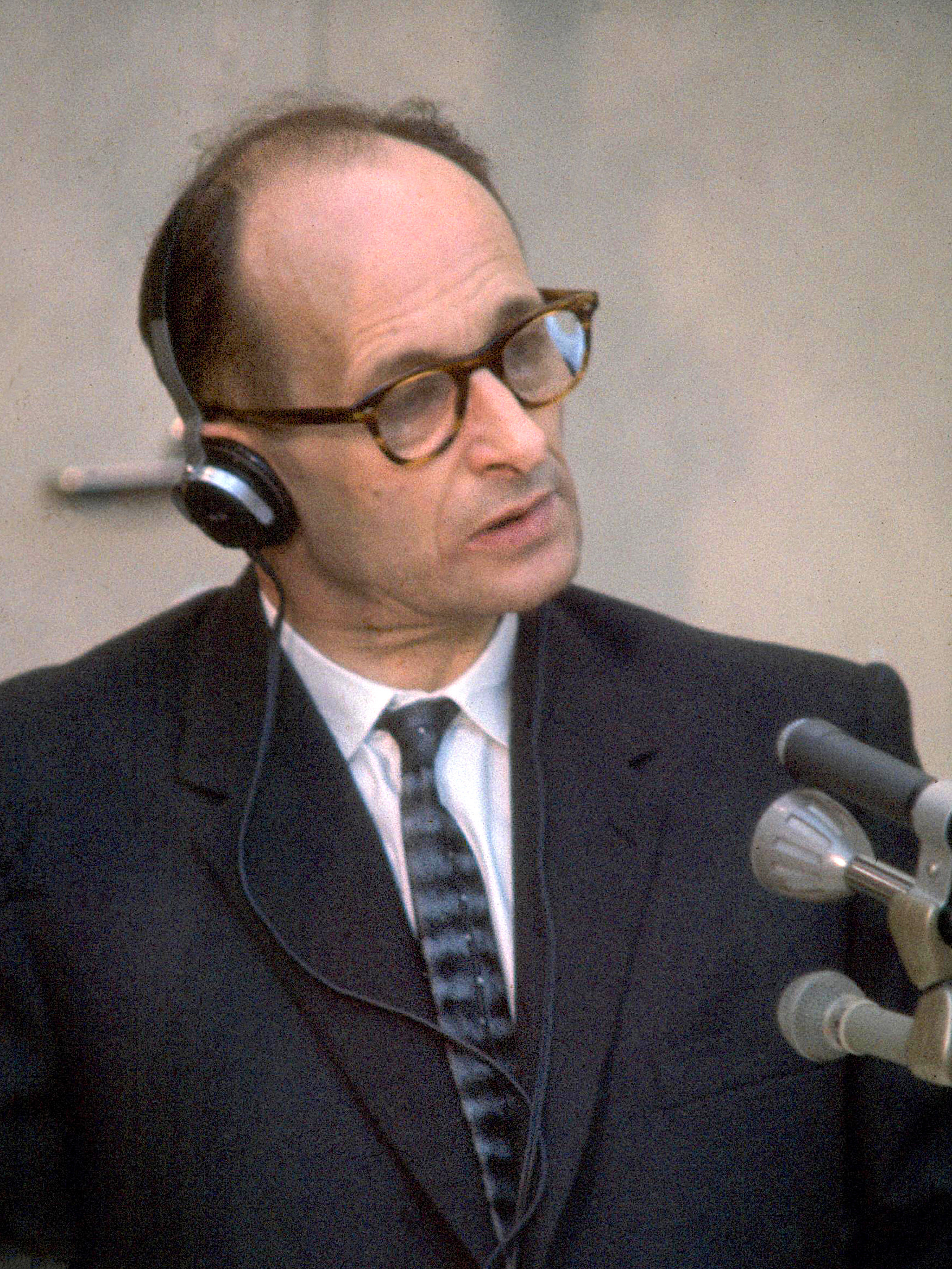
Eichmann on trial in 1961

In 1960, on hearing of Adolf Eichmann's capture and plans for his trial, Hannah Arendt contacted The New Yorker and offered to travel to Israel to cover it when it opened on 11 April 1961. Arendt was anxious to test her theories, developed in The Origins of Totalitarianism, and see how justice would be administered to the sort of man she had written about. Also she had witnessed "little of the Nazi regime directly" (Note: Arendt to Jaspers, 2 December 1960) and this was an opportunity to witness an agent of totalitarianism first hand. The offer was accepted and she attended six weeks of the five-month trial with her young Israeli cousin, Edna Brocke. On arrival she was treated as a celebrity, meeting with the trial chief judge, Moshe Landau, and the foreign minister, Golda Meir. In her subsequent 1963 report, based on her observations and transcripts, and which evolved into the book Eichmann in Jerusalem: A Report on the Banality of Evil, Arendt coined the phrase "the banality of evil" to describe the Eichmann phenomenon. She, like others, was struck by his very ordinariness and the demeanor he exhibited of a small, slightly balding, bland bureaucrat, in contrast to the horrific crimes he stood accused of. He was, she wrote, "terribly and terrifyingly normal." She examined the question of whether evil is radical or simply a function of thoughtlessness, a tendency of ordinary people to obey orders and conform to mass opinion without a critical evaluation of the consequences of their actions. Arendt's argument was that Eichmann was not a monster, contrasting the immensity of his actions with the very ordinariness of the man himself. Eichmann, she stated, not only called himself a Zionist, having initially opposed the Jewish persecution, but also expected his captors to understand him. She pointed out that his actions were not driven by malice, but rather blind dedication to the regime and his need to belong, to be a "joiner".

On this, Arendt would later state "Going along with the rest and wanting to say 'we' were quite enough to make the greatest of all crimes possible". (Note: "Er wollte Wir sagen, und dies Mitmachen und dies Wir-Sagen-Wollen war ja ganz genug, um die allergrössten Verbrechen möglich zu machen.") What Arendt observed during the trial was a bourgeois sales clerk who found a meaningful role for himself and a sense of importance in the Nazi movement. She noted that his addiction to clichés and use of bureaucratic morality clouded his ability to question his actions, "to think". This led her to set out her most debated dictum: "the lesson that this long course in human wickedness had taught us – the lesson of the fearsome, word-and-thought-defying banality of evil." By stating that Eichmann did not think, she did not imply lack of conscious awareness of his actions, but by "thinking" she implied reflective rationality, that was lacking.

Arendt was critical of the way the trial was conducted by the Israelis as a "show trial" with ulterior motives other than simply trying evidence and administering justice. Arendt was also critical of the way Israel depicted Eichmann's crimes as crimes against a nation-state, rather than against humanity itself. She objected to the idea that a strong Israel was necessary to protect world Jewry being again placed where "they'll let themselves be slaughtered like sheep," recalling the biblical phrase. (Note: Arendt to Jaspers, 23 December 1960) She portrayed the prosecutor, Attorney General Gideon Hausner, as employing hyperbolic rhetoric in the pursuit of Prime Minister Ben-Gurion's political agenda. Arendt, who believed she could maintain her focus on moral principles in the face of outrage, became increasingly frustrated with Hausner, describing his parade of survivors as having "no apparent bearing on the case". (Note: A position that the judges would later agree with) She was particularly concerned that Hausner repeatedly asked "why did you not rebel?" rather than question the role of the Jewish leaders. On this point, Arendt argued that during the Holocaust some of them cooperated with Eichmann "almost without exception" in the destruction of their own people. These leaders, notably M. C. Rumkowski, constituted the Jewish Councils (Judenräte). She had expressed concerns on this point prior to the trial. (Note: Arendt to Jaspers, 23 December 1960) She described this as a moral catastrophe. While her argument was not to allocate blame, rather she mourned what she considered a moral failure of compromising the imperative that it is better to suffer wrong than to do wrong. She describes the cooperation of the Jewish leaders in terms of a disintegration of Jewish morality: "This role of the Jewish leaders in the destruction of their own people is undoubtedly the darkest chapter in the whole dark story". Widely misunderstood, this caused an even greater controversy and particularly animosity toward her in the Jewish community and in Israel. For Arendt, the Eichmann trial marked a turning point in her thinking in the final decade of her life, becoming increasingly preoccupied with moral philosophy.

==== Reception ====
Arendt's five-part series "Eichmann in Jerusalem" appeared in The New Yorker in February 1963 some nine months after Eichmann was hanged on 31 May 1962. By this time his trial was largely forgotten in the popular mind, superseded by intervening world events. However, no other account of either Eichmann or National Socialism has aroused so much controversy. Before its publication, Arendt was considered a brilliant humanistic original political thinker. Her mentor, Karl Jaspers, however, had warned her about a possible adverse outcome, "The Eichmann trial will be no pleasure for you. I'm afraid it cannot go well". (Note: Jaspers to Arendt 14 October 1960) On publication, three controversies immediately occupied public attention: the concept of Eichmann as banal, her criticism of the role of Israel and her description of the role played by the Jewish people themselves.

Arendt was profoundly shocked by the response, writing to Karl Jaspers "People are resorting to any means to destroy my reputation ... They have spent weeks trying to find something in my past that they can hang on me". Now she was being called arrogant, heartless and ill-informed. She was accused of being duped by Eichmann, of being a "self-hating Jewess", and even an enemy of Israel. Her critics included the Anti-Defamation League and many other Jewish groups, editors of publications she was a contributor to, faculty at the universities she taught at, and friends from all parts of her life. Her friend Gershom Scholem, a major scholar of Jewish mysticism, broke off relations with her, publishing their correspondence without her permission. Arendt was criticized by many Jewish public figures, who charged her with coldness and lack of sympathy for the victims of the Holocaust. Because of this lingering criticism, neither this book nor any of her other works were translated into Hebrew until 1999. Arendt responded to the controversies in the book's postscript.

Although Arendt complained that she was being criticized for telling the truth – "what a risky business to tell the truth on a factual level without theoretical and scholarly embroidery" (Note: Letter to McCarthy 16 September 1963) – the criticism was largely directed to her theorizing on the nature of mankind and evil and that ordinary people were driven to commit the inexplicable not so much by hatred and ideology as ambition, and inability to empathize. Equally problematic was the suggestion that the victims deceived themselves and complied in their own destruction. Prior to Arendt's depiction of Eichmann, his popular image had been, as The New York Times put it "the most evil monster of humanity" and as a representative of "an atrocious crime, unparalleled in history", "the extermination of European Jews". As it turned out Arendt and others were correct in pointing out that Eichmann's characterization by the prosecution as the architect and chief technician of the Holocaust was not entirely credible.

While much has been made of Arendt's treatment of Eichmann, Ada Ushpiz, in her 2015 documentary Vita Activa: The Spirit of Hannah Arendt, placed it in a much broader context of the use of rationality to explain seemingly irrational historical events. (Note: The title vita activa (active life) is taken from Arendt's position in The Human Condition (1958) that thinking is a form of action, and that the active life is as important as the contemplative (vita contemplativa))

==== Kein Mensch hat das Recht zu gehorchen ====
Tax offices in Bolzano, former seat of the Fascist party
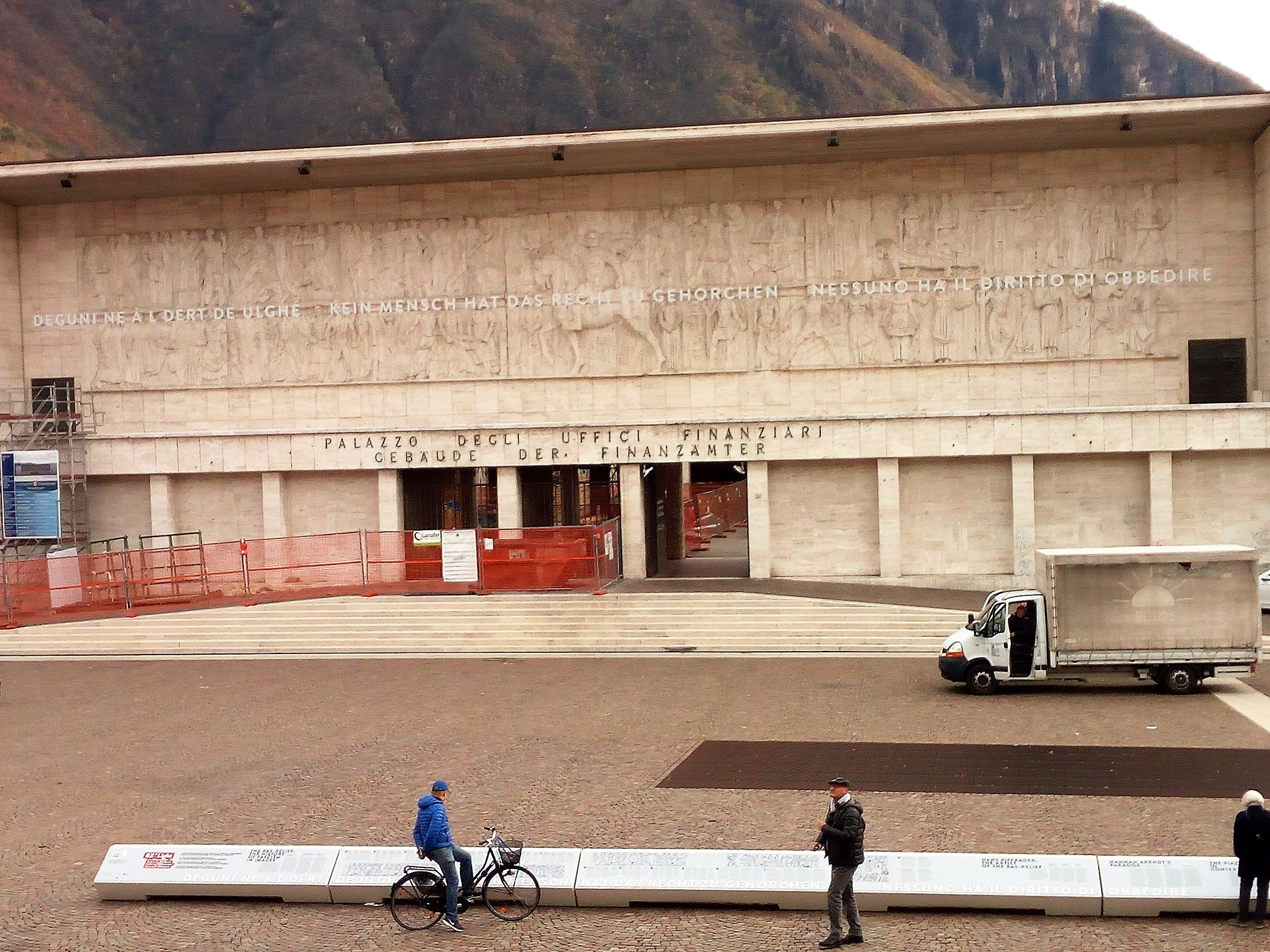
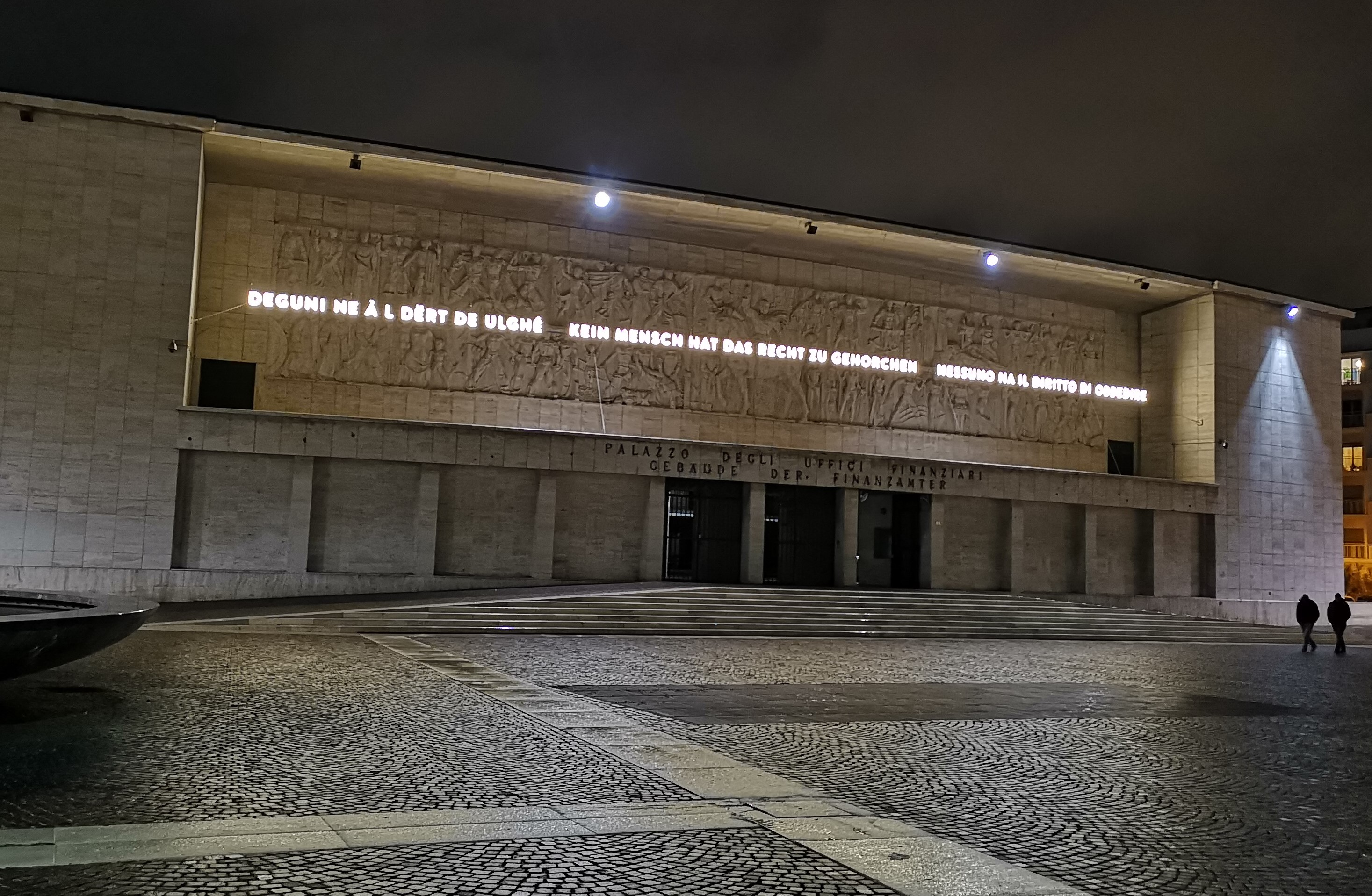
By Day and Night. Italian Fascist monument reworked to display a version of Arendt's statement "No one has the right to obey."

In an interview with Joachim Fest in 1964, Arendt was asked about Eichmann's defense that he had made Kant's principle of the duty of obedience his guiding principle all his life. Arendt replied that that was outrageous and that Eichmann was misusing Kant, by not considering the element of judgement required in assessing one's own actions – "Kein Mensch hat bei Kant das Recht zu gehorchen" (No man has, according to Kant, the right to obey), she stated, paraphrasing Kant. The reference was to Kant's Die Religion innerhalb der Grenzen der bloßen Vernunft (Religion within the Bounds of Bare Reason 1793) in which he states:

Der Satz 'man muß Gott mehr gehorchen, als den Menschen' bedeutet nur, daß, wenn die letzten etwas gebieten, was an sich böse (dem Sittengesetz unmittelbar zuwider) ist, ihnen nicht gehorcht werden darf und soll (The saying, "We must hearken to God, rather than to man," signifies no more than this, viz. that should any earthly legislation enjoin something immediately contradictory of the moral law, obedience is not to be rendered)

Kant clearly defines a higher moral duty than rendering merely unto Caesar. Arendt herself had written in her book "This was outrageous, on the face of it, and also incomprehensible, since Kant's moral philosophy is so closely bound up with man's faculty of judgment, which rules out blind obedience." Arendt's reply to Fest has since been widely quoted as Niemand hat das Recht zu gehorchen (No one has the right to obey), changing Kein Mensch (No person) to the more generic Niemand (No one) and omitting the attribution bei Kant (according to Kant), although it does encapsulate an aspect of her moral philosophy. The phrase Niemand hat das Recht zu gehorchen has become one of her iconic images, appearing on the wall of the house in which she was born (see Commemorations), among other places. A fascist bas-relief on the Palazzo degli Uffici Finanziari (1942), in the Piazza del Tribunale, (Note: The Palazzo degli Uffici Finanziari was originally the Casa del Fascio and the square, the Piazza Arnaldo Mussolini, and was erected as the Fascist headquarters for the region. The bas-relief is by Hans Piffrader) Bolzano, Italy celebrating Mussolini, reads Credere, Obbedire, Combattere (Believe, Obey, Combat). In 2017, its 'Obey' meaning was altered using Arendt's original phrasing, less the attribution, projected upon it in the three official languages of the region. (Note: Ladin, German and Italian: Degnu n'a l dërt de ulghè – Kein Mensch hat das Recht zu gehorchen – Nessuno ha il diritto di obbedire)

The phrase has also appeared in other artistic works featuring anti-authoritarian political messages, such as the 2015 installation by Wilfried Gerstel, which has evoked the concept of resistance to dictatorship.

=== List of selected publications ===
==== Bibliographies ====
- Heller, Anne C (23 July 2005). "Selected Bibliography: A Life in Dark Times". Anne C. Heller. Archived from the original on 18 August 2018.
- Kohn, Jerome (2018). "Bibliographical Works". Hannah Arendt Center for Politics and Humanities at Bard College. Archived from the original on 1 July 2018., in Hannah Arendt Center
- Yanase, Yosuke (3 May 2008). "Hannah Arendt's major works". Philosophical Investigations for Applied Linguistics. Archived from the original on 26 July 2018.
- "Arendt works". Thinking and Judging with Hannah Arendt: Political theory class. University of Helsinki. 2010–2012. Archived from the original on 8 March 2021.

==== Books ====
- Arendt, Hannah (1929). Der Liebesbegriff bei Augustin: Versuch einer philosophischen Interpretation [On the concept of love in the thought of Saint Augustine: Attempt at a philosophical interpretation] (PDF) (Doctoral thesis, Department of Philosophy, University of Heidelberg) (in German). Berlin: Springer. Archived (PDF) from the original on 22 September 2015., reprinted as
  - — (2006). Der Liebesbegriff bei Augustin: Versuch einer philosophischen Interpretation (in German). Georg Olms Verlag. ISBN 978-3-487-13262-4. Full text on Internet Archive
  - Also available in English as:
    — (1996). Scott, Joanna Vecchiarelli; Stark, Judith Chelius (eds.). Love and Saint Augustine. University of Chicago Press. ISBN 978-0-226-02596-4. Full text on Internet Archive
- — (1997) [1938, published 1957]. Weissberg, Liliane (ed.). Rahel Varnhagen: Lebensgeschichte einer deutschen Jüdin aus der Romantik [Rahel Varnhagen: The Life of a Jewess] (Habilitation thesis). Translated by Richard and Clara Winston. Baltimore: Johns Hopkins University Press. ISBN 978-0-8018-5587-0. 400 pages. (see Rahel Varnhagen)
  - Azria, Régine (1987). "Review of Rahel Varnhagen. La vie d'une juive allemande à l'époque du romantisme". Archives de sciences sociales des religions (Review). 32 (64.2): 233. ISSN 0335-5985. JSTOR 30129073.
    - Weissberg, Liliane; Elon, Amos (10 June 1999). "Hannah Arendt's Integrity". The New York Review of Books (Editorial letters). Archived from the original on 31 August 2018.
  - Zohn, Harry (1960). "Review of Rahel Varnhagen. The Life of a Jewess". Jewish Social Studies (Review). 22 (3): 180–81. ISSN 0021-6704. JSTOR 4465809.
- — (1976) [1951, New York: Schocken]. The Origins of Totalitarianism [Elemente und Ursprünge totaler Herrschaft] (revised ed.). Houghton Mifflin Harcourt. ISBN 978-0-547-54315-4., (see also The Origins of Totalitarianism and Comparison of Nazism and Stalinism) Full text (1979 edition) on Internet Archive
  - Riesman, David (1 April 1951). "The Origins of Totalitarianism, by Hannah Arendt". Commentary (Review). Archived from the original on 2 July 2019.
  - Nisbet, Robert (1992). "Arendt on Totalitarianism". The National Interest (Review) (27): 85–91. JSTOR 42896812.
- — (2013) [1958]. The Human Condition (Second ed.). University of Chicago Press. ISBN 978-0-226-92457-1. Archived from the original on 3 December 2023. (see also The Human Condition)
- — (1958). Die ungarische Revolution und der totalitäre Imperialismus (in German). München: R. Piper & Co Verlag. Archived from the original on 3 December 2023.
- — (2006) [1961, New York: Viking]. Between Past and Future. Penguin Publishing Group. ISBN 978-1-101-66265-6. Archived from the original on 3 December 2023. (see also Between Past and Future)
- — (2006b) [1963, New York: Viking]. On Revolution. Penguin Publishing Group. ISBN 978-1-101-66264-9. (see also On Revolution) Full text on Internet Archive
- — (2006a) [1963, Viking Press, revised 1968]. Eichmann in Jerusalem: A Report on the Banality of Evil. Penguin Publishing Group. ISBN 978-1-101-00716-7. Full text: 1964 edition Archived 23 September 2020 at the Wayback Machine (see also Eichmann in Jerusalem)
- — (1968). Men in Dark Times. New York: Harcourt Brace Jovanovich. ISBN 978-0-15-658890-4.
- — (1972). Crises of the Republic: Lying in Politics; Civil Disobedience; On Violence; Thoughts on Politics and Revolution. New York: Harcourt Brace Jovanovich. ISBN 978-0-15-623200-5. (Note: "Civil Disobedience" originally appeared, in somewhat different form, in The New Yorker. Versions of the other essays originally appeared in The New York Review of Books) "Lying in Politics" (PDF). Archived (PDF) from the original on 4 April 2020.
  - Nott, Kathleen (1 August 1972). "Crises of the Republic, by Hannah Arendt". Commentary (Review). Archived from the original on 24 July 2018.
- — (2025a). An Essay on the Philosophy of Karl Jaspers. New York: Arendt Editions. ISBN 979-8285979654.

==== Articles and essays ====
- —; Stern, Günther (1930). "Rilkes Duineser Elegien". Neue Schweizer Rundschau. 23: 855–871. doi:10.5169/seals-760191. Archived from the original on 8 March 2021. (English translation in Arendt & Stern (2007m, pp. 1–23))
- — (12 April 1930a). "Augustin und Protestantismus" [Augustine and Protestanism]. Frankfurter Zeitung. No. 902. Translated by Robert and Rita Kimber. p. 1. (reprinted in Arendt (2011, pp. 24–27))
- — (1930b). "Philosophie und Soziologie. Anläßlich Karl Mannheims Ideologie und Utopie" [Philosophy and Sociology]. Die Gesellschaft. 7 (1). Translated by Robert and Rita Kimber: 163–176. (reprinted in Arendt (2011, pp. 28–43))
- — (1931). "Rezension von: Hans Weil: Die Entstehung des Deutschen Bildungsprinzips" [On the emancipation of women]. Archiv für Sozialwissenschaft und Sozialpolitik (Review). 66. Translated by Elisabeh Young-Bruehl: 200–05.
- — (1932). "Aufklärung und Judenfrage" [The Enlightenment and the Jewish Question]. Zeitschrift für die Geschichte der Juden in Deutschland (in German). 4 (2/3): 65–77. Archived from the original on 8 March 2021. (reprinted in Arendt-Stern (2009m, pp. 3–18))
- — (1932a). "Rezension über Alice Rühle-Gerstel: Das Frauenproblem in der Gegenwart. Eine psychologische Bilanz". Die Gesellschaft (in German). 10 (2): 177–179. (reprinted in Arendt (2011, pp. 66–68))
- — (13–17 September 1932b). "Adam-Müller-Renaissance?". Kölnische Zeitung (in German). No. 501, 510. (English translation in Arendt (2007n, pp. 38–45))
- — (July 1942). "From the Dreyfus Affair to France Today". Jewish Social Studies. 4 (3): 195–240. JSTOR 4615201.
- — (31 January 1943). "We refugees" (PDF). Menorah Journal. 31 (1): 69–77. Archived from the original (PDF) on 9 February 2019., reprinted in Arendt (1978a, pp. 55–67) and Robinson (1996, pp. 110–19)
- — (1944). "The Jew as Pariah: A Hidden Tradition". Jewish Social Studies. 6 (2): 99–122. JSTOR 4464588. (reprinted in Arendt (2009n, pp. 275–297))
- — (1958). "Totalitarian Imperialism: Reflections on the Hungarian Revolution". The Journal of Politics. 20 (1): 5–43. doi:10.2307/2127387. JSTOR 2127387. S2CID 154428972.
- — (Winter 1959). "Reflections on Little Rock" (PDF). Dissent. Vol. 6, no. 6. pp. 45–56. Archived from the original (PDF) on 8 September 2017.
- — (Spring 1959). "A reply to critics". Dissent. Vol. 6, no. 7. pp. 179–81. Archived from the original on 4 August 2018.
- — (February–March 1963). "Eichmann in Jerusalem. 5 parts". The New Yorker. Archived from the original on 11 August 2018.
- — (21 October 1971). "Martin Heidegger at Eighty". New York Review of Books. Translated by Albert Hofstadter. p. 51. Archived from the original on 11 May 2020.

==== Correspondence ====
- Arendt, Hannah; Jaspers, Karl (1992). Köhler, Lotte; Saner, Hans (eds.). Hannah Correspondence, 1926–1969. Translated by Robert and Rita Kimber. New York: Harcourt Brace Jovanovich. ISBN 978-0-15-107887-5.
- Arendt, Hannah; Kazin, Alfred (February 2005). Mahrdt, Helgard (ed.). "The correspondence between Hannah Arendt and Alfred Kazin". Samtiden. No. 1. pp. 107–54. Archived from the original on 15 November 2021.
- Arendt, Hannah; McCarthy, Mary (1995). Brightman, Carol (ed.). Between friends: the correspondence of Hannah Arendt and Mary McCarthy, 1949–1975. Harcourt Brace. ISBN 978-0-15-100112-5.
- Arendt, Hannah; Blücher, Heinrich (2000) [1996]. Kohler, Lotte (ed.). Within Four Walls: The Correspondence Between Hannah Arendt and Heinrich Blücher, 1936–1968. Translated by Peter Constantine. Harcourt. ISBN 978-0-15-100303-7.
- Arendt, Hannah; Heidegger, Martin (2004) [1999 Klostermann]. Ludz, Ursula (ed.). Briefe 1925 bis 1975 und andere Zeugnisse [Letters, 1925–1975]. Translated by Andrew Shields. New York: Harcourt. ISBN 978-0-15-100525-3. Archived from the original on 3 December 2023.
  - Heidegger, Martin (24 April 1925). "This Day in Letters: Letter to Hannah Arendt". The American Reader. Archived from the original on 8 March 2021.
  - Lilla, Mark (18 November 1999). "Ménage à Trois". The New York Review of Books (review). Archived from the original on 3 March 2021.
  - Brightman, Carol (20 May 2004). "The Metaphysical Couple". The Nation (Review). Archived from the original on 3 April 2019.
- Arendt, Hannah; Benjamin, Walter (2006). Schöttker, Detlev; Wizisla, Erdmut (eds.). Arendt und Benjamin: Texte, Briefe, Dokumente (in German). Suhrkamp. ISBN 978-3-518-29395-9. Archived from the original on 3 December 2023.
- Arendt, Hannah; Anders, Günther (2016). Putz, Kerstin (ed.). Schreib doch mal 'hard facts' über dich: Briefe 1939 bis 1975 (in German). C.H.Beck. ISBN 978-3-406-69911-5. Archived from the original on 3 December 2023. (excerpts Archived 8 March 2021 at the Wayback Machine)
  - Magenau, Jörg (9 October 2016). "Die Geschiedenen: Die Frage ist, wie man überlebt: Der Briefwechsel zwischen Hannah Arendt und Günther Anders". Süddeutsche Zeitung (Review) (in German). Archived from the original on 12 September 2018.
- Arendt, Hannah (2017). Ludz, Ursula; Nordmann, Ingeborg (eds.). Wie ich einmal ohne Dich leben soll, mag ich mir nicht vorstellen: Briefwechsel mit den Freundinnen Charlotte Beradt, Rose Feitelson, Hilde Fränkel, Anne Weil-Mendelsohn und Helen Wolff (I do not like to imagine how I should live without you: correspondence with my friends) (in German). Piper ebooks. ISBN 978-3-492-97837-8. Archived from the original on 3 December 2023.
- Arendt, Hannah; Scholem, Gershom (2017) [2011]. Knott, Marie Louise (ed.). The Correspondence of Hannah Arendt and Gershom Scholem. Translated by Anthony David. University of Chicago Press. ISBN 978-0-226-92451-9. Archived from the original on 3 December 2023.
  - Aschheim, Steven E. (Winter 2011). "Between New York and Jerusalem". Jewish Review of Books (Review). Archived from the original on 13 August 2020.

==== Posthumous ====
- Arendt, Hannah (1981) [1978]. McCarthy, Mary (ed.). The Life of the Mind: The Groundbreaking Investigation on How We Think. New York: Harcourt Brace Jovanovich. ISBN 978-0-15-651992-2. Archived from the original on 3 December 2023. Online text at Pensar el Espacio Público Archived 13 January 2021 at the Wayback Machine
  - Mckenna, George (November 1978). "The Life of the Mind". The Journal of Politics (Review). 40 (4): 1086–88. doi:10.2307/2129914. JSTOR 2129914.
- — (1978). Feldman, Ron H (ed.). The Jew as Pariah: Jewish Identity and Politics in the Modern Age. Grove Press. ISBN 978-0-394-17042-8. Archived from the original on 3 December 2023.
  - — (1978a) [1943]. We refugees (PDF). Archived from the original (PDF) on 9 February 2019.
  - Botstein, Leon (1983). "The Jew as Pariah: Hannah Arendt's Political Philosophy". Dialectical Anthropology (Review). 8 (1/2): 47–73. doi:10.1007/bf00249042. JSTOR 29790091. S2CID 169475999.
  - Dannhauser, Werner J. (1 January 1979). "The Jew as Pariah, by Hannah Arendt, edited by Ron H. Feldman". Commentary (Review). Archived from the original on 25 February 2020.
- — (1992) [1982]. Beiner, Ronald (ed.). Lectures on Kant's Political Philosophy. University of Chicago Press. ISBN 978-0-226-23178-5. Archived from the original on 3 December 2023. Online text Archived 14 July 2020 at the Wayback Machine; text at the Internet Archive
- — (2002a). Ludz, Ursula; Nordmann, Ingeborg (eds.). Denktagebuch: 1950 bis 1973 (in German). Vol. 1. Piper. ISBN 978-3-492-04429-5.
- — (2002b). Ludz, Ursula; Nordmann, Ingeborg (eds.). Denktagebuch: 1950 bis 1973 (in German). Vol. 2. Piper. ISBN 978-3-492-04429-5.
- — (January 2000). Baehr, Peter (ed.). The Portable Hannah Arendt. Penguin Books. ISBN 978-0-14-026974-1. Full text on Internet Archive
- — (2011) [1994 Harcourt Brace & Company]. Kohn, Jerome (ed.). Essays in Understanding, 1930–1954: Formation, Exile, and Totalitarianism. Knopf Doubleday Publishing Group. ISBN 978-0-307-78703-3.
  - —; Gaus, Günter [in German] (2011a) [28 October 1964]. Was bleibt? Es bleibt die Muttersprache. Günter Gaus im Gespräch mit Hannah Arendt ["What remains? The Language remains": An interview with Günter Gaus]. Translated by Joan Stambaugh. pp. 1–23.
    - "Was bleibt? Es bleibt die Muttersprache". rbb fernsehen (in German). Rundfunk Berlin-Brandenburg. 28 October 1964. Archived from the original on 15 February 2020. (original German transcription)
  - Teichman, Jenny (April 1994). "Understanding Arendt". The New Criterion (Review).
- — (2005). Ludz, Ursula (ed.). Ich will verstehen: Selbstauskünfte zu Leben und Werk; mit einer vollständigen Bibliographie (in German). Piper. ISBN 978-3-492-24591-3.
  - —; Stern, Günther (2007m) [1930]. "Rilkes Duineser Elegien". Translated by Susannah Young-ah Gottlieb. pp. 1–23.
  - — (2007n) [1932]. "Adam-Müller-Renaissance?". pp. 38–45.
- — (2009b) [2003, Schocken]. Kohn, Jerome (ed.). Responsibility and Judgment. Knopf Doubleday Publishing Group. ISBN 978-0-307-54405-6.
  - — (1964), Personal responsibility under dictatorship (PDF), pp. 17–48, archived (PDF) from the original on 23 August 2018
- — (2009a) [2007 Schocken Books]. Kohn, Jerome; Feldman, Ron H (eds.). The Jewish Writings. Knopf Doubleday Publishing Group. ISBN 978-0-307-49628-7. at Pensar el Espacio Público Archived 13 January 2021 at the Wayback Machine
  - — (2009m) [1932]. The Enlightenment and the Jewish Question. Translated by John E. Woods. pp. 3–18.
  - — (2009n) [1944]. The Jew as Pariah: A Hidden Tradition. pp. 275–297.
  - Butler, Judith (10 May 2007). "'I merely belong to them': The Jewish Writings by Hannah Arendt, edited by Jerome Kohn and Ron Feldman 2007". London Review of Books (Review). Vol. 29, no. 9. pp. 26–28. ISSN 0260-9592. Archived from the original on 22 July 2018.
- — (2018). Kohn, Jerome (ed.). Thinking Without a Banister: Essays in Understanding, 1953–1975. Knopf Doubleday Publishing Group. ISBN 978-1-101-87030-3.
- Arendt, Hannah (2025b). Hill, Samantha Rose; Grill, Genese (eds.). What Remains: The Collected Poems of Hannah Arendt. Translated and edited. Liveright Publishing. ISBN 978-1-324-09053-3.

==== Collections ====
- "The Hannah Arendt Papers". Library of Congress. 2001. Archived from the original on 15 August 2018.
- "Hannah Arendt-Archiv" (in German). Institut für Philosophie: Carl von Ossietzky Universität Oldenburg. 2018.
- "Hannah Arendt (publications)". Internet Archive.

==== Miscellaneous ====
- Arendt, Hannah (2007b). Fischer-Defoy, Christine (ed.). Hannah Arendt: das private Adressbuch 1951–1975 (in German). Koehler & Amelang. ISBN 978-3-7338-0357-5.
  - Ludz, Ursula (May 2008b). "Gut gestaltet, unterhaltsam, aber nicht zuverlässig – das kürzlich erschienene Arendt-Adressbuch". HannahArendt.net (Review) (in German). 4 (1). doi:10.57773/hanet.v4i1.143. Archived from the original on 26 August 2018.
  - —; Fest, Joachim (9 November 1964). "Eichmann war von empörender Dummheit: Hannah Arendt im Gespräch mit Joachim Fest" [Eichmann was outrageously stupid: Hannah Arendt in conversation with Joachim Fest]. HannahArendt.net (in German and English). 3 (1). Translated by Andrew Brown. Germany: SWR TV. doi:10.57773/hanet.v3i1.114. Archived from the original on 18 February 2020. (Original video) Archived 15 February 2020 at the Wayback Machine
- — (18 April 1975a). "Sonning Prize acceptance speech". Miscellaneous Material. Copenhagen. Archived from the original on 18 April 2020., reprinted as the Prologue in Arendt (2009b, pp. 3–16)
- — (15 February – 10 March 1950). "Jewish Cultural Reconstruction Field Reports, 1948–1951, No. 18". Key Documents of German-Jewish History. Hamburg: Institut für die Geschichte der deutschen Juden (IGdJ), Deutsche Forschungsgemeinschaft (DFG). doi:10.23691/jgo:source-126.en.v1. Archived from the original on 15 April 2019.

== Views ==
In 1961, while covering the trial of Adolf Eichmann in Jerusalem, Arendt wrote a letter to Karl Jaspers that Adam Kirsch described as reflecting "pure racism" toward Sephardic Jews from the Middle East and Ashkenazi Jews from Eastern Europe. She wrote:

Fortunately, Eichmann's three judges were of German origin, indeed the best of German Jewry. [Attorney General Gideon] Hausner is a typical Galician Jew, still European, very unsympathetic... boring... constantly making mistakes. Probably one of those people who don't know any language. Everything is organized by a police force which gives me the creeps, speaks only Hebrew, and looks Arabic. Some downright brutal types among them. They would obey any order. And outside the doors, the oriental mob, as if one were in Istanbul or some other half-Asiatic country.

Although Arendt remained a Zionist both during and after World War II, she made it clear that she favored the creation of a Jewish-Arab federated state in the British Mandate of Palestine (now Israel and the Palestinian territories), rather than a purely Jewish state. She believed that this was a way to address Jewish statelessness and to avoid the pitfalls of nationalism. However, Hannah Arendt distanced herself from official Zionism in her article 'Der Zionismus aus heutiger Sicht' (Zionism reconsidered) where she criticized the drift of the Zionist movement after their Atlantic City Conference in November 1944, asserting that this was the triumph of the sectarian ideology of the most extreme Zionists.

=== Racism ===
It was not just Arendt's analysis of the Eichmann trial that drew accusations of racism. In her 1958 essay entitled Reflections on Little Rock she expressed opposition to desegregation following the 1957 Little Rock Integration Crisis in Arkansas. As she explains in the preface, for a long time the magazine Dissent, the essay's first publisher, was reluctant to print it, so far did it appear to differ from the publication's liberal values. Eventually it was printed alongside critical responses. Later The New Yorker would express similar hesitancy over the Eichmann papers. So vehement was the response that Arendt felt obliged to defend herself in a sequel. The debate over this essay has continued since. William Simmons devotes a whole section of his 2011 text on human rights (Human Rights Law and the Marginalized Other) to a critique of Arendt's position and in particular on Little Rock. While many critics feel she was fundamentally racist, many of those who have defended Arendt's position have pointed out that her concerns were for the welfare of the children, a position she maintained throughout her life. She felt that white children were being thrown into a racially disharmonious "jungle" to serve a broader political strategy of forcible integration.

While over time Arendt conceded some ground to her critics, namely that she argued as an outsider, she remained committed to her central critique that children should not be thrust into the front-lines of political conflicts. In Reflections on Little Rock, she wrote:

To force parents to send their children to an integrated school against their will means to deprive them of rights which clearly belong to them in all free societies-the private right over their children and the social right to free association. As for the children, forced integration means a very serious conflict between home and school, between their private and their social life, and while such conflicts are common in adult life, children cannot be expected to handle them and therefore should not be exposed to them.

She also believed desegregation was an overreach of government authority, stating "The conflict between a segregated home and a desegregated school, between family prejudice and school demands, abolishes at one stroke both the teachers' and the parents' authority, replacing it with the rule of public opinion among children who have neither the ability nor the right to establish a public opinion of their own."

=== Feminism ===
Embraced by feminists as a pioneer in a world dominated by men, Arendt did not consider herself a feminist, remaining opposed to the social dimensions of Women's Liberation, urging independence, but always keeping in mind Vive la petite différence! On becoming the first woman to be appointed a professor at Princeton in 1953, the media were much engaged in this exceptional achievement, but she never wanted to be seen as an exception, either as a woman (an "exception woman") or a Jew, stating emphatically "I am not disturbed at all about being a woman professor, because I am quite used to being a woman". In 1972, discussing women's liberation, she observed "the real question to ask is, what will we lose if we win?". She rather enjoyed what she saw as the privileges of being feminine as opposed to feminist, "intensely feminine and therefore no feminist", stated Hans Jonas. Arendt considered some professions and positions unsuitable for women, particularly those involving leadership, telling Günter Gaus "It just doesn't look good when a woman gives orders". Despite these views, and having been labelled "anti-feminist", much space has been devoted to examining Arendt's place in relation to feminism. In the last years of her life, Virginia Held noted that Arendt's views evolved with the emergence of a new feminism in America in the 1970s to recognize the importance of the women's movement.

=== Critique of human rights ===
In The Origins of Totalitarianism, Hannah Arendt devotes a lengthy chapter (The Decline of the Nation-State and the End of the Rights of Man) to a critical analysis of human rights, in what has been described as "the most widely read essay on refugees ever published". Arendt is not skeptical of the notion of political rights in general, but instead defends a national or civil conception of rights. Human rights, or the Rights of Man as they were commonly called, are universal, inalienable, and possessed simply by virtue of being human. In contrast, civil rights are possessed by virtue of belonging to a political community, most commonly by being a citizen. Arendt's primary criticism of human rights is that they are ineffectual and illusory because their enforcement is in tension with national sovereignty. She argued that since there is no political authority above that of sovereign nations, state governments have little incentive to respect human rights when such policies conflict with national interests. This can be seen most clearly by examining the treatment of refugees and other stateless people. Since the refugee has no state to secure their civil rights, the only rights they have to fall back on are human rights. In this way Arendt uses the refugee as a test case for examining human rights in isolation from civil rights.

Arendt's analysis draws on the refugee upheavals in the first half of the 20th century along with her own experience as a refugee fleeing Nazi Germany. She argued that as state governments began to emphasize national identity as a prerequisite for full legal status, the number of minority resident aliens increased along with the number of stateless persons whom no state was willing to recognize legally. The two potential solutions to the refugee problem, repatriation and naturalization, both proved incapable of solving the crisis. Arendt argued that repatriation failed to solve the refugee crisis because no government was willing to take them in and claim them as their own. When refugees were forcibly deported to neighboring countries, such immigration was deemed illegal by the receiving country, and so failed to change the fundamental status of the migrants as stateless. Attempts at naturalizing and assimilating refugees also had little success. This failure was primarily the result of resistance from both state governments and the majority of citizens, since both tended to see the refugees as undesirables who threatened their national identity. Resistance to naturalization also came from the refugees themselves who resisted assimilation and attempted to maintain their own ethnic and national identities. Arendt contends that neither naturalization nor the tradition of asylum was capable of handling the sheer number of refugees. Instead of accepting some refugees with legal status, the state often responded by denaturalizing minorities who shared national or ethnic ties with stateless refugees.

Arendt argues that the consistent mistreatment of refugees, most of whom were placed in internment camps, is evidence against the existence of human rights. If the notion of human rights as universal and inalienable is to be taken seriously, the rights must be realizable given the features of the modern liberal state. She concluded "The Rights of Man, supposedly inalienable, proved to be unenforceable–even in countries whose constitutions were based upon them–whenever people appeared who were no longer citizens of any sovereign state". Arendt contends that they are not realizable because they are in tension with at least one feature of the liberal state—national sovereignty. One of the primary ways in which a nation exercises sovereignty is through control over national borders. State governments consistently grant their citizens free movement to traverse national borders. In contrast, the movement of refugees is often restricted in the name of national interests. This restriction presents a dilemma for liberalism because liberal theorists typically are committed to both human rights and the existence of sovereign nations.

In one of her most quoted passages, she puts forward the concept that human rights are little more than an abstraction:

The conception of human rights based upon the assumed existence of a human being as such broke down at the very moment when those who professed to believe in it were for the first time confronted with people who had indeed lost all other qualities and specific relationships – except that they were still human. The world found nothing sacred in the abstract nakedness of being human.

=== Lying in politics ===
Arendt explored the effects of systemic lying on society. In her 1972 essay "Lying in Politics...", she discussed how organized falsehood can lead to a situation where the distinction between truth and falsehood blurs, resulting in a populace that becomes skeptical of everything. Systemic lying is not aimed at making people believe a lie so much as making it hard to believe anything. People who can no longer distinguish between truth and lies on their own, cannot distinguish between right and wrong on their own.

"The result of a consistent and total substitution of lies for factual truth is not that the lies will now be accepted as truth, and the truth be defamed as lies, but that the sense by which we take our bearings in the real world... is being destroyed."

Also in The Origins of Totalitarianism, Arendt wrote about lying in politics, "The totalitarian mass leaders based their propaganda on the correct psychological assumption" that, upon learning that they had been lied to, an audience made cynical by habitual lies "would protest that they had known all along that the statement was a lie and would admire the leaders for their superior tactical cleverness."

== In popular culture ==
Several authors have written biographies that focus on the relationship between Hannah Arendt and Martin Heidegger. In 1999, the French feminist philosopher Catherine Clément wrote a novel, Martin and Hannah, speculating on the triangular relationship between Heidegger and the two women in his life, Arendt and Heidegger's wife Elfriede Petri. In addition to the relationships, the novel is a serious exploration of philosophical ideas, that centers on Arendt's last meeting with Heidegger in Freiburg in 1975. The scene is based on Elisabeth Young-Bruehl's description in Hannah Arendt: For Love of the World (1982), but reaches back to their childhoods, and Heidegger's role in encouraging the relationship between the two women. The novel explores Heidegger's embrace of Nazism as a proxy for that of Germany and, as in Arendt's treatment of Eichmann, the difficult relationship between collective guilt and personal responsibility.

In 2012 the German film, Hannah Arendt, directed by Margarethe von Trotta was released. The film, with Barbara Sukowa in the title role, depicted the controversy over Arendt's coverage of the Eichmann trial in The New Yorker and her subsequent book, Eichmann in Jerusalem: A Report on the Banality of Evil, in which she was widely misunderstood as defending Eichmann and blaming Jewish leaders for the Holocaust. In 2015, the filmmaker Ada Ushpiz produced a documentary on Hannah Arendt, Vita Activa: The Spirit of Hannah Arendt. In the 2023 TV series Transatlantic, Arendt is portrayed by Alexa Karolinski. In the 2025 documentary Hannah Arendt: Facing Tyranny, she is portrayed by Nina Hoss. Arendt is a major character in Madeliene Thien's 2025 novel Book of Records.

== Legacy ==
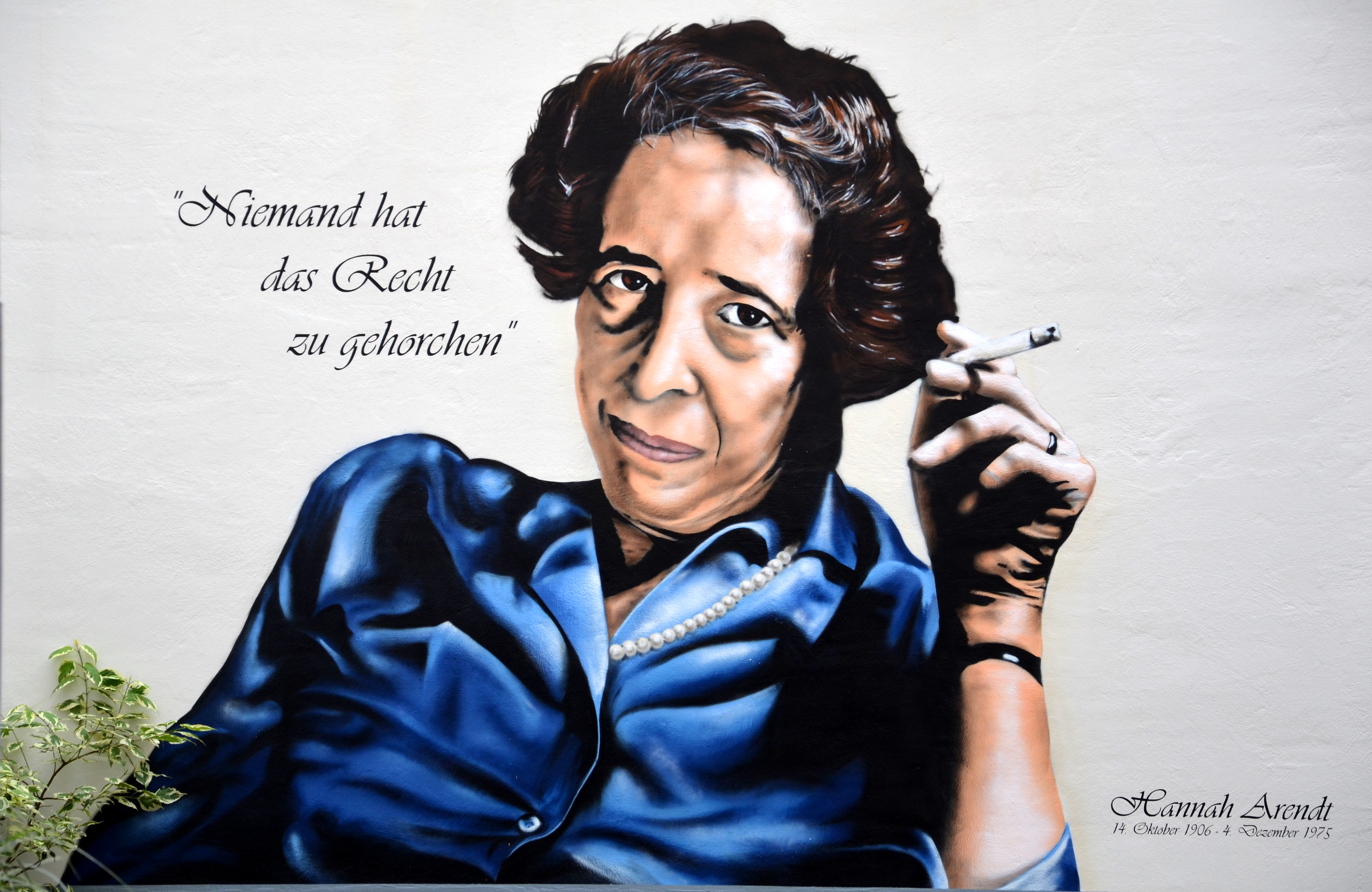
"Nobody has the right to obey" – portrait of Hannah Arendt on a wall of her birthplace in Hannover, Germany

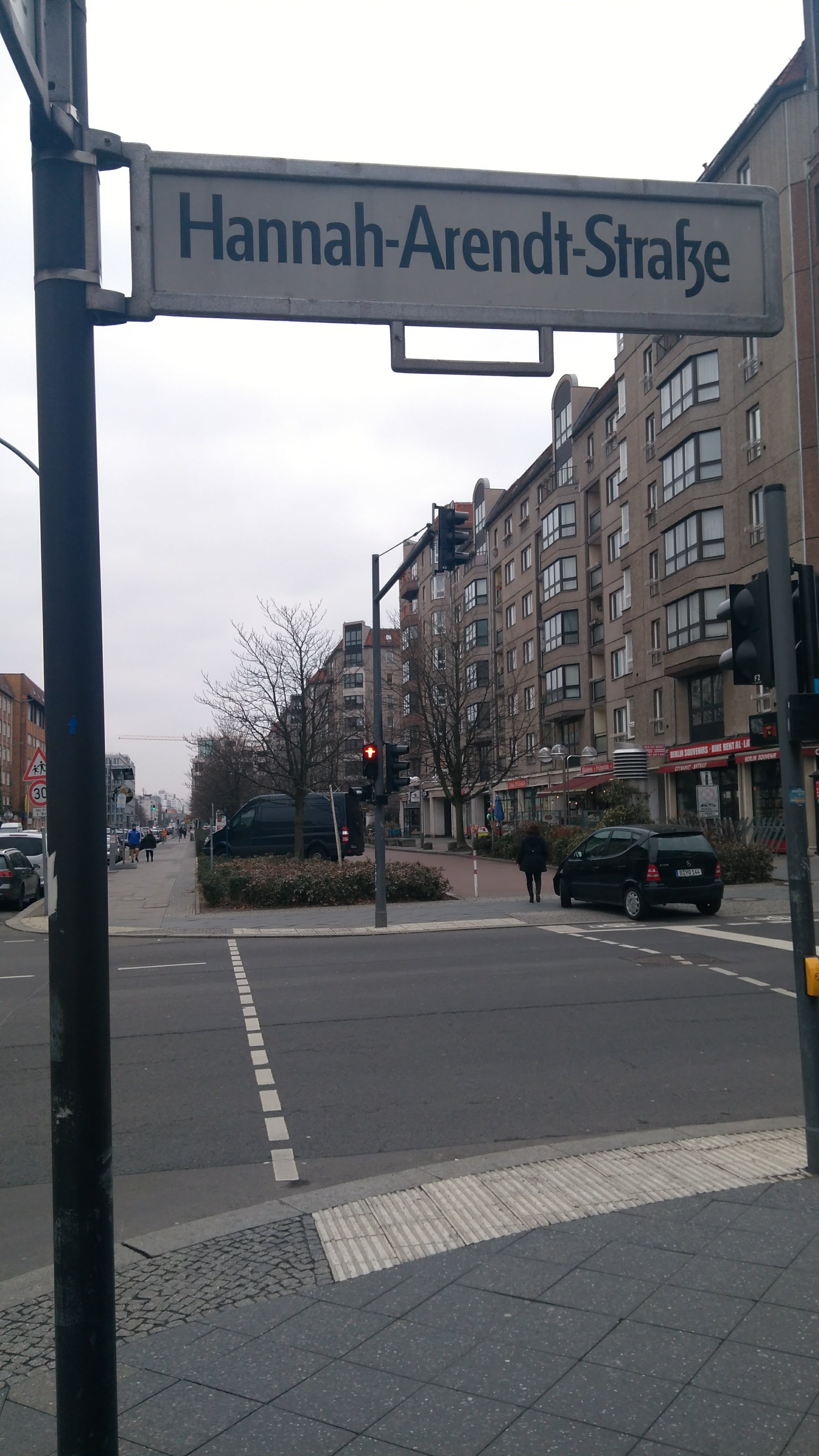
Hannah-Arendt-Straße in Berlin

Hannah Arendt is considered one of the most influential political philosophers of the 20th century. In 1998 Walter Laqueur stated "No twentieth-century philosopher and political thinker has at the present time as wide an echo", as philosopher, historian, sociologist and also journalist. Arendt's legacy has been described as a cult. In a 2016 review of a documentary about Arendt, the journalist A. O. Scott describes Hannah Arendt as "of unmatched range and rigor" as a thinker, although she is primarily known for the series of articles known as Eichmann in Jerusalem that she wrote for The New Yorker, and in particular for the one phrase "the banality of evil".

She shunned publicity, never expecting, as she explained to Karl Jaspers in 1951, to see herself as a "cover girl" on the newsstands. (Note: Letter to Jaspers 14 May 1951. Her image appeared on the cover of the Saturday Review of Literature on Saturday, 24 March 1951 (see image), shortly after the publication of The Origins of Totalitarianism. She also appeared on Time and Newsweek in the same week) In Germany, there are tours available of sites associated with her life.

The study of the life and work of Arendt, and of her political and philosophical theory is described as Arendtian. In her will she established the Hannah Arendt Bluecher Literary Trust as the custodian of her writings and photographs. Her personal library was deposited at Bard College at the Stevenson Library in 1976, and includes approximately 5,000 books, ephemera, and pamphlets from Arendt's collection as well as her writing desk from her last apartment in New York. Most of her papers were deposited at the Library of Congress and her correspondence with her German friends and mentors, such as Heidegger, Blumenfeld and Jaspers, at the Deutsches Literaturarchiv in Marbach. The Library of Congress listed more than 50 books written about her in 1998, and that number has continued to grow, as have the number of scholarly articles, estimated as 1000 at that time.

Her life and work is recognized by the institutions most closely associated with her teaching, by the creation of Hannah Arendt Centers at both Bard (Hannah Arendt Center for Politics and Humanities) and The New School, both in New York State. In Germany, her contributions to understanding authoritarianism is recognised by the Hannah-Arendt-Institut für Totalitarismusforschung (Hannah Arendt Institute for the Research on Totalitarianism) in Dresden. There are Hannah Arendt Associations (Hannah Arendt Verein) such as the Hannah Arendt Verein für politisches Denken in Bremen that awards the annual Hannah-Arendt-Preis für politisches Denken (Hannah Arendt Prize for Political Thinking) established in 1995. In Oldenburg, the Hannah Arendt Center at Carl von Ossietzky University was established in 1999, and holds a large collection of her work (Hannah Arendt Archiv), and administers the internet portal HannahArendt.net (A Journal for Political Thinking) as well as a monograph series, the Hannah Arendt-Studien. In Italy, the Hannah Arendt Center for Political Studies is situated at the University of Verona.

In 2017 a journal, Arendt Studies, was launched to publish articles related to the study of her life, work, and legacy. Many places associated with her, have memorabilia of her on display, such as her student card at the University of Heidelberg. 2006, the centennial of her birth, saw commemorations of her work in conferences and celebrations around the world. There is also a Hannah Arendt Day (Hannah Arendt Tag) in her birthplace.

Of the many photographic portraits of Arendt, that taken in 1944 by Fred Stein (see image), whose work she greatly admired, (Note: Arendt wrote to Stein "It is my honest opinion that you are one of the best portrait photographers of the present day") has become iconic, and has been described as better known than the photographer himself, having appeared on a German postage stamp. Among organizations that have recognized Arendt's contributions to civilization and human rights, is the United Nations Refugee Agency (UNHCR).

According to Frances Stonor Saunders’s landmark investigative book, Who Paid the Piper, the CIA claims that Arendt’s work was directly promoted by their anti-communist project, the Cultural Congress for Freedom (CCF). In response to claims of ignorance of the Agency’s support by Arendt and other top Western intellectuals, leading official Lawrence de Neufville said in a February 1997 phone interview, “Who didn’t know, I’d like to know? It was a pretty open secret.”

=== Continuing interest ===
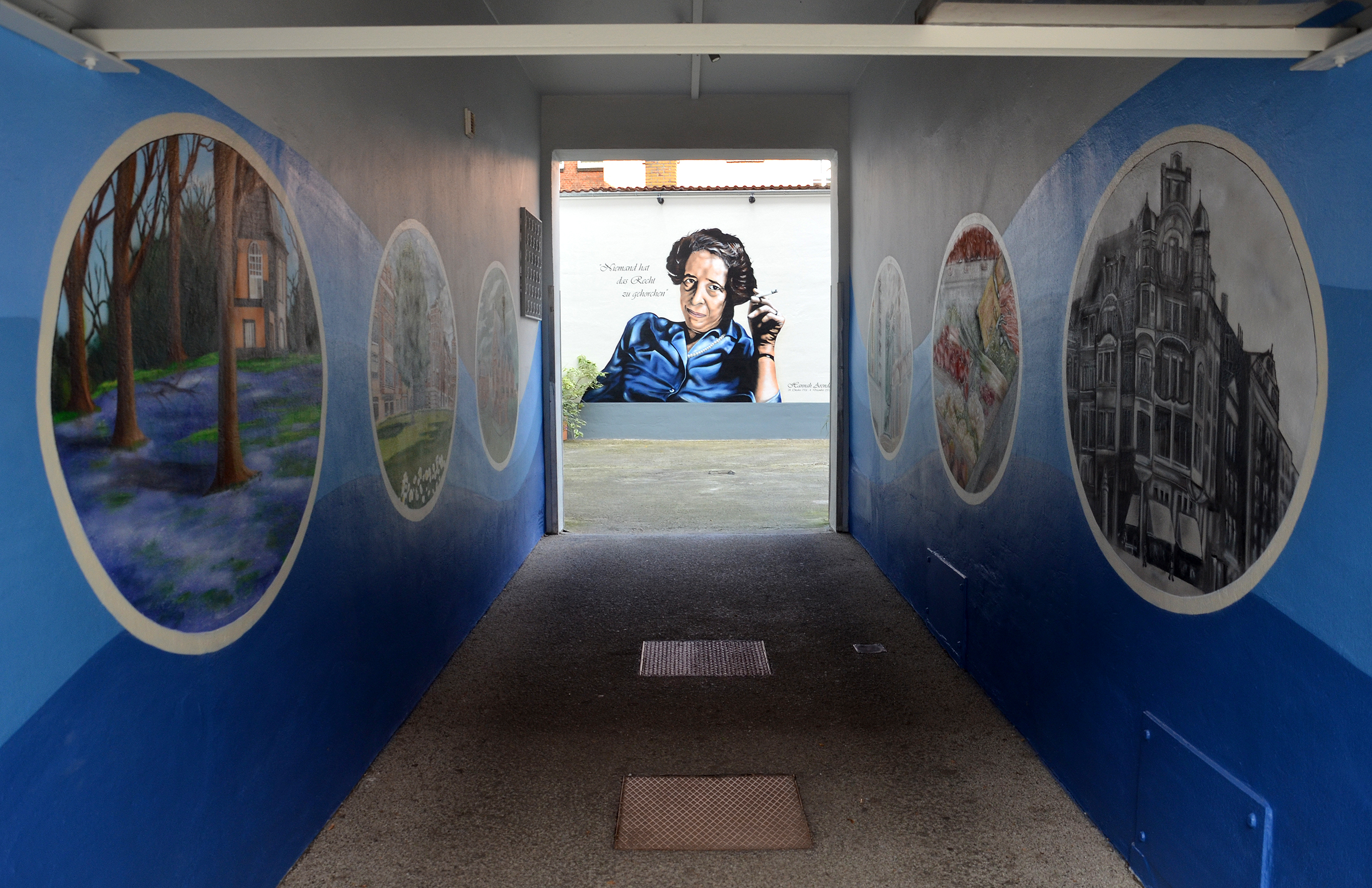
Courtyard of Arendt's house in Linden-Mitte

The rise of nativism, such as the election of Donald Trump in the United States, and concerns regarding an increasingly authoritarian style of governance has led to a surge of interest in Arendt and her writings, including radio broadcasts and writers, including Jeremy Adelman and Zoe Williams, to revisit Arendt's ideas to seek the extent to which they inform our understanding of such movements, which are being described as "Dark Times". At the same time Amazon reported that it had sold out of copies of The Origins of Totalitarianism (1951). Michiko Kakutani, in her 2018 book The Death of Truth: Notes on Falsehood in the Age of Trump, argues that the rise of totalitarianism has been founded on the violation of truth. She begins her book with an extensive quote from The Origins of Totalitarianism:

The ideal subject of totalitarian rule is not the convinced Nazi or the convinced communist, but people for whom the distinction between fact and fiction (i.e., the reality of experience) and the distinction between true and false (i.e., the standards of thought) no longer exist.

Kakutani and others believed that Arendt's words speak not just events of a previous century but apply equally to the contemporary cultural landscape populated with fake news and lies. She also draws on Arendt's essay "Lying in Politics" from Crises in the Republic pointing to the lines:

The historian knows how vulnerable is the whole texture of facts in which we spend our daily life; it is always in danger of being perforated by single lies or torn to shreds by the organized lying of groups, nations, or classes, or denied and distorted, often carefully covered up by reams of falsehoods or simply allowed to fall into oblivion. Facts need testimony to be remembered and trustworthy witnesses to be established in order to find a secure dwelling place in the domain of human affairs

Arendt drew attention to the critical role that propaganda plays in gaslighting populations, Kakutani observes, citing the passage:

In an ever-changing, incomprehensible world the masses had reached the point where they would, at the same time, believe everything and nothing, think that everything was possible and that nothing was true . ... The totalitarian mass leaders based their propaganda on the correct psychological assumption that, under such conditions, one could make people believe the most fantastic statements one day, and trust that if the next day they were given irrefutable proof of their falsehood, they would take refuge in cynicism; instead of deserting the leaders who had lied to them, they would protest that they had known all along that the statement was a lie and would admire the leaders for their superior tactical cleverness

Arendt took a broader perspective on history than merely totalitarianism in the early 20th century, stating "the deliberate falsehood and the outright lie have been used as legitimate means to achieve political ends since the beginning of recorded history." Contemporary relevance is also reflected in the increasing use of the phrase, attributed to her, "No one has the right to obey" to reflect that actions result from choices, and hence judgement, and that we cannot disclaim responsibility for that which we have the power to act upon. In addition those centers established to promote Arendtian studies continue to seek solutions to a wide range of contemporary issues in her writing.

Arendt's teachings on obedience have also been linked to the controversial psychology experiments by Stanley Milgram, that implied that ordinary people can easily be induced to commit atrocities. Milgram himself drew attention to this in 1974, stating that he was testing the theory that Eichmann like others would merely follow orders, but unlike Milgram she argued that actions involve responsibility.

Arendt's theories on the political consequences of how nations deal with refugees have remained relevant and compelling. Arendt had observed first hand the displacement of large stateless and rightless populations, treated not so much as people in need than as problems to solve, and in many cases, resist. She wrote about this in her 1943 essay "We refugees". Another Arendtian theme that finds an echo in contemporary society is her observation, inspired by Rilke, of the despair of not being heard, the futility of tragedy that finds no listener that can bring comfort, assurance and intervention – a notable example being gun violence in America and the political inaction regarding it.

In Search of the Last Agora, an illustrated documentary film by Lebanese director Rayyan Dabbous about Arendt's 1958 work The Human Condition, was released in 2018 to mark the book's 50th anniversary. The experimental film is described as finding "new meaning in the political theorist's conceptions of politics, technology and society in the 1950s".

== See also ==
- American philosophy
- German philosophy
- Hannah Arendt Award
- List of refugees
- List of women philosophers
- Post-truth
- Women in philosophy

== Works cited ==
=== Articles (journals and proceedings) ===
- Allen, Wayne F. (1 July 1982). "Hannah Arendt: existential phenomenology and political freedom". Philosophy & Social Criticism. 9 (2): 170–190. doi:10.1177/019145378200900203. S2CID 145329906. Archived from the original on 15 October 2021.
- Bagchi, Barnita (January 2007). "Hannah Arendt, Education, and Liberation: A Comparative South Asian Feminist Perspective". Heidelberg Papers in South Asian and Comparative Politics (35).
- Balber, Samantha (2017). "Hannah Arendt: A Conscious Pariah and Her People". Footnotes. 1: 165–183. Archived from the original on 15 February 2020.
- Benhabib, Seyla (1995). "The Pariah and Her Shadow: Hannah Arendt's Biography of Rahel Varnhagen". Political Theory. 23 (1): 5–24. doi:10.1177/0090591795023001002. JSTOR 192171. S2CID 144497322.
- Burroughs, Michael D (2015). "Hannah Arendt, 'Reflections on Little Rock,' and White Ignorance". Critical Philosophy of Race. 3 (1): 52–78. doi:10.5325/critphilrace.3.1.0052. S2CID 144235220.
- Calcagno, Antonio (January 2013). "The Desire For And Pleasure Of Evil: The Augustinian Limitations Of Arendtian Mind". The Heythrop Journal. 54 (1): 89–100. doi:10.1111/j.1468-2265.2009.00513.x.
- Jonas, Hans (2006) [2003]. "Hannah Arendt: An Intimate Portrait". New England Review. 27 (2). Translated by Brian Fox and Richard Wolin: 133–142. JSTOR 40244828.
- Laqueur, Walter (1998). "The Arendt Cult: Hannah Arendt as Political Commentator". Journal of Contemporary History. 33 (4): 483–496. doi:10.1177/002200949803300401. JSTOR 260982. S2CID 154222580., reprinted in Aschheim (2001, pp. 47–64)
- Lebeau, Vicky (29 June 2016). "The Unwelcome Child: Elizabeth Eckford and Hannah Arendt". Journal of Visual Culture. 3 (1): 51–62. doi:10.1177/1470412904043598. S2CID 145198758. Archived from the original on 16 October 2021.
- Maier-Katkin, Daniel (November 2011). "The Reception of Hannah Arendt's Eichmann in Jerusalem in the United States 1963–2011". HannahArendt.net. 6 (1). doi:10.57773/hanet.v6i1/2.64. Archived from the original on 20 October 2017.
- Markus, Maria (1987). "The 'Anti-Feminism' of Hannah Arendt". Thesis Eleven. 17 (1): 76–87. doi:10.1177/072551368701700106. S2CID 145642201.
- Momigliano, Arnaldo (1980). "A Note on Max Weber's Definition of Judaism as a Pariah-Religion". History and Theory. 19 (3): 313–318. doi:10.2307/2504547. JSTOR 2504547.
- Morey, Maribel (20 December 2011). "Reassessing Hannah Arendt's 'Reflections on Little Rock' (1959)". Law, Culture and the Humanities. 10 (1): 88–110. doi:10.1177/1743872111423795. S2CID 144635339. SSRN 966657.
- Pickett, Adrienne (2009). "Images, Dialogue, and Aesthetic Education: Arendt's response to the Little Rock Crisis" (PDF). Philosophical Studies in Education. 40: 188–199. Archived (PDF) from the original on 15 May 2016.
- Ray, Larry; Diemling, Maria (24 July 2016). "Arendt's 'conscious pariah' and the ambiguous figure of the subaltern" (PDF). European Journal of Social Theory. 19 (4): 503–520. doi:10.1177/1368431016628261. S2CID 147139630. Archived (PDF) from the original on 20 July 2018.
- Riepl-Schmidt, Mascha (15 February 2005). "Henriette Arendt". HannahArendt.net (in German). 1 (1). doi:10.57773/hanet.v1i1.87. ISSN 1869-5787. Archived from the original on 19 July 2020.
- Rosenberg, Elissa (February 2012). "Walking in the city: memory and place". The Journal of Architecture. 17 (1): 131–149. doi:10.1080/13602365.2012.659914. S2CID 144753542.
- Saussy, Haun (2013). "The Refugee Speaks of Parvenus and Their Beautiful Illusions: A Rediscovered 1934 Text by Hannah Arendt". Critical Inquiry. 40 (1): 1–14. doi:10.1086/673223. S2CID 162242781.
- Schroeder, Steven (2002). "Review of 'Martin and Hannah: A Novel'". Essays in Philosophy (Review). 3 (1). ISSN 1526-0569. Archived from the original on 15 February 2020.
- Schuler-Springorum, Stefanie (1 June 1999). "Assimilation and Community Reconsidered: The Jewish Community in Konigsberg, 1871-1914". Jewish Social Studies. 5 (3): 104–131. doi:10.1353/jss.1999.0008. ISSN 1527-2028. S2CID 201796942.
- Szécsényi, Endre (30 March 2005). The Hungarian Revolution in the 'Reflections' by Hannah Arendt. Europe or the Globe? Eastern European Trajectories in Times of Integration and Globalization. Vienna: IWM. Archived from the original on 8 April 2022.
- Teixeira, Christina Heine (September 2006). "Wartesaal Lissabon 1941: Hannah Arendt und Heinrich Blücher". HannahArendt.net. 1 (2). doi:10.57773/hanet.v2i1.99. Archived from the original on 13 July 2020.
- Villa, Dana (2009). "Hannah Arendt, 1906-1975". The Review of Politics. 71 (1): 20–36. doi:10.1017/S0034670509000035. JSTOR 25655783. S2CID 148198536.
- Wellmer, Albrecht (1999). "Hannah Arendt On Revolution". Revue Internationale de Philosophie. 53 (208 (2)): 207–222. JSTOR 23955552.

==== Rahel Varnhagen ====
- Cutting-Gray, Joanne (1991). "Hannah Arendt's Rahel Varnhagen". Philosophy and Literature. 15 (2): 229–245. doi:10.1353/phl.1991.0023. S2CID 170122103.
- Goldstein, Donald J. (Spring 2009). "Hannah Arendt's Shared Destiny with Rahel Varnhagen". Women in Judaism. 6 (1): 18. Archived from the original on 15 February 2020.
- Zebadúa Yáñez, Verónica (2018). "Reading the Lives of Others: Biography as Political Thought in Hannah Arendt and Simone de Beauvoir". Hypatia. 33 (1): 94–110. doi:10.1111/hypa.12383. ISSN 0887-5367. S2CID 232175146.

==== Special issues and proceedings ====
- Ojakangas, Mika (2010a). "Arendt, Socrates, and the Ethics of Conscience" (PDF). Studies across Disciplines in the Humanities and Social Sciences. Vol. 8. pp. 67–85. Archived (PDF) from the original on 26 September 2020.
- Durst, Margarete (2004). Birth and Natality in Hannah Arendt. Springer. pp. 777–797. ISBN 978-94-010-0047-5.
- "Hannah Arendt". Social Research (Special issue). 44 (1). Spring 1977. JSTOR i40043622.

=== Audiovisual ===
- Berkowitz, Roger (2013). Hannah Arendt: A brief biography (DVD liner notes to Hannah Arendt). Zeitgeist Films.
- BBFC (2013). Hannah Arendt. Releases (Film) (in German, English, and Hebrew). British Board of Film Classification. Archived from the original on 15 February 2020.
  - BBFC (2012). Hannah Arendt (Film) (in German, English, and Hebrew). Archived from the original on 15 February 2020. (see also Hannah Arendt)
  - Weigel, Moira (16 July 2013). "Heritage Girl Crush: On 'Hannah Arendt'". Los Angeles Review of Books (Review). Archived from the original on 19 August 2018.
- Bragg, Melvyn; Stonebridge, Lyndsey; Sheffield, Frisbee; Eaglestone, Robert (2 February 2017). Hannah Arendt (Radio panel discussion). In Our Time. Radio 4. Archived from the original on 16 October 2018.
- Zeitgeist (2015). Vita Activa – The Spirit of Hannah Arendt (Documentary) (Film) (in German, English, and Hebrew). Zeitgeist Films. Archived from the original on 16 March 2020.
  - Scott, A. O. (5 April 2016). "Review: In 'Vita Activa: The Spirit of Hannah Arendt,' a Thinker More Relevant Than Ever". The New York Times (Review). Archived from the original on 23 May 2020.

=== Books and monographs ===
- Adamson, Jane; Freadman, Richard; Parker, David, eds. (1998). Renegotiating Ethics in Literature, Philosophy, and Theory. Cambridge University Press. ISBN 978-0-521-62938-6.
- Baier, Annette (1995). Moral Prejudices: Essays on Ethics. Harvard University Press. ISBN 978-0-674-58716-8.
  - "Ethics in many different voices" pp. 247–268, see also revised versions as Baier (1998, pp. 247–268) and Baier (1997, pp. 325–346)
- Bernstein, Richard J. (2018). Why Read Hannah Arendt Now?. Wiley. ISBN 978-1-5095-2863-9.
- Clément, Catherine (2001) [1999 Calmann-Lévy]. Martin et Hannah [Martin and Hannah: A Novel]. Translated by Julia Shirek Smith. Prometheus Books. ISBN 978-1-57392-906-6.
- Copjec, Joan, ed. (1996). Radical Evil. Verso. ISBN 978-1-85984-911-8.
- Ellis, Marc H., Encountering the Jewish Future: With Elie Wiesel, Martin Buber, Abraham Joshua Heschel, Hannah Arendt, Emmanuel Levinas. Minneapolis : Fortress Press, 2011.
- Gellhorn, Martha (1988). The View from the Ground. Atlantic Monthly Press. ISBN 978-0-8021-9117-5.
- Hattem, Cornelis Van; Hattem, Kees van (2005). Superfluous people: a reflection on Hannah Arendt and evil. University Press of America. ISBN 978-0-7618-3304-8.
- Kakutani, Michiko (2018). The Death of Truth: Notes on Falsehood in the Age of Trump. Crown/Archetype. ISBN 978-0-525-57484-2.
  - Hayes, Chris (18 July 2018). "Michiko Kakutani's Book About Our Post-Truth Era". The New York Times (Review). Archived from the original on 4 September 2018.
- Kielmansegg, Peter Graf; Mewes, Horst; Glaser-Schmidt, Elisabeth, eds. (1997). Hannah Arendt and Leo Strauss: German Émigrés and American Political Thought After World War II. Cambridge University Press. ISBN 978-0-521-59936-8. Archived from the original on 3 December 2023.
- Lamey, Andy (2011). Frontier Justice: The Global Refugee Crisis and What To Do About It. Doubleday Canada. ISBN 978-0-307-36792-1.
- Mihaely, Zohar (2022). Hannah Arendt and the Crisis of Israeli Democracy. Pickwick Publications. ISBN 978-1-666-79767-1.
- Mihaely, Zohar (2024). Man Confronts Himself Alone: Hannah Arendt and the Entanglements of Science, Technology, Economics, and Politics in Modern Life. Wipf & Stock Publications, Eugene, Oregon.
- Milgram, Stanley (2017) [1974]. Obedience to Authority. HarperCollins. ISBN 978-0-06-280340-5. (see also Obedience to Authority)
- Most, Stephen (2017). Stories Make the World: Reflections on Storytelling and the Art of the Documentary. New York: Berghahn Books.
- Oatley, Keith (2018). Our Minds, Our Selves: A Brief History of Psychology. Princeton University Press. ISBN 978-1-4008-9004-0.
- Richter, William L., ed. (2009). Approaches to Political Thought. Rowman & Littlefield Publishers. ISBN 978-1-4616-3656-4.
- Robinson, Marc, ed. (1996). Altogether Elsewhere: Writers on Exile. Harcourt Brace. ISBN 978-0-15-600389-6.
- Simmons, William Paul (2011). Human Rights Law and the Marginalized Other. Cambridge University Press. ISBN 978-1-139-50326-6.
  - Simmons, William Paul (2011), Arendt, Little Rock, and the Cauterization of the Marginalized Other (PDF) (Essay), archived (PDF) from the original on 4 August 2018
- Swedberg, Richard; Agevall, Ola (2016). The Max Weber Dictionary: Key Words and Central Concepts (2nd ed.). Stanford University Press. ISBN 978-1-5036-0022-5.
- Weber, Hermann; Drabkin, Jakov; Bayerlein, Bernhard H., eds. (2014). Deutschland, Russland, Komintern. II Dokumente (1918–1943): Nach der Archivrevolution: Neuerschlossene Quellen zu der Geschichte der KPD und den deutsch-russischen Beziehungen [Germany, Russia, Comintern. II Documents (1918–1943): After the Archive Revolution: New sources on the history of the KPD and German-Russian relations]. Berlin: Walter de Gruyter GmbH & Co KG. ISBN 978-3-11-033978-9.

==== Autobiography and biography ====
- AAAS (2018). Book of members, 1780 – present: A (PDF). Cambridge MA: American Academy of Arts and Sciences. p. 18. Archived (PDF) from the original on 17 December 2014.
- Anders, Günther (2011). Oberschlick, Gerhard (ed.). Die Kirschenschlacht: Dialoge mit Hannah Arendt und ein akademisches Nachwort [The cherry battle: dialogues with Hannah Arendt and an academic epilogue]. C.H.Beck. ISBN 978-3-406-63278-5.
  - Berkowitz, Roger (13 February 2012a). "The Cherry Battle". Amor Mundi (review). Hannah Arendt Center for Politics and Humanities; Bard College. Archived from the original on 14 April 2021.
- Ettinger, Elzbieta (1997) [1995]. Hannah Arendt/Martin Heidegger. Yale University Press. ISBN 978-0-300-07254-9.
  - Brent, Frances (30 May 2013). "Arendt's Affair". Tablet (Review). Archived from the original on 10 April 2019.
- Grunenberg, Antonia (2003). Arendt (in German). Freiburg: Herder. ISBN 978-3-451-04954-5. Archived from the original on 3 December 2023.
- — (2017). Hannah Arendt and Martin Heidegger: History of a Love. Indiana University Press. ISBN 978-0-253-02718-4. Archived from the original on 3 December 2023.
- Heller, Anne Conover (2015). Hannah Arendt: A Life in Dark Times. Houghton Mifflin Harcourt. ISBN 978-0-544-45619-8. excerpt Archived 9 August 2020 at the Wayback Machine
- Hill, Samantha Rose (2021). Hannah Arendt. Reaktion Books. ISBN 978-1-78914-379-9.
- Honig, Bonnie, ed. (2010) [1995]. Feminist Interpretations of Hannah Arendt. Penn State Press. ISBN 978-0-271-04320-3.
- Howe, Irving (1984) [1982]. A Margin of Hope: An Intellectual Autobiography. Harcourt, Brace, Jovanovich. ISBN 978-0-15-657245-3.
- Kristeva, Julia (2001a). Hannah Arendt. Translated by Ross Guberman. Columbia University Press. ISBN 978-0-231-12102-6.
- Maier-Katkin, Daniel (2010a). Stranger from Abroad: Hannah Arendt, Martin Heidegger, Friendship and Forgiveness. W. W. Norton. ISBN 978-0-393-07731-5.
- May, Derwent (1986). Hannah Arendt. Penguin Books. ISBN 978-0-14-008116-9.
- Meyer, Thomas, translated by Shelley Frisch (2026). Hannah Arendt: A Life of the Mind. Penguin Press.
- Nixon, Jon (2015). Hannah Arendt and the Politics of Friendship. Bloomsbury Publishing. ISBN 978-1-4725-0754-9.
- Stangneth, Bettina (2014). Eichmann Before Jerusalem: The Unexamined Life of a Mass Murderer. Knopf Doubleday Publishing Group. ISBN 978-0-307-95968-3. Archived from the original on 3 December 2023.
- Vowinckel, Annette (2004). Hannah Arendt: zwischen deutscher Philosophie und jüdischer Politik [Hannah Arendt: Between German philosophy and Jewish politics] (in German). Lukas Verlag. ISBN 978-3-936872-36-1. Archived from the original on 3 December 2023. (full text Archived 19 September 2018 at the Wayback Machine)
- Young-Bruehl, Elisabeth (2004) [1982]. Hannah Arendt: For Love of the World (Second ed.). Yale University Press. ISBN 978-0-300-10588-9.

==== Critical works ====
- Aschheim, Steven E., ed. (2001). Hannah Arendt in Jerusalem [Hannah Arendt Beyerushalayim, Hebrew University of Jerusalem 2007 (in Hebrew)]. University of California Press. ISBN 978-0-520-22057-7.
  - Shenhav, Yehouda (3 May 2007). "All Aboard the Arendt Express". Haaretz (Review). Archived from the original on 31 July 2018.
- Berkowitz, Roger; Storey, Ian, eds. (2017). Artifacts of Thinking: Reading Hannah Arendt's Denktagebuch. Oxford University Press. ISBN 978-0-8232-7217-4.
- Bernauer, J.W., ed. (1987). Amor Mundi: Explorations in the Faith and Thought of Hannah Arendt. Springer Science & Business Media. ISBN 978-94-009-3565-5.
  - Bernauer, James W. (1987a). "The Faith of Hannah Arendt: Amor Mundi and its Critique – Assimilation of Religious Experience". pp. 1–28.
- Bernstein, Richard J. (2013). Hannah Arendt and the Jewish Question. Wiley. ISBN 978-0-7456-6570-2.
- Birmingham, Peg (2006). Hannah Arendt and Human Rights: The Predicament of Common Responsibility. Indiana University Press. ISBN 978-0-253-11226-2. Archived from the original on 3 December 2023.
- Bowen-Moore, Patricia (1989). Hannah Arendt's Philosophy of Natality. Palgrave Macmillan UK. ISBN 978-1-349-20125-9. Archived from the original on 3 December 2023.
- Courtine-Denamy, Sylvie (2000) [1997 Editions Albin Michel]. Trois femmes dans de sombres temps [Three Women in Dark Times: Edith Stein, Hannah Arendt, Simone Weil, or Amor fati, amor mundi]. Translated by G.M. Goshgarian. Cornell University Press. ISBN 978-0-8014-8758-3. Archived from the original on 3 December 2023.
- Grunenberg, Antonia [in German] (2018). "Hannah Arendt-Studien / Hannah Arendt Studies" (in English and German). Peter Lang. Archived from the original on 28 August 2018.
- Hayden, Patrick, ed. (2014). Hannah Arendt: Key Concepts. Routledge. ISBN 978-1-317-54588-0. Archived from the original on 3 December 2023.
- Hermsen, Joke J.; Villa, Dana Richard, eds. (1999). The Judge and the Spectator: Hannah Arendt's Political Philosophy. Peeters Publishers. ISBN 978-90-429-0781-2. Archived from the original on 3 December 2023.
- Hinchman, Lewis P.; Hinchman, Sandra, eds. (1994). Hannah Arendt: Critical Essays. SUNY Press. ISBN 978-0-7914-1853-6. Archived from the original on 3 December 2023.
- Jones, Kathleen B. (2013a). Diving for Pearls: A Thinking Journey with Hannah Arendt. Thinking Women Books. ISBN 978-0-9860586-0-8. Archived from the original on 3 December 2023. excerpt Archived 6 October 2018 at the Wayback Machine, see also Jones (2013)
- Kiess, John (2016). Hannah Arendt and Theology. Bloomsbury Publishing. ISBN 978-0-567-62851-0. Archived from the original on 3 December 2023.
- Kristeva, Julia (2001b). Hannah Arendt: Life is a Narrative. Translated by Frank Collins. University of Toronto Press. ISBN 978-0-8020-3521-9. Archived from the original on 3 December 2023.
- Luban, David. Arendt After Jerusalem: The Moral and Legal Philosophy (PDF). To be published. Archived (PDF) from the original on 21 September 2018.
- May, Larry; Kohn, Jerome, eds. (1997). Hannah Arendt: Twenty Years Later. MIT Press. ISBN 978-0-262-63182-2. Archived from the original on 3 December 2023.
- McGowan, John (1998). Hannah Arendt: An Introduction. University of Minnesota Press. ISBN 978-1-4529-0338-5. Archived from the original on 3 December 2023.
- Ring, Jennifer (1998). The Political Consequences of Thinking: Gender and Judaism in the Work of Hannah Arendt. SUNY Press. ISBN 978-1-4384-1739-4. Archived from the original on 3 December 2023.
- Swift, Simon (2008). Hannah Arendt. Routledge. ISBN 978-1-134-09355-7. Archived from the original on 3 December 2023.
- Villa, Dana, ed. (2000). The Cambridge Companion to Hannah Arendt. Cambridge University Press. ISBN 978-0-521-64571-3. text at Pensar el Espacio Público Archived 13 January 2021 at the Wayback Machine

==== Historical ====
- Augustine, Saint (1995). In Joannis evangelium tractatus [Tractates on the Gospel of John, 111-24]. Translated by John W. Rettig. CUA Press. ISBN 978-0-8132-0092-7. Archived from the original on 3 December 2023.
- — (2008). Tractatus in epistolam Joannis ad Parthos [Homilies on the First Epistle of John]. Translated by Boniface Ramsay. New City Press. ISBN 978-1-56548-289-0. Archived from the original on 3 December 2023., available in Latin as
- Kant, Immanuel (2006) [1798]. Anthropologie in pragmatischer Hinsicht [Anthropology from a Pragmatic Point of View]. Translated by Robert Louden. Cambridge University Press. ISBN 978-0-521-67165-1. Archived from the original on 3 December 2023.
- — (1793). Die Religion innerhalb der Grenzen der bloßen Vernunft. Königsberg: Friedrich Nicolovius. p. 99. Archived from the original on 8 September 2020.
- — (1838). Religion Within the Boundary of Pure Reason. Translated by J. W. Semple. Edinburgh: Thomas Clark. p. 125.
- Lazare, Bernard (2016) [1898 Kadimah, Paris]. Le Nationalisme Juif. Hachette Livre. ISBN 978-2-01-359879-8. Archived from the original on 3 December 2023. facsimile text Archived 15 February 2020 at the Wayback Machine at Gallica, and reproduced on Wikisource
- Rühle-Gerstel, Alice (1932). Das Frauenproblem der Gegenwart: eine psychologische Bilanz [Contemporary Women's Issues: A psychological balance sheet] (in German). S. Hirzel. Archived from the original on 3 December 2023.
- Weber, Max (1978) [1922]. Roth, Guenther; Wittich, Claus (eds.). Wirtschaft und Gesellschaft: Grundriss der verstehenden Soziologie [Economy and Society: An Outline of Interpretive Sociology]. University of California Press. ISBN 978-0-520-03500-3. Archived from the original on 3 December 2023. full text available on Internet Archive
- Weil, Hans [in German] (1967) [1930]. Die Entstehung des deutschen Bildungsprinzips [The Origin of the German Educational Principle]. H. Bouvier. Archived from the original on 3 December 2023.

=== Chapters and contributions ===
- Arendt, Hannah (1993a) [1953]. "Ideology and Terror" (PDF). pp. 338–348. Archived (PDF) from the original on 9 August 2020.
- Baier, Annette C (1997). Ethics in many different voices. pp. 325–346., in May & Kohn (1997)
- — (1998). Ethics in many different voices. pp. 247–268., in Adamson, Freadman & Parker (1998)
- Beiner, Ronald (1997). Love and worldliness: Hannah Arendt's reading of Saint Augustine. pp. 269–284., in May & Kohn (1997)
- Brocke, Edna [in German] (2009a). Afterword. 'Big Hannah' – My Aunt. pp. 512–522., in Arendt (2009a)
- Canovan, Margaret (2013). Introduction. University of Chicago Press. pp. vii–xx. ISBN 978-0-226-92457-1. Archived from the original on 3 December 2023., in Arendt (2013)
- Dries, Christian (2011). Günther Anders und Hannah Arendt - eine Beziehungsskizze (in German). pp. 71–140., in Anders (2011)
- Elon, Amos (2006a). Introduction. Penguin. p. xxi. ISBN 978-1-101-00716-7. Archived from the original on 3 December 2023., in Arendt (2006a)
- Fry, Karin (2014). Natality (PDF). pp. 23–35. Archived (PDF) from the original on 11 September 2018., in Hayden (2014)
- Guilherme, Alexandre and Morgan, W. John, 'Hannah Arendt (1906–1975)-dialogue as a public space'. Chapter 4 in Philosophy, Dialogue, and Education: Nine modern European philosophers, Routledge, London and New York, pp. 55–71, ISBN 978-1-138-83149-0.
- Gould, Carol (2009). Hannah Arendt and Remembrance. Rowman & Littlefield Publishers. pp. 65–72. ISBN 978-1-4616-3656-4. Archived from the original on 3 December 2023., in Richter (2009)
- Kippenberger, Hans (8 February 1936). 376a. Vertraulicher Bericht Kippenbergers uber den Parteiselbstschutz (PSS) der KPD [Confidential report by Kippenberger on the party self-protection of the KPD]. Moscow: De Gruyter. pp. 1182–1185., in Weber et al (2014)
- Luban, David (1994). Explaining Dark Times: Hannah Arendt's Theory of Theory. pp. 79–110., in Hinchman & Hinchman (1994)
- Scott, Joanna Vecchiarelli; Stark, Judith Chelius (1996). Preface: Rediscovering Love and Saint Augustine. University of Chicago Press. pp. vii–xviii. ISBN 978-0-226-02596-4. Archived from the original on 3 December 2023., in Arendt (1996)
- Vollrath, Ernst (1997). Hannah Arendt: A German-American Jewess views the United States - and looks back to Germany. pp. 45–58., in Kielmansegg et al (1997)
- Weyembergh, Maurice (1999). Remembrance and Oblivion. Peeters Publishers. pp. 79–96. ISBN 978-90-429-0781-2. Archived from the original on 3 December 2023., in Hermsen & Villa (1999)

=== Dictionaries and encyclopedias ===
- Das Aussprachewörterbuch (in German) (7th ed.). Duden. 2015.
- Baron, Salo (2007). "Conference on Jewish Social Studies". Encyclopaedia Judaica. Thomson Gale. Archived from the original on 6 January 2019.
- d'Entreves, Maurizio Passerin (2014). "Hannah Arendt". Stanford Encyclopedia of Philosophy Archive. Stanford University. Archived from the original on 30 January 2019. (Version: January 2019 Archived 30 January 2019 at the Wayback Machine)
- Hyman, Paula; Moore, Deborah Dash, eds. (1998). Jewish Women in America: An Historical Encyclopedia. 2 vols. I: A-L. Routledge. ISBN 978-0-415-91934-0. Archived from the original on 3 December 2023.
  - Whitfield, Stephen J. (1998). Hannah Arendt (1906 - 1975). pp. 61–64. Archived from the original on 19 July 2018., in Hyman & Moore (1998)
- Lovett, Frank (4 June 2018). "Republicanism". Stanford Encyclopedia of Philosophy Archive. Stanford University. Archived from the original on 25 October 2018.
- Wood, Kelsey (7 January 2004). "Hannah Arendt". The Literary Encyclopedia. The Literary Dictionary Company Limited. Archived from the original on 24 July 2018.
- Yar, Majid. "Hannah Arendt (1906—1975)". Internet Encyclopedia of Philosophy. Archived from the original on 19 July 2018.
- "Hannah Arendt". Encyclopedia of World Biography. The Gale Group. 2010. Archived from the original on 22 April 2017.
- Cullen-DuPont, Kathryn (2014) [1996]. Encyclopedia of Women's History in America (2nd ed.). Infobase Publishing. ISBN 978-1-4381-1033-2. Archived from the original on 3 December 2023.

=== Magazines ===
- Adelman, Jeremy (Spring 2016). "Pariah: Can Hannah Arendt Help Us Rethink Our Global Refugee Crisis?". Wilson Quarterly. Archived from the original on 6 October 2018.
- Bernstein, Richard (19 August 2018a). "The Urgent Relevance of Hannah Arendt". The Philosophers' Magazine. No. 82. pp. 24–31. Archived from the original on 15 February 2020.
- Gellhorn, Martha (February 1962). "Eichmann and the Private Conscience". Atlantic Monthly., reprinted in Gellhorn (1988, pp. 217–233)
- Heinrich, Kaspar (19 November 2013). "Fotografien von Fred Stein: Der Poet mit der Kleinbildkamera". Der Spiegel (in German). Archived from the original on 20 October 2017.
- Held, Virginia; Kazin, Alfred (21 October 1982). "Feminism & Hannah Arendt". The New York Review of Books. Archived from the original on 15 February 2020.
- Howe, Irving (5 June 2013). "Banality and Brilliance". Dissent. Archived from the original on 7 September 2018., reprinted from Howe (1984, pp. 269ff)
- Jones, Kathleen B. (12 November 2013). "Hannah Arendt's Female Friends". Los Angeles Review of Books. Archived from the original on 19 August 2018., reprinted in Jones (2013a)
- Kirsch, Adam (12 January 2009). "Beware of Pity: Hannah Arendt and the power of the impersonal". The New Yorker. Archived from the original on 18 July 2018.
- Kohler, Lotte (21 March 1996). "The Arendt/Heidegger Affair". The New York Review of Books. Archived from the original on 15 February 2020.
- Maier-Katkin, Daniel (2010). "How Hannah Arendt Was Labeled an 'Enemy of Israel'". Tikkun. Vol. 25, no. 6. pp. 11–14. ISSN 2164-0041. Archived from the original on 9 March 2021.
- Obermair, Hannes (April 2018). "Da Hans a Hannah—il 'duce' di Bolzano e la sfida di Arendt" [From Hans to Hannah—Mussolini in Bolzano and Arendt's Challenge]. Il Cristallo. Rassegna di Varia Umanità (in Italian). Vol. 60, no. 1. pp. 27–32. ISSN 0011-1449. Archived from the original on 16 October 2021.
- Seliger, Ralph (15 April 2011). "Hannah Arendt: From Iconoclast to Icon". Tikkun. Archived from the original on 30 March 2016.

=== Newspapers ===
- Berkowitz, Roger (7 July 2013a). "Misreading 'Eichmann in Jerusalem'". The New York Times (Opinionator: The Stone). Archived from the original on 19 September 2018.
- Bernstein, Richard J. (20 June 2018b). "The Illuminations of Hannah Arendt". The New York Times. Archived from the original on 15 February 2020.
- Bird, David (4 December 1975a). "Hannah Arendt, Political Scientist Dead". The New York Times (Obituary). Archived from the original on 3 May 2021.
- Bird, David (5 December 1975b). "Hannah Arendt, Political Scientist Dead". The New York Times. Archived from the original on 8 March 2021.
- Butler, Judith (29 August 2011). "Hannah Arendt's challenge to Adolf Eichmann". The Guardian. Archived from the original on 16 December 2018.
- Grenier, Elizabeth (2 February 2017). "Why the world is turning to Hannah Arendt to explain Trump". DW. Archived from the original on 15 February 2020.
- Hanlon, Aaron (31 August 2018). "Postmodernism didn't cause Trump. It explains him". Washington Post. Archived from the original on 12 September 2018.
- Invernizzi-Accetti, Carlo (6 December 2017). "A small Italian town can teach the world how to defuse controversial monuments". The Guardian. Archived from the original on 5 September 2018.
- Kakutani, Michiko (14 July 2018a). "The death of truth: how we gave up on facts and ended up with Trump". The Guardian. Archived from the original on 3 September 2018.
- Kramer, Henri (1 March 2017). "Gedenktafel für Hannah Arendt in Babelsberg". Potsdamer Neueste Nachrichten (in German). Archived from the original on 16 September 2018.
- Moreira, Cristiana Faria (23 December 2017). "Hannah Arendt. A passagem por Lisboa a caminho da liberdade". Publico (in Portuguese). Archived from the original on 22 October 2020.
- Pfeffer, Anshel (9 May 2008). "Dear Hannah". Haaretz. Archived from the original on 8 January 2018.
- Sznaider, Natan (20 October 2006). "Human, citizen, Jew". Haaretz. Archived from the original on 20 October 2017.
- Tavares, Rui (10 December 2018). "Hannah Arendt em Lisboa". Publico (in Portuguese). Archived from the original on 6 October 2019.
- Williams, Zoe (1 February 2017). "Totalitarianism in the age of Trump: lessons from Hannah Arendt". The Guardian. Archived from the original on 28 June 2020.
- "Killer of 6,000,000; Adolf Eichmann". The New York Times. 26 May 1960. p. 18. Archived from the original on 15 February 2020.
- "'Show' Trial Promised". The New York Times. 28 May 1960. p. 9. Archived from the original on 15 February 2020.

=== Theses ===
- Herman, Dana (2008). Hashavat Avedah: a history of Jewish Cultural Reconstruction, Inc (PhD thesis). Montreal: Department of History, McGill University. Archived from the original on 3 December 2023.

=== Websites ===
- Fry, Karin (2009). "Hannah Arendt 1906–1975: Philosophy of Mind, Social & Political Philosophy". Women Philosophers. Society for the Study of Women Philosophers. Archived from the original on 24 July 2018.
- "Fred Stein: Hannah Arendt, photograph (1944): Philosopher in a contemplative pose". Arts in Exile (Virtual exhibition). Archived from the original on 2 August 2018.
- Barry, James, ed. (2017). "Arendt Studies" (journal). Archived from the original on 15 August 2018.
- Addison, Sam (1972–1974). "Hannah Arendt: The Life of the Mind". Gifford Lectures. University of Aberdeen. Archived from the original on 15 February 2020.
- "Hannah Arendt & the University of Heidelberg". Between Truth and Hope. 30 October 2016. Archived from the original on 29 August 2018.
- "Pensar el Espacio Público ~ Seminario de Filosofía Política" (in Spanish). 2014–2015. Archived from the original on 31 August 2018.
- "Hannah Arendt. Vertrauen in das Menschliche" (PDF) (Exhibition brochure) (in German). Goethe Institut. 2011. Archived (PDF) from the original on 1 September 2018.
- Krieghofer, Gerald (1 July 2017). "'Niemand hat das Recht zu gehorchen.' Hannah Arendt (angeblich)". Zitaträtsel. Archived from the original on 5 September 2018.
- Miller, Joshua A. (25 September 2017). "How the Schocken Books collections changed Arendt scholarship". Anotherpanacea. Archived from the original on 5 September 2018.
- "Obedience and Dictatorship". Desperado Philosophy. 22 December 2017. Archived from the original on 7 September 2018.
- Wolters, Eugene (16 July 2013). "Everyone is Wrong About Hannah Arendt". Critical-Theory. Archived from the original on 6 September 2018.
- Hill, Samantha Rose (26 March 2017). "What does it mean to love the world? Hannah Arendt and Amor Mundi". openDemocracy. Archived from the original on 8 September 2018.
- "Ten things Hannah Arendt said that are eerily relevant in today's political times". Scroll.in. 4 December 2017. Archived from the original on 1 October 2019.
- Brecht, Bertolt. "An die Nachgeborenen". Lyrik-line: Listen to the poet (in German). Haus für Poesie. Archived from the original on 15 September 2018. – includes Brecht reading (english Archived 15 February 2020 at the Wayback Machine)
- Coombes, Thomas (12 February 2017). "Why we all need to read 'The Origins of Totalitarianism'". Medium. Archived from the original on 20 September 2018.
- Gold, Hannah (29 January 2017). "Amazon Needs to Restock Hannah Arendt's The Origins of Totalitarianism". Jezebel. Archived from the original on 30 August 2018.
- "Hannah Arendt". kulturreise-ideen (in German). Archived from the original on 3 December 2023.
- Hill, Samantha (6 December 2015). "A Meditation on Arendt, Rilke, & Guns". Amor Mundi. Hannah Arendt Center for Politics and Humanities; Bard College. Archived from the original on 14 April 2021.
- Rilke, Rainer Maria (1912–1922). "Duineser Elegien" (in German). Zeno. Archived from the original on 18 October 2018. (English translation by A. S. Kline 2004)
- Paula, Luisa (28 December 2018). "Hannah Arendt em Lisboa". Espaço Crítico (in Portuguese). Archived from the original on 21 February 2019.

==== Biographies and timelines ====
- AAAL. "Academy Members: Deceased". Members. American Academy of Arts and Letters. Archived from the original on 8 October 2020.
- Heller, Anne C (6 July 2015a). "Hannah Arendt: A Brief Chronology". Anne C. Heller. Archived from the original on 17 August 2018.
- "Hannah Arendt". Monoskop. 24 July 2018. Archived from the original on 27 July 2018.
- "Hannah Arendt". Contemporary Thinkers. The Foundation for Constitutional Government. 2018. Archived from the original on 15 March 2016.

==== Institutions, locations and organizations ====
- Bernstein, Richard J. (2017). "Hannah Arendt Center". New York: The New School for Social Research. Archived from the original on 15 August 2018.
- Bhabha, Homi K.; Weigel, Sigrid (March 2018). "We Refugees« – 75 Years Later. Hannah Arendt's Reflections on Human Rights and the Human Condition". Berlin: Zentrum für Literatur- und Kulturforschung. Archived from the original on 26 November 2018.
- "Hannah Arendt Centre". Institut für Philosophie: Carl von Ossietzky Universität Oldenburg. Archived from the original on 3 December 2023.
- "Hannah Arendt Center for Political Studies". Department of Human Sciences, University of Verona. 2018. Archived from the original on 11 September 2018.
- "Hannah Arendt Gymnasium, Haßloch" (in German). Archived from the original on 31 July 2018.
- "Hannah Arendt Gymnasium, Berlin" (in German). 2018. Archived from the original on 14 August 2018.
- Dries, Christian (July 2018). "Vita Günther Anders (1902–1992)". Internationale Günther Anders Gesellschaft. Translated by Christopher John Müller. Archived from the original on 14 October 2017.
- Kirscher, Gilbert (27 March 2003). "Éric Weil: A Biography". Institut Eric Weil-Université de Lille. Archived from the original on 28 August 2018.
- GDW (2016). "Hannah Arendt". Exile and Resistance. German Resistance Memorial Center. Archived from the original on 20 September 2018.
- "Hannah Arendt Tage". Das offizielle Portal der Region und der Landeshauptstadt Hannover. City of Hanover. Archived from the original on 28 July 2018.
  - "Hannah Arendt in Hannover". Das offizielle Portal der Region und der Landeshauptstadt Hannover. City of Hanover. 22 August 2017. Archived from the original on 15 February 2020.
- CAS (2011). "Guide to the Center for Advanced Studies Records, 1958 – 1969". Wesleyan University Library. Archived from the original on 24 June 2018.
- UNHCR (2 August 2017). "Arendt, Hannah". UNHCR Central Europe. Archived from the original on 2 August 2018.
- "Orte des Erinnerns – Denkmal im Bayerischen Viertel, 1993 (Berlin-Schöneberg)" (in German). Kunstgeschichtliche Gesellschaft zu Berlin. 2018. Archived from the original on 20 September 2018.

===== Hannah Arendt Center, Bard College =====
- "The Hannah Arendt Center for Politics and Humanities". Bard College. n.d. Archived from the original on 14 August 2018.
  - "About Us". Hannah Arendt Center for Politics and Humanities; Bard College. n.d. Archived from the original on 19 September 2018.
  - "The Hannah Arendt Collection". Hannah Arendt Center, Stevenson Library, Bard College. Archived from the original on 27 July 2018 – via WordPress.
    - Kettler, David (2009). "Hannah Arendt Collection: Arendt on Mannheim". Archived from the original on 21 September 2018.
  - "The Hannah Arendt Center". Medium. Archived from the original on 20 September 2018.
  - "Amor Mundi". Medium. Archived from the original on 27 October 2018.
  - "Film Screening: In Search of The Last Agora". Bard College. 15 November 2018. Archived from the original on 28 September 2020.

==== Maps ====
- "Rue Hannah Arendt". Google Maps. Archived from the original on 8 October 2018.

=== External images ===
- "Hannah Arendt (1906—1975)". Internet Encyclopedia of Philosophy (Photograph of commemorative stamp). 1988. Archived from the original on 8 August 2018.
- "Hannah Arendt, stamp, Germany 2006" (Photograph of commemorative stamp). UNHCR. 2006. Archived from the original on 12 January 2018.
- "Hannah Arendts Erkennungskarte der Universität Heidelberg 1928". Bild des Monats (Student identity card). University of Heidelberg. November 2015. Archived from the original on 29 August 2018.
- "Cover". Saturday Review of Literature (Cover image). 24 March 1951. Archived from the original on 26 September 2018.
- "Plaque". Lisbon City Council. 10 December 2018. Archived from the original on 24 February 2021.
