= Bibliography of Hannah Arendt =

This is a bibliography of works about the philosopher Hannah Arendt.

== Articles (journals and proceedings) ==
- Allen, Wayne F. (1 July 1982). "Hannah Arendt: existential phenomenology and political freedom". Philosophy & Social Criticism. 9 (2): 170–190. doi:10.1177/019145378200900203. Archived from the original on 15 October 2021.
- Arendt, Hannah (15 September 2006s). "Nationalstaat und Demokratie (1963)" [Nation-state and democracy (1963)]. Zeitschrift für politisches Denken (in German). 2 (1). Archived from the original on 1 December 2018.
- Bagchi, Barnita (January 2007). "Hannah Arendt, Education, and Liberation: A Comparative South Asian Feminist Perspective". Heidelberg Papers in South Asian and Comparative Politics (35).
- Balber, Samantha (2017). "Hannah Arendt: A Conscious Pariah and Her People". Footnotes. 1: 165–183. Archived from the original on 15 February 2020.
- Beiner, Ronald (Spring 1980). "Judging in a world of appearances: A Commentary on Hannah Arendt's Unwritten Finale". History of Political Thought. 1 (1): 117–135. JSTOR 26211840.
- Betz, Joseph (1992). "An Introduction to the Thought of Hannah Arendt". Transactions of the Charles S. Peirce Society. 28 (3): 379–422. JSTOR 40320369.
- Brandes, Daniel (2010). "Nietzsche, Arendt, and the Promise of the Future" (PDF). Animus. 14. ISSN 1209-0689. Archived (PDF) from the original on 2011-08-13.
- Burroughs, Michael D (2015). "Hannah Arendt, 'Reflections on Little Rock,' and White Ignorance". Critical Philosophy of Race. 3 (1): 52–78. doi:10.5325/critphilrace.3.1.0052.
- Calcagno, Antonio (January 2013). "The Desire For And Pleasure Of Evil: The Augustinian Limitations Of Arendtian Mind". The Heythrop Journal. 54 (1): 89–100. doi:10.1111/j.1468-2265.2009.00513.x.
- Cook, Joseph J. ""Ich Bin Adolf Eichmann" Recalling the Banality of Evil" (PDF). Saber and Scroll. 5 (1): 81–93. Archived (PDF) from the original on 2018-08-22.
- Elon, Amos (2006). "The Excommunication of Hannah Arendt". World Policy Journal. 23 (4): 93–102. doi:10.1162/wopj.2007.23.4.93. JSTOR 40210059.
- Epstein, Alek D. (30 September 2014). "Judging the Trial: Hannah Arendt as a Moral Philosopher of Nation-State Building". The European Legacy. 19 (7): 901–905. doi:10.1080/10848770.2014.965516.
- Honig, B. (March 1991). "Declarations of Independence: Arendt and Derrida on the Problem of Founding a Republic". The American Political Science Review. 85 (1): 97–113. doi:10.2307/1962880. JSTOR 1962880.
- Horst, Gerfried (2015). "Ханна Арендт и Кёнигсберг" [Hannah Arendt and Königsberg]. Voprosy Filosofii (in Russian) (8): 184–190. Archived from the original on 28 July 2018. (French translation)
- Jakopovich, Dan (Fall 2009). "Hannah Arendt and Nonviolence" (PDF). Peace Studies Journal. 2 (1): 1 14. Archived (PDF) from the original on 2018-08-13.
- Jonas, Hans (2006) [2003]. "Hannah Arendt: An Intimate Portrait". New England Review. 27 (2). Translated by Brian Fox and Richard Wolin: 133–142. JSTOR 40244828.
- Kohn, Jerome (2017). "Introduction to Hannah Arendt's "Nation-State and Democracy"". Arendt Studies. 1: 5. doi:10.5840/arendtstudies201712.
- Laqueur, Walter (1998). "The Arendt Cult: Hannah Arendt as Political Commentator". Journal of Contemporary History. 33 (4): 483–496. doi:10.1177/002200949803300401. JSTOR 260982., reprinted in Aschheim (2001, pp. 47–64)
- Lebeau, Vicky (29 June 2016). "The Unwelcome Child: Elizabeth Eckford and Hannah Arendt". Journal of Visual Culture. 3 (1): 51–62. doi:10.1177/1470412904043598. Archived from the original on 16 October 2021.
- Lefort, Claude (2002). "Thinking with and against Hannah Arendt". Social Research: An International Quarterly. 69 (2): 447–459. ISSN 1944-768X.
- Maier-Katkin, Daniel (November 2011). "The Reception of Hannah Arendt's Eichmann in Jerusalem in the United States 1963–2011". HannahArendt.net. 6 (1). doi:10.57773/hanet.v6i1/2.64. Archived from the original on 20 October 2017.
- Markus, Maria (1987). "The 'Anti-Feminism' of Hannah Arendt". Thesis Eleven. 17 (1): 76–87. doi:10.1177/072551368701700106.
- Momigliano, Arnaldo (1980). "A Note on Max Weber's Definition of Judaism as a Pariah-Religion". History and Theory. 19 (3): 313–318. doi:10.2307/2504547. JSTOR 2504547.
- Morey, Maribel (20 December 2011). "Reassessing Hannah Arendt's "Reflections on Little Rock" (1959)". Law, Culture and the Humanities. 10 (1): 88–110. doi:10.1177/1743872111423795. SSRN 966657.
- Pickett, Adrienne (2009). "Images, Dialogue, and Aesthetic Education: Arendt's response to the Little Rock Crisis" (PDF). Philosophical Studies in Education. 40: 188–199. Archived (PDF) from the original on 2016-05-15.
- Ray, Larry; Diemling, Maria (24 July 2016). "Arendt's 'conscious pariah' and the ambiguous figure of the subaltern" (PDF). European Journal of Social Theory. 19 (4): 503–520. doi:10.1177/1368431016628261. Archived (PDF) from the original on 20 July 2018.
- Riepl-Schmidt, Mascha (15 February 2005). "Henriette Arendt". HannahArendt.net (in German). 1 (1). doi:10.57773/hanet.v1i1.87. ISSN 1869-5787. Archived from the original on 19 July 2020.
- Rösch, Felix (20 September 2013). "Realism as social criticism: The thinking partnership of Hannah Arendt and Hans Morgenthau" (PDF). International Politics. 50 (6): 815–829. doi:10.1057/ip.2013.32. Archived (PDF) from the original on 2022-04-21.
- Rosenberg, Elissa (February 2012). "Walking in the city: memory and place". The Journal of Architecture. 17 (1): 131–149. doi:10.1080/13602365.2012.659914.
- Saussy, Haun (2013). "The Refugee Speaks of Parvenus and Their Beautiful Illusions: A Rediscovered 1934 Text by Hannah Arendt". Critical Inquiry. 40 (1): 1–14. doi:10.1086/673223.
- Schuler-Springorum, Stefanie (1 June 1999). "Assimilation and Community Reconsidered: The Jewish Community in Konigsberg, 1871-1914". Jewish Social Studies. 5 (3): 104–131. doi:10.1353/jss.1999.0008. ISSN 1527-2028.
- Shmueli, Efraim (1968). "The "Pariah-People" and Its "Charismatic Leadership": A Revaluation of Max Weber's "Ancient Judaism"". Proceedings of the American Academy for Jewish Research. 36: 167–247. doi:10.2307/3622338. JSTOR 3622338.
- Shenhav, Yehouda (December 2013). "Beyond 'instrumental rationality': Lord Cromer and the imperial roots of Eichmann's bureaucracy" (PDF). Journal of Genocide Research. 15 (4): 379–399. doi:10.1080/14623528.2013.856083. Archived (PDF) from the original on 2014-09-08.
- Szécsényi, Endre (30 March 2005). The Hungarian Revolution in the "Reflections" by Hannah Arendt. Europe or the Globe? Eastern European Trajectories in Times of Integration and Globalization. IWM. Archived from the original on 8 April 2022.
- Sznaider, Natan (25 April 2015). "Hannah Arendt: Jew and Cosmopolitan". Socio (4): 197–221. doi:10.4000/socio.1359. Archived from the original on 20 September 2018.
- Teixeira, Christina Heine (September 2006). "Wartesaal Lissabon 1941: Hannah Arendt und Heinrich Blücher". HannahArendt.net. 1 (2). doi:10.57773/hanet.v2i1.99. Archived from the original on 13 July 2020.
- Villa, Dana (2008). "Political violence and terror: Arendtian reflections". Ethics & Global Politics. 1 (3): 97–113. doi:10.3402/egp.v1i3.1861.
- — (2009). "Hannah Arendt, 1906-1975". The Review of Politics. 71 (1): 20–36. doi:10.1017/S0034670509000035. JSTOR 25655783.
- Visvanathan, Susan (April 2001). "Hannah Arendt and the Problem of Our Age". Economic and Political Weekly. 36 (16): 1307–1309. JSTOR 4410510.
- Vogel, Lawrence A. (Spring 2008). "The Responsibility of Thinking in Dark Times: Hannah Arendt versus Hans Jonas". Graduate Faculty Philosophy Journal. 29 (1): 253–293. doi:10.5840/gfpj20082919. Archived from the original on 17 December 2013.
- Waite, Robert G. (2002). "Returning Jewish Cultural Property: The Handling of Books Looted by the Nazis in the American Zone of Occupation, 1945 to 1952". Libraries & the Cultural Record. 37 (3): 213–228. doi:10.1353/lac.2002.0062. ISSN 1932-9555. JSTOR 2262716.
- Wellmer, Albrecht (1999). "Hannah Arendt On Revolution". Revue Internationale de Philosophie. 53 (208 (2)): 207–222. JSTOR 23955552.
- Young-Bruehl, Elizabeth (May 1982). "Reflections on Hannah Arendt's the Life of the Mind". Political Theory. 10 (2): 277–305. doi:10.1177/0090591782010002008.

=== Rahel Varnhagen ===
- Benhabib, Seyla (1995). "The Pariah and Her Shadow: Hannah Arendt's Biography of Rahel Varnhagen". Political Theory. 23 (1): 5–24. doi:10.1177/0090591795023001002. JSTOR 192171.
- Cutting-Gray, Joanne (1991). "Hannah Arendt's Rahel Varnhagen". Philosophy and Literature. 15 (2): 229–245. doi:10.1353/phl.1991.0023.
- Goldstein, Donald J. (Spring 2009). "Hannah Arendt's Shared Destiny with Rahel Varnhagen". Women in Judaism. 6 (1): 18. Archived from the original on 15 February 2020.
- Zebadúa Yáñez, Verónica (2018). "Reading the Lives of Others: Biography as Political Thought in Hannah Arendt and Simone de Beauvoir". Hypatia. 33 (1): 94–110. doi:10.1111/hypa.12383. ISSN 0887-5367.

=== Special issues and proceedings ===
- Ojakangas, Mika, ed. (2010). Hannah Arendt: Practice, Thought and Judgement (Special issue). Vol. 8. Helsinki: Helsinki Collegium for Advanced Studies. Archived from the original on 16 February 2020.
  - Scott, Joanna Vecchiarelli (2010). "What St. Augustine Taught Hannah Arendt about "how to live in the world": Caritas, Natality and the Banality of Evil". Studies across Disciplines in the Humanities and Social Sciences. Vol. 8. pp. 8–27. Archived from the original on 2020-02-15.
  - Ojakangas, Mika (2010a). "Arendt, Socrates, and the Ethics of Conscience" (PDF). Studies across Disciplines in the Humanities and Social Sciences. Vol. 8. pp. 67–85. Archived (PDF) from the original on 26 September 2020.
- Tymieniecka, Anna-Teresa, ed. (2004). Does the World Exist?: Plurisignificant Ciphering of Reality (Proceedings of the 51st International Congress of Phenomenology, Rome 2001. Analecta Husserliana. Vol. 79. Springer Science & Business Media. ISBN 978-94-010-0047-5.
  - Durst, Margarete (2004). Birth and Natality in Hannah Arendt. Springer. pp. 777–797. ISBN 978-94-010-0047-5.
- Zamora, José Antonio; Arribas, Sonia, eds. (2010). "Hannah Arendt. Pensar en tiempos sombríos". Arbor (Special issue) (in Spanish). 186 (742). doi:10.3989/arbor.2010.i742. hdl:10651/7563.
- "Hannah Arendt". Social Research (Special issue). 44 (1). Spring 1977. JSTOR i40043622.
  - Jonas, Hans (1977). "Acting, Knowing, Thinking: Gleanings from Hannah Arendt's Philosophical Work". Social Research. 44 (1): 25–43. JSTOR 40970269.

== Audiovisual ==
- Berkowitz, Roger (2013). Hannah Arendt: A brief biography (DVD liner notes to Hannah Arendt). Zeitgeist Films.
- BBFC (2013). Hannah Arendt. Releases (Film) (in German, English, and Hebrew). British Board of Film Classification. Archived from the original on 15 February 2020.
  - IMDb (2012). Hannah Arendt (Film) (in German, English, and Hebrew). Archived from the original on 15 February 2020. (see also Hannah Arendt)
  - Page, Christopher (18 September 2013). "Hannah Arendt: The Responsibility of Conscience". Times Colonist (Review). Archived from the original on 16 August 2018.
  - Weigel, Moira (16 July 2013). "Heritage Girl Crush: On "Hannah Arendt"". Los Angeles Review of Books (Review). Archived from the original on 19 August 2018.
- Bragg, Melvyn; Stonebridge, Lyndsey; Sheffield, Frisbee; Eaglestone, Robert (2 February 2017). Hannah Arendt (Radio panel discussion). In Our Time. Radio 4. Archived from the original on 16 October 2018.
- Hannah Arendt Center for Political Studies (2018). Video and Audio recordings (in German, English, and French). University of Verona. Archived from the original on 14 September 2018.
- Lozowick, Yaacov (5 Apr 2011). Hannah Arendt, Adolf Eichmann, and how Evil Isn't Banal. The Holocaust Resource Center (video). Yad Vashem. The World Holocaust Remembrance Center. Archived from the original on 2021-11-15.
- Zeitgeist (2015). Vita Activa – The Spirit of Hannah Arendt (Documentary) (Film) (in German, English, and Hebrew). Zeitgeist Films. Archived from the original on 16 March 2020.
  - Scott, A. O. (5 April 2016). "Review: In 'Vita Activa: The Spirit of Hannah Arendt,' a Thinker More Relevant Than Ever". The New York Times (Review). Archived from the original on 23 May 2020.
- Günter, Gaus [in German]; Arendt, Hannah (1964). Hannah Arendt—A New Look at a Discerning Political Analyst of Her Own Time (Television interview (English subtitles)) (in German). Jewish Museum Berlin. Archived from the original on 10 December 2018.
- Bernstein, Richard (2019): Podcast conversation: "Hannah Arendt is Alarmingly Relevant"

== Books and monographs ==
- Adamson, Jane; Freadman, Richard; Parker, David, eds. (1998). Renegotiating Ethics in Literature, Philosophy, and Theory. Cambridge University Press. ISBN 978-0-521-62938-6.
- Baier, Annette (1995). Moral Prejudices: Essays on Ethics. Harvard University Press. ISBN 978-0-674-58716-8.
  - "Ethics in many different voices" pp. 247–268, see also revised versions as Baier (1998, pp. 247–268) and Baier (1997, pp. 325–346)
- Bernstein, Richard J. (2018). Why Read Hannah Arendt Now?. Wiley. ISBN 978-1-5095-2863-9.
- Cesarani, David (2007). Becoming Eichmann: Rethinking the Life, Crimes, and Trial of a ""Desk Murderer"". Da Capo Press. ISBN 978-0-306-81539-3.
- Clément, Catherine (2001) [1999 Calmann-Lévy]. Martin et Hannah [Martin and Hannah: A Novel]. Translated by Julia Shirek Smith. Prometheus Books. ISBN 978-1-57392-906-6.
  - Schroeder, Steven (2002). "Review of "Martin and Hannah: A Novel"". Essays in Philosophy (Review). 3 (1). ISSN 1526-0569. Archived from the original on 15 February 2020.
- Copjec, Joan, ed. (1996). Radical Evil. Verso. ISBN 978-1-85984-911-8.
- Gellhorn, Martha (1988). The View from the Ground. Atlantic Monthly Press. ISBN 978-0-8021-9117-5.
- Hattem, Cornelis Van; Hattem, Kees van (2005). Superfluous people: a reflection on Hannah Arendt and evil. University Press of America. ISBN 978-0-7618-3304-8.
- Hollinger, David A.; Capper, Charles, eds. (1993). The American Intellectual Tradition: Volume II 1865 to the present (2nd ed.). Oxford University Press. ISBN 978-0-19-507780-3.
  - Arendt, Hannah (1993a) [1953]. "Ideology and Terror" (PDF). pp. 338–348. Archived (PDF) from the original on 2020-08-09.
- Kakutani, Michiko (2018). The Death of Truth: Notes on Falsehood in the Age of Trump. Crown/Archetype. ISBN 978-0-525-57484-2.
  - Hayes, Chris (18 July 2018). "Michiko Kakutani's Book About Our Post-Truth Era". The New York Times (Review). Archived from the original on 4 September 2018.
- Keen, David (2006). Endless war? Hidden functions of the "war on terror". Pluto Press. ISBN 978-0-7453-2417-3.
- Kielmansegg, Peter Graf; Mewes, Horst; Glaser-Schmidt, Elisabeth, eds. (1997). Hannah Arendt and Leo Strauss: German Émigrés and American Political Thought After World War II. Cambridge University Press. ISBN 978-0-521-59936-8. Archived from the original on 3 December 2023.
- King, Richard H. (2018). Arendt and America. University of Chicago Press. ISBN 978-0-226-31152-4.
- Kopić, Mario (2013). Otkucaji drugoga [The Beats of the Other] (in Serbian). Službeni glasnik. ISBN 978-86-519-1721-2.
- Lamey, Andy (2011). Frontier Justice: The Global Refugee Crisis and What To Do About It. Doubleday Canada. ISBN 978-0-307-36792-1.
- Meja, Volker; Stehr, Nico, eds. (2014) [1990]. Knowledge and Politics: The Sociology of Knowledge Dispute. Routledge. ISBN 978-1-317-65163-5. Archived from the original on 3 December 2023.
  - Arendt, Hannah (2014) [1930]. Philosophy and Sociology (PDF). Translated by Clare McMillan and Volker Meja. pp. 196–208. Archived (PDF) from the original on 2018-09-22.
- Mihaely, Zohar (2022). Hannah Arendt and the Crisis of Israeli Democracy. Pickwick Publications. ISBN 978-1-666-79767-1.
- Mihaely, Zohar (2024). Man Confronts Himself Alone. Wipf and Stock Publications, Eugene, Oregon.
- Mihaely, Zohar (2026). The Lost Treasure of Israeli Democracy - The Kibbutz in Arendt's View. Wipf and Stock Publications, Eugene, Oregon.
- Milgram, Stanley (2017) [1974]. Obedience to Authority. HarperCollins. ISBN 978-0-06-280340-5. (see also Obedience to Authority)
- Most, Stephen (2017). Stories Make the World: Reflections on Storytelling and the Art of the Documentary. Berghahn Books.
- Oatley, Keith (2018). Our Minds, Our Selves: A Brief History of Psychology. Princeton University Press. ISBN 978-1-4008-9004-0.
- Richter, William L., ed. (2009). Approaches to Political Thought. Rowman & Littlefield Publishers. ISBN 978-1-4616-3656-4.
- Robinson, Marc, ed. (1996). Altogether Elsewhere: Writers on Exile. Harcourt Brace. ISBN 978-0-15-600389-6.
- Sheldon, Garrett Ward (2003). The History of Political Theory: Ancient Greece to Modern America. Peter Lang Publishing. ISBN 978-0-8204-2300-5.
- Simmons, William Paul (2011). Human Rights Law and the Marginalized Other. Cambridge University Press. ISBN 978-1-139-50326-6.
  - Simmons, William Paul (2011), Arendt, Little Rock, and the Cauterization of the Marginalized Other (PDF) (Essay), archived (PDF) from the original on 2018-08-04
- Swedberg, Richard; Agevall, Ola (2016). The Max Weber Dictionary: Key Words and Central Concepts (2nd ed.). Stanford University Press. ISBN 978-1-5036-0022-5.
- — (2008). Public Freedom. Princeton University Press. ISBN 978-1-4008-3742-7.
- Wasserman, Janek (2014). Black Vienna: The Radical Right in the Red City, 1918–1938. Cornell University Press. ISBN 978-0-8014-5521-6.
- Weber, Hermann; Drabkin, Jakov; Bayerlein, Bernhard H., eds. (2014). Deutschland, Russland, Komintern. II Dokumente (1918–1943): Nach der Archivrevolution: Neuerschlossene Quellen zu der Geschichte der KPD und den deutsch-russischen Beziehungen [Germany, Russia, Comintern. II Documents (1918–1943): After the Archive Revolution: New sources on the history of the KPD and German-Russian relations]. Walter de Gruyter GmbH & Co KG. ISBN 978-3-11-033978-9.
- Young-Bruehl, Elisabeth (1998). Subject to Biography: Psychoanalysis, Feminism, and Writing Women's Lives. Harvard University Press. ISBN 978-0-674-85371-3.

=== Autobiography and biography ===
- AAAS (2018). Book of members, 1780 – present: A (PDF). American Academy of Arts and Sciences. p. 18. Archived (PDF) from the original on 2014-12-17.
- Anders, Günther (2011). Oberschlick, Gerhard (ed.). Die Kirschenschlacht: Dialoge mit Hannah Arendt und ein akademisches Nachwort [The cherry battle: dialogues with Hannah Arendt and an academic epilogue]. C.H.Beck. ISBN 978-3-406-63278-5.
  - Flechard, Jean-Pierre (28 January 2014). "La Bataille de cerises de Günther Anders". Les cahiers psychologie politique 24 (Review) (in French). Archived from the original on 18 September 2018.
  - Berkowitz, Roger (13 February 2012a). "The Cherry Battle". News (Review). Hannah Arendt Center, Bard College. Archived from the original on 14 April 2021.
- Bahr, Raimund (2012). Günther Anders: Leben und Denken im Wort (in German). epubli GmbH. ISBN 978-3-8442-2682-9.
- Berkowitz, Roger (2026). A World We Share: Hannah Arendt and the Power of Friendship in a Broken World. Yale University Press. ISBN 978-0-300-28709-7.
- Ettinger, Elzbieta (1997) [1995]. Hannah Arendt/Martin Heidegger. Yale University Press. ISBN 978-0-300-07254-9.
  - Ryan, Alan (11 January 1996). "Dangerous Liaison". The New York Review of Books (Review). Archived from the original on 15 October 2018.
  - Brent, Frances (30 May 2013). "Arendt's Affair". Tablet (Review). Archived from the original on 10 April 2019.
- Grunenberg, Antonia (2003). Arendt (in German). Herder. ISBN 978-3-451-04954-5. Archived from the original on 3 December 2023.
- — (2017). Hannah Arendt and Martin Heidegger: History of a Love. Indiana University Press. ISBN 978-0-253-02718-4. Archived from the original on 3 December 2023.
- Heller, Anne Conover (2015). Hannah Arendt: A Life in Dark Times. Houghton Mifflin Harcourt. ISBN 978-0-544-45619-8. excerpt
- Hilmes, Oliver (2015). Malevolent Muse: The Life of Alma Mahler. Northeastern University Press. ISBN 978-1-55553-845-3.
- Honig, Bonnie, ed. (2010) [1995]. Feminist Interpretations of Hannah Arendt. Penn State Press. ISBN 978-0-271-04320-3.
- Howe, Irving (1984) [1982]. A Margin of Hope: An Intellectual Autobiography. Harcourt, Brace, Jovanovich. ISBN 978-0-15-657245-3.
- Kristeva, Julia (2001a). Hannah Arendt. Translated by Ross Guberman. Columbia University Press. ISBN 978-0-231-12102-6.
- Maier-Katkin, Daniel (2010a). Stranger from Abroad: Hannah Arendt, Martin Heidegger, Friendship and Forgiveness. W. W. Norton. ISBN 978-0-393-07731-5.
  - Chamberlain, Lesley (2 July 2010). "Stranger from Abroad, By Daniel Maier-Katkin". The Independent (Review). Archived from the original on 15 August 2018.
- May, Derwent (1986). Hannah Arendt. Penguin Books. ISBN 978-0-14-008116-9.
- Nixon, Jon (2015). Hannah Arendt and the Politics of Friendship. Bloomsbury Publishing. ISBN 978-1-4725-0754-9.
  - Austerlitz, Saul (9 March 2015). "The Hannah Arendt Guide to Friendship". The New Republic (Review). Archived from the original on 28 August 2018.
- Stangneth, Bettina (2014). Eichmann Before Jerusalem: The Unexamined Life of a Mass Murderer. Knopf Doubleday Publishing Group. ISBN 978-0-307-95968-3. Archived from the original on 3 December 2023.
- Vowinckel, Annette (2004). Hannah Arendt: zwischen deutscher Philosophie und jüdischer Politik [Hannah Arendt: Between German philosophy and Jewish politics] (in German). Lukas Verlag. ISBN 978-3-936872-36-1. Archived from the original on 3 December 2023. (full text)
- Young-Bruehl, Elisabeth (2004) [1982]. Hannah Arendt: For Love of the World (Second ed.). Yale University Press. ISBN 978-0-300-10588-9.

=== Critical works ===
- Aharony, Michal (2015). Hannah Arendt and the Limits of Total Domination: The Holocaust, Plurality, and Resistance. Routledge. ISBN 978-1-134-45789-2.
- Aschheim, Steven E., ed. (2001). Hannah Arendt in Jerusalem [Hannah Arendt Beyerushalayim, Hebrew University of Jerusalem 2007 (in Hebrew)]. University of California Press. ISBN 978-0-520-22057-7.
  - Shenhav, Yehouda (3 May 2007). "All Aboard the Arendt Express". Haaretz (Review). Archived from the original on 31 July 2018.
- Beiner, Ronald; Nedelsky, Jennifer (2001). Judgment, Imagination, and Politics: Themes from Kant and Arendt. Rowman & Littlefield. ISBN 978-0-8476-9971-1.
- Benhabib, Seyla (2003). The Reluctant Modernism of Hannah Arendt. Rowman & Littlefield. ISBN 978-0-7425-2151-3.
- Berkowitz, Roger; Katz, Jeffrey; Keenan, Thomas, eds. (2010). Thinking in Dark Times: Hannah Arendt on Ethics and Politics. Fordham University Press. ISBN 978-0-8232-3075-4.
- Berkowitz, Roger; Storey, Ian, eds. (2017). Artifacts of Thinking: Reading Hannah Arendt's Denktagebuch. Oxford University Press. ISBN 978-0-8232-7217-4.
- Bernauer, J.W., ed. (1987). Amor Mundi: Explorations in the Faith and Thought of Hannah Arendt. Springer Science & Business Media. ISBN 978-94-009-3565-5.
  - Bernauer, James W. (1987a). "The Faith of Hannah Arendt: Amor Mundi and its Critique – Assimilation of Religious Experience". pp. 1–28.
- Bernstein, Richard J. (2013). Hannah Arendt and the Jewish Question. Wiley. ISBN 978-0-7456-6570-2.
- Birmingham, Peg (2006). Hannah Arendt and Human Rights: The Predicament of Common Responsibility. Indiana University Press. ISBN 978-0-253-11226-2. Archived from the original on 3 December 2023.
- Bowen-Moore, Patricia (1989). Hannah Arendt's Philosophy of Natality. Palgrave Macmillan UK. ISBN 978-1-349-20125-9. Archived from the original on 3 December 2023.
- Courtine-Denamy, Sylvie (2000) [1997 Editions Albin Michel]. Trois femmes dans de sombres temps [Three Women in Dark Times: Edith Stein, Hannah Arendt, Simone Weil, or Amor fati, amor mundi]. Translated by G.M. Goshgarian. Cornell University Press. ISBN 978-0-8014-8758-3. Archived from the original on 3 December 2023.
- Dietz, Mary G. (2002). Turning Operations: Feminism, Arendt, and Politics. Routledge. ISBN 978-0-415-93244-8.
- d'Entrèves, Maurizio Passerin (2002) [1994]. The Political Philosophy of Hannah Arendt. Routledge. ISBN 978-1-134-88196-3. Archived from the original on 3 December 2023.
- Faye, Emmanuel (2016). Arendt et Heidegger: Extermination nazie et destruction de la pensée (in French). Albin Michel. ISBN 978-2-226-42113-5.
  - Roza, Stéphanie (23 October 2017). "Emmanuel Faye, Arendt et Heidegger. Extermination nazie et destruction de la pensée, Paris, Albin Michel, collection " Bibliothèque Idées ", 2016, 560 pages, 29 €". Dissidences (Review) (in French). Archived from the original on 18 August 2018.
- Goldoni, Marco; McCorkindale, Christopher, eds. (2012). Hannah Arendt and the Law. Bloomsbury Publishing. ISBN 978-1-84731-932-6. Archived from the original on 3 December 2023.
- Grunenberg, Antonia [in German] (2018). "Hannah Arendt-Studien / Hannah Arendt Studies" (in English and German). Peter Lang. Archived from the original on 28 August 2018.
- Hansen, Phillip (2013) [1993]. Hannah Arendt: Politics, History and Citizenship. Polity. ISBN 978-0-7456-6694-5. Archived from the original on 3 December 2023.
- Harms, Klaus (2003). Hannah Arendt und Hans Jonas: Grundlagen einer philosophischen Theologie der Weltverantwortung (in German). WiKu-Verlag. ISBN 978-3-936749-84-7.
- Hermsen, Joke J. (2022). A good and dignified life : the political advice of Hannah Arendt and Rosa Luxemburg. New Haven: Yale University Press. ISBN 9780300259254.
- Hayden, Patrick, ed. (2014). Hannah Arendt: Key Concepts. Routledge. ISBN 978-1-317-54588-0. Archived from the original on 3 December 2023.
- Hermsen, Joke J.; Villa, Dana Richard, eds. (1999). The Judge and the Spectator: Hannah Arendt's Political Philosophy. Peeters Publishers. ISBN 978-90-429-0781-2. Archived from the original on 3 December 2023.
- Heuer, Wolfgang; Heiter, Bernd; Rosenmüller, Stefanie, eds. (2017). Arendt-Handbuch: Leben – Werk – Wirkung (in German). Springer-Verlag. ISBN 978-3-476-05319-0. Archived from the original on 3 December 2023.
- Hinchman, Lewis P.; Hinchman, Sandra, eds. (1994). Hannah Arendt: Critical Essays. SUNY Press. ISBN 978-0-7914-1853-6. Archived from the original on 3 December 2023.
- Jones, Kathleen B. (2013a). Diving for Pearls: A Thinking Journey with Hannah Arendt. Thinking Women Books. ISBN 978-0-9860586-0-8. Archived from the original on 3 December 2023. excerpt, see also Jones (2013)
- Luban, David. Arendt After Jerusalem: The Moral and Legal Philosophy (PDF). To be published. Archived (PDF) from the original on 2018-09-21.
- Kampowski, Stephan (2008). Arendt, Augustine, and the New Beginning: The Action Theory and Moral Thought of Hannah Arendt in the Light of Her Dissertation on St. Augustine. Wm. B. Eerdmans Publishing. ISBN 978-0-8028-2724-1. Archived from the original on 3 December 2023.
- Kiess, John (2016). Hannah Arendt and Theology. Bloomsbury Publishing. ISBN 978-0-567-62851-0. Archived from the original on 3 December 2023.
- Knott, Marie Luise (2014). Unlearning with Hannah Arendt. Translated by David Dollenmayer. Other Press. ISBN 978-1-59051-648-5. Archived from the original on 3 December 2023.
- Kristeva, Julia (2001b). Hannah Arendt: Life is a Narrative. Translated by Frank Collins. University of Toronto Press. ISBN 978-0-8020-3521-9. Archived from the original on 3 December 2023.
- Mahony, Deirdre Lauren (2018). Hannah Arendt's Ethics. Bloomsbury Publishing. ISBN 978-1-350-03416-7. Archived from the original on 3 December 2023.
- May, Larry; Kohn, Jerome, eds. (1997). Hannah Arendt: Twenty Years Later. MIT Press. ISBN 978-0-262-63182-2. Archived from the original on 3 December 2023.
- McGowan, John (1998). Hannah Arendt: An Introduction. University of Minnesota Press. ISBN 978-1-4529-0338-5. Archived from the original on 3 December 2023.
- Ring, Jennifer (1998). The Political Consequences of Thinking: Gender and Judaism in the Work of Hannah Arendt. SUNY Press. ISBN 978-1-4384-1739-4. Archived from the original on 3 December 2023.
- Schwartz, Jonathan Peter (2016). Arendt's Judgment: Freedom, Responsibility, Citizenship. University of Pennsylvania Press. ISBN 978-0-8122-4814-2. Archived from the original on 3 December 2023.
- Skoller, Eleanor Honig (1993). The In-between of Writing: Experience and Experiment in Drabble, Duras, and Arendt. University of Michigan Press. ISBN 978-0-472-10260-0. Archived from the original on 3 December 2023.
- Lyndsey Stonebridge (2024). We Are Free to Change the World: Hannah Arendt's Lessons in Love and Disobedience. Hogarth Press, 2024. ISBN 9780593229736. Retrieved 14 April 2024.
- Swift, Simon (2008). Hannah Arendt. Routledge. ISBN 978-1-134-09355-7. Archived from the original on 3 December 2023.
- Topolski, Anya (2015). Arendt, Levinas and a Politics of Relationality. Rowman & Littlefield International. ISBN 978-1-78348-341-9. Archived from the original on 3 December 2023.
- Villa, Dana (1996). Arendt and Heidegger: The Fate of the Political. Princeton University Press. ISBN 978-1-4008-2184-6. Archived from the original on 3 December 2023.
- — (1999). Politics, Philosophy, Terror: Essays on the Thought of Hannah Arendt. Princeton University Press. ISBN 978-1-4008-2316-1. Archived from the original on 3 December 2023.
- —, ed. (2000). The Cambridge Companion to Hannah Arendt. Cambridge University Press. ISBN 978-0-521-64571-3. text at Pensar el Espacio Público
- Wolin, Richard (2001). Heidegger's children : Hannah Arendt, Karl Löwith, Hans Jonas, and Herbert Marcuse. Princeton: Princeton University Press. ISBN 0691070199.
- Young-Bruehl, Elisabeth (2006). Why Arendt Matters. Yale University Press. ISBN 978-0-300-13619-7. Archived from the original on 3 December 2023.

=== Historical ===
- Augustine, Saint (1995). In Joannis evangelium tractatus [Tractates on the Gospel of John, 111-24]. Translated by John W. Rettig. CUA Press. ISBN 978-0-8132-0092-7. Archived from the original on 3 December 2023.
- — (2008). Tractatus in epistolam Joannis ad Parthos [Homilies on the First Epistle of John]. Translated by Boniface Ramsay. New City Press. ISBN 978-1-56548-289-0. Archived from the original on 3 December 2023., available in Latin as
  - — (1837). Sancti Aurelii Augustini Hipponensis episcopi Opera omnia: post Lovaniensium theologorum recensionem castigata denuo ad manuscriptos codices gallicanos, vaticanos, belgicos etc. necnon ad editiones antiquiores et castigatiores (in Latin). apud Gaume fratres. Archived from the original on 3 December 2023.
- Kant, Immanuel (2006) [1798]. Anthropologie in pragmatischer Hinsicht [Anthropology from a Pragmatic Point of View]. Translated by Robert Louden. Cambridge University Press. ISBN 978-0-521-67165-1. Archived from the original on 3 December 2023.
- — (1793). Die Religion innerhalb der Grenzen der bloßen Vernunft. Friedrich Nicolovius. p. 99. Archived from the original on 8 September 2020.
- — (1838). Religion Within the Boundary of Pure Reason. Translated by J. W. Semple. Thomas Clark. p. 125.
- Lazare, Bernard (2016) [1898 Kadimah, Paris]. Le Nationalisme Juif. Hachette Livre. ISBN 978-2-01-359879-8. Archived from the original on 3 December 2023. facsimile text at Gallica, and reproduced on Wikisource
- Rühle-Gerstel, Alice (1932). Das Frauenproblem der Gegenwart: eine psychologische Bilanz [Contemporary Women's Issues: A psychological balance sheet] (in German). S. Hirzel. Archived from the original on 3 December 2023.
- Weber, Max (1978) [1922]. Roth, Guenther; Wittich, Claus (eds.). Wirtschaft und Gesellschaft: Grundriss der verstehenden Soziologie [Economy and Society: An Outline of Interpretive Sociology]. University of California Press. ISBN 978-0-520-03500-3. Archived from the original on 3 December 2023. full text available on Internet Archive
- Weil, Hans [in German] (1967) [1930]. Die Entstehung des deutschen Bildungsprinzips [The Origin of the German Educational Principle]. H. Bouvier. Archived from the original on 3 December 2023.

== Chapters and contributions ==
- Baier, Annette C (1997). Ethics in many different voices. pp. 325–346., in May & Kohn (1997)
- — (1998). Ethics in many different voices. pp. 247–268., in Adamson, Freadman & Parker (1998)
- Beiner, Ronald (1997). Love and worldliness: Hannah Arendt's reading of Saint Augustine. pp. 269–284., in May & Kohn (1997)
- Brocke, Edna [in German] (2009a). Afterword. "Big Hannah" – My Aunt. pp. 512–522., in Arendt, Hannah (2009a) [2007 Schocken Books]. Kohn, Jerome; Feldman, Ron H (eds.). The Jewish Writings. Knopf Doubleday Publishing Group. ISBN 978-0-307-49628-7.
- Canovan, Margaret (2013). Introduction. University of Chicago Press. pp. vii–xx. ISBN 978-0-226-92457-1. Archived from the original on 3 December 2023., in Arendt, Hannah (2013) [1958]. The Human Condition (Second ed.). University of Chicago Press. ISBN 978-0-226-92457-1. Archived from the original on 3 December 2023.
- Dries, Christian (2011). Günther Anders und Hannah Arendt - eine Beziehungsskizze (in German). pp. 71–140., in Anders (2011)
- Elon, Amos (2006a). Introduction. Penguin. p. xxi. ISBN 978-1-101-00716-7. Archived from the original on 3 December 2023., in Arendt, Hannah (2006a) [1963, Viking Press, revised 1968]. Eichmann in Jerusalem: A Report on the Banality of Evil. Penguin Publishing Group. ISBN 978-1-101-00716-7.
- Fry, Karin (2014). Natality (PDF). pp. 23–35. Archived (PDF) from the original on 2018-09-11., in Hayden (2014)
- Guilherme, Alexandre and Morgan, W. John, 'Hannah Arendt (1906–1975)-dialogue as a public space'. Chapter 4 in Philosophy, Dialogue, and Education: Nine modern European philosophers, Routledge, pp. 55–71, ISBN 978-1-138-83149-0.
- Gould, Carol (2009). Hannah Arendt and Remembrance. Rowman & Littlefield Publishers. pp. 65–72. ISBN 978-1-4616-3656-4. Archived from the original on 3 December 2023., in Richter (2009)
- Kippenberger, Hans (8 February 1936). 376a. Vertraulicher Bericht Kippenbergers uber den Parteiselbstschutz (PSS) der KPD [Confidential report by Kippenberger on the party self-protection of the KPD]. pp. 1182–1185., in Weber et al (2014)
- Luban, David (1994). Explaining Dark Times: Hannah Arendt's Theory of Theory. pp. 79–110., in Hinchman & Hinchman (1994)
- Mehring, Frank. "Holocaust Consciousness: Hannah Arendt." The Democratic Gap: Transcultural Confrontations of German Immigrants and the Promise of American Democracy, edited by Frank Mehring, Heidelberg: Universitätsverlag Winter, 2014, pp. 301-354.
- Scott, Joanna Vecchiarelli; Stark, Judith Chelius (1996). Preface: Rediscovering Love and Saint Augustine. University of Chicago Press. pp. vii–xviii. ISBN 978-0-226-02596-4. Archived from the original on 3 December 2023., in Arendt, Hannah (1996). Scott, Joanna Vecchiarelli; Stark, Judith Chelius (eds.). Love and Saint Augustine. University of Chicago Press. ISBN 978-0-226-02596-4.
- Vollrath, Ernst (1997). Hannah Arendt: A German-American Jewess views the United States - and looks back to Germany. pp. 45–58., in Kielmansegg et al (1997)
- Weyembergh, Maurice (1999). Remembrance and Oblivion. Peeters Publishers. pp. 79–96. ISBN 978-90-429-0781-2. Archived from the original on 3 December 2023., in Hermsen & Villa (1999)

== Dictionaries and encyclopedias ==
- Das Aussprachewörterbuch (in German) (7th ed.). Duden. 2015.
- Baron, Salo (2007). "Conference on Jewish Social Studies". Encyclopaedia Judaica. Thomson Gale. Archived from the original on 6 January 2019.
- Duignan, Brian (4 June 2015). "Hannah Arendt: American political scientist". Encyclopædia Britannica. Archived from the original on 23 July 2018.
- d'Entreves, Maurizio Passerin (2014). "Hannah Arendt". Stanford Encyclopedia of Philosophy. Stanford University. Archived from the original on 30 January 2019. (Version: January 2019)
- Honderich, Ted, ed. (2005). "Arendt, Hannah (1906–1975)". The Oxford Companion to Philosophy. OUP. p. 149. ISBN 978-0-19-103747-4. Archived from the original on 3 December 2023.
- Hyman, Paula; Moore, Deborah Dash, eds. (1998). "Jewish Women in America: A-L". Jewish Women in America: An Historical Encyclopedia. Vol. I: A-L. Routledge. ISBN 978-0-415-91934-0. Archived from the original on 3 December 2023.
  - Whitfield, Stephen J. (1998). Hannah Arendt (1906 - 1975). pp. 61–64. Archived from the original on 19 July 2018., in Hyman & Moore (1998)
- Lovett, Frank (4 June 2018). "Republicanism". Stanford Encyclopedia of Philosophy. Stanford University. Archived from the original on 25 October 2018.
- Wood, Kelsey (7 January 2004). "Hannah Arendt". The Literary Encyclopedia. The Literary Dictionary Company Limited. Archived from the original on 24 July 2018.
- Yar, Majid. "Hannah Arendt (1906—1975)". Internet Encyclopedia of Philosophy. Archived from the original on 19 July 2018.
- "Hannah Arendt". Encyclopedia of World Biography. The Gale Group. 2010. Archived from the original on 22 April 2017.
- Cullen-DuPont, Kathryn (2014) [1996]. "Arendt, Hannah (1906—1975)". Encyclopedia of Women's History in America (2nd ed.). Infobase Publishing. ISBN 978-1-4381-1033-2.

== Magazines ==
- Adelman, Jeremy (Spring 2016). "Pariah: Can Hannah Arendt Help Us Rethink Our Global Refugee Crisis?". Wilson Quarterly. Archived from the original on 6 October 2018.
- Austerlitz, Saul (30 May 2013). "A New Movie Perpetuates the Pernicious Myth of Hannah Arendt". The New Republic. Archived from the original on 15 February 2020.
- Bernstein, Richard (19 August 2018a). "The Urgent Relevance of Hannah Arendt". The Philosophers' Magazine. No. 82. pp. 24–31. Archived from the original on 15 February 2020.
- Browning, Christopher R. (20 June 2013). "How Ordinary Germans Did It". The New York Review of Books. Archived from the original on 8 September 2018.
- Gellhorn, Martha (February 1962). "Eichmann and the Private Conscience". Atlantic Monthly., reprinted in Gellhorn (1988, pp. 217–233)
- Heinrich, Kaspar (19 November 2013). "Fotografien von Fred Stein: Der Poet mit der Kleinbildkamera". Der Spiegel (in German). Archived from the original on 20 October 2017.
- Held, Virginia; Kazin, Alfred (21 October 1982). "Feminism & Hannah Arendt". The New York Review of Books. Archived from the original on 15 February 2020.
- Howe, Irving (5 June 2013). "Banality and Brilliance". Dissent. Archived from the original on 7 September 2018., reprinted from Howe (1984, pp. 269ff)
- Jones, Kathleen B. (12 November 2013). "Hannah Arendt's Female Friends". Los Angeles Review of Books. Archived from the original on 19 August 2018., reprinted in Jones (2013a)
- — (March–April 2014). "The Trial of Hannah Arendt". Humanities. Vol. 35, no. 2. Archived from the original on 17 August 2018.
- Kirsch, Adam (12 January 2009). "Beware of Pity: Hannah Arendt and the power of the impersonal". The New Yorker. Archived from the original on 18 July 2018.
- Kohler, Lotte (21 March 1996). "The Arendt/Heidegger Affair". The New York Review of Books. Archived from the original on 15 February 2020.
- Maier-Katkin, Daniel (2010). "How Hannah Arendt Was Labeled an "Enemy of Israel"". Tikkun. Vol. 25, no. 6. pp. 11–14. ISSN 2164-0041. Archived from the original on 9 March 2021.
- Maier-Katkin, Daniel; Stoltzfus, Nathan (10 June 2013). "Hannah Arendt on Trial". The American Scholar. Archived from the original on 26 July 2018.
- Obermair, Hannes (April 2018). "Da Hans a Hannah—il "duce" di Bolzano e la sfida di Arendt" [From Hans to Hannah—Mussolini in Bolzano and Arendt's Challenge]. Il Cristallo. Rassegna di Varia Umanità (in Italian). Vol. 60, no. 1. pp. 27–32. ISBN 978-88-7223-312-2. ISSN 0011-1449. Archived from the original on 16 October 2021.
- Robin, Corey (1 June 2015). "The Trials of Hannah Arendt". The Nation. Archived from the original on 6 December 2019.
- Seliger, Ralph (15 April 2011). "Hannah Arendt: From Iconoclast to Icon". Tikkun. Archived from the original on 30 March 2016.
- Wieseltier, Leon (7 October 1981a). "Understanding Anti-Semitism: Hannah Arendt on the origins of prejudice". The New Republic. Archived from the original on 2 September 2018.
- Wieseltier, Leon (14 October 1981b). "Pariahs and Politics: Hannah Arendt and the Jews". The New Republic. Archived from the original on 3 September 2018.

== Newspapers ==
- Avineri, Shlomo (3 March 2010). "Where Hannah Arendt Went Wrong". Haaretz. Archived from the original on 13 August 2018.
- Berkowitz, Roger (7 July 2013a). "Misreading 'Eichmann in Jerusalem'". The New York Times (Opinionator: The Stone). Archived from the original on 19 September 2018.
- Bernstein, Richard J. (20 June 2018b). "The Illuminations of Hannah Arendt". The New York Times. Archived from the original on 15 February 2020.
- Bird, David (4 December 1975a). "Hannah Arendt, Political Scientist Dead". The New York Times (Obituary). Archived from the original on 3 May 2021.
- Bird, David (5 December 1975b). "Hannah Arendt, Political Scientist Dead". The New York Times. Archived from the original on 8 March 2021.
- Butler, Judith (29 August 2011). "Hannah Arendt's challenge to Adolf Eichmann". The Guardian. Archived from the original on 16 December 2018.
- Frantzman, Seth J. (5 June 2016). "Hannah Arendt, white supremacist It's time to admit that through Arendt's writing runs a thread of European white supremacy". The Jerusalem Post. Archived from the original on 15 February 2020.
- Gassner, Peter (30 November 2014). "Eine philosophische Liebe in Marburg". Oberheissische Presse (in German). Archived from the original on 19 August 2018.
- Grenier, Elizabeth (2 February 2017). "Why the world is turning to Hannah Arendt to explain Trump". DW. Archived from the original on 15 February 2020.
- Hanlon, Aaron (31 August 2018). "Postmodernism didn't cause Trump. It explains him". Washington Post. Archived from the original on 12 September 2018.
- Invernizzi-Accetti, Carlo (6 December 2017). "A small Italian town can teach the world how to defuse controversial monuments". The Guardian. Archived from the original on 5 September 2018.
- Kakutani, Michiko (14 July 2018a). "The death of truth: how we gave up on facts and ended up with Trump". The Guardian. Archived from the original on 3 September 2018.
- Kaplan, Fred (24 May 2013). "'Hannah Arendt' Directed by Margarethe von Trotta". The New York Times. Archived from the original on 8 September 2018.
- Kramer, Henri (1 March 2017). "Gedenktafel für Hannah Arendt in Babelsberg". Potsdamer Neueste Nachrichten (in German). Archived from the original on 16 September 2018.
- Moreira, Cristiana Faria (23 December 2017). "Hannah Arendt. A passagem por Lisboa a caminho da liberdade". Publico (in Portuguese). Archived from the original on 22 October 2020.
- Pfeffer, Anshel (9 May 2008). "Dear Hannah". Haaretz. Archived from the original on 8 January 2018.
- Sznaider, Natan (20 October 2006). "Human, citizen, Jew". Haaretz. Archived from the original on 20 October 2017.
- Tavares, Rui (10 December 2018). "Hannah Arendt em Lisboa". Publico (in Portuguese). Archived from the original on 6 October 2019.
- Walters, Guy (19 January 2015). "Don't be fooled – Eichmann was a monster". The Telegraph. Archived from the original on 11 January 2022.
- Williams, Zoe (1 February 2017). "Totalitarianism in the age of Trump: lessons from Hannah Arendt". The Guardian. Archived from the original on 28 June 2020.
- "Killer of 6,000,000; Adolf Eichmann". The New York Times. 26 May 1960. p. 18. Archived from the original on 15 February 2020.
- "'Show' Trial Promised". The New York Times. 28 May 1960. p. 9. Archived from the original on 15 February 2020.

== Theses ==
- Abt, Ryan Nolan (May 2015). Representations of the Holocaust in Texas World History Textbooks from 1947 to 1980 (PDF) (MA thesis). University of Texas at Arlington. Archived (PDF) from the original on 22 August 2018.
- Bertheau, Anne (2016). "Das Mädchen aus der Fremde": Hannah Arendt und die Dichtung: Rezeption – Reflexion – Produktion (PhD thesis) (in German). transcript Verlag for Department of Germanic Studies (Études germaniques), Sorbonne, 2010. ISBN 978-3-8394-3268-6. Archived from the original on 3 December 2023. (at Theses.fr)
- Herman, Dana (2008). Hashavat Avedah: a history of Jewish Cultural Reconstruction, Inc (PhD thesis). Department of History, McGill University. Archived from the original on 3 December 2023.
- Honkasalo, Julian (2016). Sisterhood, Natality, Queer: Reframing Feminist Interpretations of Hannah Arendt (PhD thesis). Department of Philosophy, History, Culture and Art Studies. University of Helsinki. ISBN 978-951-51-1896-7. Archived from the original (PDF) on 20 October 2017.
- Miller, Joshua A (August 2010). Hannah Arendt's theory of deliberative judgement (PhD thesis). Pennsylvania State University. Archived from the original on 9 March 2021.

== Websites ==
- Ali, Amro (25 April 2017). ""We Refugees" – an essay by Hannah Arendt". Archived from the original on 23 December 2019.
- Fry, Karin (2009). "Hannah Arendt 1906–1975: Philosophy of Mind, Social & Political Philosophy". Women Philosophers. Society for the Study of Women Philosophers. Archived from the original on 24 July 2018.
- "Hannah Arendt's 108th Birthday". Google Doodle Archives. 14 October 2014. Archived from the original on 14 October 2018.
- Onfray, Michel (2014). "Contre-histoire de la philosophie – Saison 12: La pensée post-nazie" (Podcast). France Culture.
- "Fred Stein: Hannah Arendt, photograph (1944): Philosopher in a contemplative pose". Arts in Exile (Virtual exhibition). Archived from the original on 2 August 2018.
- Young-Bruehl, Elizabeth (28 January 2011). "Who's Afraid of Social Democracy" (Blog). Archived from the original on 28 January 2011.
- Barry, James, ed. (2017). "Arendt Studies" (journal). Archived from the original on 15 August 2018.
- Addison, Sam (1972–1974). "Hannah Arendt: The Life of the Mind". Gifford Lectures. University of Aberdeen. Archived from the original on 15 February 2020.
- "Hannah Arendt & the University of Heidelberg". Between Truth and Hope. 30 October 2016. Archived from the original on 29 August 2018.
- Rosenthal, Abigail L. (17 February 2018). "Spoiling One's Story: The Case of Hannah Arendt". VoegelinView. Archived from the original on 29 August 2018.
- "Pensar el Espacio Público ~ Seminario de Filosofía Política" (in Spanish). 2014–2015. Archived from the original on 31 August 2018.
- "Hannah Arendt. Vertrauen in das Menschliche" (PDF) (Exhibition brochure) (in German). Goethe Institut. 2011. Archived (PDF) from the original on 2018-09-01.
- Krieghofer, Gerald (1 July 2017). ""Niemand hat das Recht zu gehorchen." Hannah Arendt (angeblich)". Zitaträtsel. Archived from the original on 5 September 2018.
- Miller, Joshua A. (25 September 2017). "How the Schocken Books collections changed Arendt scholarship". Anotherpanacea. Archived from the original on 5 September 2018.
- "Obedience and Dictatorship". Desperado Philosophy. 22 December 2017. Archived from the original on 7 September 2018.
- Wolters, Eugene (16 July 2013). "Everyone is Wrong About Hannah Arendt". Critical-Theory. Archived from the original on 6 September 2018.
- Hill, Samantha Rose (26 March 2017). "What does it mean to love the world? Hannah Arendt and Amor Mundi". openDemocracy. Archived from the original on 8 September 2018.
- "Ten things Hannah Arendt said that are eerily relevant in today's political times". Scroll.in. 4 December 2017. Archived from the original on 1 October 2019.
- Brecht, Bertolt. "An die Nachgeborenen". Lyrik-line: Listen to the poet (in German). Haus für Poesie. Archived from the original on 15 September 2018. – includes Brecht reading (english)
- Waterhouse, Peter (July 2013). "Truth And Translation". European Institute for Progressive Cultural Policies (EIPCP). Archived from the original on 19 September 2018.
- Coombes, Thomas (12 February 2017). "Why we all need to read 'The Origins of Totalitarianism'". Medium. Archived from the original on 20 September 2018.
- Gold, Hannah (29 January 2017). "Amazon Needs to Restock Hannah Arendt's The Origins of Totalitarianism". Jezebel. Archived from the original on 30 August 2018.
- "Hannah Arendt". kulturreise-ideen (in German). Archived from the original on 3 December 2023.
- Hill, Samantha Rose (6 December 2015). "A Meditation on Arendt, Rilke, & Guns". Hannah Arendt Center. Archived from the original on 14 April 2021.
- Rilke, Rainer Maria (1912–1922). "Duineser Elegien" (in German). Zeno. Archived from the original on 18 October 2018. (English translation by A. S. Kline 2004)
- Paula, Luisa (28 December 2018). "Hannah Arendt em Lisboa". Espaço Crítico (in Portuguese). Archived from the original on 21 February 2019.

=== Biography, genealogy and timelines ===
see also: Principal Dates in — (January 2000). Baehr, Peter (ed.). The Portable Hannah Arendt. Penguin Books. ISBN 978-0-14-026974-1.

- AAAL. "Academy Members: Deceased". Members. American Academy of Arts and Letters. Archived from the original on 8 October 2020.
- Heller, Anne C (6 July 2015a). "Hannah Arendt: A Brief Chronology". Anne C. Heller. Archived from the original on 17 August 2018.
- Ludz, Ursula (2005). "Vita Hannah Arendt". HannahArendt.net (in German). pp. 251–256. Archived from the original on 4 March 2016., in — (2005). Ludz, Ursula (ed.). Ich will verstehen: Selbstauskünfte zu Leben und Werk; mit einer vollständigen Bibliographie (in German). Piper. ISBN 978-3-492-24591-3.
- "Hannah Arendt". Monoskop. 24 July 2018. Archived from the original on 27 July 2018.
- Young-Bruehl, Elisabeth (1999) [Online: February 2000]. "Arendt, Hannah". American National Biography. 1. Oxford University Press. doi:10.1093/anb/9780198606697.article.1400024.
- "Hannah Arendt". Contemporary Thinkers. The Foundation for Constitutional Government. 2018. Archived from the original on 15 March 2016.

=== Institutions, locations and organizations ===
- Bernstein, Richard J. (2017). "Hannah Arendt Center". The New School for Social Research. Archived from the original on 15 August 2018.
- Bhabha, Homi K.; Weigel, Sigrid (March 2018). "We Refugees« – 75 Years Later. Hannah Arendt's Reflections on Human Rights and the Human Condition". Zentrum für Literatur- und Kulturforschung. Archived from the original on 26 November 2018.
- "Hannah Arendt Centre". Institut für Philosophie: Carl von Ossietzky Universität Oldenburg. Archived from the original on 3 December 2023.
- "Hannah Arendt Center for Political Studies". Department of Human Sciences, University of Verona. 2018. Archived from the original on 11 September 2018.
- "Hannah Arendt Gymnasium, Haßloch" (in German). Archived from the original on 31 July 2018.
- "Hannah Arendt Gymnasium, Barsinghausen" (in German). Archived from the original on 31 July 2018.
- "Hannah Arendt Gymnasium, Lengerich" (in German). Schulen in Lengerich. 2018. Archived from the original on 11 July 2018.
- "Hannah Arendt Gymnasium, Berlin" (in German). 2018. Archived from the original on 14 August 2018.
- Dries, Christian (July 2018). "Vita Günther Anders (1902–1992)". Translated by Christopher John Müller. Internationale Günther Anders Gesellschaft. Archived from the original on 14 October 2017.
- Kirscher, Gilbert (27 March 2003). "Éric Weil: A Biography". Institut Eric Weil-Université de Lille. Archived from the original on 28 August 2018.
- GDW (2016). "Hannah Arendt". Exile and Resistance. German Resistance Memorial Center. Archived from the original on 20 September 2018.
- "Hannah Arendt Tage". Das offizielle Portal der Region und der Landeshauptstadt Hannover. City of Hanover. Archived from the original on 28 July 2018.
  - "Hannah Arendt in Hannover". Das offizielle Portal der Region und der Landeshauptstadt Hannover. City of Hanover. 22 August 2017. Archived from the original on 15 February 2020.
- CAS (2011). "Guide to the Center for Advanced Studies Records, 1958 – 1969". Wesleyan University Library. Archived from the original on 24 June 2018.
- UNHCR (2 August 2017). "Arendt, Hannah". UNHCR Central Europe. Archived from the original on 2 August 2018.
- FBI (30 April 1956). "Hannah Arendt" (Memorandum to Director).
- "Orte des Erinnerns – Denkmal im Bayerischen Viertel, 1993 (Berlin-Schöneberg)" (in German). Kunstgeschichtliche Gesellschaft zu Berlin. 2018. Archived from the original on 20 September 2018.

==== Hannah Arendt Center (Bard) ====
- "The Hannah Arendt Center for Politics and Humanities at Bard College". Archived from the original on 14 August 2018.
  - "McCarthy House". About Us. The Hannah Arendt Center. Archived from the original on 19 September 2018.
  - Bard. "The Hannah Arendt Collection". Hannah Arendt Center, Stevenson Library, Bard College. Archived from the original on 27 July 2018.
    - Kettler, David (2009). "Hannah Arendt Collection: Arendt on Mannheim". Archived from the original on 21 September 2018.
  - "The Hannah Arendt Center". Medium. Archived from the original on 20 September 2018.
  - "Amor Mundi". Medium. Archived from the original on 27 October 2018.
  - Berkowitz, Roger (9 March 2012b). "Jacques Ranciere and Hannah Arendt on Democratic Politics". Hannah Arendt Center News. Archived from the original on 14 April 2021.
  - "Film Screening: In Search of The Last Agora". Hannah Arendt Center News. 15 November 2018. Archived from the original on 28 September 2020.

=== Maps ===
- "Hannah-Arendt-Str., Marburg". Meinestadt.de (in German). 2018. Archived from the original on 6 October 2018.
- "Rue Hannah Arendt". Google Maps. Archived from the original on 8 October 2018.

== External images ==
- "Hannah Arendt (1906–1975)". Internet Encyclopedia of Philosophy (Photograph of commemorative stamp). 1988. Archived from the original on 8 August 2018.
- "Hannah Arendt, stamp, Germany 2006" (Photograph of commemorative stamp). UNHCR. 2006. Archived from the original on 12 January 2018.
- "Map of location of Hannah Arendt Straße, Berlin". GeoHack (Map). Archived from the original on 31 July 2018.
- Stein, Fred (2018). "Hannah Arendt, 1944". Portrait Portfolio (Photographic portrait). Fred Stein Archive. Archived from the original on 2 August 2018.
- "Hannah Arendts Erkennungskarte der Universität Heidelberg 1928". Bild des Monats (Student identity card). University of Heidelberg. November 2015. Archived from the original on 29 August 2018.
- Arendt, Hannah (1975). Life of the Mind: Judging (manuscript page). University of Chicago Press. ISBN 978-0-226-02595-7. Archived from the original on 3 December 2023.(First page of "Judging", found in her typewriter)
- "Cover". Saturday Review of Literature (Cover image). 24 March 1951. Archived from the original on 26 September 2018.
- "Plaque". Lisbon City Council. 10 December 2018. Archived from the original on 24 February 2021.
