= Abraham Luxemburg =

Polish businessperson

- אברהם לוכסמבורג
- Born: c. 1800s Warsaw, Russian Empire
- Died: c. 1870s (age approx. 70); Berlin, German Empire
- Occupation: Businessperson
- Spouses: Chana Zslam (m. 1828; died 1848); Amalia Lewinsztajn (m. 1848; died 1861); Golda Lewinsztajn (m. 1862; died 1863)
- Children: 10 (including Edward Luxemburg)
- Parents: Elisza Luxemburg (father); Szayndla Luxemburg (mother)
- Relatives: Rosa Luxemburg (granddaughter)

Abraham Luxemburg was a Polish businessperson and patron of the Haskalah (Jewish Enlightenment). Having made his wealth in the timber industry in Zamość, Luxemburg supported the movements of Reform Judaism and Jewish assimilation, overseeing his own family's integration into Polish society. He was married three times and had ten children, including Edward Luxemburg, the father of Rosa Luxemburg.

== Early life ==
Abraham Luxemburg was born in Warsaw in the early 19th century, the son of Elisza and Szayndla Luxemburg, a poor Polish Jewish couple. He came into the world at a time when the Polish capital was occupied by the Russian Empire and Polish Jews faced increasing levels of antisemitism. In 1828, Luxemburg married Chana Zslam and moved to Zamość, a city with a predominantly Jewish population.

When the November Uprising broke out in 1830, a number of Luxemburg's friends, including Yehoshua Margolis, supported the insurrection. But as he was still a newlywed and taking care of his pregnant wife, Luxemburg himself was not prominently involved. During the rising, Chana gave birth to their first child, Edward Luxemburg. After the uprising was suppressed, many Jewish families fled the city to escape an antisemitic pogrom which was perpetrated by the Imperial Russian Army.

== Career ==
Luxemburg himself established a successful timber business in Zamość and developed links with both the Russian east and German west.

His business notably gained clients in the German cities of Berlin, Danzig, Hamburg and Leipzig, and he also did business with the Imperial Russian Army. His business made him a wealthy man, which allowed him to raise his family's social status and to support the nascent rise of Reform Judaism. I. L. Peretz later described him as one of the wealthiest men in the city.

== Personal life ==
With his wealth, he provided financial backing to the Haskalah (Jewish Enlightenment) in Zamość. During the 1830s, he oversaw a "golden age" in the cultural movement, notably contributing to the publication of Feivel Schiffer's 1840 novel Hazrot ha-Shir. At the time, members of the Haskalah sought to teach Jews how to speak Polish in order to promote Jewish assimilation. Luxemburg oversaw the assimilation of his own family into Polish society. Luxemburg spoke the Yiddish and Polish languages, and taught his children both languages as well. Breaking with Orthodox Judaism, and gravitating closer to Polish nationalism, Luxemburg encouraged his children to consider themselves Polish people, to speak the Polish language and to immerse themselves in Polish culture. He also provided his sons with an education in Prussia.

Luxemburg had seven more children with Chana: Leyba Ber (b. 1833), Max (b. 1836), Maier (b. 1838), Tema (b. 1842), Leonora (b. 1842) and Julian (b. 1844). After Chana died in 1848, Luxemburg married Amalia Lewinsztajn, a Rabbi's daughter from Międzyrzecz. After giving birth to two children, Amalia also died in 1861. Luxemburg then married her younger sister, Golda Lewinsztajn, but she too died only a year later. In 1862, Luxemburg sold his house in Zamość to his son Edward and moved back to Warsaw. The following year, the repression of the January Uprising caused him to lose much of his money and forced him to flee the country. In the 1870s or 1880s, he died in Berlin. His son Edward inherited his timber business, and continued his work of supporting Jewish assimilation.

== Bibliography ==
- Castle, Rory (2012). ""You alone will make our family's name famous" Rosa Luxemburg, Her Family and the Origins of her Polish-Jewish Identity". Praktyka Teoretyczna (6): 93–125. doi:10.14746/prt.2012.6.9.
- Ettinger, Elzbieta (1995) [1986]. Rosa Luxemburg: A Life. HarperCollins. ISBN 0-86358-261-3.
- Frölich, Paul (1972) [1939]. Rosa Luxemburg: Her Life and Work. Translated by Hoornweg, Johanna. Pluto Press. LCCN 72-81776.
- Jacob, Frank (2021). Rosa Luxemburg: Living and Thinking the Revolution. Büchner-Verlag. ISBN 978-3-96317-249-6.
- Nettl, John Peter (1966). Rosa Luxemburg. Vol. 1. Oxford University Press. OCLC 1120873221.
- Nixon, Jon (2018). Rosa Luxemburg and the Struggle for Democratic Renewal. Pluto Press. ISBN 978-0-7453-3652-7.
