= Steve Rayner =

British social scientist

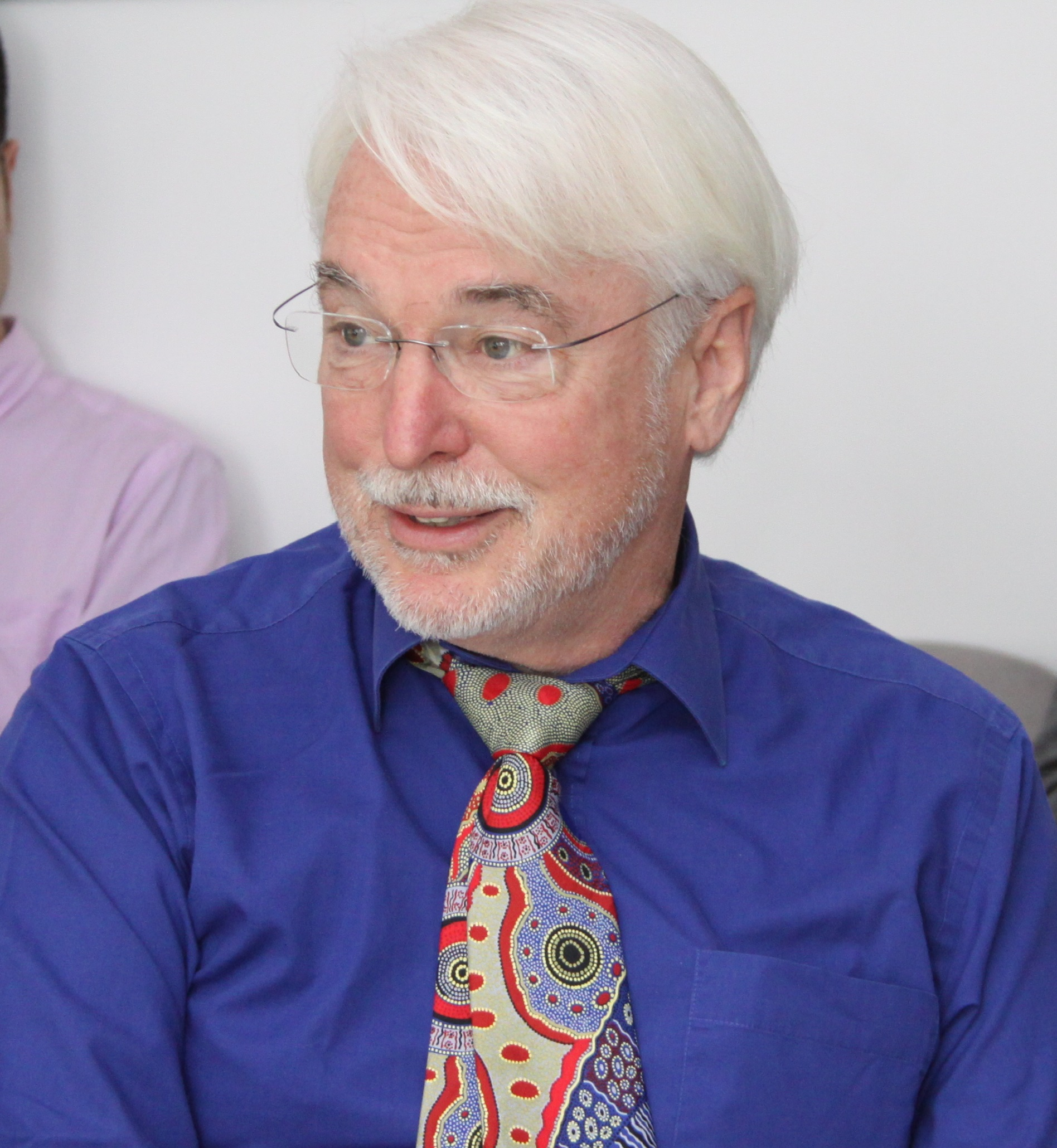
- Born: 22 May 1953
- Died: 17 January 2020 (aged 66)
- Known for: Climate change policy

Steve Rayner (22 May 1953 – 17 January 2020) was James Martin Professor of Science and Civilization at Oxford University and Director of the Institute for Science, Innovation and Society, a member of the Oxford Martin School. He described himself as an "undisciplined social scientist" having been trained in philosophy, comparative religion (BA University of Kent) and political anthropology (PhD University College London).

A key research interest was climate policy, in particular adaptation and geoengineering as ways to mitigate climate change's effects. He was an outspoken critic of the architecture of the Kyoto Protocol, and his paper The Wrong Trousers: Radically Rethinking Climate Policy, co-written with Gwyn Prins of the London School of Economics has been widely cited on this topic. He was also interested in wicked problems, uncomfortable knowledge and clumsy solutions. He was principal investigator of the Oxford Programme for the Future of Cities and co-director of the Oxford Geoengineering Programme. In 2008, he was listed by Wired Magazine as one of the 15 people the next President should listen to and was recognized for his contribution to the joint award of the 2007 Nobel Peace Prize to the Intergovernmental Panel on Climate Change (IPCC).

== Academic interests ==
Influenced by his PhD supervisor and colleague, the anthropologist Dame Mary Douglas, his underlying theoretical interest was in the use of ideas about nature to justify moral and political preferences. Having spent much of his research career outside of academia, he also professed a commitment to "changing the world through social science". His doctoral research applied and developed Douglas's Cultural Theory studying the organizational dynamics of British far-left groups in the mid-20th century. He focused particularly on the tendency of Trotskyist sects and the Maoist Workers' Institute of Marxism–Leninism – Mao Zedong Thought group to factionalism and split as well as their propensity to entertain millenarian ideas of social change. Subsequent work explored the role of organizational culture in the perception and management of environmental, technological and health risks as well as the political culture of climate change.

== Major works ==
Rayner authored or co-authored over 175 published works, including nine books, and is Series Editor of the Earthscan Science in Society book series. He co-edited, with Elizabeth Malone, of the four volume assessment of social science relevant to understanding climate change and its governance, in addition to maintaining a consistent critique of the mainstream policy architecture for climate policy.

The 2007 report The Wrong Trousers: Radically Rethinking Climate Policy, summarized in the Nature commentary Time to Ditch Kyoto, claimed that the Framework Convention on Climate Change and Kyoto Protocol were based on erroneous premises, and called instead for massive public investment in energy research, development, demonstration and deployment (RDD&D). The Wrong Trousers was followed by How to Get Climate Policy Back on Course and subsequently The Hartwell Paper, which argued that the 2009 Copenhagen Climate Summit, marked the crash of the Kyoto Protocol, which had "failed to produce any discernable real world reductions in emissions of greenhouse gases in fifteen years."

Rayner's later work addressed problematic issues in the relationship between science and governance as well as the governance of science. He expressed concerns about attempts to resolve clashes in values either through appeals to science on the one hand or through extensive public participation on the other. His latter efforts in this area focused on the emerging technologies of climate change geoengineering and he was a co-author on the influential Royal Society report Geoengineering the Climate and lead author of the Oxford Principles for Geoengineering Governance.

He gave nearly 150 invited lectures and conference presentations on topics such as climate policy, risk and governance, including the Jack Beale Memorial Lecture on Global Environment at the University of New South Wales, Australia

== Early career ==
Before his appointment at Oxford University, Steve Rayner was a Professor of Environment and Public Affairs at the School of International and Public Affairs, Columbia University, where he directed the Center for Science, Technology, and Environmental Policy. He also held parallel appointments as Professor of Sociology and as the Chief Social Scientist at the International Research Institute for Climate Prediction. Before Columbia University, he held the rank of Chief Scientist at the Pacific Northwest National Laboratory. Located in the Washington DC office, he led the Global Change Research Group from 1991 to 1996. Previously, he was Deputy Director of the Global Environmental Studies Center at Oak Ridge National Laboratory where he was responsible for research in Policy, Energy and Human Systems. Throughout this period he also held visiting or adjunct appointments at Cornell University, Virginia Tech, Boston University and the University of Tennessee.

== Other honors and affiliations ==
Rayner was a Professorial Fellow of Keble College and Honorary Professor of Climate Change and Society at the University of Copenhagen. He was also a Senior Fellow of the Breakthrough Institute, a non-partisan environmental think-tank based in California's Bay Area. He was a Member of the Lead Experts Group of the UK Government's Foresight Programme on the Future of Cities. He served as a member of the IPCC for the Second, Third and Fourth Assessment Reports, and was a member of the Royal Commission on Environmental Pollution from 2003–09. Between 2002–08, he directed the ESRC's £5.2 million 'Science in Society' Programme. He was a Fellow of the Royal Anthropological Institute, Royal Society of Arts, American Association for the Advancement of Science, and the Society for Applied Anthropology. His work has been covered by the New York Times, BBC, Economist, New Scientist, Guardian, Nature, Sky News, Globe and Mail and Wired Magazine among others.

== Bibliography ==
- Rayner, Stephen Frank (1979). The Classification and Dynamics of Sectarian Forms of Organisation: Grid/Group Perspectives on the Far-Left in Britain (PDF) (Thesis). University College London.

== See also ==
- Criticism of the Kyoto Protocol
- Adaptation
- Climate engineering (geoengineering)
- Wicked problems
