= Feivel =

Feivel, also Fievel (Yiddish: פֿײַוול), is a Yiddish-language masculine given name. It is a diminutive form of the name Feivish. Notable people with the name include:

- Ezra Feivel Vogel (1930–2020), American sociologist
- Feivel Schiffer (1809–1871), Polish poet and writer
- Yechezkel Feivel (1755–1833), rabbi and writer

== Shraga Feivel ==
- Shraga Feivel Gruberger (1927–2013), American rabbi
- Shraga Feivel Mendlowitz (1886–1948), rabbi
- Shraga Feivel Paretzky (1917–1992), rabbi
- Shraga Feivel Zimmerman (living), rabbi

== Fictional characters ==
- Fievel Mousekewitz from An American Tail, American animated film and franchise

== See also ==
- Fievel Is Glauque, a Belgian-American jazz-pop duo
