= Corey Robin =

American academic (born 1967)

Corey Robin (born 1967) is an American political theorist, journalist and professor of political science at Brooklyn College and the Graduate Center of the City University of New York. He has written books on the role of fear in political life, tracing its presence from Aristotle through the war on terror, and on the nature of conservatism in the modern world, from Edmund Burke to Donald Trump. Most recently, he is the author of a study of Justice Clarence Thomas that argues that the mainspring of Thomas's jurisprudence is a combination of black nationalism and black conservatism.

== Early life and education ==
Raised in a Jewish family in Chappaqua, New York, Robin graduated from Princeton University, majoring in history, and received his Ph.D. in political science from Yale University in 1999.

== Career ==
Robin is the author of the books Fear: The History of a Political Idea, which won the Best First Book in Political Theory Award from the American Political Science Association, and The Reactionary Mind: Conservatism from Edmund Burke to Sarah Palin. Upon publication in 2011, The Reactionary Mind immediately generated tremendous controversy and discussion, including an extended back and forth in the letters page of The New York Review of Books, as well as an article on the controversy in The New York Times. But with the ascent of Donald Trump, the book came to be seen as one of the most prescient analyses of modern American politics, leading The New Yorker, in a lengthy reconsideration of the book, to call it "the book that predicted Trump." A second edition of The Reactionary Mind was published in 2018 with a new subtitle, "From Edmund Burke to Donald Trump", and was received positively.

As interim director at the Graduate Center for Worker Education at Brooklyn College in 2013, Robin was part of the decision-making process to restructure the program. In a Portside essay, Robin urged readers to ignore a petition protesting the elimination of funding. On August 1, 2013, Portside published a statement by Immanuel Ness, editor of WorkingUSA: The Journal of Labor and Society, also of Brooklyn College, countering Robin and urging that the petition be signed. Robin responded to these criticisms, providing a litany of details regarding his opinions about mismanagement and questionable use of the facility.

Robin's book, The Enigma of Clarence Thomas (2019) garnered pre-publication plaudits from Kirkus Reviews and The Atlantic.

While Robin devotes much of his scholarly research to the right, he also writes extensively for newspapers and magazines about a wide variety of issues of concern on the left. In 2018, he wrote a widely noticed essay in The New York Times on the meaning of socialism today, which examines how Bernie Sanders and Alexandria Ocasio-Cortez are remaking a 19th-century tradition for the twenty-first century. He has written widely about the politics of labor and the workplace, and the recovery of freedom for the left. He also writes about intellectuals such as Hannah Arendt, Eric Hobsbawm, Cass Sunstein, and Ta-Nehisi Coates.

Publishers Marketplace reported in March 2023 that Robin was writing a forthcoming work, King Capital, described as "a history of economics and its discontents," to be published by Random House.

His articles have appeared in The New Yorker, Harper's Magazine, The New York Times, The London Review of Books, n+1, the American Political Science Review, Social Research, Jacobin, Politico, and Theory and Event.

== Books ==
- Fear: The History of a Political Idea (2004). New York and London. Oxford University Press. ISBN 0-19-515702-8.
- The Reactionary Mind: Conservatism from Edmund Burke to Sarah Palin (2011). Oxford University Press. ISBN 0-19-979374-3.
- The Reactionary Mind: Conservatism from Edmund Burke to Donald Trump (2017). Oxford University Press. ISBN 978-0190692001, updated version of title above.
- The Enigma of Clarence Thomas (2019). Metropolitan Books. ISBN 9781627793834

== Articles ==
- "The Ex-Cons: Right-Wing Thinkers Go Left!". Lingua Franca (January 2001). pp. 24–33
- "Endgame" (2004). Boston Review (February/March 2004).
- "The Fear of the Liberals". The Nation (September 26, 2005).
- "Strangers in the Land" (2006). The Nation (March 23, 2006).
- "Out of Place" (2008). The Nation (June 4, 2008).
- "Achieving Disunity" London Review of Books (October 25, 2012), 23–25.
- "The Trials of Hannah Arendt " The Nation (June 1, 2015), 12–25.
- "How Intellectuals Create a Public" The Chronicle Review (January 22, 2016), B10-14.
- "Forget About It" Harper’s (April 2018), 5–7.
- "The New Socialists" The New York Times (August 26, 2018), Sunday Review, 1.
- "The Plight of the Political Convert" The New Yorker (January 23, 2019).
- "Eric Hobsbawm, the Communist Who Explained History" The New Yorker (May 9, 2019).
- "Why the Biden Presidency Feels Like Such a Disappointment" The New York Times (Dec 9, 2021).
