= The Reactionary Mind =

2011 book by Corey Robin

- Author: Corey Robin
- Language: English
- Subject: Conservatism, politics
- Publisher: Oxford University Press
- Publication date: 2011
- Publication place: United States
- Media type: Print
- Pages: 304
- ISBN: 0199793743
- OCLC: 848950936
- Dewey Decimal: 305.32 21
- LC Class: JC573 .R63 2011

The Reactionary Mind: Conservatism from Edmund Burke to Sarah Palin is a 2011 book written by political theorist Corey Robin. It argues that conservatism from the 17th century to today is based on the principle "that some are fit, and thus ought, to rule others". Robin argues that rather than being about liberty, limited government, resistance to change, or public virtue, conservatism is a "mode of counterrevolutionary practice" to preserve hierarchy and power.

In 2017, Robin published a second edition titled The Reactionary Mind: Conservatism from Edmund Burke to Donald Trump, updating the book's coverage to include events relating to the 2016 United States presidential election.

== Overview ==
The book begins by defining conservatism as an attempt to preserve hierarchy in the wake of a democratic movement. One example of this 19th-century slogan is given:

To obey a real superior...is one of the most important of all virtues—a virtue absolutely essential to the attainment of anything great and lasting.

Robin goes through the history of conservatism starting with Edmund Burke and argues that traditional definitions of conservatism as an attempt to preserve some kind of tradition are inadequate. He cites passages from Burke and Joseph de Maistre which criticize the old order for being decadent and needing to be recreated. Thomas Hobbes's social contract is given as a conservative solution to a new order which is able to preserve itself under threat.

Robin argues that in the modern era conservatives are often more concerned about preserving power in the private sphere, which finds struggles against causes such as labor movements and feminism.

== Reception ==
The New York Times called it "a diatribe that preaches to the converted" while blogs such as Crooked Timber (a blog Robin contributes to) have defended it. The New Republic gave a lukewarm review, saying that "Robin's arguments deserve widespread attention. But they [sic] way he has presented them almost ensures that they will not get it". Mark Lilla criticized Robin's argument, arguing that Robin's definition of conservatism "can be reduced to this: 'those who react against movements of the left' react against movements of the left – which is a tautology, not an argument" and that one needs to "distinguish between conservatism, which is informed by a view of human nature; reaction, which is informed by a view of history; and the right, which is a shifting, engaged ideological family". Lilla maintains that Robin fails to engage with conservative principles or even accept their existence, instead simply dismissing them as "improvisations" for defending hierarchy and privilege by a vast cast of heterogenous individuals. Gerald Russello argues that progressives have had a questionable record on defending the oppressed, as well as connections to privilege. Russello also argues that Robin's individual chapters make poor arguments, arguing that Ayn Rand is not taken seriously by most conservatives but Robin places great emphasis on her, while Robin also ignores things such as Paul Gottfried's view that neo-conservatism's imperialist arguments were imported from the left-wing rather than conservatism, as well as the fact that Robin ignores conservative critics of the War on Terror and the PATRIOT Act. Russello thus argues that the book lacks nuance and is reduced to an "anguished cry of a Left that cannot understand how any reasonable person could be conservative and so seeks only the darkest motives."

Alex Gourevitch praised Robin for attempting to develop a comprehensive understanding of conservatism and for trying to examine conservative ideas rather than dismissing them outright. He also praised Robin for examining how conservatism can learn from the political left. However, Gourevitch also criticised Robin, arguing that Robin dismissed important differences between different branches of conservatism, as well as similarities between the political left and right, which Gourevitch felt hurt Robin's thesis. He also questioned if conservatives actually intended to defend hierarchies or if these are simply a consequence of conservative ideals, observing examples such as libertarianism, which often results in hierarchies, yet libertarians regard themselves as defending freedom and opposing domination while viewing leftists as introducing their own forms of domination. Jacob Segal praised Robin's effort and research but does not believe Robin succeeds in proving his thesis that conservatism is the defence of privilege from threats from below and that it is not clear that this is the common connection between a vast array of conservative thinkers and individuals.

Lily Geismer, reviewing the second edition of the book which included Robin's thoughts on Donald Trump, praised Robin's efforts to update his arguments and streamline them, as well as his argument that Trump had more in common with conservatism than many commenters thought he did. However, while Geismer argues that Robin offers an intriguing thesis that might be useful for left-wing activists to take note of, she argues that Robin's focus on conservative elites means he largely excludes the perspectives of lower and middle class conservatives. Geismer argues that in doing so Robin ends up reproducing the very elitism he criticises while also undermining his own argument, since he maintains that "the masses" are critical in the restoration of the elite's power yet he largely ignores their views, making it seem as though Robin regards them as simply suffering from false consciousness. Thus discussing their perspectives would, Geismer argues, do a lot more to strengthen his thesis. Geismer also argues that the political left is not sufficiently analysed, as while Robin makes a case for the political right being defined in opposition to the left, he does not make clear what the political left is defined by, leaving the full relationship between the two somewhat unclear. Geismer also argues that since Robin's thesis is that conservatism is at its strongest and most coherent when the political left is strong, this would perhaps suggest that the political left should not be advocating for social justice lest in doing so it galvanise and discipline the right and "awaken a sleeping giant".

The book was also criticized by Sheri Berman, who argues that Robin mischaracterizes right-wing populism, arguing that "taking right-wing populism seriously means accepting that those who support it believe what they say and have agency, rather than viewing them as being used or manipulated in the service of the elites. Robin clearly does not believe these things. He tries to explain his views of populism using a variety of odd and even nonsensical terms". Berman also notes that "[t]he feudal, elitist and hierarchical conservatism that Robin stresses did exist, but it was the conservatism of the ancien régime and it is a tradition conservative thinkers and activists have been slowly abandoning ever since". Berman concludes that "[Robin] repeatedly characterizes conservative leaders and thinkers as manipulative, repressive, 'enlivened' by violence, and committed to the oppression of the 'subordinate classes' or 'lower orders'". Berman argues that Robin does not engage with conservatives characterisation of their own views and instead just dismisses them as a cover for the goal of oppressing others.

Christian Gonzalez, writing for the National Review Online, argued Robin's "theory of conservatism is grounded in an interpretation of violent, revolutionary irruptions as 'emancipatory' and of counterrevolutionary thought and practice as 'oppressive.' Remove that interpretation of history and his thesis collapses." Gonzalez argues that there are reasons to reject this thesis, such as the French and Russian revolutions leading to tyranny, as well as leftist apologia for both the crimes of Stalinism during the 1930s and the dictatorships of the Eastern Bloc during the Cold War. Gonzalez also argued that conservative figures have criticized social injustice and arbitrary hierarchy, such as Edmund Burke's support for abolitionism and the American revolutionaries and criticism of British rule in India, as well as Roger Scruton's support for dissidents in communist Czechoslovakia. Gonzalez did praise Robin's rhetorical ability and argued that he had the ability to challenge the assumptions underlying conservatism but ultimately concluded that his work "functions primarily to confirm old liberal prejudices about conservatives".

The American Conservative's John Derbyshire negatively reviewed the book, accusing Robin of naive utopianism, arguing that Robin "wants to cast down the mighty from their seats of power and exalt the meek and humble. He seems to think that the meek and humble, thus exalted, will conduct themselves with heroic restraint. History offers whole Himalayas of corpses as evidence to the contrary. It is astounding that Robin does not know this". Richard King argues that Robin's conception of conservatism as illegitimate depends upon on the fact that he sees it as opposing his specific conception of what constitutes the social good and that his labelling of conservatives as reactionaries is ultimately self-serving.

John Barlow argues that Robin's view is that conservatism/reaction is the characteristic of those who have power and wish to keep it, along with the satisfaction of having it. Yet Barlow argues that this claim is vulnerable to the fact that "at any given time, yesterday’s victors are today’s conservatives" which Barlow argues is an issue since it makes it difficult to distinguish a characteristically distinct reactionary attitude. Barlow argues that the root of "conservative" is one who wishes to conserve; humans have a tendency to want to keep what they have or have fought or worked for but this is not a new observation, thus Barlow argues that Robin's essays invite a response of "so what?"
