= Feivish =

Feivish, Feivush, Feuvush, Faivish, Faibish, etc. (Yiddish: פייוויש) is a Yiddish-language masculine given name. It has a diminutive form Feivel. It is derived from Greek "Phoebus" Notable people with the name include:

- Arones Faivish (1893–1982), Russian and Israeli theatre actor, director, playwright, and poet
- Dana Faibish, birth name of Dana G. Peleg (born 1969), Israeli writer, translator, journalist and LGBTQI activist
- Meshullam Feivush Heller (1742–1794), Rabbi from Austria-Hungary
- Samuel ben Uri Faivish or Samuel ben Uri Shraga Phoebus (1625 or 1650 – 1706), Polish rabbi
- Shraga Feivish Hager (1958–2024), American rabbi
