= The Hartwell Paper =

The Hartwell Paper called for a reorientation of climate policy after the perceived failure in 2009 of the UNFCCC climate conference in Copenhagen. It was a response to the United Nations' Kyoto Protocol, a previous international agreement meant to reduce greenhouse gas emissions. The paper was published in May 2010 by the London School of Economics in cooperation with the University of Oxford. The authors are 14 natural and social scientists from Asia, Europe and North America, including Mike Hulme, Roger A. Pielke (Jr), Nico Stehr and Steve Rayner, who met under the Chatham House Rule.

The authors saw the 2009 economic crisis as an opportunity to re-evaluate global priorities. They argued that "decarbonisation will only be achieved successfully as a benefit contingent upon other goals which are politically attractive and relentlessly pragmatic."

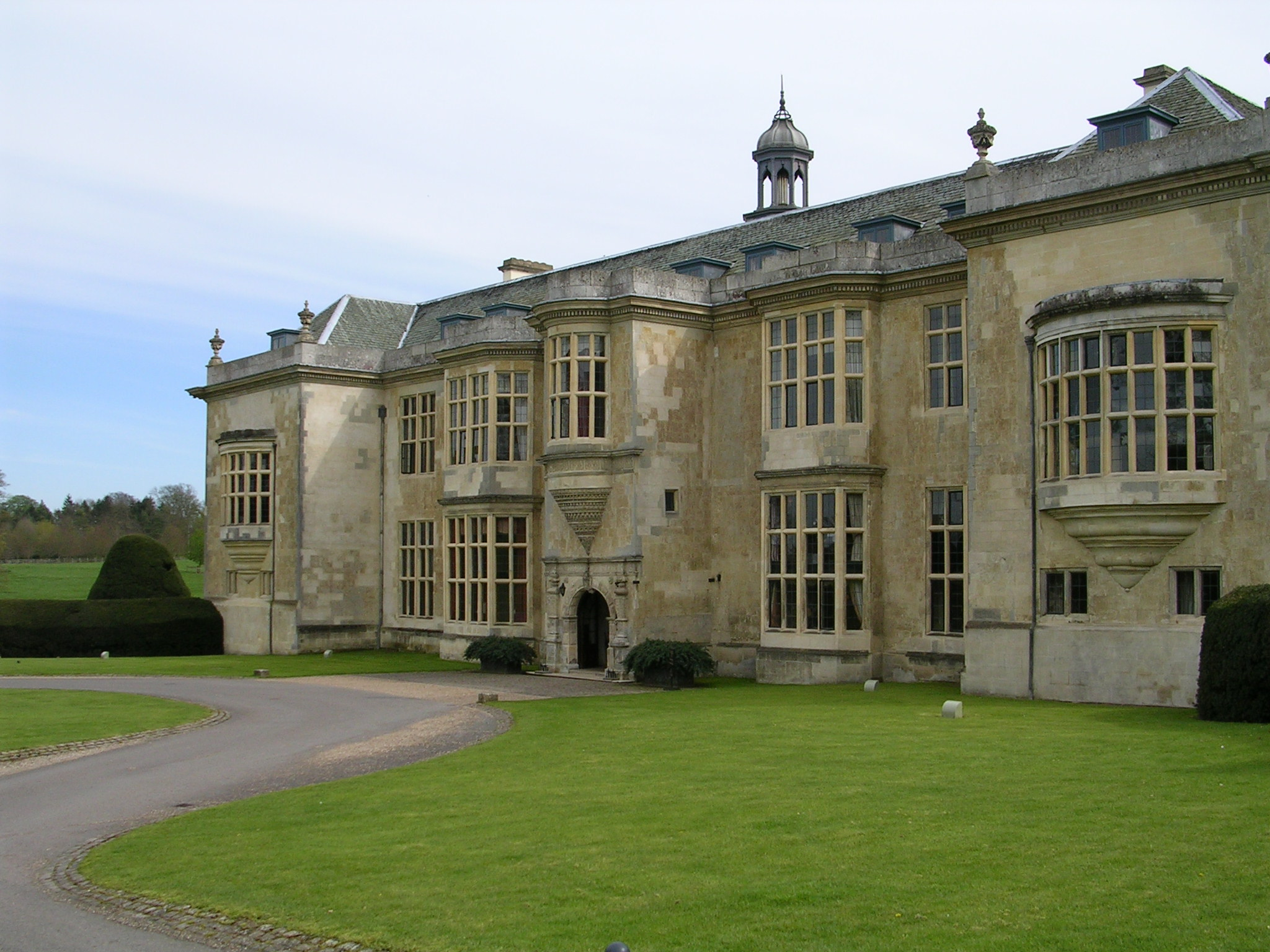
Hartwell House, where the meetings took place.

They emphasize human dignity as a necessary guiding principle for climate policy: "To reframe the climate issue around matters of human dignity is not just noble or necessary. It is also likely to be more effective than the approach of framing around human sinfulness – which has failed and will continue to fail."

This principle of human dignity is expanded to three main objectives:

- 1. Energy access for all – the paper advocates taking investments in the innovations of renewable energy to decrease energy costs and to make them more affordable to society. Only this diversification of energy could extend the access to energy, especially in undeveloped countries.
- 2. Development that does not interfere with essential Earth systems.
- 3. Societies well equipped to withstand climate-related dangers.

Their ultimate goal is "to develop non-carbon energy supplies at unsubsidised costs less than those using fossil fuels."

The Hartwell Paper recommends that they are to achieve this goal by introducing low carbon taxes. However, this money is able to be used to develop a CO_{2} free energy supply.

== Kyoto and Climate Change Misconceptions ==
"The previous 'Kyoto' model has dangerously narrowed the option space for thinking seriously and realistically about energy and environmental policies. The Hartwell Paper wishes to contribute to a new pragmatism in the policy discourse surrounding climate change. To this end, we gathered at Hartwell House in Buckinghamshire in February 2010 and this paper is the base of our work".

The Hartwell Paper argues that, although we should attempt to reduce climate change, we must also prepare to adapt if necessary. According to the authors, the Kyoto principles implied that adaptation to the environment should be seen as a failure to halt climate change. Those at the Hartwell meeting proposed that these strategies; mitigation, and adaptation, should both be employed. This is to keep in mind the dignity of those who would be most affected while simultaneously slowing global warming.

The following are climate myths presented in the paper:

- Climate change is a problem that must be solved – "Rather than being a discrete problem to be solved. Climate change is better understood as a persistent condition that must be coped with and can only be partially managed more – or less – well. It is just one part of a larger complex of such conditions encompassing population, technology, wealth disparities, resource use, etc."
- The "deficit model" of science – The idea that the lack of information hinders the making of environmental progress. Once the science is understood by all, an agreement can be reached. The Hartwell authors call this a myth, saying that it doesn't address the varying political and religious ideologies that can result in differing interpretations of scientific data. "In turn, this error has led to the common and flawed assumption that the solutions to climate change should be 'science driven' as if a shared understanding of science will lead to a political consensus."

== Key Features of Hartwell Plan ==
The authors propose a holistic model of environmental practice. They believe there has been too much emphasis placed on carbon dioxide as if it is our only problematic emission. They state that while the CO_{2} reduction is central to the plan, smaller changes in a variety of practices and industries are also important.

- Diversification and moving away from fossil fuels
- Eradication of "Black Carbon" – Black Carbon is simply soot, which can come from burning wood or coal within the home. This has an environmental effect far greater (per ton) than simple CO_{2}. According to the authors, this is an important step to take, as it should be much easier than phasing out gasoline.
- Reduce Tropospheric Ozone
- Protect Tropical Forests
- The "Kaya Identity" – these are four primary factors when it comes to a region's environmental footprint. They are population, wealth, energy intensity, and carbon intensity. Nations face different environmental issues, and the solution for one is not the solution for all.

== Reception and Criticism ==
The Hartwell Paper has received both praise and criticism. According to The Economist, the Hartwell approach to decarbonisation has been a source of controversy. Because large, rapidly industrializing nations are driven by fossil fuels, the authors claim that slowing this process just isn't politically feasible. The Economist article argues that Hartwell's "oblique strategies" may be more difficult to turn into policy than a more direct attack on carbon dioxide emissions.

== See also ==
- Hartwell House, Buckinghamshire
- Kyoto Protocol
- 2009 United Nations Climate Change Conference
