= David Keen =

British economist and educator (born 1958)

David Keen (born 21 September 1958) is a British political economist and Professor of Complex Emergencies at the London School of Economics, where he has worked since the 1990s. He was educated at Cambridge and Oxford in economics and anthropology, and was formerly a consultant for NGOs and development agencies, and a journalist.

== Contributions ==
Keen is a theorist of contemporary conflict, notably in African society. He has done fieldwork in Sudan, Sierra Leone, Serbia, Syria/Turkey border areas, Sri Lanka, France and Iraq, among US war veterans, and archival research.

In Endless War and in several articles he has argued that "winning war is rarely an end in itself; rather, war tends to be part of a wider political and economic game that is consistent with strengthening the enemy". The "war on terror" is, for Keen, an extension of the Cold War.

The Benefits of Famine explored how the 1980s famines in Sudan were of use to certain groups. Famines have powerful beneficiaries including political elites and traders. International intervention "may offer significant political and bureaucratic benefits for international donors".

Three books published in 2023, with certain linked themes, are designed for an informed public as well as scholarly readers. In When Disasters Come Home he explores the growing threats to Western society of distant and global disasters. Shame explores the function of modern shaming, paying particular attention to how it is instrumentalized and weaponized. The Guardian found it a "fascinating, occasionally frustrating book" given the power of social media to shame is not addressed at all. Wreckonomics argues that incentive systems allow destructive policies to flourish in the face of systemic failure.

== Major works ==
- Andersson, R. & Keen, D. 2023. Wreckonomics: Why It's Time to End the War on Everything. Oxford University Press.
- Keen, D. 2023. When Disasters Come Home: Making and Manipulating Emergencies In The West. Polity.
- Keen, D. 2023. Shame: the politics and power of an emotion. Princeton University Press.
- Keen, D. 2012. Useful Enemies: When Waging Wars is More Important Than Winning Them. Yale University Press.
- Keen, D. 2007. Complex Emergencies. Bristol: Polity.
- Keen, D. 2006. Endless War? Hidden Functions of the 'War on Terror'. Pluto Press.
- Keen, D. 2005. Conflict and Collusion in Sierra Leone. James Currey/Palgrave.
- Keen, D. 1998. The Economic Functions of Violence in Civil Wars. Adelphi Adelphi Papers, No 320. Routledge.
- Keen, D. 1999. Geopolitics of Hunger, 1998-1999. Action against Hunger/Presses Universitaires de France.
- Keen, D. 1994. The Benefits of Famine. A Political Economy of Famine and Relief in Southwestern Sudan, 1983-1989. Princeton University Press.
- Keen, D. 1994. Famine, Needs Assessment, and Survival Strategies in Africa. Oxfam Research Papers. Oxford: Oxfam.
- Keen, D. 1993. The Kurds in Iraq: How Safe Is Their Haven Now? London: Save the Children.
- Keen, D. 1992. Refugees: Rationing the Right To Life: The Crisis in Emergency Relief. London: Zed.
- Keen, D. 1987. Refugees: The Dynamics of Displacement. A Report for the Independent Commission on International Humanitarian Issues. London: Zed.

Report

- Keen, D., Attree, H. & Saferworld staff. 2015. Dilemmas of Counter-Terror, Stabilisation and Statebuilding. London: Saferworld.
