= Susan Visvanathan =

Indian sociologist and writer

Susan Visvanathan (born 1957) is an Indian sociologist, social anthropologist and a fiction writer. She is well known for her writings on religious dialogue and sociology of religion. Her first book Christians of Kerala: History, Belief and Ritual among the Yakoba (Oxford University Press) is a pathbreaking work in the field of sociology of religion.

She was a professor of Sociology and former chairperson at Centre for the Study of Social Systems at the Jawaharlal Nehru University (JNU).

== Early life and background ==
Susan Visvanathan studied in Delhi University and Jawaharlal Nehru University. After finishing her M.A in sociology from Jawaharlal Nehru University, she earned her M.Phil. and PhD in sociology from the Department of Sociology, Delhi School of Economics, University of Delhi. Susan completed her MPhil and PhD under the supervision of the eminent Sociologist and Social Anthropologist, Veena Das.

== Career ==
Susan started her career as senior lecturer in sociology, Hindu College, University of Delhi in 1983. She was head of the Department of Sociology in Hindu College from 1989 to 1997. She joined the Centre for the Study of Social Systems, Jawaharlal Nehru University (JNU) in 1997, from where she retired as a professor of sociology in 2022. At JNU, she taught courses in Sociology of Religion, Historical Anthropology, Classical Social Theory and gender studies. She was chairperson of the Centre for the Study of Social Systems, School of Social Sciences, Jawaharlal Nehru University from 2010 to 2012.

She also writes fiction during winter and summer breaks from the university, extending sociological and theoretical concerns in the more vivid prose of literary fiction including short stories and novels.

== Books ==
- The Christians of Kerala: History, Belief and Ritual among the Yakoba (Oxford University Press, 1993. Reprinted 7th time as paperback from OUP Delhi in 2010)
- Missionary Styles and the Problem of Dialogue (Indian Institute of Advanced Study, Shimla, 1993).
- An Ethnography of Mysticism: The Journeys of a French Monk in India (Indian Institute of Advanced Study, Shimla 1998).
- Structure and Transformation: Theory and Society in India (Oxford University Press. Delhi, 2000).
- Friendship, Interiority and Mysticism: Essays in Dialogue (Orient Longman/ Orient BlackSwan, 2007).
- Children of Nature: The Life and Legacy of Ramana Maharshi (Roli Books, 2010).
- Reading Marx, Weber and Durkheim Today (Palm Leaf Publications,2012).
- Culture and Society (Readings in Indian sociology, Vol. IX), (Sage, 2014).
- Art, Politics, Symbols and Religion: A Reader for Humanities and Design (Winshield Press, 2019).
- Structure, Innovation and Adaptation: Concepts and Empirical Puzzles in a Postmodern Milieu (Winshield, 2019).
- Chronology and Events: The Sociological Landscape of Changing Concepts (Winshield, 2019).
- Wisdom of Community: Essays on History, Social Transformation and Culture ( Bloomsbury, 2022).
- Work, Word and the World: Essays on Habitat, Culture and Environment ( Bloomsbury, 2022).

== Fiction ==
- Something Barely Remembered (Flamingo 2000 and Roli IndiaInk, 2000)
- The Visiting Moon (Roli IndiaInk 2002)
- Phosphorus and Stone (Penguin and Zubaan, 2007)
- The Seine at Noon (Roli IndiaInk, 2007)
- Nelycinda and Other Stories (Roli Books,2012)
- Adi Sankara and Other Stories (Papyrus Scrolls, 2017)

== Selected Articles (Journals) ==
- Reconstructions of the Past Among the Syrian Christians of Kerala, Contributions to Indian Sociology (Sage), July 1986
- Marriage, Birth and Death: Property Rights and Domestic Relationships of the Orthodox/Jacobite Syrian Christians of Kerala, Economic and Political Weekly, Vol. XXIV No. 24, 17 June 1989
- Women and Work – From Housewifization to Androgyny, Economic and Political Weekly, Vol. XXXI Nos 45 and 46 November 9–16, 1996.
- The Homogeneity of Fundamentalism: British Colonialism and Mission in India in the 19th Century, Studies in History(Sage),16 (2)2000
- S.K. Rudra, C.F Andrews and M.K. Gandhi: Friendship, Dialogue and Interiority in the Question of Indian Nationalism, Economic and Political Weekly, Vol XXXVII, No. 34, 24 August 2002
- Medieval Music and Shakespeare's Sonnets, Think India Quarterly,12(2), 2009
- Visvanathan, Susan (April 2001). "Hannah Arendt and the Problem of Our Age". Economic and Political Weekly. 36 (16): 1307–1309. JSTOR 4410510.

== Selected Articles (Edited Books) ==
- "Interpretations of the City", in 'Structure and Transformation: Theory and Society in India', edited by Susan Visvanathan, New Delhi: Oxford University Press, 2001
- "The Eucharist in a Syrian Christian Church", in 'India's Religions:Perspectives from Sociology and History', edited by T.N Madan, New Delhi: Oxford University Press, 2004
- "Ringeltaube in the Midst of the Natives-1813 and the Narratives of Distress", in 'Halle and the beginning of Protestant Christianity in India : Vol 2- Christian mission in the Indian context', edited by Andreas Gross et al., Halle: Franckesche Stiftungen, 2006
- "Reconstructions of the Past", in 'Historical Anthropology', edited by Saurabh Dube, New Delhi: Oxford University Press, 2007
- "The Status of Christian Women in Kerala", in 'World Christianity:Critical Concepts in Religious Studies', edited by Elizabeth Koepping, London:Routledge,2010
- "A Cast of Characters," in 'Remembered Childhood:Essays in Honour of Andre Beteille', edited by Malvika Karlekar, New Delhi: Oxford University Press,2010

== Bruce King on Susan Visvanathan's Fiction Writing ==
Literary Critic Bruce King's book Rewriting India:Eight Authors (Oxford University Press, 2014), has a chapter on the literary and fictional writings of Susan Visvanathan. He writes,"Susan Visvanathan's fiction is purposefully anti-autobiographical and is based on her sociological studies, stories she has been told, other fiction, and what she imagined during her travels. Refraining from formulae of consciously Indian literature, her fiction avoids predictability; and that is part of its message, that life is an unpredictable process of change". King writes,"The unpredictable quality and structure of Visvanathan's fiction, even its fluctuating tone, is in keeping with her vision and can be attractive. She is an interesting writer".
