= Nico Stehr =

German sociologists and author

Nico Stehr (born 19 March 1942) was "Karl Mannheim Professor for Cultural Studies" at the Zeppelin University in Friedrichshafen / Germany and Founding Director of the European Center for Sustainability Research.

== Biography ==
Nico Stehr received a PhD in sociology from the University of Oregon in 1970. Between 1967 and 2000, he taught at American and Canadian universities. His last appointment in Canada was that of fellow in Peter Wall Institute for Advanced Study der University of British Columbia in Vancouver, Canada. During the academic year 2002-2003 he was Paul-Lazarsfeld-Professor (a visiting appointment) at the University of Vienna. He is Senior Research Fellow of the Sustainable Development Research Institute, University of British Columbia, Vancouver, British Columbia, a fellow of the Fellow the Center for Advanved Study of the Humanities, Essen, Germany, editor of the Canadian Journal of Sociology (until 2006), a Fellow of the Royal Society (Canada) and the European Academy of the Sciences and the Arts.

In 2011, Nico Stehr created the European Center for Sustainability Research (ECS) at Zeppelin University.

His research interests center on the transformation of modern societies into knowledge societies and associated developments in different social institutions of modern society (e.g. science, politics, and the economy) and is focused on these field of attention:

Knowledge: Knowledge is not merely a model of reality but a model for reality. Knowledge represents a capacity to act.

Knowledge and information: The substance of information primarily concerns the properties of products or outcomes while the stuff of knowledge refers to the qualities of process or inputs.

Post-industrial society: Innovation are increasingly derivative from research and development; there is a new relation between science and technology because of the centrality of theoretical knowledge, and the weight of the society—measured by a larger proportion of Gross National Product and a larger share of employment—is increasingly shifting toward the knowledge field.

Knowledge society: The foundation for the transformation of modern societies into knowledge societies is based on changes in the structure of the economies of advanced societies. The source of economic growth and value-adding activities—increasingly relies on knowledge. The significance of knowledge grows in all spheres of life and in all social institutions of modern society.

Common sense and scientific knowledge: The growing significance of science and its manifold social utility has led to its having a virtual monopoly on the production of new socially, economically and politically relevant knowledge in modern societies; knowledge that rarely can be contested by religion, nor by politics, and in particular not by daily experience. But this does not mean that ordinary citizens are now the slaves of scientific experts.

Stehr is one of the authors of the Hartwell Paper: A new direction for climate policy after the crash of 2009. The Hartwell Paper arises from a meeting convened by Professor Gwyn Prins of the LSE in February 2010 to consider the implications of developments in climate policy in late 2009.

Climate policy, as it has been understood and practised by many governments of the world under the Kyoto Protocol approach, has failed to produce any discernible real world reductions in emissions of greenhouse gases in fifteen years. The underlying reason for this is that the UNFCCC/Kyoto model was structurally flawed and doomed to fail because it systematically misunderstood the nature of climate change as a policy issue between 1985 and 2009. However, the currently dominant approach has acquired immense political momentum because of the quantities of political capital sunk into it. But in any case the UNFCCC/Kyoto model of climate policy cannot continue because it crashed in late 2009. The Hartwell Paper sets and reviews this context; but doing so is not its sole or primary purpose.

The Paper proposes that the organising principle of our effort should be the raising up of human dignity via three overarching objectives: ensuring energy access for all; ensuring that we develop in a manner that does not undermine the essential functioning of the Earth system; ensuring that our societies are adequately equipped to withstand the risks and dangers that come from all the vagaries of climate, whatever their cause may be. It explains radical and practical ways to reduce non-CO_{2} human forcing of climate. It argues that improved climate risk management is a valid policy goal, and is not simply congruent with carbon policy. It explains the political prerequisite of energy efficiency strategies as a first step and documents how this can achieve real emissions reductions. But, above all, it emphasises the primacy of accelerating decarbonisation of energysupply. This calls for very substantially increased investment in innovation in noncarbon energy sources in order to diversify energy supply technologies. The ultimate goal of doing this is to develop non-carbon energy supplies at unsubsidised costs less than those using fossil fuels. The Hartwell Paper advocates funding this work by low hypothecated (dedicated) carbon taxes. It opens discussion on how to channel such money productively.

== Research topics ==
The Power of Scientific Knowledge: From Research to Public Policy (with Reiner Grundmann) The Power of Scientific Knowledge . From Research to Public Policy. (Cambridge University Press, 2012); ISBN 978-1-107-02272-0

− COPYRIGHT Nico Stehr and Reiner Grundmann

It is often said that knowledge is power, but more often than not relevant knowledge is not used when political decisions are made. This book examines how political decisions relate to scientific knowledge and what factors determine the success of scientific research in influencing policy. The authors take a comparative and historical perspective and refer to well-known theoretical frameworks, but the focus of the book is on three case studies: the discourse of racism, Keynesianism and climate change. These cases cover a number of countries and different time periods. In all three the authors see a close link between 'knowledge producers' and political decision-makers, but show that the effectiveness of the policies varies dramatically. This book will be of interest to scientists, decision-makers and scholars alike.

== Books ==
- (with Volker Meja und David Kettler) Karl Mannheim (Tavistock, 1984); ISBN 978-0-85312-688-1
- Praktische Erkenntnis (Suhrkamp, 1991); ISBN 3-518-58099-X
- Practical Knowledge. Applying Social Science Knowledge (Sage, 1992); ISBN 0-8039-8699-8
- Knowledge Societies (Sage, 1994); ISBN 0-8039-7892-8
- Arbeit, Eigentum und Wissen: Zur Theorie von Wissensgesellschaften (Suhrkamp, 1994); ISBN 3-518-58187-2
- (with Hans von Storch) Klima-Wetter-Mensch (C.H. Beck, 1999); ISBN 3-406-44613-2
- Die Zerbrechlichkeit moderner Gesellschaften. Die Grenzen der Macht und die Chancen des Individuums (Velbrück Wissenschaft, 2000); ISBN 3-934730-18-3
- Wissen und Wirtschaften: Die gesellschaftlichen Grundlagen der modernen Ökonomie (Suhrkamp, 2001); ISBN 3-518-29107-6
- The Fragility of Modern Societies: Knowledge and Risk in the Information Age (Sage, 2001); ISBN 978-0-7619-5348-7
- Knowledge and Economic Conduct. The Social Foundations of the Modern Economy (University of Toronto Press, 2002); ISBN 0-8020-0905-0
- Wissenspolitik: Die Überwachung des Wissens (Suhrkamp Verlag, 2003); ISBN 3-518-29215-3
- Knowledge Politics: Governing the Consequences of Science and Technology (Paradigm Books, 2005); ISBN 1-59451-086-5
- Die Moralisierung der Märkte (Suhrkamp, 2007); ISBN 0-7658-0295-3
- Moral Markets. How Knowledge and Affluence Change Consumers and Producers (Paradigm Publishers, 2008); ISBN 978-1-59451-456-2
- (with Reiner Grundmann) Expertenwissen . Die Kultur und die Macht von Experten, Beratern und Ratgebern (Velbrück Wissenschaft, 2010). ISBN 978-3938808-82-5
- (with Hans von Storch) Climate and Society . Climate as Resource, Climate as Risk. (World Scientific, 2010); ISBN 978-981-4280-53-2
- (with Hans von Storch) Klima Wetter Mensch . (Budrich Verlag, 2010); ISBN 978-3-86649-228-8
- (with Reiner Grundmann) Die Macht der Erkenntnis . (Suhrkamp, 2011); ISBN 978-3518295908
- (with Reiner Grundmann) Experts . The knowledge and power of expertise. (Routledge, 2011); ISBN 978-0415608039.
- (with Reiner Grundmann) The Power of Scientific Knowledge . From Research to Public Policy. (Cambridge University Press, 2012); ISBN 978-1-107-02272-0
- (with Marian Adolf) "Knowledge". (Routledge, 2014); ISBN 978-1138014497
- (with Marian Adolf) "Ist Wissen Macht? Erkenntnisse über Wissen" (Velbrueck, 2015); ISBN 9783958320741
- "Die Freiheit ist eine Tochter des Wissens". (Springer VS, 2015); ISBN 978-3658095192
- " Information, Power, and Democracy. Liberty is a Daughter of Knowledge" (Cambridge University Press, 2016); ISBN 9781107120754
- (with Amanda Machin) " Understanding Inequality: Social Costs and Benefits" (Springe VS, 2016); ISBN 9783658116620
- (with Marian Adolf) "Knowledge. Is Knowledge Power?" Second Edition (Routledge, 2017); ISBN 978-1-138-685680
- (with Amanda Machin) "Gesellschaft und Klima. Entwicklungen, Umbrueche, Herausforderungn" (Velbrueck Wissenschaft, 2919); ISBN 978-3-95832-167-0
- (with Dustin Voss) "Money. A Theory of Modern Society" (Routledge, 2020); ISBN 978-0-367-35465-7
- Knowledge capitalism, NY: Routledge, 2022. ISBN 978-1-032-28291-6

=== Edited ===
- (ed. with René Kõnig) Wissenschaftssoziologie. Studien und Matrialien. Sonderheft 18 der Kölner Zeitschrift für Soziologie und Sozialpsychlogie (Westdeutscher Verlag, 1975); ISBN 3-531-11326-7
- (ed. with Volker Meja und David Kettler) Karl Mannheim, Strukturen des Denkens (Suhrkamp, 1981; second edition 2003) ISBN 978-0-85312-688-1
- (ed. with Volker Meja und David Kettler) Karl Mannheim: Structures of Thought (Routledge and Kegan Paul, 1982);
- (ed. with Volker Meja) Streit um die Wissenssoziologie (Suhrkamp, 1982); ISBN 978-3-518-27961-8
- (ed. with Volker Meja und David Kettler) Karl Mannheim, Konservativismus (Suhrkamp, 1984; second edition 2003); ISBN 978-3-518-28078-2
- (ed. with Volker Meja) Knowledge and Society: Contemporary Perspectives on the Sociology of Knowledge (Transaction Books, 1984); ISBN 0-87855-493-9
- (ed. with Gernot Bõhme) Knowledge Society (D. Reidel Publishing, 1986); ISBN 978-90-277-2305-5
- (ed. with Richard V. Ericson) The Culture and Power of Knowledge. Inquiries into Contemporary Societies (de Gruyter, 1992); ISBN 3-11-013175-7
- (ed. with Volker Meja) The Sociology of Knowledge International Library of Sociology (Elgar, 1999); ISBN 1-85898-588-9
- (ed. with Richard V. Ericson) Governing Modern Societies (University of Toronto Press, 2000); ISBN 0-8020-4392-5
- (ed. with Peter Weingart) Practising Interdisciplinarity (University of Toronto Press, 2000); ISBN 0-8020-4328-3
- (ed. with Reiner Grundmann) Werner Sombart, Economic Life in the Modern Age (Transaction Publishers, 2001); ISBN 0-7658-0030-6
- (ed.) The Governance of Knowledge (Transaction Publishers, 2004); ISBN 0-7658-0172-8
- (ed.) Biotechnology: Between Commerce and Civil Society (Transaction Publishers, 2004); ISBN 0-7658-0224-4
- (ed. with Christian Fleck) Die Gesellschaft des Terrors: Innansichten der KZs Dachau und Buchenwald (Suhrkamp, 2004); ISBN 978-3-518-58397-5
- (ed. with Reiner Grundmann), Knowledge. Five Volumes (Routledge, 2005); ISBN 0-415-35341-6
- (ed. with Stephan A. Jansen and Birger P. Priddat) Die Zukunft des Oeffentlichen. Multipliziplinaere Perspektiven für eine Öffnung der Diskussion über das Öffentliche (VS Verlag für Sozialwissenschaften, 2007); ISBN 978-3-531-15282-0
- (ed. with Christian Fleck) Paul F. Lazarsfeld: Empirische Theorie des Handelns (Suhrkamp, 2007); ISBN 978-3-518-29422-2
- (ed. with Voker Meja) Society and Knowledge. Contemporary Perspectives on the Sociology of Knowledge and Science (Transaction Publishers, 2005)
- (ed. with Bernd Weiler) Who owns Knowledge? Knowledge and the Law (Transaction Publishers, 2008). ISBN 978-0-7658-0337-5
- (ed.) Knowledge and Democracy (Transaction Publishers, 2008). ISBN 978-1-4128-0706-7
- (ed. with Reiner Grundmann) Society Critical Concepts in Sociology. Four Volumes (Routledge, 2008); ISBN 978-0-415-42656-5
- (ed. with Stephan Jansen and Eckard Schroeter) Mehrwertiger Kapitalismus. Multidisziplinaere Beitraege zu Formen des Kapitalismus und seiner Kapitalien (VS-Verlag fuer Sozialwissenschaften, 2008); ISBN 978-3-531-15864-8
- (ed. with Hans von Storch) Eduard Brückner: Die Geschichte unseres Klimas: Klimaschwankungen und Klimafolgen (Österreichische Beiträge zu Meteorologie und Geophysik, 2008).
- (ed. with Stephan Jansen and Eckard Schroeter) Rationalität der Kreativität. Multidisziplinäre Beiträge zur Analyse der Produktion, Organisation und Bildung von Kreativität. (VS Verlag für Sozialwissenschaften, 2009); ISBN 978-3-531-16688-9
- (ed. with Gotthard Bechmann and Vitaly Gorekhov) The Social Integration of Science. Institutional and Epistemological Aspects of the Transformation of Knowledge in Modern Society. (Edition Sigma, 2009); ISBN 978-3-89404-942-3
- (ed. with Stephan A. Jansen und Eckard Schröter) Positive Distanz . Multidisziplinäre Annäherungen and den wahren Abstand und das Abstandwahren in Theorie und Praxis. (Springer VS, 2012). ISBN 978-3531-19207-9.
- (ed. with Stephan A. Jansen und Eckard Schröter) Bürger. Macht. Staat? Neue Formen Gesellschaftlicher Teilhabe, Teilnahme und Arbeitsteilung. (Springer VS, 2012). ISBN 978-3531-19346-5.
- (ed. with Stephan Jansen and Eckhard Schroeter) Fragile Stabilitaet - stabile Fragilität. (Springer VS, 2013); ISBN 978-3-658-02247-1
- (ed.) "Das Hartwell-Papier: Eine Neuausrichtung der Klimapolitik an der Menschenwürde (German Edition)." (Springer VS, 2014). ISBN 978-3658074593
- (ed.) "Der zündende Funke: Innovationen fördern als Weg zu sauberer und bezahlbarer Energie für alle (German Edition)." (Springer VS, 2014) ISBN 978-3658075477

== See also ==
- The Hartwell Paper
