= Frank Jacob (historian) =

German historian (b. 1984)

Frank Jacob (born 8 August 1984 in Schmalkalden, Germany) is a German historian and japanologist.

== Life ==
Jacob studied history and Japanese studies at the universities of Würzburg (Julius-Maximilians-Universität Würzburg) and Osaka (Osaka University). In 2012 he received his PhD in Japanese Studies from the Friedrich-Alexander-Universität Erlangen-Nürnberg.

After teaching at Heinrich-Heine-University Düsseldorf and Friedrich-Alexander-Universität Erlangen-Nürnberg he was Assistant (Chair of Prof. Wolfgang Altgeld) at the Historical Institute of Julius-Maximilians-Universität Würzburg. Between 2014 and 2018 he held a tenure track position at the City University of New York, where he taught World History at Queensborough Community College, and served as the CUNY Academy's Officer for Internationalization and Global Exchange. In 2016 he received the CUNY Academy's Henry Wasser Award for Outstanding Research.

In 2018, Jacob was offered a tenured full professorship at Nord University, Norway, where he is currently teaching Global History.

Jacob is editor of numerous journals and series, including Global Military Studies Review (co-ed. with James Horncastle, open access, published by Simon Fraser UP), War (Hi)Stories (Schöningh), and Genocide and Mass Violence in the Age of Extremes (De Gruyter). His main research fields include Modern Japanese History, Military History, and Transnational Anarchism. Moreover, Jacob is the curator of the works of Kurt Eisner, whose legacy is published with the support of the Rosa Luxemburg Foundation.

== Publications (selection) ==
Monographs

2010: Die Thule-Gesellschaft, uni-edition, Berlin.

2013: Die Thule-Gesellschaft und die Kokuryûkai, Königshausen & Neumann, Würzburg.

2014: Japanism, Pan-Asianism, Terrorism – A Short History of the Amur Society (Black Dragons) 1901–1945, Academica Press, Palo Alto.

2015: Geheimgesellschaften, Kohlhammer Verlag, Stuttgart.

2016: The Military Revolution in Early Modern Europe: A Revision, co-authored with Gilmar Visoni-Alonzo, Palgrave, London.

2017: Tsushima 1905: Ostasiens Trafalgar, Ferdinand Schöningh, Paderborn.

2018: The Russo-Japanese War and its Shaping of the 20th Century, Routledge, London and New York.

2018: Gallipoli 1915/16: Britanniens bitterste Niederlage, Schöningh, Paderborn.

2018: George Kennan on the Spanish American War: A Critical Edition of "Cuba and the Cubans", Palgrave, London.

2018: Japanese War Crimes during World War II: Atrocity and the Psychology of Collective Violence, Praeger, Santa Barbara.

Edited Volumes

2013: Secret Societies: Comparative Studies in Culture, Society and History, Comparative Studies from a Global Perspective Vol. 1, Königshausen & Neumann, Würzburg.

2014: Peripheries of the Cold War, Comparative Studies from a Global Perspective Vol. 3, Königshausen & Neumann, Würzburg.

2015: Tabak und Gesellschaft: Vom braunen Gold zum sozialen Stigma, Nomos, Baden-Baden, hrsg. mit G. Dworok.

2016: Prostitution – A Companion of Mankind, Peter Lang Verlag, Frankfurt am Main u. a.

2016: Kurt Eisner: Gefängnistagebuch, Metropol Verlag, Berlin.

2017: War and Geography: The Spatiality of Organized Mass Violence, Ferdinand Schöningh, Paderborn. co-ed. with S. Danielson.

2018: Migration and the Crisis of the Modern Nation State? Vernon Press, Wilmington, DE. co-edited with Adam Luedtke.
