= Keith Oatley =

Anglo-Canadian novelist (born 1939)

Keith Oatley FRSC, FBPsS (16 March 1939) is an Anglo-Canadian novelist, and professor emeritus of cognitive psychology at the University of Toronto. His novel The Case of Emily V won the 1994 Commonwealth Prize for first novel.

He is known for his work on the psychology of emotions, the cognitive science of fiction, and the intersection of psychology and literature. Oatley is a Fellow of the Royal Society of Canada, the British Psychological Society, and the Association for Psychological Science.

== Life and education ==
Oatley was born in London, England. As an undergraduate at the University of Cambridge he studied Natural Sciences, and then Experimental Psychology.

Initially pursuing medicine, he shifted to psychology, earning a Ph.D. from University College London. He later completed postdoctoral research in Engineering in Medicine at Imperial College London. He is married to Professor Jennifer Jenkins, He has two sons who live in England, and a daughter who lives in Canada.

== Academic career ==
Oatley began his career at the UK's National Physical Laboratory in the Autonomics Division before taking an academic post as Lecturer in the Laboratory of Experimental Psychology at the University of Sussex.

During his tenure at Sussex, he also held visiting appointments at the University of Chicago’s Committee on Mathematical Biology and at the University of Toronto.

He subsequently served as Professor of Cognitive Psychology at the University of Glasgow before joining the University of Toronto in 1990, where he held the position of Professor of Applied Cognitive Psychology in the Department of Human Development and Applied Psychology. He served as department chair from 1999 to 2002 and held cross-appointments in the Department of Psychology and the Cognitive Science Program at University College.

Oatley has conducted research across a wide range of disciplines including physiological psychology, visual perception, artificial intelligence, human-computer interaction, and epidemiological psychiatry. His later work focused on emotional disorders such as depression and the psychology of fiction. He served as president of the International Society for Research on Emotions.

== Research ==
Oatley's research primarily explores human emotions and the psychological impact of fiction. He is the originator and co-author of the widely used textbook Understanding Emotions, now in its fourth edition. His work delves into how fictional narratives can enhance empathy and social understanding, proposing that engaging with fiction allows individuals to simulate social experiences, thereby improving emotional intelligence.

=== Fiction as Simulation ===
Central to Oatley’s theory is the analogy of fiction as a kind of flight simulator for social interaction. Just as flight simulators train pilots by immersing them in realistic scenarios without real-world consequences, stories immerse readers in emotionally and morally complex situations, helping them learn about the minds of others.

Functional MRI studies support this view, revealing that readers engage sensorimotor brain areas when imagining characters' actions such as grasping a doorknob suggesting embodied cognitive engagement.

=== Beyond Short-Term Priming ===
Critics of this research note that many experiments measure only short-term effects temporary increases in empathy or cooperation that may fade quickly. Oatley acknowledges these limitations but maintains that repeated, meaningful engagement with fiction likely contributes to deeper, more lasting changes in personality and social cognition.

Indeed, he argues that literature’s role should not be dismissed because it lacks the precision of laboratory science. Instead, psychologists could study fiction the way they study perceptual illusions: as designed experiences that reveal underlying mechanisms of mind and emotion.

=== Literature and Moral Psychology ===
Oatley further suggests that fiction could enhance the study of moral reasoning.

While modern experimental psychology has relied heavily on stylized vignettes such as the well-known "trolley problem".

Oatley proposes that narrative art offers richer, more psychologically realistic moral dilemmas. He points to the films of Krzysztof Kieślowski, such as The Decalogue, as powerful examples. In these stories, viewers are drawn into characters' inner conflicts and must grapple with overlapping values, obligations, and consequences.

In one such film (Decalogue II), a woman faces a life-altering decision about whether to have an abortion, based on whether her terminally ill husband will live or die. The story raises moral and emotional questions that static vignettes cannot match. For Oatley, these narratives illustrate how fiction fosters not just empathy but moral imagination—the ability to think deeply about others’ perspectives, emotions, and motivations.

== Literary Works ==
In addition to his academic publications, Oatley has authored several novels that intertwine psychological themes with narrative storytelling. His debut novel, The Case of Emily V., imagines a collaboration between Sigmund Freud and Sherlock Holmes as they tackle the same case in 1904. This work received the Commonwealth Writers Prize for Best First Novel in 1994. He has also written A Natural History and Therefore Choose, both of which continue to explore complex psychological and emotional landscapes.

== Works ==
- The Case of Emily V. Secker & Warburg. 1993. ISBN 978-0-436-32602-8.; Keith Oatley, 2007, ISBN 978-1-929355-30-3
- A natural history: a novel, Viking, 1998, ISBN 978-0-670-88167-3
- Therefore Choose, Goose Lane Editions, 2010, ISBN 978-0-86492-616-6

=== Non-fiction ===
- Brain mechanisms and mind, Dutton, 1972
- Perceptions and representations Methuen, 1978, ISBN 978-0-416-86010-8
- Selves in relation, Methuen, 1984, ISBN 978-0-416-33630-6
- Emotions: A Brief History. Wiley-Blackwell. 2004. ISBN 978-1-4051-1315-1.
- Best laid schemes: the psychology of emotions. Cambridge University Press. 1992. ISBN 978-0-521-42387-8.
- Keith Oatley; Dacher Keltner; Jennifer M. Jenkins (2006). Understanding emotions. Wiley-Blackwell. ISBN 978-1-4051-3103-2.
- Jennifer M. Jenkins; Keith Oatley; Nancy L. Stein, eds. (1998). Human emotions: a reader. Wiley-Blackwell. ISBN 978-0-631-20748-1.
- Our Minds, Our Selves: A Brief History of Psychology. Princeton University Press. 2018. ISBN 978-0-691-17508-9.
