= Elisabeth Young-Bruehl =

American writer (1946–2011)

Elisabeth Young-Bruehl (born Elisabeth Bulkley Young; March 3, 1946 – December 1, 2011) was an American academic, psychotherapist and psychoanalyst. She published a wide range of books, most notably biographies of Hannah Arendt and Anna Freud. Her 1982 biography of Arendt won the first Harcourt Award, and The Anatomy of Prejudices (not a biography) won the Association of American Publishers' prize for Best Book in Psychology in 1996. She was a member of the Toronto Psychoanalytic Society and co-founder of Caversham Productions, a company that makes psychoanalytic educational materials.

== Life ==
Young-Bruehl's family on her mother's side ran a dairy farm on land near the head of Chesapeake Bay, and were active in local Maryland politics. Her mother's father and grandfather (a newspaper editor) had been amateur scholars with a large private library. Her maternal grandmother was a Mayflower descendant, part of the Hooker and Bulkley families of Connecticut. Her father's family were Virginians, several trained in Theology at the College of William & Mary in Williamsburg, Virginia, where the family home, the Maupin-Dixon House, is located. She grew up in Maryland and Delaware, where her father worked as a teaching golf pro.

Then she attended Sarah Lawrence College, where she studied poetry writing with Muriel Rukeyser. Young-Bruehl left college for the New York City counterculture of the mid-1960s, but then completed her undergraduate studies at The New School (then the "New School for Social Research"). There she met and married Robert Bruehl, whom she later divorced. Just as the political theorist Hannah Arendt was joining the Graduate Faculty of the New School, Young-Bruehl enrolled as a Ph.D. candidate in Philosophy. Arendt became Young-Bruehl's mentor and dissertation advisor. After earning her Ph.D. in 1974, Young-Bruehl took a faculty appointment the following year teaching philosophy in the College of Letters, Wesleyan University in Connecticut.

The next year, after Hannah Arendt died at 69, several of Arendt's émigré friends approached Young-Bruehl to take on the task of writing Arendt's biography. The resulting book, published in 1982, was the standard work on Hannah Arendt's life, until the publication of Hannah Arendt: A Life of the Mind by Thomas Meyer and Shelley Frisch which was translated and published in English on Aug 11, 2026. Young-Bruehl's biography of Arendt has been translated into many languages, including Hebrew in 2010, and a second English edition came out in 2004.

Young-Bruehl's work on the Arendt biography gave her an increasingly strong interest in psychoanalysis. In 1983, she enrolled for clinical psychoanalytic training in New Haven, Connecticut. At New Haven's Child Study Center, she met several of Anna Freud's American colleagues, and was invited to become Anna Freud's biographer, leading to the 1988 book Anna Freud: A Biography. Its second edition in 2008 had a new preface.

In 1991 Young-Bruehl left Wesleyan and moved to Philadelphia, where she taught part-time at Haverford College and continued her psychoanalytic training at the Philadelphia Association for Psychoanalysis, from which she graduated in 1999. She started a private practice as a therapist, first in Philadelphia and later in New York City. Throughout this time, she continued to publish books, including collections of her essays and the award-winning The Anatomy of Prejudices. The latter was followed in 2012 by Childism: Confronting Prejudice Against Children, published posthumously by Yale University Press.

Young-Bruehl died of a pulmonary embolism on December 1, 2011. She was 65.

== Works ==
Spanish edition of Hannah Arendt. For the love of the world

- Conor Cruise O'Brien: An Appraisal (co-author: Joanne L. Henderson. Proscenium Press, 1974, ISBN 0-912262-33-8)
- Freedom and Karl Jaspers’ Philosophy (Yale University Press, 1981, ISBN 0-300-02629-3)
- Hannah Arendt: For Love of the World (Yale University Press 1982, ISBN 0-300-02660-9; Second Edition Yale University Press, 2004, ISBN 0-300-10588-6)
- Vigil (novel, Louisiana State University Press, 1983, ISBN 0-8071-1075-2)
- Anna Freud: A Biography (Summit Books, New York, 1988, ISBN 0-671-61696-X)
- Mind and the Body Politic (Routledge, Independence, Kentucky, 1989, ISBN 0-415-90118-9)
- Foreword to Between Hell and Reason: Essays From the Resistance Newspaper "Combat", 1944-1947 (Wesleyan University Press, 1991, ISBN 0-8195-5189-9)
- Creative Characters, (Routledge, 1991, ISBN 0-415-90369-6)
- Freud on Women: A Reader (editor) (Norton, 1992, ISBN 0-393-30870-7)
- Global Cultures: a Transnational Short Fiction Reader (editor, Wesleyan University Press, 1994, ISBN 0-8195-6282-3)
- The Anatomy of Prejudices (Harvard University Press, 1996, ISBN 0-674-03190-3),
- Foreword to 1997 re-issue of David Stafford-Clark's 1965 book, What Freud Really Said: An Introduction to His Life and Thought (Schocken Books, 1997, ISBN 0-8052-1080-6)
- Subject to Biography: Psychoanalysis, Feminism, and Writing Women's Lives (Harvard Univ Press, 1999, ISBN 0-674-85371-7),
- Cherishment: a Psychology of the Heart (co-author: Faith Bethelard. Free Press, 2000, ISBN 0-684-85966-1)
- Where Do We Fall When We Fall in Love? (essays, Other Press (NY), 2003, ISBN 1-59051-068-2)
- Why Arendt Matters (Yale University Press, 2006, ISBN 978-0-300-12044-8)
- Childism: Confronting Prejudice Against Children (Yale University Press, 2012, ISBN 978-0-300-17311-6)
