= Social Research (journal) =

- Discipline: Social sciences
- Language: English
- Edited by: Arien Mack

Publication details
- History: 1934–present
- Publisher: Johns Hopkins University Press for The New School for Social Research (United States)
- Frequency: Quarterly
- Impact factor: 0.643 (2020)

Standard abbreviations
- ISO 4: Soc. Res.

Indexing
- ISSN: 0037-783X (print); 0037-783X (web)
- LCCN: 35009665
- JSTOR: 0037783X
- OCLC no.: 1664336

Links
- Journal homepage

Social Research: An International Quarterly is a quarterly academic journal of the social sciences, published by The New School for Social Research, the graduate social science division of The New School. The journal has been published continuously since 1934. The editor-in-chief is Oz Frankel.

Most issues are theme-driven, combining historical analysis, theoretical explanation, and reportage in rigorous and engaging discussion. Articles cover various fields of the social sciences and the humanities and thus promote the interdisciplinary aims that have characterized The New School for Social Research since its inception.

The themes selected are current, often pressing issues in world society. The themes often include a political angle, keeping in the tradition of the New School for Social Research's politically conscious history.

Between 1988 and 2020, the journal published the proceedings of 40 conferences it organized. The conferences aimed to enhance public understanding of critical and contested issues by exploring them in broad historical and cultural contexts.
