= Elżbieta Ettinger =

American novelist

Elżbieta Ettinger (September 19, 1924 – March 12, 2005) was a Polish-American Jewish writer.

== Early life and education ==
The daughter of Emmanuel Ettinger and Regina Stahl, she was born in Łódź. Along with her family, she was transferred to the Warsaw Ghetto but in 1942, she was able to escape the ghetto with the help of her mother and, using forged identity papers, adopted the name Elżbieta Chodakowska. She worked with the Polish resistance during World War II. In 1946, she received a degree in English and German philology from Jagellonian University and, in 1949, a MA in English philology from Warsaw University. In 1966, she earned a PhD in English and American literature from Warsaw University.

== Career ==
She worked at various jobs in post-war Poland, including journalism, translation, editing and research. Her career in Poland took a downturn after she refused a permanent post in the country's National Security office and she sought employment in the United States. Rising anti-Semitism in Poland at the time may have also contributed to her departure. From 1967 to 1974, she was a senior fellow at the Radcliffe Institute for Advanced Study. From 1975 to 1996, she was a professor of writing at the Massachusetts Institute of Technology; she helped establish the program in writing and humanistic studies there. Ettinger and her daughter later became American citizens. She also taught at the Pine Manor College in Chestnut Hill, Massachusetts from 1971 to 1973 and at the Harvard Extension School from 1972 to 1973.

Ettinger described her experiences during World War II in her first novel Kindergarten published in 1968. Her second novel Quicksand, published in 1989, described her life in post-war Poland. In 1987, she published a biography Rosa Luxemburg, A Life. In 1995, she published the controversial work, Hannah Arendt-Martin Heidegger about the relationship between a Jewish philosopher and her Nazi mentor.

== Personal life ==
In 1943, she married Gierek, a partisan sympathizer. The couple separated after the war and she had a relationship with university professor Manfred Lachs; they had a daughter.

Ettinger died of heart failure at home in Cambridge at the age of 80.

== Bibliography ==
- Ettinger, Elżbieta (1997) [1995]. Hannah Arendt/Martin Heidegger. Yale University Press. ISBN 978-0-300-07254-9.
  - Ryan, Alan (11 January 1996). "Dangerous Liaison". The New York Review of Books (Review).
  - Brent, Frances (30 May 2013). "Arendt's Affair". Tablet (Review).
