= Feivel Schiffer =

Polish poet and writer (1809–1871)

- Born: 1809; Lasezow, Duchy of Warsaw
- Died: 1871 (aged 61–62)
- Writing career
- Language: Hebrew

Feivel Schiffer (Hebrew: פַיְיבֶל שִׁיפֵער; 1809–1871) was a Polish maskilic poet and writer.

He was born in Lasezow and raised in the district of Zamość. He lived successively in Josefov, Brody, and Szebrszyn before settling in Warsaw in 1835, where he opened a private school for Jewish children. Schiffer's first major publication was Ḥatzerot ha-Shir, an epic poem on the life of the patriarch Jacob (Warsaw, 1840).

In 1843 he published Matta Leshem, an idyll on agriculture and country life in poetic prose. Schiffer advocated for a transition to agriculture among Polish Jews, and helped settle Jews on land near Zamość with the financial backing of Prince Ivan Paskevich. As an expression of gratitude, Schiffer published Davar Gevorot (Warsaw, 1845), a biography of Paskevich in Hebrew.

He later published Toledot Napoleon, a biography of Napoléon Bonaparte from a pro-Russian point of view, in two parts (Warsaw, 1849 and 1857). The work was one of the first books in Hebrew on general history. His final publication was Mehalkhim im Anashim, a translation of Adolph Freiherr Knigge's Umgang mit Menschen (Warsaw, 1866).
