= List of works by Hannah Arendt =

Hannah Arendt bibliography
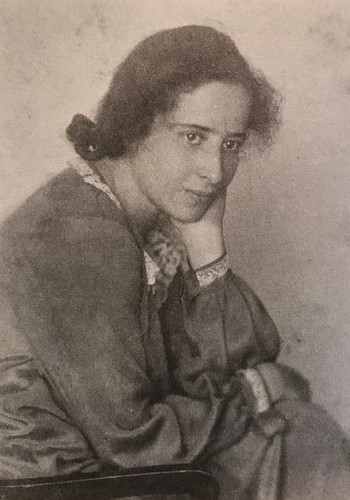
- Hannah Arendt in 1924

Hannah Arendt (/ˈɛərənt, ˈɑːr-/, US also /əˈrɛnt/, German: [ˈaːʁənt]; 14 October 1906 – 4 December 1975) was a political philosopher, author, and Holocaust survivor. She is widely considered to be one of the most influential political theorists of the 20th century.

== Bibliographies ==
- Heller, Anne C (23 July 2005). "Selected Bibliography: A Life in Dark Times". Anne C. Heller.
- Kohn, Jerome (2018). "Bibliographical Works". The Hannah Arendt Center for Politics and Humanities at Bard College., in HAC Bard (2018)
- Yanase, Yosuke (3 May 2008). "Hannah Arendt's major works". Philosophical Investigations for Applied Linguistics.
- "Arendt works". Thinking and Judging with Hannah Arendt: Political theory class. University of Helsinki. 2010–2012.

== Books ==
- Arendt, Hannah (1929). Der Liebesbegriff bei Augustin: Versuch einer philosophischen Interpretation [On the concept of love in the thought of Saint Augustine: Attempt at a philosophical interpretation] (PDF) (Doctoral thesis, Department of Philosophy, University of Heidelberg) (in German). Berlin: Springer. Archived (PDF) from the original on 2015-09-22., reprinted as
  - — (2006). Der Liebesbegriff bei Augustin: Versuch einer philosophischen Interpretation (in German). Georg Olms Verlag. ISBN 978-3-487-13262-4. Full text on Internet Archive
    - Ludz, Ursula (May 2008a). "Zwei neue Ausgaben von Hannah Arendts Dissertationsschrift". HannahArendt.net (Review) (in German). 4 (1). doi:10.57773/hanet.v4i1.144.
  - Also available in English as:
    — (1996). Scott, Joanna Vecchiarelli; Stark, Judith Chelius (eds.). Love and Saint Augustine. University of Chicago Press. ISBN 978-0-226-02596-4. Full text on Internet Archive
- — (1997) [1938, published 1957]. Weissberg, Liliane (ed.). Rahel Varnhagen: Lebensgeschichte einer deutschen Jüdin aus der Romantik [Rahel Varnhagen: The Life of a Jewess] (Habilitation thesis). Translated by Richard and Clara Winston. Baltimore: Johns Hopkins University Press. ISBN 978-0-8018-5587-0. 400 pages. (see Rahel Varnhagen)
  - Azria, Régine (1987). "Review of Rahel Varnhagen. La vie d'une juive allemande à l'époque du romantisme". Archives de sciences sociales des religions (Review). 32 (64.2): 233. ISSN 0335-5985. JSTOR 30129073.
  - Barnouw, Dagmar (2001). "Rahel Levin Varnhagen: The Life and Work of a German Jewish Intellectual (review)". Shofar: An Interdisciplinary Journal of Jewish Studies (Review). 19 (2): 174–76. doi:10.1353/sho.2001.0181. ISSN 1534-5165. S2CID 170711414.
  - Elon, Amos (18 February 1999). "A Fugitive from Egypt and Palestine". The New York Review of Books (Review).
    - Weissberg, Liliane; Elon, Amos (10 June 1999). "Hannah Arendt's Integrity". The New York Review of Books (Editorial letters).
  - Zohn, Harry (1960). "Review of Rahel Varnhagen. The Life of a Jewess". Jewish Social Studies (Review). 22 (3): 180–81. ISSN 0021-6704. JSTOR 4465809.
- — (1976) [1951, New York: Schocken]. The Origins of Totalitarianism [Elemente und Ursprünge totaler Herrschaft] (revised ed.). Houghton Mifflin Harcourt. ISBN 978-0-547-54315-4., (see also The Origins of Totalitarianism and Comparison of Nazism and Stalinism) Full text (1979 edition) on Internet Archive
  - Riesman, David (1 April 1951). "The Origins of Totalitarianism, by Hannah Arendt". Commentary (Review).
  - Nisbet, Robert (1992). "Arendt on Totalitarianism". The National Interest (Review) (27): 85–91. JSTOR 42896812.
- — (2013) [1958]. The Human Condition (Second ed.). University of Chicago Press. ISBN 978-0-226-92457-1. (see also The Human Condition)
- — (1958). Die ungarische Revolution und der totalitäre Imperialismus (in German). München: R. Piper & Co Verlag.
- — (2006) [1961, New York: Viking]. Between Past and Future. Penguin Publishing Group. ISBN 978-1-101-66265-6. (see also Between Past and Future)
- — (2006b) [1963, New York: Viking]. On Revolution. Penguin Publishing Group. ISBN 978-1-101-66264-9. (see also On Revolution) Full text on Internet Archive
- — (2006a) [1963, Viking Press, revised 1968]. Eichmann in Jerusalem: A Report on the Banality of Evil. Penguin Publishing Group. ISBN 978-1-101-00716-7. Full text: 1964 edition (see also Eichmann in Jerusalem)
- — (1968). Men in Dark Times. New York: Harcourt Brace Jovanovich. ISBN 978-0-15-658890-4.
  - Slonem, Marc (17 November 1968). "Men in Dark Times". New York Times Book Review (Review). p. 6.
- — (1972). Crises of the Republic: Lying in Politics; Civil Disobedience; On Violence; Thoughts on Politics and Revolution. New York: Harcourt Brace Jovanovich. ISBN 978-0-15-623200-5. (Note: "Civil Disobedience" originally appeared, in somewhat different form, in The New Yorker. Versions of the other essays originally appeared in The New York Review of Books) "Lying in Politics" (PDF).
  - Nott, Kathleen (1 August 1972). "Crises of the Republic, by Hannah Arendt". Commentary (Review).

== Articles and essays ==
- —; Stern, Günther (1930). "Rilkes Duineser Elegien". Neue Schweizer Rundschau. 23: 855–871. doi:10.5169/seals-760191. (English translation in Arendt & Stern (2007m, pp. 1–23))
- — (12 April 1930a). "Augustin und Protestantismus" [Augustine and Protestanism]. Frankfurter Zeitung. No. 902. Translated by Robert and Rita Kimber. p. 1. (reprinted in Arendt (2011, pp. 24–27))
- — (1930b). "Philosophie und Soziologie. Anläßlich Karl Mannheims Ideologie und Utopie" [Philosophy and Sociology]. Die Gesellschaft. 7 (1). Translated by Robert and Rita Kimber: 163–176. (reprinted in Arendt (2011, pp. 28–43))
- — (1931). "Rezension von: Hans Weil: Die Entstehung des Deutschen Bildungsprinzips" [On the emancipation of women]. Archiv für Sozialwissenschaft und Sozialpolitik (Review). 66. Translated by Elisabeh Young-Bruehl: 200–05.
- — (1932). "Aufklärung und Judenfrage" [The Enlightenment and the Jewish Question]. Zeitschrift für die Geschichte der Juden in Deutschland (in German). 4 (2/3): 65–77. (reprinted in Arendt-Stern (2009m, pp. 3–18))
- — (1932a). "Rezension über Alice Rühle-Gerstel: Das Frauenproblem in der Gegenwart. Eine psychologische Bilanz". Die Gesellschaft (in German). 10 (2): 177–179. (reprinted in Arendt (2011, pp. 66–68))
- — (13–17 September 1932b). "Adam-Müller-Renaissance?". Kölnische Zeitung (in German). No. 501, 510. (English translation in Arendt (2007n, pp. 38–45))
- "Antisemitism" (c. 1938-1939) Published posthumously in The Jewish Writings. Schocken, 2007. pp. 46-121.
- — (July 1942). "From the Dreyfus Affair to France Today". Jewish Social Studies. 4 (3): 195–240. JSTOR 4615201.
- — (31 January 1943). "We refugees" (PDF). Menorah Journal. 31 (1): 69–77. Archived from the original (PDF) on 9 February 2019., reprinted in Arendt (1978a, pp. 55–67)
- — (1944). "The Jew as Pariah: A Hidden Tradition". Jewish Social Studies. 6 (2): 99–122. JSTOR 4464588. (reprinted in Arendt (2009n, pp. 275–297)
- Arendt, Hannah. “Race-Thinking before Racism.” The Review of Politics, vol. 6, no. 1, January 1944, pp. 36–73. JSTOR, http://www.jstor.org/stable/1404080.
- Arendt, Hannah. "Franz Kafka: A Revaluation." Partisan Review, vol. 11, no. 4, Fall 1944, pp. 412-422
- Arendt, Hannah. “Approaches to the German Problem.” Partisan Review. Vol. 12, No. 1: January, 1945.
- Arendt, Hannah. “Parties, Movements, and Classes.” Partisan Review. Vol. 12, No. 4: October, 1945.
- Arendt, Hannah. “Imperialism, Nationalism, Chauvinism.” The Review of Politics, vol. 7, no. 4, 1945, pp. 441–63. JSTOR, http://www.jstor.org/stable/1404068.
- Arendt, Hannah (1946-05-01). "The Jewish State: Fifty Years After" . Commentary Magazine .
- Arendt, Hannah. “Expansion and the Philosophy of Power.” The Sewanee Review, vol. 54, no. 4, 1946, pp. 601–16. JSTOR, http://www.jstor.org/stable/27537695.
- Arendt, Hannah. "The Rights of Man: What Are They?" Modern Review, vol. 3, no. 1, Summer 1949, pp. 24–36.
- — (1953). "Ideology and Terror: A Novel Form of Government". The Review of Politics. 15 (3): 303–327. doi:10.1017/S0034670500001510. JSTOR 1405171. S2CID 145038093.
- — (1958). "Totalitarian Imperialism: Reflections on the Hungarian Revolution". The Journal of Politics. 20 (1): 5–43. doi:10.2307/2127387. JSTOR 2127387. S2CID 154428972.
- — (Winter 1959). "Reflections on Little Rock" (PDF). Dissent. Vol. 6, no. 6. pp. 45–56. Archived from the original (PDF) on 8 September 2017.
- — (Spring 1959). "A reply to critics". Dissent. Vol. 6, no. 7. pp. 179–81.
- — (February–March 1963). "Eichmann in Jerusalem. 5 parts". The New Yorker.
- — (19 October 1968a). "Walter Benjamin". The New Yorker. p. 65.
- — (21 October 1971). "Martin Heidegger at Eighty". New York Review of Books. Translated by Albert Hofstadter. p. 51.
- — (20 January 1975). "Remembering W. H. Auden". The New Yorker.

== Correspondence ==
- Arendt, Hannah; Jaspers, Karl (1992). Köhler, Lotte; Saner, Hans (eds.). Hannah Correspondence, 1926–1969. Translated by Robert and Rita Kimber. New York: Harcourt Brace Jovanovich. ISBN 978-0-15-107887-5.
- Arendt, Hannah; Kazin, Alfred (February 2005). Mahrdt, Helgard (ed.). "The correspondence between Hannah Arendt and Alfred Kazin". Samtiden. No. 1. pp. 107–54.
- Arendt, Hannah; McCarthy, Mary (1995). Brightman, Carol (ed.). Between friends: the correspondence of Hannah Arendt and Mary McCarthy, 1949–1975. Harcourt Brace. ISBN 978-0-15-100112-5.
- Arendt, Hannah; Blücher, Heinrich (2000) [1996]. Kohler, Lotte (ed.). Within Four Walls: The Correspondence Between Hannah Arendt and Heinrich Blücher, 1936–1968. Translated by Peter Constantine. Harcourt. ISBN 978-0-15-100303-7.
  - Elon, Amos (5 July 2001). "Scenes from a Marriage". The New York Review of Books (Review).
- Arendt, Hannah; Heidegger, Martin (2004) [1999 Klostermann]. Ludz, Ursula (ed.). Briefe 1925 bis 1975 und andere Zeugnisse [Letters, 1925–1975]. Translated by Andrew Shields. New York: Harcourt. ISBN 978-0-15-100525-3.
  - Heidegger, Martin (24 April 1925). "This Day in Letters: Letter to Hannah Arendt". The American Reader.
  - Lilla, Mark (18 November 1999). "Ménage à Trois". The New York Review of Books (review).
  - Brightman, Carol (20 May 2004). "The Metaphysical Couple". The Nation (Review). Archived from the original on 3 April 2019.
- Arendt, Hannah; Benjamin, Walter (2006). Schöttker, Detlev; Wizisla, Erdmut (eds.). Arendt und Benjamin: Texte, Briefe, Dokumente (in German). Suhrkamp. ISBN 978-3-518-29395-9.
  - Knott, Marie Luise (May 2007). "Arendt und Benjamin. Texte, Briefe, Dokumente. Herausgegeben von Detlev Schöttker und Erdmut Wizisla, Frankfurt 2006". HannahArendt.net (Review) (in German). 1 (3).
- Arendt, Hannah; Anders, Günther (2016). Putz, Kerstin (ed.). Schreib doch mal 'hard facts' über dich: Briefe 1939 bis 1975 (in German). C.H.Beck. ISBN 978-3-406-69911-5. (excerpts)
  - Magenau, Jörg (9 October 2016). "Die Geschiedenen: Die Frage ist, wie man überlebt: Der Briefwechsel zwischen Hannah Arendt und Günther Anders". Süddeutsche Zeitung (Review) (in German).
- Arendt, Hannah (2017). Ludz, Ursula; Nordmann, Ingeborg (eds.). Wie ich einmal ohne Dich leben soll, mag ich mir nicht vorstellen: Briefwechsel mit den Freundinnen Charlotte Beradt, Rose Feitelson, Hilde Fränkel, Anne Weil-Mendelsohn und Helen Wolff (I do not like to imagine how I should live without you: correspondence with my friends) (in German). Piper ebooks. ISBN 978-3-492-97837-8.
- Arendt, Hannah; Scholem, Gershom (2017) [2011]. Knott, Marie Louise (ed.). The Correspondence of Hannah Arendt and Gershom Scholem. Translated by Anthony David. University of Chicago Press. ISBN 978-0-226-92451-9.
  - Aschheim, Steven E. (Winter 2011). "Between New York and Jerusalem". Jewish Review of Books (Review).
  - Kirsch, Adam (5 February 2018). "A Shared Debt: The Correspondence of Hannah Arendt and Gershom Scholem". Tablet (Review).

== Posthumous ==
- Arendt, Hannah (1981) [1978]. McCarthy, Mary (ed.). The Life of the Mind: The Groundbreaking Investigation on How We Think. New York: Harcourt Brace Jovanovich. ISBN 978-0-15-651992-2. Online text at Pensar el Espacio Público
  - Donoghue, Denis (Summer 1979). "Hannah Arendt's "The Life of the Mind"". The Hudson Review (Review). 32 (2): 281–88. doi:10.2307/3849978. JSTOR 3849978.
  - Mckenna, George (November 1978). "The Life of the Mind". The Journal of Politics (Review). 40 (4): 1086–88. doi:10.2307/2129914. JSTOR 2129914.
- — (1978). Feldman, Ron H (ed.). The Jew as Pariah: Jewish Identity and Politics in the Modern Age. Grove Press. ISBN 978-0-394-17042-8.
  - — (1978a) [1943]. We refugees (PDF). Archived from the original (PDF) on 9 February 2019.
  - Botstein, Leon (1983). "The Jew as Pariah: Hannah Arendt's Political Philosophy". Dialectical Anthropology (Review). 8 (1/2): 47–73. doi:10.1007/bf00249042. JSTOR 29790091. S2CID 169475999.
  - Budwig, Ernest. G. (1 January 1980). "The Jew As Pariah: Jewish Identity and Politics in the Modern Age. By Hannah Arendt. Edited by Ron Feldman. New York: Grove Press, 1978. 288 pp". Journal of Church and State (Review). 22 (1): 165. doi:10.1093/jcs/22.1.165.
  - Dannhauser, Werner J. (1 January 1979). "The Jew as Pariah, by Hannah Arendt, edited by Ron H. Feldman". Commentary (Review).
- — (1992) [1982]. Beiner, Ronald (ed.). Lectures on Kant's Political Philosophy. University of Chicago Press. ISBN 978-0-226-23178-5. Online text; text at the Internet Archive
- — (2002a). Ludz, Ursula; Nordmann, Ingeborg (eds.). Denktagebuch: 1950 bis 1973 (in German). Vol. 1. Piper. ISBN 978-3-492-04429-5.
- — (2002b). Ludz, Ursula; Nordmann, Ingeborg (eds.). Denktagebuch: 1950 bis 1973 (in German). Vol. 2. Piper. ISBN 978-3-492-04429-5.
- — (January 2000). Baehr, Peter (ed.). The Portable Hannah Arendt. Penguin Books. ISBN 978-0-14-026974-1. Full text on Internet Archive
- — (2011) [1994 Harcourt Brace & Company]. Kohn, Jerome (ed.). Essays in Understanding, 1930–1954: Formation, Exile, and Totalitarianism. Knopf Doubleday Publishing Group. ISBN 978-0-307-78703-3.
  - —; Gaus, Günter [in German] (2011a) [28 October 1964]. Was bleibt? Es bleibt die Muttersprache. Günter Gaus im Gespräch mit Hannah Arendt ["What remains? The Language remains": An interview with Günter Gaus]. Translated by Joan Stambaugh. pp. 1–23.
    - "Was bleibt? Es bleibt die Muttersprache". rbb fernsehen (in German). Rundfunk Berlin-Brandenburg. 1964-10-28. (original German transcription)
  - — (2011b) [12 April 1930, Frankfurter Zeitung]. Augustine and Protestanism. Translated by Robert and Rita Kimber. pp. 24–27.
  - — (2011c) [1930]. Philosophy and Sociology. Translated by Robert and Rita Kimber. pp. 28–43.
  - — (2011d) [1932]. On the emancipation of women. Translated by Elisabeth Young-Bruehl. pp. 66–68.
  - Teichman, Jenny (April 1994). "Understanding Arendt". The New Criterion (Review).
- — (2005). Ludz, Ursula (ed.). Ich will verstehen: Selbstauskünfte zu Leben und Werk; mit einer vollständigen Bibliographie (in German). Piper. ISBN 978-3-492-24591-3.
- — (2007a). Gottlieb, Susannah Young-ah (ed.). Reflections on Literature and Culture. Stanford University Press. ISBN 978-0-8047-4499-7.
  - —; Stern, Günther (2007m) [1930]. "Rilkes Duineser Elegien". Translated by Susannah Young-ah Gottlieb. pp. 1–23.
  - — (2007n) [1932]. "Adam-Müller-Renaissance?". pp. 38–45.
- — (2009b) [2003, Schocken]. Kohn, Jerome (ed.). Responsibility and Judgment. Knopf Doubleday Publishing Group. ISBN 978-0-307-54405-6.
  - — (1964), Personal responsibility under dictatorship (PDF), pp. 17–48, archived (PDF) from the original on 2018-08-23
- — (2009c) [2005, Schocken]. Kohn, Jerome (ed.). The Promise of Politics. Knopf Doubleday Publishing Group. ISBN 978-0-307-54287-8., partly based on Was ist Politik? (1993), French translation as Qu'est-ce que la politique?
  - — (1993). Ludz, Ursula (ed.). Was ist Politik?: Fragmente aus dem Nachlass (in German). Piper. ISBN 978-3-492-03618-4. (fragments)
  - — (2001). Qu'est-ce que la politique? (in French). Translated by Carole Widmaier. Éditions du Seuil. ISBN 978-2-02-048190-8. (extract)
- — (2009a) [2007 Schocken Books]. Kohn, Jerome; Feldman, Ron H (eds.). The Jewish Writings. Knopf Doubleday Publishing Group. ISBN 978-0-307-49628-7. at Pensar el Espacio Público
  - — (2009m) [1932]. The Enlightenment and the Jewish Question. Translated by John E. Woods. pp. 3–18.
  - — (2009n) [1944]. The Jew as Pariah: A Hidden Tradition. pp. 275–297.
  - Butler, Judith (10 May 2007). "'I merely belong to them': The Jewish Writings by Hannah Arendt, edited by Jerome Kohn and Ron Feldman 2007". London Review of Books (Review). Vol. 29, no. 9. pp. 26–28. ISSN 0260-9592.
- — (2018). Kohn, Jerome (ed.). Thinking Without a Banister: Essays in Understanding, 1953–1975. Knopf Doubleday Publishing Group. ISBN 978-1-101-87030-3.
- —(2018). Hahn, Barbara; McFarland, James (ed.). The Modern Challenge to Tradition. Fragmente eines Buchs. Wallstein (vol. 6 of the Complete Works). ISBN 978-3-8353-3192-1.
- —(2019). Hahn, Barbara (ed.). Sechs Essays. / Die verborgene Tradition. Wallstein (vol. 3 of the Complete Works). ISBN 978-3-8353-3278-2.
- —(2021). Hahn, Barbara (ed.). Rahel Varnhagen. Lebensgeschichte einer deutschen Jüdin / The Life of a Jewish Woman. Wallstein (vol. 2 of the Complete Works). ISBN 978-3-8353-3767-1.
- —(2024). Cornelissen, Wout; Bartscherer, Thomas; Eusterschulte, Anne (ed.). The Life of the Mind. Wallstein (vol. 14.1/14.2 of the Complete Works). ISBN 978-3-8353-3192-1.

== Collections ==
- "The Hannah Arendt Papers". Library of Congress. 2001.
  - Kohn, Jerome (2001). "Three Essays: The Role of Experience in Hannah Arendt's Political Thought".
- "Hannah Arendt-Archiv" (in German). Institut für Philosophie: Carl von Ossietzky Universität Oldenburg. 2018.
- "Hannah Arendt (publications)". Internet Archive.
- Hannah Arendt. Complete Works. Critical Edition. Ed. by Anne Eusterschulte, Eva Geulen, Barbara Hahn, Hermann Kappelhoff, Patchen Markell, Annette Vowinckel and Thomas Wild. Göttingen: Wallstein 2018ff. and online (publishes Arendt's complete works with the exception of the correspondence in the languages in which they were composed).

== Miscellaneous ==
- Arendt, Hannah (2007b). Fischer-Defoy, Christine (ed.). Hannah Arendt: das private Adressbuch 1951–1975 (in German). Koehler & Amelang. ISBN 978-3-7338-0357-5.
  - Ludz, Ursula (May 2008b). "Gut gestaltet, unterhaltsam, aber nicht zuverlässig – das kürzlich erschienene Arendt-Adressbuch". HannahArendt.net (Review) (in German). 4 (1). doi:10.57773/hanet.v4i1.143.
- — (2013a). Hannah Arendt: The Last Interview And Other Conversations. Melville House Publishing. ISBN 978-1-61219-312-0.
  - —; Fest, Joachim (9 November 1964). "Eichmann war von empörender Dummheit: Hannah Arendt im Gespräch mit Joachim Fest" [Eichmann was outrageously stupid: Hannah Arendt in conversation with Joachim Fest]. HannahArendt.net (in German and English). 3 (1). Translated by Andrew Brown. Germany: SWR TV. doi:10.57773/hanet.v3i1.114. (Original video)
  - Brody, Richard (3 December 2013). "Hannah Arendt's Failures of Imagination". The New Yorker (Review).
- — (18 April 1975a). "Sonning Prize acceptance speech". Miscellaneous Material. Copenhagen., reprinted as the Prologue in Arendt (2009b, pp. 3–16)
- — (15 February – 10 March 1950). "Jewish Cultural Reconstruction Field Reports, 1948–1951, No. 18". Key Documents of German-Jewish History. Hamburg: Institut für die Geschichte der deutschen Juden (IGdJ), Deutsche Forschungsgemeinschaft (DFG). doi:10.23691/jgo:source-126.en.v1.

== Bibliography ==
- Arendt. William Collins Sons & Co. 2012.
- Das Aussprachewörterbuch (in German) (7th ed.). Duden. 2015.
