= Crises of the Republic =

1972 political philosophy book by Hannah Arendt

- Author: Hannah Arendt
- Subject: Politics
- Genre: Political theory
- Publisher: Harcourt Brace Jovanovich
- Publication date: 1972
- Publication place: United States

Crises of the Republic is an anthology of four essays by Hannah Arendt, dealing with contemporary American politics and the crises it faced in the 1960s and 1970s, published in 1972.

== Structure ==
Crises of the Republic was the third of Arendt's anthologies, and as the subtitle Lying in Politics, Civil Disobedience, On Violence, Thoughts on Politics and Revolution indicates, consists of four interconnected essays on contemporary American politics and the crises it faced in the 1960s and 1970s. The first essay, "Lying in Politics" looks for an explanation behind the administration's deception regarding the Vietnam War, as revealed in the Pentagon Papers. "Civil Disobedience" examines the opposition movements, while the final "Thoughts on Politics and Revolution" is a commentary, in the form of an interview on the third essay, "On Violence".

== On Violence ==
In "On Violence", the third of these essays, Arendt breaks with the predominant conception of power as derived from violence, and that violence is an extreme manifestation of power. Power and violence are separate phenomena:

Power and violence are opposites; where the one rules absolutely, the other is absent.

The explanation is that governmental violence requires organisation, i.e. power:

In a contest of violence against violence the superiority of the government has always been absolute; but this superiority lasts only as long as the power structure of the government is intact — that is, as long as commands are obeyed and the army or police forces are prepared to use their weapons. ... Where power has disintegrated, revolutions are possible but not necessary.

More generally, Arendt defines power as property of a group:

Power corresponds to the human ability not just to act but to act in concert. Power is never the property of an individual; it belongs to a group and remains in existence only so long as the group keeps together. When we say of somebody that he is "in power" we actually refer to his being empowered by a certain number of people to act in their name.

Though violence is not a precondition for power, it may nevertheless be a means of power.

Power is indeed of the essence of all government, but violence is not. Violence is by nature instrumental; like all means, it always stands in need of guidance and justification through the end it pursues. And what needs justification by something else cannot be the essence of anything.

Bureaucracies then attract violence since they are defined as the "rule by no one" against whom to argue. Thus, bureaucracies exclude the relations with the people they rule over.

=== The Arendt-Agamben Correspondence ===
On February 21, 1970, twenty-seven-year-old Giorgio Agamben ground-mailed a typewritten request for Hannah Arendt to review his "On the Limits of Violence" and that he had "take[n] the liberty of enclosing an essay on violence..." In a response drafted less than a week later, Arendt admitted that "it will take me quite a while to read it because my Italian is not just lousy, but almost nonexistent." Arendt had previously claimed that literati Zera S. Fink's 1945 book on "Venetian vogue" for "stability" by mixed government, and the 1942 article in which Fink first examined il Discorsi passages quoted in the works of James Harrington, partially germinated her research for On Revolution. Arendt confirmed that she was "indebted to Zera Fink's important study The Classical Republicans...for the influence of Machiavelli upon Harrington and the influence of the ancients upon seventeenth-century English thought, see the excellent study by Zera S. Fink."

Agamben introduced himself to Hannah Arendt as a "young writer and essayist for whom discovering your books [Between Past and Future] last year has represented a decisive new experience." In the twenty-eighth issue of Bidoun, the Italian philosopher recalled that he had told Henry Kissinger that "you understand absolutely nothing in politics" at the Weatherhead Center for International Affairs. But that was only after he disclosed to Arendt that he had "the pleasure of attending the seminars of Heidegger convened at Provence in the Summers of 1966 and 1968." Heideggerian Jean Beaufret and French poet René Char, the latter a renowned proponent of the French Resistance, attended those particular Le Thor seminars, presumably conducted in French and ancient Greek, on Hegelian dialectic as well as arche and ontological unity of opposites in fragments of Heraclitus. Arendt's editors—or Arendt herself—only included Agamben's "On the Limits of Violence" in a footnote for the 1969-70 German edition of Arendt's "Reflections on Violence" (1969), first published in full in the New York Review of Books, and as a long essay in the Crises of the Republic (1973). Agamben published his essay for an Italian-language literary periodical later in 1970 and for the English-language Diacritics in 2009. Almost fifteen years earlier, Agamben had critically reassessed, and reformulated, Arendt's "We Refugees" (1943).

== Bibliography ==
- — (1972). Crises of the Republic: Lying in Politics, Civil Disobedience on Violence, Thoughts on Politics, and Revolution. New York: Harcourt Brace Jovanovich. ISBN 978-0-15-623200-5. (Note: "Civil Disobedience" originally appeared, in somewhat different form, in The New Yorker. Versions of the other essays originally appeared in The New York Review of Books)
  - Lying in Politics full text
  - Nott, Kathleen (1 August 1972). "Crises of the Republic, by Hannah Arendt". Commentary (Review).
