= Love and Saint Augustine =

Hannah Arendt's doctoral thesis

- Author: Hannah Arendt
- Language: German
- Subject: Philosophy
- Publisher: Julius Springer
- Publication date: 1929
- Publication place: Germany
- English publication date: 1996
- Media type: Print
- Pages: 80

Love and Saint Augustine (German: Der Liebesbegriff bei Augustin. Versuch einer philosophischen Interpretation; "On the concept of love in the thought of Saint Augustine: Attempt at a philosophical interpretation") was the title of Hannah Arendt's 1929 doctoral thesis. An English translation including revisions by Arendt was not published until 1996.

Influenced by two of her teachers, Martin Heidegger and Karl Jaspers it deals with three concepts of love in the work of St Augustine, which would appear in her works over the rest of her life. Of these the phrase amor mundi (love of the world) is often associated with Arendt and both permeates her work and was an absorbing passion. Other themes that are a key to her later work include "Natality" as a key condition of human existence and its role in the development of the individual.

== History ==
Love and Saint Augustine was the title of Hannah Arendt's doctoral thesis from the University of Heidelberg in 1929. When it was first published in Berlin it attracted critical interest. Although an English translation had been prepared by E B Ashton (Note: E B Ashton: Pseudonym of Ernst Basch (1909–1983), a fellow émigré who translated many German philosophical works, including those of Karl Jaspers, her thesis supervisor, and was the author of The Fascist: His State And His Mind (1937)) in the early 1960s, Arendt did not want it published without revising it and adding new material. Although she prepared several manuscripts, she ultimately abandoned the task and it was not published in English until after her death, in 1996.

== Structure ==
In this work, she combines approaches of both Heidegger and Jaspers, her most influential teachers. Arendt's interpretation of love in the work of St. Augustine deals with three concepts, love as craving or desire (Amor qua appetitus), love in the relationship between man (creatura) and creator (Creator - Creatura), and neighborly love (Dilectio proximi), and is constructed in three sections dealing with each of these. Love as craving anticipates the future, while love for the Creator deals with the remembered past. Of the three, dilectio proximi or caritas (Note: Latin has three nouns for love: amor, dilectio and caritas. The corresponding verbs for the first two are amare and diligere) is perceived as the most fundamental, to which the first two are oriented, which she treats under vita socialis (social life). The second of the Great Commandments (or Golden Rule) "Thou shalt love thy neighbor as thyself" uniting and transcending the former. (Note: Matthew 22:39) Augustine's influence (and Jaspers' views on his work) persisted in Arendt's writings for the rest of her life.

Amor mundi

Amor mundi — warum ist es so schwer, die Welt zu lieben?
Love of the world — why is it so difficult to love the world?

— Denktagebuch I: 522

Already in this work some of the leitmotifs of her canon were apparent. For instance, she introduced the concept of Natalität (Natality) as a key condition of human existence and its role in the development of the individual. She made clear, in her revisions to the English translation, through explicit reference, that it was "natality" that she was introducing, and would develop further in The Human Condition (1958). Although she did not specifically use the word Natalität in the original German version, she explained that the construct of natality was implied in her discussion of new beginnings and man's elation to the Creator as nova creatura. The centrality of the theme of birth and renewal is apparent in the constant reference to Augustinian thought, and specifically the innovative nature of birth, from this, her first work, to her last, The Life of the Mind.

Love is another connecting theme. In addition to the Augustinian loves expostulated in her dissertation, the phrase amor mundi (love of the world) is one often associated with Arendt and both permeates her work and was an absorbing passion from her dissertation to The Life of the Mind (1978). She took the phrase from Augustine's homily on the first epistle of St John, "If love of the world dwell in us". Amor mundi was her original title for The Human Condition (1958), (Note: Arendt explained to Karl Jaspers, in a letter dated August 6, 1955, that she intended to use St Augustine's concept of amor mundi as the title, as a token of gratitude) the subtitle of Elisabeth Young-Bruehl's biography (1982), the title of a collection of writing on faith in her work and the newsletter of the Hannah Arendt Center at Bard College.

== Bibliography ==
- Arendt, Hannah (1929). Der Liebesbegriff bei Augustin: Versuch einer philosophischen Interpretation [On the concept of love in the thought of Saint Augustine: Attempt at a philosophical interpretation] (PDF) (Doctoral thesis, Department of Philosophy, University of Heidelberg) (in German). Berlin: Springer., reprinted as
  - — (2006). Der Liebesbegriff bei Augustin: Versuch einer philosophischen Interpretation (in German). introduction by Frauke Annegret Kurbacher. Georg Olms Verlag. ISBN 978-3-487-13262-4. Full text on Internet Archive
    - Ludz, Ursula (20 May 2008). "Zwei neue Ausgaben von Hannah Arendts Dissertationsschrift". HannahArendt.net (Review) (in German). 4 (1). doi:10.57773/hanet.v4i1.144. Also available in English as:
  - — (1996). Scott, Joanna Vecchiarelli; Stark, Judith Chelius (eds.). Love and Saint Augustine. University of Chicago Press. ISBN 978-0-226-02596-4. Full text on Internet Archive
- — (2002a). Ludz, Ursula; Nordmann, Ingeborg (eds.). Denktagebuch: 1950 bis 1973 (in German). Vol. 1. Piper. ISBN 978-3-492-04429-5.
- — (2013) [1958]. The Human Condition (Second ed.). University of Chicago Press. ISBN 978-0-226-92457-1. (see also The Human Condition)
- Augustine, Saint (1995). In Joannis evangelium tractatus [Tractates on the Gospel of John, 111-24]. trans. John W Rettig. CUA Press. ISBN 978-0-8132-0092-7.
- — (2008). Tractatus in epistolam Joannis ad Parthos [Homilies on the First Epistle of John]. trans. Boniface Ramsay. New City Press. ISBN 9781565482890., available in Latin as
  - — (1837). Sancti Aurelii Augustini Hipponensis episcopi Opera omnia: post Lovaniensium theologorum recensionem castigata denuo ad manuscriptos codices gallicanos, vaticanos, belgicos etc. necnon ad editiones antiquiores et castigatiores (in Latin). apud Gaume fratres.
- Beiner, Ronald (1997). Love and worldliness: Hannah Arendt's reading of Saint Augustine. pp. 269–284., in May & Kohn (1997)
- Bernauer, J.W., ed. (1987). Amor Mundi: Explorations in the Faith and Thought of Hannah Arendt. Springer Science & Business Media. ISBN 978-94-009-3565-5.
  - Bernauer, James W. (1987a). The Faith of Hannah Arendt: Amor Mundi and its Critique — Assimilation of Religious Experience. pp. 1–28.
- Calcagno, Antonio (January 2013). "The Desire For And Pleasure Of Evil: The Augustinian Limitations Of Arendtian Mind". The Heythrop Journal. 54 (1): 89–100. doi:10.1111/j.1468-2265.2009.00513.x.
- Durst, Margarete (2004). Birth and Natality in Hannah Arendt. pp. 777–797. ISBN 9789401000475.
- Fry, Karin (2014). Natality (PDF). pp. 23–35., in Hayden (2014)
- Hayden, Patrick, ed. (2014). Hannah Arendt: Key Concepts. Routledge. ISBN 978-1-317-54588-0.
- Hilmes, Oliver (2015). Malevolent Muse: The Life of Alma Mahler. Northeastern University Press. ISBN 978-1-55553-845-3.
- Hill, Samantha Rose (26 March 2017). "What does it mean to love the world? Hannah Arendt and Amor Mundi". openDemocracy.
- Kielmansegg, Peter Graf; Mewes, Horst; Glaser-Schmidt, Elisabeth, eds. (1997). Hannah Arendt and Leo Strauss: German Émigrés and American Political Thought After World War II. Cambridge University Press. ISBN 978-0-521-59936-8.
- Kiess, John (2016). Hannah Arendt and Theology. Bloomsbury Publishing. ISBN 978-0-567-62851-0.
- May, Larry; Kohn, Jerome, eds. (1997). Hannah Arendt: Twenty Years Later. MIT Press. ISBN 978-0-262-63182-2.
- Vollrath, Ernst (1997). Hannah Arendt: A German-American Jewess views the United States - and looks back to Germany. pp. 45–58., in Kielmansegg et al (1997)
- Young-Bruehl, Elisabeth (2004) [1982]. Hannah Arendt: For Love of the World (Second ed.). Yale University Press. ISBN 978-0-300-10588-9. (updated by way of a second preface, pagination unchanged) (1st ed. Preface ix–xxv; 2nd ed. Preface to Second Edition ix–xxxvi, Preface xxxvii-l)
- "Amor Mundi". Medium.
