= On Revolution =

1963 philosophy book by Hannah Arendt

- 2006 edition
- Author: Hannah Arendt
- Subject: Politics, revolution
- Genre: Political theory
- Publisher: Penguin Books
- Publication date: 1963
- Publication place: United States

On Revolution is a 1963 book by the political theorist Hannah Arendt, who presents a comparison of two of the main 18th-century revolutions: the American Revolution and the French Revolution, where they failed, where they succeeded and where they diverged from each other.

She views the American Revolution as more successful than the French Revolution, yet criticizes modern revolutionaries' tendency to model their actions on the latter. However, she also highlights that even the American Revolution fell short of its promise to provide public freedom and public happiness for everyone. With this she means the opportunity to partake in politics and the joy gained from shaping its own environment. She proposes territorial "council systems" similar to, but distinct from, class-based council republics as a potentially superior revolutionary aim to achieve public participation and collective self-determination.

== History ==
Twelve years after the publication of her The Origins of Totalitarianism (1951), which looked at what she considered failed revolutions, Arendt optimistically turned her attention to predict nonviolent movements to restore democratic governments around the world. Her predictions turned out to be largely true since those revolutions have been largely, though unconsciously, based on the principles she laid out.

== Overview ==
In On Revolution, Arendt contrasts two major revolutions: the French Revolution, which ended in violence and terror, and the American Revolution, which established a more stable republic. She argues that while both aimed for freedom, they took vastly different paths due to their social and political contexts.

The core purpose of revolution is to achieve public freedom - the ability to participate in shaping one's political environment. This differs from private freedom (being left alone by the state) and requires first achieving liberation from economic or political constraints. Revolutions emerged only in the 18th century, enabled by Enlightenment thinking that society's structure wasn't divinely ordained but could be changed.

The French and American Revolutions diverged primarily due to their different circumstances:

- Social Conditions: France had widespread poverty, making liberation from economic hardship the urgent priority. America's white population was relatively prosperous (though this ignored the enslaved population), allowing greater focus on establishing political freedom. Poverty, for Arendt, is detrimental to genuine politics (founded in ancient Athens), which has traits including public deliberation and persuasion. Poverty unleashes violence, as long as it subordinates humans to the urges of their biological necessity. Thus, it destroys the political realm from within.
- Political Experience: American colonists had extensive practice with self-governance and local decision-making due to their distance from Britain. French citizens lived under absolute monarchy with little democratic experience. Moreover, in America poverty was not a central concern.
- Power Structure: France's absolutist tradition led revolutionaries to centralize power, essentially replacing the king with "the people" while maintaining similar structures. America's experience with British constitutional monarchy influenced its focus on separated powers and checks and balances.
- Values: French revolutionaries emphasized compassion, focusing on immediate relief of suffering. Americans emphasized solidarity, enabling more reasoned, long-term planning.

The French concept of the "general will" - the supposed collective will of the people - proved problematic as it required interpretation by revolutionaries who claimed to speak for the masses, leading to purges of supposed enemies of the revolution.

Both revolutions struggled with establishing lasting authority. Pre-revolution authority often derived from religion or tradition, but revolutions needed new sources of legitimacy. The American solution was founding authority - "we should have power because we created these rules together." However, this created a paradox: how to extend this founding experience to future generations?

Arendt argues that neither direct nor representative democracy fully achieves public freedom. Direct democracy is too volatile, while representative democracy limits citizen participation to voting. She proposes council republics as an alternative, with local councils sending representatives to higher levels of government. Such systems have emerged spontaneously in various revolutions but were typically suppressed by centralized party systems.

== Comparison to other work of Arendt ==
In an earlier book, The Human Condition, Arendt argued that there were three states of human activity: labor, work, and action. "Labor" is, essentially, a state of subsistence: doing what it takes to stay alive. For Arendt, that was the lowest form of human activity (all living creatures are capable of this). "Work" is the process of creating: a painter may create a great work of art, a writer may create a great work of fiction, etc. For Arendt, "working" is a worthwhile endeavor. Through works, people may remember someone, and if one's work is great enough, one may be remembered for thousands of years. Arendt notes that people still read the Iliad, and Homer will be remembered for as long as people keep telling his stories. However, Arendt argues the Iliad is still read only because of its protagonist, Achilles. For Arendt, Achilles embodies "action." Only by interacting with others in some sort of public forum can your legacy be passed down through the generations; only by doing something truly memorable can a person achieve immortality.

Arendt believed that the leaders of the American Revolution were true "actors" (in the Arendtian sense) and that the US Constitution created "publics" that were conducive to action. The leaders of the French Revolution, on the other hand, were too focused on subsistence (what Arendt called their "demands for bread"), as opposed to "action." For a revolution to be truly successful, it must allow for, if not demand, that these publics be created. The leaders of the American Revolution created "a public" and acted within that space; their names will be remembered. The leaders of the French Revolution got their bread; their names have been forgotten.

=== The "social question" ===
On Revolution provided conceptual underpinnings for the "social question" and the role of continental expansion in the "origins" of the American Revolution, reconfiguring Arendt's previous distinctions between systems of political ideas and philosophical pursuits, as well as between public and private space. Arendt's Neoplatonist preferences for a natalität pursuit of aletheia (not necessarily a synonym for "truth") over "mere opinion" was a factor as well. She had previously defined the "vita activa as political action distinct from productive work or necessary labor. Only the growth of mass-market economies in the eighteenth century, she argued, broke down the integrity of a distinct public space that was the essential preserve of human spontaneity." In On Revolution and again in a subsequent speech, Arendt argued that "the founding generation could still serve as a model to illuminate 'darker times' [which] demonstrated the way that she, too, held up the examples of the past to castigate the trajectory of the republic and to offer the point of foundation as a source of comfort and confidence. Significantly, her account of the precipitous position of the United States suggested that imperial overextension was a central cause of the corruption of the republic, where [historian J.G.A.] Pocock subsequently argued that its republican heritage was also the source of its expansiveness."

Along with Pocock, Arendt examined Machiavellian ideas and James Harrington's seventeenth-century revamping of these ideas into proprietary landholdings for temporal stability, transmitted to late eighteenth- and early nineteenth-century proponents of "commerce." Arendt's "non-Marxist" tome shifted the focus of the "social question" from proletariat uprisings to the "rise of political economy in the eighteenth century and its clash with [adherents of] the ancient vision of citizenship and liberty." Despite the transition from landholdings to an "interests"-based political economy, in enshrining themselves and narratives of customary and civil law into foundational moments that, in the absence of "transcendent sources of authority", became "a space of time that preceded and would transcend one's life...the American founders had provided a unique example of how contingent and groundless origins could become a source for stability through time." She elucidated these arguments in the 1971 "Thoughts on Politics and Revolution", republished and expanded in the Crises of the Republic collection—which also included the "On Violence" essay that incited the 1970 Arendt-Agamben correspondence. According to Mira Siegelberg, both Arendt's and Pocock's arguments rested on the importance of historical thinking.

Arendt claimed that Zera Fink's book, and the 1942 article in which Fink first examined il Discorsi passages quoted in the works of James Harrington, partially germinated her research for On Revolution. Arendt confirmed that she was "indebted to Zera Fink's important study The Classical Republicans...for the influence of Machiavelli upon Harrington and the influence of the ancients upon seventeenth-century English thought, see the excellent study by Zera S. Fink."

== Criticism ==
Critics of On Revolution include Eric Hobsbawm, who argued that Arendt's approach was selective in terms of cases and the evidence drawn from them. For example, he claimed that Arendt unjustifiably excludes revolutions that did not occur in the West, such as the 1911 Revolution, and that her description of the Russian Revolution is a mischaracterization. That made Hobsbawm find the link between Arendtian revolutions and history to be "as incidental as that of medieval theologians and astronomers." He found further fault with how normative Arendt's conception of revolution describes its basis as "explicit old-fashioned philosophical idealism." For others, Arendt rooted the premises of On Revolution in grave misunderstandings of how material inequality influenced the birth of democracy in ancient Athens, in which she believed that economic concerns played a minor role. She also deemphasized an uneven distribution of wealth as both cause and consequence of the American Revolution. Moreover, she turned a blind eye on how social movements - like the movement of American Populism - "incited by mass poverty, can inspire genuine political action."

== Bibliography ==
- Arendt, Hannah (1976) [1951, New York: Schocken]. The Origins of Totalitarianism [Elemente und Ursprünge totaler Herrschaft] (revised ed.). Houghton Mifflin Harcourt. ISBN 978-0-547-54315-4., (see also The Origins of Totalitarianism and Comparison of Nazism and Stalinism) Full text (1979 edition) on Internet Archive (no longer available)
- — (2006) [1963, New York: Viking]. On Revolution. Penguin Publishing Group. ISBN 978-1-101-66264-9. Full text on Internet Archive
  - Schell, Jonathan (2006). Introduction: The Arendtian Revolutions. pp. 7–20., in Arendt (2006)
- Wellmer, Albrecht (1999). "Hannah Arendt on Revolution". Revue Internationale de Philosophie. 53 (208 (2)): 207–222. JSTOR 23955552.
- Hobsbawm, E. J. (1973). Revolutionaries: Contemporary Essays. London: Weidenfeld and Nicolson. pp. 201–209. ISBN 0297765493.
