= Adrian Daub =

German literary scholar

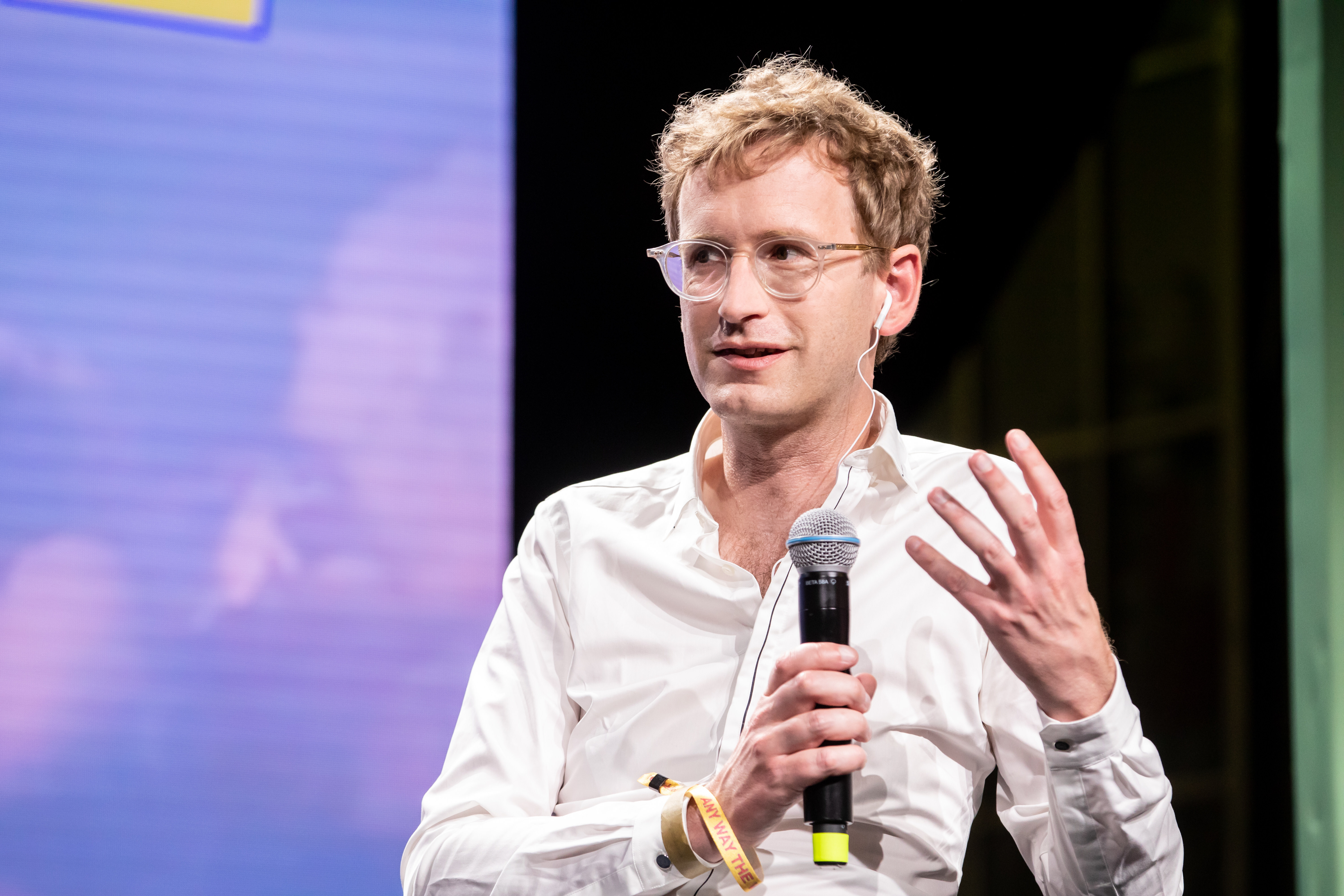
- Born: 1980 (age 45–46); Cologne, Germany

Academic background
- Education: Swarthmore College (BA); University of Pennsylvania (MA, PhD)

Academic work
- Discipline: German Studies; Gender studies
- Sub-discipline: German Romanticism; German Idealism; German film; German music; Modern German literature; Intellectual history
- Institutions: Stanford University

Adrian Daub (born 1980 in Cologne) is a German literary scholar and Professor of German and Comparative Literature at Stanford University, who has served as the Director of Feminist, Gender, and Sexuality Studies and serves as the Barbara D. Finberg Director of the Clayman Institute at Stanford.

== Life and career ==
Daub received a B.A. from Swarthmore College in 2003 before completing an M.A. and Ph.D. at the University of Pennsylvania. His dissertation dealt with the marriage philosophies in German Romanticism and Idealism and was under the direction of Liliane Weissberg.

Daub was an assistant professor of German (2008–2013) and associate professor of German (2013–2016) at Stanford and was appointed full Professor of German Studies and Comparative Literature in 2016. At Stanford, he served as the Director of Feminist, Gender, and Sexuality Studies (2016–2020) and, since 2019, has served as the Barbara D. Finberg Director of the Clayman Institute at Stanford.

Daub has been the co-editor of the Goethe Yearbook and General Editor of Republics of Letters – A Journal for the Study of Knowledge, Politics, and the Arts.

Daub's scholarship focuses on the history of German literature, culture, and intellectual life since 1790, German Idealism and German Romanticism, philosophy, gender and sexuality, German literature and film since the end of World War II, music and German modernism, operas of the fin de siècle, the Frankfurt School, photography and literature, and collective memory.

== Bibliography (selected works) ==
=== Books ===
- „Zwillingshafte Gebärden“: Zur kulturellen Wahrnehmung des vierhändigen Klavierspiels im neunzehnten Jahrhundert. Königshausen & Neumann, Würzburg 2009, ISBN 978-3-8260-3894-5
- Uncivil unions: The Metaphysics of Marriage in German Idealism & Romanticism. University of Chicago Press, Chicago 2012, ISBN 978-0-226-13693-6
- Tristan's Shadow: Sexuality and the Total Work of Art after Wagner. Chicago University Press, Chicago 2013, ISBN 978-0-226-08213-4
- Four-Handed Monsters: Four-Hand Piano Playing and Nineteenth-Century Culture. Oxford University Press, Oxford 2014, ISBN 978-0-19-998177-9
- with Charles Kronengold: The James Bond Songs: Pop Anthems of Late Capitalism. Oxford University Press, Oxford 2015, ISBN 978-0-19-023455-3
- Pop Up Nation: Innenansichten aus dem Silicon Valley. Hanser, München 2016, ISBN 978-3-446-25376-6
- Was das Valley denken nennt. Über die Ideologie der Techbranche. Suhrkamp, Berlin 2020, ISBN 978-3-518-12750-6
- What Tech Calls Thinking: An Inquiry into the Intellectual Bedrock of Silicon Valley. FSG Originals, 2020, ISBN 978-0-374-53864-4
- The Cancel Culture Panic: How an American Obsession Went Global. Stanford University Press, 2024, ISBN 978-1-5036-4084-9
- What Tech Calls Governing. Stanford University Press, 2026, ISBN 978-1-5036-4833-3

=== Articles ===
- "Adorno's Schreker: Charting the self-dissolution of the distant sound." Cambridge Opera Journal 18, no. 3 (2006): 247-271.
- "Mother Mime: Siegfried, the Fairy Tale, and the Metaphysics of Sexual Difference." 19th-century Music 32, no. 2 (2008): 160-177.
- "" HANNAH, CAN YOU HEAR ME?"—CHAPLIN'S" GREAT DICTATOR"," SCHTONK," AND THE VICISSITUDES OF VOICE." Criticism 51, no. 3 (2009): 451-482.
- "From Maximin to Stonewall: Sexuality and the Afterlives of the George Circle." The Germanic Review: Literature, Culture, Theory 87, no. 1 (2012): 19-34.
- "“An All-Too-Secret Wagner”: Ernst Bloch the Wagnerian." The Opera Quarterly 30, no. 2-3 (2014): 188-204.
- "HERMANN NITSCH–AUSTRIA IN THE AGE OF POST-SCANDALOUS CULTURE." German Life and Letters 67, no. 2 (2014): 260-278.
- with Elisabeth Bronfen. "Broomhilda Unchained: Tarantino’s Wagner." The Wagner Journal 9, no. 2 (2015): 55-67.
