= Jonathan M. Hess =

American philologist

Professor Jonathan M. Hess

UNC Head of Germanic and Slavic Language and Literatures
- In office January 1, 2016 – April 9th, 2018

Director of UNC Center for Jewish Studies
- In office 2003–2013

Personal details
- Born: Jonathan Morris Hess; May 30, 1965
- Died: April 9, 2018 (aged 52) Chapel Hill, North Carolina
- Party: Democratic
- Spouse: Beth Posner (m. 1992)
- Children: 3
- Education: Yale University; Johns Hopkins University; University of Pennsylvania
- Website: UNC website

Jonathan M. Hess (May 30, 1965 – April 9, 2018) was an American philologist and literary scholar, who served as chair of the Germanic and Slavic Languages and Literatures Department and director of the Center for Jewish Studies at the University of North Carolina, Chapel Hill.

== Life and career ==
Hess earned his bachelor's degree from Yale University, then pursued a master's degree from Johns Hopkins University before completing his graduate studies at the University of Pennsylvania. His dissertation was titled “Aesthetic States: The Political Investments of Aesthetic Autonomy” (1993) and was completed under the direction of Liliane Weissberg.

He joined the University of North Carolina, Chapel Hill faculty in 1993 and was promoted to full professor in 2003. In 2005, Hess was appointed Moses M. and Hannah L. Malkin Distinguished Professor of Jewish History and Culture.

Hess died suddenly on April 9, 2018. Professor Hess is survived by his wife and three children.

The Jonathan M. Hess Term Professorship at the University of North Carolina was established in honor of him.

== Bibliography ==
=== Authored works ===
- Reconstituting the Body Politic: Enlightenment, Public Culture and the Invention of Aesthetic Autonomy (Wayne State University Press, 1999)
- Germans, Jews and the Claims of Modernity (Yale University Press, 2002)
- Middlebrow Literature and the Making of German-Jewish Identity (Stanford University Press, 2010)
- Deborah and Her Sisters: How One Nineteenth-Century Melodrama and a Host of Celebrated Actresses Put Judaism on the World Stage (University of Pennsylvania Press, 2018)

=== Edited works ===
- Literary Studies and the Pursuits of Reading (Camden House, 2012)
- Nineteenth-Century Jewish Literature: A Reader (Stanford University Press, 2013)

=== Articles (selection) ===
- "Ludwig Börne's Visit to the Anatomical Cabinet: The Writing of Jewish Emancipation." New German Critique 55 (1992): 105-126.
- "Wordsworth's aesthetic state: the poetics of liberty." Studies in romanticism (1994): 3-29.
- "Sugar Island Jews? Jewish Colonialism and the Rhetoric of" Civic Improvement" in Eighteenth-Century Germany." Eighteenth-Century Studies 32, no. 1 (1998): 92-100.
- "Fictions of a German-Jewish Public: Ludwig Jacobowski's" Werther the Jew" and Its Readers." Jewish social studies 11, no. 2 (2005): 202-230.
- "Leopold Kompert and the work of Nostalgia: the cultural capital of German Jewish ghetto fiction." The Jewish Quarterly Review 97, no. 4 (2007): 576-615.
- "Moses Mendelssohn and the Polemics of History." In Modern Judaism and Historical Consciousness, pp. 1–27. Brill, 2007.
- "Beyond subversion: German Jewry and the poetics of middlebrow culture." The German Quarterly 82, no. 3 (2009): 316-335.
- Off to America and back again, or Judah Touro and other products of the German Jewish imagination." Jewish Social Studies: History, Culture, Society 19, no. 2 (2013): 1-23.
