= Liliane Weissberg =

American literary scholar and cultural historian

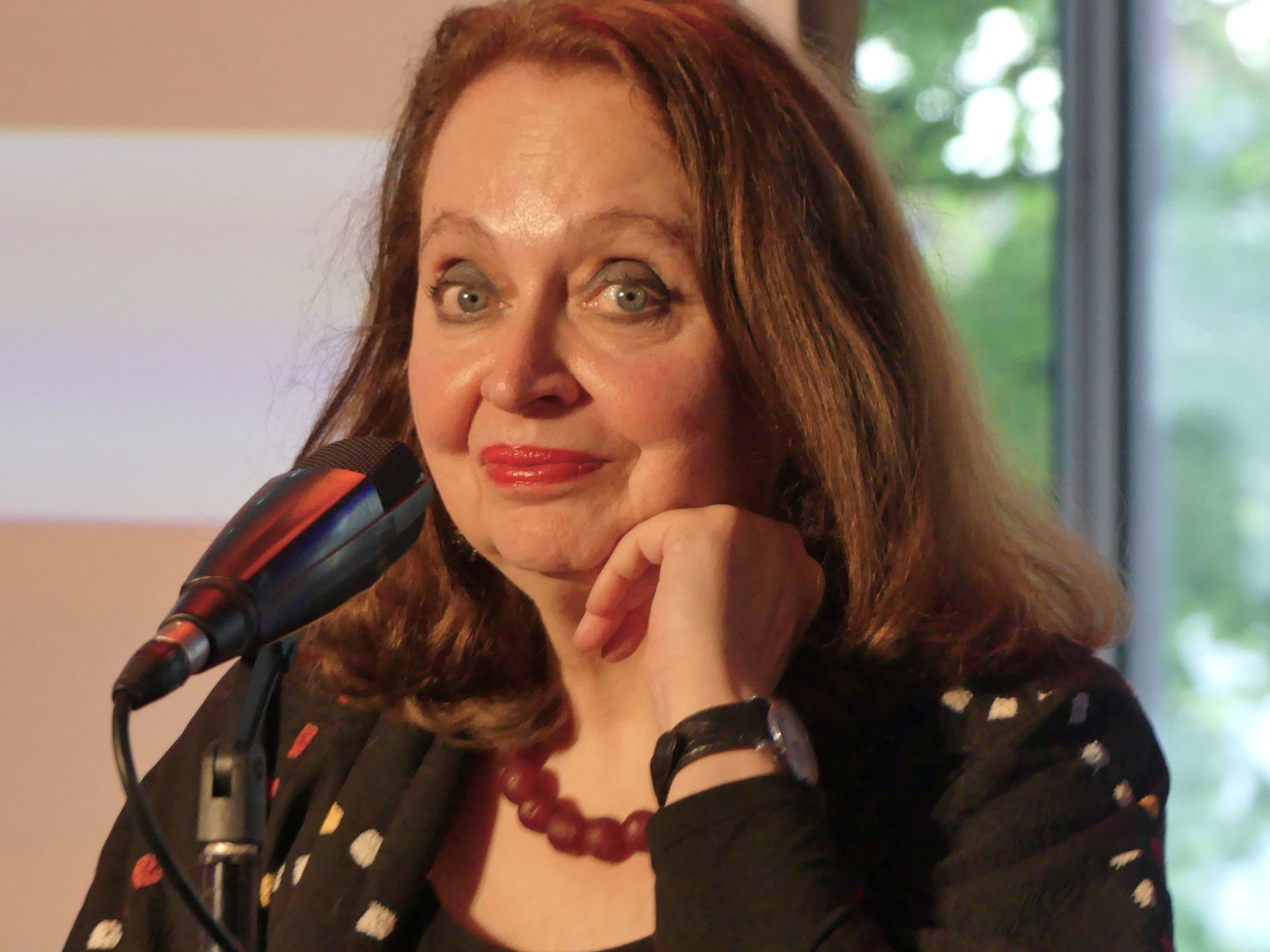
- Weissberg in 2025
- Born: 1953 (age 72–73); Vienna, Austria
- Occupations: Literary scholar, cultural historian
- Awards: Guggenheim Fellowship (1992); Humboldt Research Award (2012); Berlin Prize (2020)

Academic background
- Education: Free University of Berlin (MA), Harvard University (PhD)

Academic work
- Discipline: German studies; Comparative literature
- Sub-discipline: German-Jewish studies; Modern German literature and; Modern American literature (18th — early 20th century)
- Institutions: Johns Hopkins University; University of Pennsylvania
- Notable students: Jonathan M. Hess; Adrian Daub
- Main interests: German-Jewish and Cultural Studies; German-Jewish figures: Sigmund Freud, Hannah Arendt and Walter Benjamin; Romanticism; Jewish-German Enlightenment; Psychoanalytic theory; Material culture

Liliane Weissberg (born 1953) is an American literary scholar and cultural historian specializing in German-Jewish studies and German and American literature. She is currently the Christopher H. Browne Distinguished Professor in Arts and Sciences and professor of German and Comparative Literature at the University of Pennsylvania. She received, among others, a Guggenheim Fellowship, the Humboldt Research Award for her research on German-Jewish literature and culture and the Berlin Prize of the American Academy in Berlin, and holds an honorary degree from the University of Graz.

== Life and career ==
Liliane Weissberg was born in Vienna, Austria, in 1953 to a Jewish family. Her parents were political refugees who had fled from Poland in 1949. She grew up in Frankfurt, Germany.

Weissberg graduated from the Free University of Berlin in 1977 with a master's degree in general and comparative literature, German studies, and linguistics. She obtained a Ph.D. in comparative literature from Harvard University in 1984, concentrating on American, German, and French literature. Her dissertation thesis examined allegories in Edgar Allan Poe.

After teaching as an assistant professor of German at Johns Hopkins University (1983-1989), Weissberg joined the faculty of the University of Pennsylvania as an associate professor of German and Comparative Literature in 1989 and was promoted to full professor in 1994. She was the Joseph B. Glossberg Term Chair in the Humanities for several years. Since 2004, she has been the Christopher H. Browne Distinguished Professor in Arts and Sciences. At Penn, she has several times served as graduate chair of the Department of Germanic Languages and Literatures and as director of the program in Comparative Literature and Literary Theory.

Weissberg has been a guest professor at several universities in the United States, Germany, Austria, and Switzerland (Princeton University, the University of Hamburg, RWTH Aachen University, Goethe University Frankfurt, the Humboldt University of Berlin, the University of Potsdam, the Ruhr University Bochum, the Heidelberg University of Jewish Studies, the University of Innsbruck, the University of Vienna, and the ETH Zurich), and has held visiting chairs at the University of Hamburg, the University of Graz, and the University of Kassel. She has also been a fellow at the Voltaire Foundation Oxford, the Center for Advanced Studies at LMU Munich, the Katz Center for Advanced Judaic Studies at the University of Pennsylvania, the Research Library Gotha, the Dubnow Institute in Leipzig, the IFK Vienna and the IZEA at the Martin Luther University Halle-Wittenberg.

Weissberg has curated exhibitions at the Slought Gallery at Penn, Jewish Museum Frankfurt, the Museum of Modern Literature in Marbach, and the German Historical Museum in Berlin. She has served on numerous institutional boards, is currently a member of the board of the German Historical Museum in Berlin and the advisory board of the Leo Baeck Institute London, and the Center for Jewish Studies, Graz. She was one of the founding members of the Research Center Sanssouci for the Study of the Enlightenment (RECS), a collaboration between the University of Potsdam and the Public Castles and Gardens Sanssouci, and served on the advisory board of the Moses Mendelssohn Center in Potsdam. Weissberg has also been a guest speaker on several radio shows, including BBC World Service, CBC Toronto, Deutschlandfunk, Hessischer Rundfunk, Bayerischer Rundfunk, NPR and the MLA radio service.

== Research ==
With her books and more than 200 academic articles, Weissberg's research has covered German and American literature from the eighteenth to early twentieth centuries, cultural studies, literary and psychoanalytic theory, aesthetics and material culture. She has contributed to the rediscovery of German-Jewish literary and cultural traditions and has researched the German-Jewish Enlightenment (Haskala), Romanticism in America and Europe, German realism, and visual studies. Weissberg has also studied issues concerning the Holocaust. She has extensively dealt with figures like Edgar Allan Poe, Rahel Varnhagen, Hannah Arendt, Dorothea Schlegel, Henriette Herz, Johann Gottfried Herder, Moses Mendelssohn, Walter Benjamin, Sigmund Freud, Friedrich Schiller, Johann Wolfgang von Goethe and Heinrich von Kleist.

== Awards ==
- Senior Fellow, IFK Vienna (2023)
- Honorary Degree (Dr. phil. h.c.), University of Graz (2022)
- Research Prize Fellowship, Alexander von Humboldt Foundation (2019)
- Berlin Prize; Anna-Maria Kellen Fellowship, American Academy in Berlin (2020)
- Humboldt Research Award, Alexander von Humboldt Foundation (2012)
- Fulbright-Freud Visiting Scholarship/Professorship, Sigmund Freud Museum and University of Vienna
- Fellow at Center for Advanced Studies, LMU Munich (2010, 2013, 2018)
- Christian R. and Mary F. Lindback Foundation Award for Distinguished Teaching, University of Pennsylvania (2003)
- Fellow of the American Philosophical Society (1998)
- Fellow of the Memorial Foundation for Jewish Culture (1992)
- Fellow of the John Simon Guggenheim Memorial Foundation (1992)
- Voltaire Foundation Fellow at Wadham College, Oxford University (1991)

== Bibliography ==
=== Monographs ===
- Geistersprache. Philosophischer und literarischer Diskurs im späten achtzehnten Jahrhundert. Königshausen & Neumann, Würzburg 1990, ISBN 3-88479-480-9.
- Edgar Allan Poe (= Sammlung Metzler. Band 204). Metzler, Stuttgart 1991, ISBN 3-476-10204-1.
- Hannah Arendt, Charlie Chaplin and the Hidden Jewish Tradition(= Vorlesungen des Centrums für Jüdische Studien. Band 1). Leykam, Graz 2009, ISBN 978-3-7011-0165-8.
- Über Haschisch und Kabbala. Gershom Scholem, Siegfried Unseld und das Werk von Walter Benjamin (= Marbacher Magazin. 140). Deutsche Schillergesellschaft, Marbach am Neckar 2012, ISBN 978-3-937384-94-8.
- Münzen, Hände, Noten, Finger: Berliner Hofjuden und die Erfindung einer deutschen Musikkultur (= Vorlesungen des Centrums für Jüdische Studien Graz. 12). Clio Verlag, Graz 2018, ISBN 978-3-902542-71-7.

=== Editions ===
- Weiblichkeit als Maskerade. Fischer, Frankfurt am Main 1994, ISBN 3-596-11850-6.
- Hannah Arendt: Rahel Varnhagen. The Life of a Jewess. The Johns Hopkins University Press, 2000, ISBN 0-8018-6335-X.
- Kennedy J. Gerald and Liliane Weissberg. 2001. Romancing the Shadow : Poe and Race. New York: Oxford University Press. ISBN 0-19-513710-8.
- Affinität wider Willen? Hannah Arendt, Theodor W. Adorno und die Frankfurter Schule (= Jahrbuch zur Geschichte und Wirkung des Holocaust. 2011). Campus Verlag, Frankfurt am Main 2011, ISBN 978-3-593-39490-9.
- Beckman, Karen, and Liliane Weissberg, eds. On Writing with Photography. Minneapolis, MN: University of Minnesota Press, 2013.978-0-8166-8885-2.
- (with Andreas Kilcher) Nachträglich, grundlegend: Der Kommentar als Denkform in der jüdischen Moderne von Hermann Cohen bis Jacques Derrida.ISBN 978-3-8353-3369-7.
- Benjamin Veitel Ephraim: Kaufmann, Schriftsteller, Geheimagent. 2021, ISBN 978-3-11-072240-6.
- Psychoanalysis, Fatherhood, and the Modern Family. 2021, ISBN 978-3-03082123-4.

=== Articles (selection) ===
- „Der Jude als Paria: Stationen in der Geschichte einer Idee im Diskurs der Assimilation“. In: Christina von Braun (Hrsg.): Was war das deutsche Judentum? (= Europäisch-jüdische Studien. Beiträge 24). Oldenbourg De Gruyter, 2015, p. 117–133.
- Rückkehr im Widerstand. In: Katharine Rauschenberger (Hrsg.): Rückkehr in Feindesland? Fritz Bauer in der deutsch-jüdischen Nachkriegsgeschichte. (= Jahrbuch des Fritz Bauer-Instituts. 2013). Campus Verlag, Frankfurt am Main 2013, p. 15–37.
- Sehnsucht nach Goethe. Sigmund Freud und der Sommer 1931. In: Stephan Braese, Daniel Weidner (Hrsg.): Deutsche *Sprachkultur von Juden und die Geisteswissenschaften. Kadmos Verlag, Berlin 2015, p. 201–214.
- Das Unbewußte der Bundesrepublik: Alexander Mitscherlich popularisiert die Psychoanalyse. In: Zeitschrift für Geistes- und Ideengeschichte. V 3, 2011, p. 45–64.
- Karl Löwiths Weltreise. In: Monika Boll, Raphael Gross (Hrsg.): „Ich staune, dass Sie in dieser Luft atmen können“. *Jüdische Intellektuelle in Deutschland nach 1945. Fischer Verlag, Frankfurt am Main 2013, p. 126–170.
- Postcards from the Avant-Garde. In: MLN. Band 132, Nr. 3: Else Lasker-Schüler and the Avantgarde. 2017, p. 575–601.
