= Kathleen Nott =

British poet, novelist, critic, philosopher and editor

Kathleen Cecilia Nott FRSL (11 February 1905 – 20 February 1999) was a British poet, novelist, critic, philosopher and editor.

== Life ==
Kathleen Nott was born in Camberwell, London. Her father, Philip, was a lithographic printer, and her mother, Ellen, ran a boarding house in Brixton; Kathleen was their third daughter. She was educated at Mary Datchelor Girls' School, London, before attending King's College, London. She soon left King's College on an Open Exhibition scholarship to Somerville College, Oxford. The scholarship was in English Literature, but on arriving at Oxford, Nott switched to Philosophy, Politics and Economics (PPE) in which she took a IVth in 1929.

It was at Oxford that she met Christopher Bailey, an electronics and computer engineer, whom she was to marry in 1929. During the 1930s, Nott was a social worker and psychologist in the East End of London, an experience which would inspire her first novel, Mile End (1938), which is set in the area. Bailey's work took the couple to the Netherlands, from which they escaped when the German army invaded in 1940.

During the war, Nott and Bailey lived in Bournemouth, and afterwards they moved to Sweden. Their marriage was dissolved in the 1950s. They had no children.

It was her book The Emperor's Clothes (1953), which drew Nott to the attention of a much wider audience. An atheist, Nott attacked what she described as the "neo-scholasticism" of such dominant religious literary figures as T.S. Eliot and C.S. Lewis.

In 1954, Nott began to contribute book reviews to The Observer; much of her critical work would appear in that newspaper. Essays and reviews by Nott were also published by Encounter, Partisan Review, The Nation, The Listener, New Society, Commentary, The Times and The Spectator. Nott's last review for The Observer was published in 1986. She also wrote extensively for the humanist and rationalist movement, and many of her articles were published in the Rationalist Annual, Question, and Humanist. She also translated books and articles.

In the early 1970s, Nott moved to Horsham, where she lived with a friend. Later in the decade she moved in with one of her sisters in Thornton Heath.

Nott was a member of the University Women's Club and the Society of Authors. In Who's Who she listed her recreations as playing the piano and gardening. She was elected a fellow of the Royal Society of Literature in 1977.

Nott suffered from deafness and Parkinson's disease in her later years. When she died, Nott was living at Wemyss Lodge Residential Home in Swindon, Wiltshire.

== Critical reception ==
Mile End (1938), Nott's first novel, was reviewed by the Times Literary Supplement. The reviewer felt that there was "something a shade clinical, a trifle too scientifically tolerant or indulgent, in the view of humanity unfolded here", and found Nott's prose "sharply individual but perhaps a little too mannered in its intellectual precision." Nevertheless, "she gives the impression of having entered with astonishing acuteness and subtlety of mind into the impulses of the Jewish temperament, the psychological sway of Jewish religious lore and messianic tradition, the alien intensities of the social and domestic mood of the ghetto." The reviewer concluded that it was "an admirably balanced story, which gains in narrative force and even in warmth as it advances."

Nott's debut collection of poetry, Landscapes and Departures (1947) received a positive review in the Times Literary Supplement. The reviewer said that although Nott was a "difficult poet", her "quality as a writer is immediately obvious", concluding that "In spite of the difficulty of her poems, Miss Nott deserves to be read. She has a rich, harsh and rather masculine talent, and every poem here is full of vigour."

== PEN ==
Nott became involved in the writers' organisation PEN in the 1950s, becoming editor (initially acting editor) of the organisation's journal, PEN Bulletin of Selected Books (later renamed PEN International), in 1960. She held the post until 1988.

She was briefly President of PEN in 1975, staying on as a vice-president until the end of her life.

== Humanism and rationalism ==
Nott was a committed humanist and rationalist, as signalled by the publication of her controversial The Emperor's New Clothes (1953), Writing on the occasion of Nott's death, a National Secular Society's former general secretary, Colin McCall, explained the significance of the book:

You need to realise the literary situation in post-war Britain to appreciate the importance of Kathleen Nott... This was a time when T.S. Eliot reigned supreme, not only as poet, but as critic; when Graham Greene, C.S. Lewis and Dorothy L. Sayers were, in their different ways, spreading dogmatic Christian orthodoxy; and when the Times Literary Supplement (January 22, 1954) said the acceptance of authority in matters of religious belief "is now once more an important constituent in European letters". It was the philosophical inadequacies of this "constituent" that Kathleen Nott had exposed in The Emperor's New Clothes...

Nott contributed chapters to H.J. Blackham's collection of essays, Objections to Humanism (1963) (a humanist response to Objections to Christianity from the same publishers), and The Humanist Outlook (1968), edited by A.J. Ayer. In "Is Rationalism Sterile?", Nott wrote:

To be too analytical, to demand explanations, reasons, and logical or moral justifications can, we know, destroy human trust and therefore human relations... Safeguarding, the longing for final reassurance characterises all of us, rationalists and religious alike, and the prestige of objective truth is only an intellectual parallel... It seems to me that the 'theologians' on either side of the rationalist-supernaturalist controversy have become mere case-makers, primarily out for proofs. (Natural enough, no doubt, but meanwhile the riches of feeling, religious or human, have been flung out with the bath-water.) It looks as if some kinds of argument, whatever they appear to be about, can indeed be largely sterile because they are not really aimed at finding a synthesis, a solution, at making peace. They belong to a side, they are covert polemic, and they aim at victory. With warfare of all kinds, truth is indeed the first victim.

For Nott, rationalism "in the nineteenth-century dyed-in-the-wool sense of being almost wholly preoccupied with the question of the existence of God, and with rebutting any supernatural sanction for morality", is "sterile".

However, "I do not think that humanists have to be rationalists in the old sense.".

In "Humanism and the Arts", Nott wrote that "humanists of our time are not as strong as they should be on the meaning and value of art and the artist." She also admitted that "as soon as I begin to write about Humanism or speak from a Humanist platform I find myself in full retreat towards square nought. If someone does not ask me what or who is a humanist – I find I am asking myself – or the audience." Returning to the theme of "Is Rationalism Sterile", Nott observes:

Many humanists seem to be just non-Godists. All they seriously worry about is the mid-Victorian controversy and it is here that they seem irremovably stuck... the large mass of contemporary literature has made at least one thing clear: that on the subject of God's existence and of the supernatural there is no longer any possibility of reasoned communication.

Instead, Nott advocated that humanists should examine "the real possibilities of the real concrete human being." She continued:

The job for the humanist is to try and extract the human values of religion, to separate them out from the theological languages in which they disguise themselves.

Nott was President of the Progressive League (1959–1961), and an honorary associate of the Rationalist Press Association, from 1979 until she died in 1999.

== Writings ==
=== Philosophy ===
- The Emperor's Clothes: an attack on the dogmatic orthodoxy of T.S. Eliot, Graham Greene, Dorothy Sayers, C.S. Lewis, and others. (1953). London: Heinemann.
- A Soul in the Quad (1969)
- Philosophy and Human Nature (1971)
- The Good Want Power: an essay in the psychological possibilities of liberalism (1977)

=== Novels ===
- Mile End (1938)
- The Dry Deluge (1947)
- Private Fires (1960)
- An Elderly Retired Man (1963)

=== Poetry ===
- Landscapes and Departures (1947)
- Poems from the North (1956)
- Creatures and Emblems (1960)
- Elegies, and other poems (1981)

=== Criticism ===
- A Clean, Well-Lighted Place: a private view of Sweden (1961)

=== Articles and book chapters ===
- "Is rationalism sterile?" (1963) in Blackham, H.J. (ed.) Objections to Humanism. Harmondsworth: Penguin, 1964, pp. 55–78.
- "Mortal Statistics" (1964), Commentary, October. Available online (subscription required)
- "The Act of Creation by Arthur Koestler" [book review] (1964), Commentary, November. Available online (subscription required)
- "Koestler and his critics" (1968), Encounter, Vol. 30 (2), pp. 76–81.
- "Humanism and the Arts" (1968). in Ayer, A.J. (ed.) The Humanist Outlook, London: Pemberton/Barrie and Rockliff, pp. 177–185.
- "Ideology and moral reality" (1985). New Humanist, Vol. 100 (4), Autumn, pp. 18–20.

=== Translations ===
- Chauvet, Lucien (1948). North-Westerly Gale.
- Bacchelli, Riccardo (1956). Son of Stalin.

== Bibliography ==
- [Anon] (1999). Obituary of Kathleen Nott, The Times, 24 February.
- Cooke, Bill (2003). The Blasphemy Depot: a hundred years of the Rationalist Press Association. London: RPA. ISBN 0-301-00302-5.
- King, Francis. (1999). Obituary of Kathleen Nott, The Independent, 11 March
- McCall, Colin (1999). "Kathleen Nott (1905–1999)" ["Down to Earth"]. The Freethinker, Vol. 119 (4), April, p. 10.
- Paterson, Elizabeth (1999). "A voice against the tides of fashion" [Obituary of Kathleen Nott], The Guardian, 23 February, p. 16.
