= Julius Springer =

German book publisher (1817–1877)

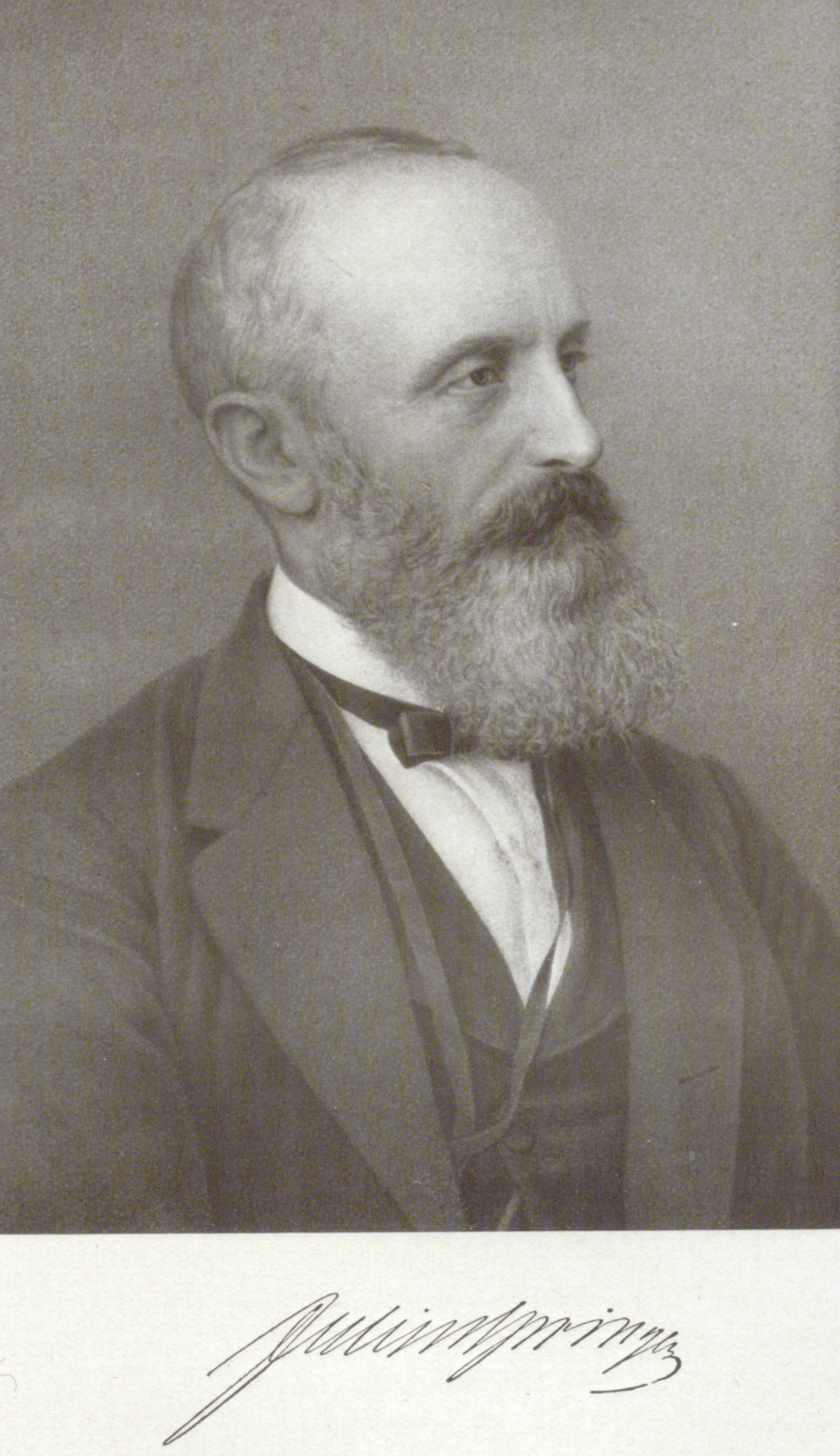
- Born: 10 May 1817 Berlin, Kingdom of Prussia
- Died: 17 April 1877 (aged 59) Berlin, German Empire
- Occupation: Publisher

Julius Springer (10 May 1817 – 17 April 1877) was a German publisher who founded the academic publishing house Springer Science+Business Media (formerly known as Springer-Verlag).

== Springer-Verlag ==
In 1842, Springer founded the retail bookshop Springer in Berlin at the address Breite Strasse 20 (now No. 11). Springer and his son Ferdinand built it from a small firm of 4 employees into the world's second largest academic publisher. Springer's book business later became Springer-Verlag and then Springer Science+Business Media which, in 2021, was one of the largest and most prominent academic publishers in the world.

== Life ==
In 1848 he took part in the side of the insurgents in action against the authorities. Springer was from 1867 to 1873 president of the German Booksellers and Publishers Association. From 1869 until his death, Springer was a member of the Berlin city assembly. In addition, he was one of the pioneers of national and international copyright law.

Julius Springer bore no relation to the 20th century publisher Axel Springer.

== Plaque ==
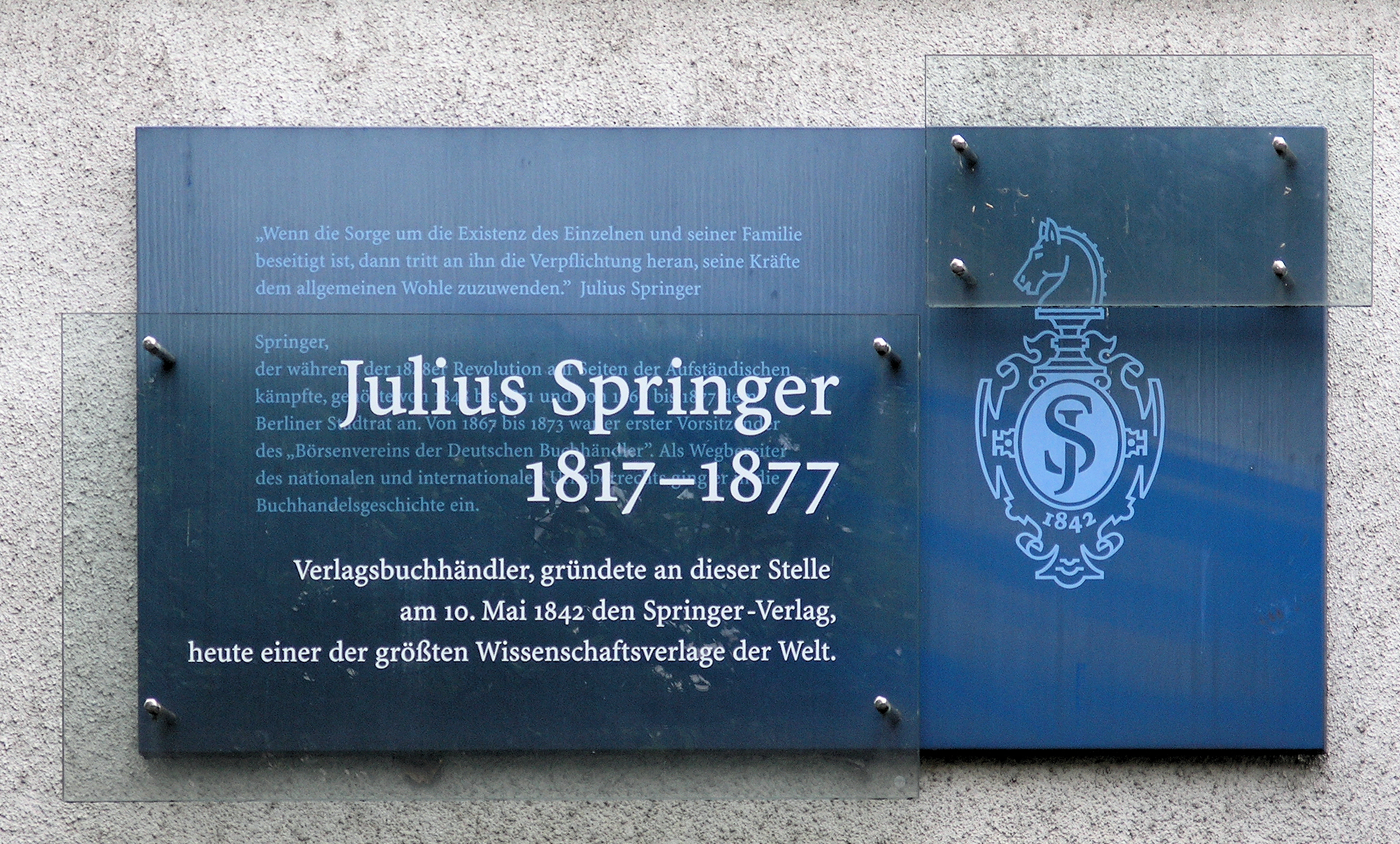
Plaque at Breite Straße 11 in Berlin-Mitte

The text of the plaque at Breite Straße 11 in Berlin-Mitte reads:

Julius Springer
1817 – 1877
Verlagsbuchhändler, gründete an dieser Stelle
am 10. Mai 1842 den Springer Verlag,
heute einer der größten Wissenschaftsverlage der Welt.

(Julius Springer, 1817–1877, publisher, founded here on 10 May 1842 Springer-Verlag, today one of the biggest scientific publishing houses in the world.)
