= Between Past and Future =

1961 philosophy book by Hannah Arendt

- 2006 edition
- Author: Hannah Arendt
- Language: English
- Subject: Political theory
- Published: 1961
- Publisher: The Viking Press
- Publication place: United States

Between Past and Future is a book written by the German-born Jewish American political theorist, Hannah Arendt, and first published in 1961, dealing with eight topics in political thinking.

== History ==
Between Past and Future was published for the first time in 1961 by The Viking Press in the United States and by Faber and Faber in Great Britain. The first edition consisted of six essays, and two more were added to a 1968 revision. The book is a collection of various essays written between 1954 and 1968. The final version of the book includes essays dealing with different philosophical subjects including freedom, education, authority, tradition, history and politics. The subtitle of the final version is Eight Exercises in Political Thought.

== Structure and content ==
The book consists of a preface and eight essays: "Tradition and the Modern Age", "The Concept of History: Ancient and Modern", "What Is Authority?", "What Is Freedom?", "The Crisis in Education" and "The Crisis in Culture: Its social and political influence", "Truth and Politics" and "The Conquest of Space and the Stature of Man".

All of the essays share a central idea. Humans are living between the past and the uncertain future. They must permanently think to exist, and each man is required to learn thinking. For a long time humans have resorted to tradition, but in modern times, this tradition has been abandoned, there is no more respect for tradition and culture. With her essays, Hannah Arendt tries to find solutions to help humans think again today. According to her, there is no way to live again with tradition, and modern philosophy has not succeeded in helping humans to live correctly.

=== Preface ===
The title of the preface is The Gap between Past and Future. The first sentence of the preface is a citation of French poet and résistant René Char: "Notre héritage n'est précédé d'aucun testament," translated by Arendt herself as "our inheritance was left to us by no testament." For Arendt, this sentence perfectly illustrates the situation in which European peoples are left after the Second World War. It also illustrates the crisis in culture–the main subject of the sixth essay. Indeed, the absence of testament means the current breaking-off with tradition.

To characterize the way writers, men of letters and thinkers had lived the period of the French Résistance, Hannah Arendt speaks of a "treasure." Indeed, René Char had stated during this period: "If I survive, I know that I have to break with the aroma of these essential years, silently reject my treasure." This treasure is the experience of freedom all intellectuals made during this unique period, when they left their traditional occupation, that is a life focused on their personal affairs and the quest of themselves. With the Resistance, these men had at last found themselves, they had discovered what is freedom. But with the Liberation, they had lost their treasure, in other words they had either to return to their past occupations or to be involved again in public life but defending ideologies and engaging themselves into endless polemics, which had nothing to do with the time of the Resistance movement.

The example of the French Resistance is one of the several historical experiences in which a treasure appears and then disappears. It was the case with the revolutions of 1776 in the United States, 1789 and 1871 in France, 1917 in Russia, 1918-1919 in Germany, 1956 in Budapest. Although this treasure has no name, it was called public happiness in the United States in the eighteenth century. Any time this treasure appeared, it did not remain, not because of historical events nor chance, "but because no tradition had foreseen its appearance," no tradition or no "testament" had been able to announce the coming and the reality of this treasure. Indeed, tradition is what "selects and names, (...) hands down and preserves, (...) indicates where the treasures are and what their worth is."

=== Analysis of the history of Western philosophy ===
According to Arendt, the origins of European philosophical thinking date back to Ancient Greece, with Aristotle and Plato. Plato had taught us that the truth was not present within the society and in public affairs, but in eternal ideas, as demonstrated in the allegory of the cave. On the contrary, Marx thought that the "truth is not outside the affairs of men and their common world but precisely in them." The end of Platonic and Aristotelian tradition of philosophy came with Marx, according to whom the philosopher had to turn away from philosophy in order to be involved in society and human affairs in order to change the world.

For Arendt, Marxist philosophy considers that man creates himself, that his humanity is the result of his own activity, and that what distinguishes man from animal is not reason but labor. Thus Marx challenges the traditional praise of reason. Moreover, for Marx violence is the leading force that determines human relations, while for the traditional thought it is the most disgraceful of human actions and the symbol of tyranny.

To Marx, violence or rather the possession of the means of violence is the constituent element of all forms of government; the state is the instrument of the ruling class by means of which it oppresses and exploits, and the whole sphere of political action is characterized by the use of violence. The Marxian identification of violence with action implies another fundamental challenge of tradition.

Marx's own attitude to the tradition of political thought was one of conscious rebellion. Crucial among [certain key statements containing his political philosophy] are the following: "Labor created man". "Violence is the midwife of every old society pregnant with a new one", hence: violence is the midwife of history. Finally, there is the famous last thesis on Feuerbach: "The philosophers have only interpreted the world differently; the point is, however, to change it", which, in the light of Marx's thought, one could render more adequately as: The philosophers have interpreted the world long enough; the time has come to change it. For this last statement is in fact only a variation of another: "You cannot aufheben philosophy without realizing it".

=== Truth and Politics ===
In the penultimate essay of the collection, entitled Truth and Politics, Arendt addresses a series of questions that seem essential to understanding the contemporary political reality.

Lies have always been considered necessary and legitimate tools not only for politicians or demagogues, but also for statesmen. Arendt wonders what does this mean, on the one hand, for the nature and dignity of the political realm and, on the other hand, for the nature and dignity of truth and sincerity. Arendt also wonders if it belongs to the very essence of truth to be powerless and to the essence of power to be deceptive. Furthermore, an inescapable problem is the kind of reality possessed by truth if it were to lack all power in the public sphere, which, more than any other sphere of human life, guarantees the reality of existence to men who are mortal, and aware of that. Finally, an atrocious doubt: wouldn't impotent truth be just as contemptible as power that does not listen to the truth.

What appears really alarming to Arendt is that in free countries, to the extent that unwelcome factual truths are tolerated, they are often, consciously or unconsciously, transformed into opinions; as if facts such as Germany's support for Hitler or the collapse of France to the German army in 1940 or Vatican policy during World War II were not documented historical facts but matters of opinion. While being aware of the debate around Nietzsche's statement that "there are no facts, only interpretations", according to Arendt these and very many other difficulties inherent in the historical sciences are real, but they must not constitute an argument against the existence of factual matter, nor can they serve as a justification for blurring the lines between a fact and an interpretation, or serve the historian as an excuse to manipulate the facts as he pleases. For Arendt the hallmark of factual truth is that its opposite is neither error nor illusion nor opinion, but deliberate falsehood. Of course, error in reference to factual truth is possible and even common; if so, this kind of truth is in no way different from scientific or rational truth. But the essential point is that, as far as the facts are concerned, there is another alternative, and that this alternative, deliberate falsehood, is not of the same species as propositions which, whether right or wrong, mean only what is, or how something that is appears to me. A factual statement, such as German invasion of Belgium in August 1914, for example, acquires political implications only if it is placed in an interpretive context. The blurring of the line that separates factual truth from opinion belongs to the many forms that lying can take, all of which are forms of action. While the liar is a man of action, whoever tells the truth, whether rational or factual, is never so.

As to the difference between the traditional political lie and the modern mass manipulation of fact and opinion – as has become evident in the rewriting of history, the fabrication of images – and actual government policy, for Arendt the former concerned mostly real secrets, data which had never been made public. In contrast, modern political lies effectively deal with things that are by no means secrets, but are known to virtually everyone. This is evident in the case of rewriting contemporary history under the eyes of those who witnessed it, but it is equally true in the case of image-making of all sorts, in which, again, every known and established fact can be denied or neglected if it is likely to damage the image; an image, in fact, unlike an old-fashioned portrait, is not made simply to improve reality, but to offer a complete substitute for it. And this replacement, due to modern techniques and mass media, is of course much more in the public eye than the original ever was. We are thus faced with highly respected statesmen, such as de Gaulle and Adenauer, who were able to build their basic policies on obvious "non-facts", such as the "fact" that France was one of the winners of World War II, and therefore is one of the great powers, and Adenauer's statement that "the barbarism of National Socialism had affected only a relatively small percentage of the country." All these lies, according to Arendt, whether their authors know it or not, contain an element of violence; organized lying always tends to destroy what it has decided to deny, even if only totalitarian governments have consciously adopted lying as a first step towards murder.

=== The Conquest of Space and the Stature of Man ===
In the last essay of the book Arendt addresses the possible effects of the conquest of space, and more generally of the developments of modern scientific research, on the humanist vision of the world. According to Arendt, the new understanding of physical reality seems to require not only the renunciation of an anthropocentric or geocentric vision of the world, but also a radical elimination of all anthropomorphic elements and principles deriving both from the world given to man's five senses and from the categories inherent in the human mind. To the scientist man is but a particular case of organic life, and man's habitat is but a particular limiting case of absolute universal laws, i.e. laws governing the immensity of the universe. It has been the glory of modern science to have been able to free itself completely from such anthropocentric, that is, truly humanistic, concerns. For Arendt, the progress of modern science has demonstrated very forcefully how far this observed universe, the infinitely small as well as the infinitely large, escapes not only the grossness of human sensory perception, but also the most ingenious instruments that have been constructed for its refinement. The data that modern physics research deals with appear as "mysterious messengers from the real world".

== Bibliography ==
- Arendt, Hannah (2006) [1961]. Between Past and Future. Penguin Publishing Group. ISBN 1-101-66265-4. (Original publisher: New York: Viking)
- Passerin d'Entreves, Maurizio (2019). "Hannah Arendt". Stanford Encyclopedia of Philosophy Archive. Stanford University. (Revision as of May 2018)
- Yar, Majid. "Hannah Arendt (1906—1975)". Internet Encyclopedia of Philosophy.
