= The Human Condition (Arendt book) =

1958 philosophy book by Hannah Arendt

- First edition
- Author: Hannah Arendt
- Subject: Political theory
- Published: 1958
- Publisher: University of Chicago Press
- Publication place: United States

The Human Condition is a book by Hannah Arendt, published in 1958. It is Arendt's account of how "human activities" should be—and have been—understood throughout Western history.

Arendt reevaluates the modern relevance of the vita activa (active life), in contrast with the vita contemplativa (contemplative life), which was esteemed in older philosophy. She airs her concerns that the debate over the relative status of the two has blinded us to important insights about the vita activa and how it has changed since ancient times. She distinguishes three sorts of activity—labor, work, and action—and discusses how they have been affected by changes in Western history.

== History ==
The Human Condition was first published in 1958. A second edition, with an introduction by Margaret Canovan, was issued in 1998. The work consists of a prologue and six parts.

== Structure ==
=== I – The Human Condition ===
Arendt introduces the term vita activa (active life) by distinguishing it from vita contemplativa (contemplative life). Ancient philosophers insisted upon the superiority of the vita contemplativa, for which the vita activa merely provided necessities. Karl Marx flipped the hierarchy, claiming that the vita contemplativa is merely a superstructure on the fundamental basic life-processes of a society. Arendt's thesis is that the concerns of the vita activa are neither superior nor inferior to those of the vita contemplativa, nor are they the same. The vita activa may be divided into three sorts of activities: labor, work and action.

=== II – The Public and the Private Realm ===
According to Arendt, ancient Greek life was divided between two realms: the public realm in which "action" was performed, and the private realm, site of the household ruled by its head. The mark of the private was not intimacy, as it is in modern times, but biological necessity. In the private realm, heads of households took care of needs for food, shelter, and sex. By contrast, the public realm was a realm of freedom from these biological necessities, a realm in which one could distinguish oneself through "great words and great deeds." Property requirements for citizenship reflected the understanding that unless one was able to take care of one's biological necessities, one could not be free from them and hence could not participate in the public realm as a free person among equals. Slaves and subordinated women were confined to the private realm where they met the biological necessities of the head of the household. The public realm naturally was accorded higher status than the private.

With the fall of the Roman Empire, the church took over the role of the public realm (though its otherworldly orientation gave it a character distinct from the previous public realm), and the feudal lords ran their lands and holdings as private realms. The modern period saw the rise of a third realm, the social realm. The social realm is concerned with providing for biological needs, but it does so at the level of the state. Arendt views the social realm as a threat to both the private and the public realm. In order to provide for the needs of everyone, it must invade the private sphere, and because it makes biological needs a public matter, it corrupts the realm of free action: There is no longer a realm free from necessity.

=== III – Labor ===
Arendt claims that her distinction between labor and work has been disregarded by philosophers throughout history even though it has been preserved in many European languages. To her labor is human activity directed at meeting biological (and perhaps other) necessities for self-preservation and the reproduction of the species. These needs cannot be satisfied once and for all. Thus labor never really reaches an end. Its fruits do not persist; they are quickly consumed, and more must always be produced.

Labor is thus a cyclical, repeated process that carries with it a sense of futility.

In the ancient world, Arendt asserts, labor was contemptible not because it was what slaves did; rather, slaves were contemptible because they performed labor, a futile but necessary activity. In the modern world, not just slaves, but everyone has come to be defined by their labor: We are job-holders, and we must perform our jobs to meet our needs.

Marx registers this modern idea in his assertion that man is animal laborans, a species that sets itself apart from the animals not by its thinking, but by its labor. But Marx then contradicts himself in foreseeing a day when production allows the proletariat to throw off the shackles of their oppressors and be free from labor entirely. By Marx's own lights, this would mean workers cease to be human. Arendt worries that if automation were to allow us to free ourselves from labor, freedom would become meaningless to us since lacking the contrast with futile necessity that labor provides. Because we define ourselves as job-holders and have relegated everything outside of labor to the category of play and mere hobbies, our lives would become trivial to us without labor.

Meanwhile, advances in production and the transformation of work into labor means that many things that were once felt to be lasting works are now mere disposable objects of consumption. "The solution…consists in treating all use objects as though they were consumer goods, so that a chair or a table is now consumed as rapidly as a dress and a dress used up almost as quickly as food."

=== IV – Work ===
Work, unlike labor, has a clearly defined beginning and end. It leaves behind a durable object, such as a tool, rather than an object for consumption. These durable objects become part of the world we live in.

Work involves an element of violation or violence in which the worker interrupts nature in order to obtain and shape raw materials. For example, a tree is cut down to obtain wood, or the earth is mined to obtain metals.

Work comprises the whole process, from the original idea for the object, to the obtaining of raw materials, to the finished product. The process of work is determined by the categories of means and end. For Arendt, thinking of ourselves primarily as workers leads to a sort of instrumental reasoning in which it is natural to think of everything as a potential means to some further end. Kant's claim that humanity is an end in itself shows just how much this instrumental conception of reason has dominated our thinking. Utilitarianism, Arendt claims, is based on a failure to distinguish between "in order to" and "for the sake of."

The homo faber mentality is further evident with the "confusion" in modern political economy when the ancient word "worth", still present in Locke, was replaced by Marx with "use value", as distinct from "exchange value". Marx also thought that the prevalence of the latter over the former constituted the original sin of capitalism. The substitution of talk about "use value" for "worth" in economic discourse, marks the beginning of the disappearance of a notion of a kind of worth that is intrinsic. This contrasts with value per se, which is the quality that a thing can never possess regardless of its relations to others, and therefore depends on "market value". Although use objects are good examples of the products of work, artworks are perhaps the best examples, since they have the greatest durability of all objects. Since they are never used for anything (least of all labor), they don't get worn down.

=== V – Action ===
"Human plurality, the basic condition of both action and speech, has the twofold character of equality and distinction. If men were not equal, they could neither understand each other, nor understand their predecessors, nor make plans for the future and foresee the needs of their successors". This third type of activity, action (which includes both speech and activity), is the means by which humans disclose themselves to others, not that action is always consciously guiding such disclosure. Indeed, the self revealed in action is more than likely concealed from the person acting, revealed only in the story of her action.

Such stories can be recorded in documents or monuments and be visible in everyday objects and works of art. But the stories told are very different from these "reifications", because they "tell us more about their subjects, the "hero" at the center of each story, than any product of human hands ever tells us about the master who produced it".

Action is the means by which we distinguish ourselves from others as unique and unexchangeable beings. With humans, unlike with other beings, there is not just a generic question of what we are, but of who each is individually.

Action and speech are always between humans and directed toward them, and it generates human relationships. Diversity among humans that see the action makes possible a sort of objectivity by letting an action be witnessed from different perspectives.

Action has boundless consequences, often going far beyond what we could anticipate. The Greeks thought of the polis as a place where free people could live together so as to act, and philosophers like Plato, disliking action's unpredictability, modeled the ideal polis on the household. In it, the philosopher king produces the lasting work of legislation, and the people labor under him.

Against attempts to replace action with work and labor, Arendt offers two solutions to the two greatest problems action poses: forgiveness, to temper action's irreversibility, and promises, to mitigate its unpredictability: "Without being bound to the fulfillment of promises, we would never be able to keep our identities; we would be condemned to wander helplessly and without direction in the darkness of each man's lonely heart".

=== VI – The Vita Activa and the Modern Age ===
Arendt thinks that three great events determined the character of the modern age: "the discovery of America and the ensuing exploration of the whole earth; the Reformation, which by expropriating ecclesiastical and monastic possessions started the two-fold process of individual expropriation and the accumulation of social wealth; the invention of the telescope and the development of a new science that considers the nature of the earth from the viewpoint of the universe."

None of these events could have been foreseen. They happened suddenly and had repercussions their instigators never intended. One effect of each of these events has been to increase our alienation from the world, which Arendt holds far more characteristic of our age than alienation from the self (as Marx thought). The shrinking distances brought about by exploration and transportation technology make humans more inhabitants of the whole Earth than of their particular places within it.

The process of expropriation precipitated by the Reformation wrested people from their land and place in the world. Galileo's discovery of the continuity between the Earth and the universe further alienates people from their world. It showed that, inasfar as the Sun does not rise and set as it appears to, an Earth-centered view of it that world is illusory.

What has set Galileo apart from other heliocentric theorists is that he proved heliocentric theories useful as instruments not merely for predicting or explaining data, but for proper descriptions of reality. Ironically, as an outcome of the scientific revolution, current theories have become so bizarre that perhaps no one can grasp the world they describe. They have turned out to be useful primarily as instruments, after having shattered our previous understanding of that world.

Meanwhile, science now further alienates humans from the world by unleashing processes on Earth that previously occurred only further out in the universe. Humans may have found an Archimedean point to move the world, but only by losing their place in it. The consequence of this world alienation for philosophy has been an intense focus on the self, the one remaining sphere of certainty and knowledge. The world described by science cannot be known, or not with certainty, but the self, Descartes and other moderns thought, could be known. Though his "cogito, ergo sum" was anticipated by Augustine, his "dubito ergo sum" (De libero arbitrio, Chapter III) — beginning from actual doubt — is original and a hallmark of modernity.

The notion of common sense as a faculty into which the other five were fitted towards a common world ceded to a conception of common sense as an inner faculty with no relationship to the world. The assumption that all humans had faculties like this in common became a necessary impetus to more theories, but without the premise of a common world, the assumption of faculties in common has lost some warrant. Galileo's discoveries also have implications for the "vita activa" and "vita contemplativa". That he made his discoveries with a telescope, a product of human work, signals an important change in science. Knowledge is acquired not just by reflection, but by making. Homo faber and the life of work were thus exalted over the life of contemplation.

Indeed, the model of scientific inquiry, the experiment, is one in which the scientist unleashes a process through which she produces results. This way of doing science is naturally understood in terms of work processes. The philosopher has consequently sunken to a position of less significance, merely puzzling over what scientists have shown.

Arendt argues that, in the end, homo faber ceded primacy to animal laborans. She attributes the centrality of the life of labor to the fact that these developments occurred within Christian societies, which she argues valued life more highly than other societies had. With secularization, she contends, this residual valuation of life came to dominate modern activity, producing what she describes as a society of laborers.

Judged by the historical significance of what they do, the people most capable of action now are perhaps scientists. Unfortunately, though, they act into nature and not human relationships. Thus their action cannot be the source of the meaningfulness that illuminates human existence.

Action is still possible in free societies, but fragile.

== Criticisms ==
According to Maurizio Passerin d'Entreves, in Arendt there would be two conflicting conceptions of nature: On the one hand, with the advent of industrialization and capitalism, human beings increasingly lose their subjectivity to become mere elements of nature who are exclusively interested in their own survival and in the production of perishable objects; on the other hand, it is nature that is subjugated by man, who seeks more and more to replace it with artificial objects resulting from technology, and through laboratory experiments they even try to modify the very nature of man and to extend their dominion over nature in space and time. "The modern world would thus appear to be too natural and too artificial, too much under the dominance of labor and the life-process of the species, as well as too much under the dominance of techne".

According to Byung-Chul Han, The Human Condition neglects an essential dimension of human existence, that of contemplation:

Arendt's absolutization of action deprives life of any festivity. The feast is the expression of an abundant life, an intensive form of life. In the feast, life refers to itself, rather than pursuing goals outside of oneself. It puts work and action out of play... It is not the determination to act, but the abandonment of the feast that elevates us above simple life, which would only be survival. Life, reduced to being active, is lethal. Until the end, Arendt was unaware that precisely the loss of the contemplative capacity leads to the victory, that she herself criticized, of the "animal laborans", which subjects all human activities to work... Life active degenerates into hyperactivity and ends in burnout, not only of the psyche, but also of the entire planet.
