= Nizhny Shaksher =

Nizhny Shaksher Нижний Шакшер
- Selo
- Location within Perm Krai Location within Russia
- Coordinates: 59°58′N 56°16′E
- Country: Russia
- Region: Perm Krai
- District: Cherdynsky District
- Time zone: UTC+5:00

Nizhny Shaksher (Russian: Нижний Шакшер) is a rural locality (a selo) in Cherdynsky District, Perm Krai, Russia. The population was 47 as of 2010. There are 2 streets.

== Geography ==
Nizhny Shaksher is located 100 km southwest of Cherdyn (the district's administrative centre) by road. Bayandina is the nearest rural locality.
