= Mandelstam =

Mandelstam or Mandelshtam (Russian: Мандельштам) is a Jewish surname which may refer to:

- Leonid Mandelstam (1879–1944), Russian theoretical physicist
  - Mandel'shtam (crater), lunar crater named for Leonid Mandelstam
- Nadezhda Mandelstam (1899–1980), Russian writer, wife of Osip Mandelstam
- Osip Mandelstam (1891–1938), Russian poet
- Leon Mandelshtam (1819 – 1889), Russian poet and translator
- Rod Mandelstam (born 1942), South African-born tennis player
- Stanley Mandelstam (1928–2016), South African-born particle physicist
  - Mandelstam variables, relativistically invariant representation for particle scattering, introduced by Stanley Mandelstam
