= Marusheva =

Marusheva Марушева
- Village
- Location within Perm Krai Location within Russia
- Coordinates: 60°46′N 56°44′E
- Country: Russia
- Region: Perm Krai
- District: Cherdynsky District
- Time zone: UTC+5:00

Marusheva (Russian: Марушева) is a rural locality (a village) in Cherdynsky District, Perm Krai, Russia. The population was 23 as of 2010.

== Geography ==
Marusheva is located 51 km northeast of Cherdyn (the district's administrative centre) by road. Rozhnevo is the nearest rural locality.
