= Nizhneye Kerchevo =

Nizhneye Kerchevo Нижнее Керчево
- Village
- Location within Perm Krai Location within Russia
- Coordinates: 59°55′57″N 56°19′28″E
- Country: Russia
- Region: Perm Krai
- District: Cherdynsky District
- Time zone: UTC+5:00

Nizhneye Kerchevo (Russian: Нижнее Керчево) is a rural locality (a village) in Cherdynsky District, Perm Krai, Russia. The population was 99 as of 2010. There are 5 streets.

== Geography ==
Nizhneye Kerchevo is located 94 km southwest of Cherdyn (the district's administrative centre) by road. Kerchevsky is the nearest rural locality.
