= Buldyrya =

Buldyrya Бондюг
- Settlement
- Location within Perm Krai Location within Russia
- Coordinates: 60°58′N 57°14′E
- Country: Russia
- Region: Perm Krai
- District: Cherdynsky District
- Time zone: UTC+5:00

Buldyrya (Russian: Булдырья) is a rural locality (a settlement) in Cherdynsky District, Perm Krai, Russia. The population was 111 as of 2010. There are 6 streets.

== Geography ==
Buldyrya is located 94 km northeast of Cherdyn (the district's administrative centre) by road. Berezovo is the nearest rural locality.
