= Ambor =

Ambor Амбор
- Village
- Location within Perm Krai Location within Russia
- Coordinates: 60°14′N 56°11′E
- Country: Russia
- Region: Perm Krai
- District: Cherdynsky District
- Time zone: UTC+5:00

Ambor (Russian: Амбор) is a rural locality (a village) in Cherdynsky District, Perm Krai, Russia. The population was 40 as of 2010. There are 3 streets.

== Geography ==
Ambor is located 55 km southwest of Cherdyn (the district's administrative centre) by road. Pechinki is the nearest rural locality.
