= Cherdynsky =

Cherdynsky (masculine), Cherdynskaya (feminine), or Cherdynskoye (neuter) may refer to:

- Cherdynsky District, a district of Perm Krai, Russia
- Cherdynskoye Urban Settlement, a municipal formation which the town of Cherdyn in Cherdynsky District of Perm Krai, Russia is incorporated as
