= Pilva =

Pilva Пильва
- Settlement
- Location within Perm Krai Location within Russia
- Coordinates: 60°49′N 56°00′E
- Country: Russia
- Region: Perm Krai
- District: Cherdynsky District
- Time zone: UTC+5:00

Pilva (Russian: Пильва) is a rural locality (a settlement) in Cherdynsky District, Perm Krai, Russia. The population was 383 as of 2010. There are 11 streets.

== Geography ==
Pilva is located 60 km north of Cherdyn (the district's administrative centre) by road. Kupchik is the nearest rural locality.
