= Kolchug =

Kolchug Кольчуг
- Selo
- Location within Perm Krai Location within Russia
- Coordinates: 60°24′N 56°09′E
- Country: Russia
- Region: Perm Krai
- District: Cherdynsky District
- Time zone: UTC+5:00

Kolchug (Russian: Кольчуг) is a rural locality (a selo) in Cherdynsky District, Perm Krai, Russia. The population was 223 as of 2010. There are 7 streets.

== Geography ==
Kolchug is located 19 km west of Cherdyn (the district's administrative centre) by road. Kushmangort is the nearest rural locality.
