= Kornino =

Kornino Корнино
- Selo
- Location within Perm Krai Location within Russia
- Coordinates: 60°20′N 56°13′E
- Country: Russia
- Region: Perm Krai
- District: Cherdynsky District
- Time zone: UTC+5:00

Kornino (Russian: Корнино) is a rural locality (a selo) in Cherdynsky District, Perm Krai, Russia. The population was 81 as of 2010. There are 4 streets.

== Geography ==
Kornino is located 28 km southwest of Cherdyn (the district's administrative centre) by road. Ural is the nearest rural locality.
