= Bolshoy Kikus =

Bolshoy Kikus Большой Кикус
- Selo
- Location within Perm Krai Location within Russia
- Coordinates: 60°54′N 57°00′E
- Country: Russia
- Region: Perm Krai
- District: Cherdynsky District
- Time zone: UTC+5:00

Bolshoy Kikus (Russian: Большой Кикус) is a rural locality (a selo) in Cherdynsky District, Perm Krai, Russia. The population was 8 as of 2010. There are 3 streets.

== Geography ==
Bolshoy Kikus is located 76 km northeast of Cherdyn (the district's administrative centre) by road. Maly Kikus is the nearest rural locality.
