= Bolshiye Doldy =

Bolshiye Doldy Большие Долды
- Selo
- Location within Perm Krai Location within Russia
- Coordinates: 60°16′N 56°07′E
- Country: Russia
- Region: Perm Krai
- District: Cherdynsky District

Population (2010)
  - Total: 150
- Time zone: UTC+5:00

Bolshiye Doldy (Russian: Большие Долды) is a rural locality (a selo) in Cherdynsky District, Perm Krai, Russia. The population was 150 as of 2010. There are 4 streets.

== Geography ==
Bolshiye Doldy is located 142 km southwest of Cherdyn (the district's administrative centre) by road. Malye Doldy is the nearest rural locality.
