= Pokcha =

Pokcha (Russian: Покча) is the name of several rural localities in Russia:

- Pokcha, Komi Republic, a selo in Troitsko-Pechorsky District of the Komi Republic
- Pokcha, Perm Krai, a selo in Cherdynsky District of Perm Krai
