= Kiryanova =

Kiryanova Кирьянова
- Village
- Location within Perm Krai Location within Russia
- Coordinates: 59°57′N 56°16′E
- Country: Russia
- Region: Perm Krai
- District: Cherdynsky District
- Time zone: UTC+5:00

Kiryanova (Russian: Кирьянова) is a rural locality (a village) in Cherdynsky District, Perm Krai, Russia. The population was 18 as of 2010. There are 3 streets.

== Geography ==
Kiryanova is located 99 km southwest of Cherdyn (the district's administrative centre) by road. Bayandina is the nearest rural locality.
