= Kamgort =

Kamgort Камгорт
- Selo
- Location within Perm Krai Location within Russia
- Coordinates: 60°34′N 56°29′E
- Country: Russia
- Region: Perm Krai
- District: Cherdynsky District
- Time zone: UTC+5:00

Kamgort (Russian: Камгорт) is a rural locality (a selo) in Cherdynsky District, Perm Krai, Russia. The population was 152 as of 2010. There are 4 streets.

== Geography ==
Kamgort is located 22 km north of Cherdyn (the district's administrative centre) by road. Bigichi is the nearest rural locality.
