= Yaranina =

Yaranina Яранина
- Village
- Location within Perm Krai Location within Russia
- Coordinates: 60°07′N 56°14′E
- Country: Russia
- Region: Perm Krai
- District: Cherdynsky District
- Time zone: UTC+5:00

Yaranina (Russian: Яранина) is a rural locality (a village) in Cherdynsky District, Perm Krai, Russia. The population was 6 as of 2010. There is 1 street.

== Geography ==
Yaranina is located 119 km southwest of Cherdyn (the district's administrative centre) by road. Koepty is the nearest rural locality.
