= Bolshaya Anikovskaya =

Bolshaya Anikovskaya Большая Аниковская
- Village
- Location within Perm Krai Location within Russia
- Coordinates: 60°14′N 56°30′E
- Country: Russia
- Region: Perm Krai
- District: Cherdynsky District
- Time zone: UTC+5:00

Bolshaya Anikovskaya (Russian: Большая Аниковская) is a rural locality (a village) in Cherdynsky District, Perm Krai, Russia. The population was 59 as of 2010. There are 2 streets.

== Geography ==
Bolshaya Anikovskaya is located 25 km south of Cherdyn (the district's administrative centre) by road. Baydary is the nearest rural locality.
