= Redikor =

Redikor Редикор
- Selo
- Location within Perm Krai Location within Russia
- Coordinates: 60°11′N 56°27′E
- Country: Russia
- Region: Perm Krai
- District: Cherdynsky District
- Time zone: UTC+5:00

Redikor (Russian: Редикор) is a rural locality (a selo) in Cherdynsky District, Perm Krai, Russia. The population was 201 as of 2010. There are 3 streets.

== Geography ==
Redikor is located 31 km south of Cherdyn (the district's administrative centre) by road. Bolshaya Anikovskaya is the nearest rural locality.
