= Baydary =

Baydary Байдары
- Village
- Location within Perm Krai Location within Russia
- Coordinates: 60°15′N 56°30′E
- Country: Russia
- Region: Perm Krai
- District: Cherdynsky District
- Time zone: UTC+5:00

Baydary (Russian: Байдары) is a rural locality (a village) in Cherdynsky District, Perm Krai, Russia. The population was 6 as of 2010.

== Geography ==
Baydary is located 23 km south of Cherdyn (the district's administrative centre) by road. Bolshaya Anikovskaya is the nearest rural locality.
