= Abog, Perm Krai =

Abog Абог
- Village
- Location within Perm Krai Location within Russia
- Coordinates: 60°04′N 56°16′E
- Country: Russia
- Region: Perm Krai
- District: Cherdynsky District
- Time zone: [[UTC+5:00]]

Abog (Russian: Абог) is a rural locality (a village) in Ust-Urolskoye Rural Settlement of Cherdynsky District, Perm Krai, Russia. The population was 17 as of 2010. There are 2 streets.

== Geography ==
The village is located on the right bank of Kama River, 111 km southwest of Cherdyn (the district's administrative centre) by road. Istok is the nearest rural locality.
