= Kupchik =

Kupchik Купчик
- Selo
- Location within Perm Krai Location within Russia
- Coordinates: 60°39′N 56°12′E
- Country: Russia
- Region: Perm Krai
- District: Cherdynsky District
- Time zone: UTC+5:00

Kupchik (Russian: Купчик) is a rural locality (a selo) in Cherdynsky District, Perm Krai, Russia. The population was 24 as of 2010. There are 4 streets.

== Geography ==
Kupchik is located 38 km northwest of Cherdyn (the district's administrative centre) by road.
