= Limezh =

Limezh Лимеж
- Selo
- Location within Perm Krai Location within Russia
- Coordinates: 60°04′N 56°20′E
- Country: Russia
- Region: Perm Krai
- District: Cherdynsky District
- Time zone: UTC+5:00

Limezh (Russian: Лимеж) is a rural locality (a selo) in Cherdynsky District, Perm Krai, Russia. The population was 21 as of 2010. There are 2 streets.

== Geography ==
Limezh is located 53 km south of Cherdyn (the district's administrative centre) by road. Abog is the nearest rural locality.
