= Malyye Doldy =

Malyye Doldy Малые Долды
- Village
- Location within Perm Krai Location within Russia
- Coordinates: 60°15′N 56°07′E
- Country: Russia
- Region: Perm Krai
- District: Cherdynsky District
- Time zone: UTC+5:00

Malyye Doldy (Russian: Малые Долды) is a rural locality (a village) in Cherdynsky District, Perm Krai, Russia. The population was 5 as of 2010.

== Geography ==
Malyye Doldy is located 140 km southwest of Cherdyn (the district's administrative centre) by road. Bolshiye Doldy is the nearest rural locality.
