= Monthly Film Bulletin =

Periodical of the British Film Institute

- Categories: Film criticism
- Frequency: Monthly
- First issue: February 1934; 91 years ago
- Final issue Number: April 1991 v. 58, no. 687
- Company: British Film Institute
- Country: United Kingdom
- Based in: London
- Language: English
- ISSN: 0027-0407
- OCLC: 804770102

The Monthly Film Bulletin was a periodical of the British Film Institute published monthly from February 1934 until April 1991, when it merged with Sight & Sound. It reviewed all films on release in the United Kingdom, including those with a narrow arthouse release.

== History ==
The Monthly Film Bulletin was edited in the mid-1950s by David Robinson, in the late 1950s and early 1960s by Peter John Dyer, and then by Tom Milne. By the end of the 1960s, when the character and tone of its reviews changed considerably with the arrival of a new generation of critics influenced by the student culture and intellectual tumult of the time (not least the overthrow of old ideas of "taste" and quality), David Wilson was the editor. It was then edited by Jan Dawson (1938 – 1980), for two years from 1971, and from 1973 until its demise by the New Zealand-born critic Richard Combs.

In 1991, the Monthly Film Bulletin was merged with Sight & Sound, which had until then been published quarterly. Sight & Sound then became a monthly publication and took up The Monthly Film Bulletin's remit to review all films released in the UK.

The Monthly Film Bulletin was originally published to allow UK cinema managers to decide what films to show, hence the complete cast and production lists, full plot followed by a thorough critique. Only films that had been registered with the UK government trade authority were covered each month. During the years of full supporting programmes, the Monthly Film Bulletin printed long lists of B-features and short films with brief capsule reviews; by the 1970s, the tone and style of its reviews had changed considerably, and was increasingly influenced in some cases by the auteur theory and Marxist-influenced film theory, though some more traditional critics such as John Gillett remained, and others such as David McGillivray and Paul Taylor took exploitation movies more seriously than had previously been considered acceptable, while Steve Jenkins wrote a lengthy defence in 1981 of Glen or Glenda.

Another change was that all reviews had a byline – up to September 1968, only the reviews of films considered more significant by the BFI had a partial byline of initials only (so Tom Milne would be "T.M."). From January 1971, all films were listed in alphabetical order, mainly because a new wave of critics who were influencing the magazine had already overturned the assumptions implicit in the separation of films (for example, several by Sergio Leone and many from the stable of Roger Corman were only included in the "shorter notices" section). From the July 1982 issue, the Monthly Film Bulletin changed again to include more feature articles, interviews and photographs.

== Contributors ==
Monthly Film Bulletin's contributors included:

- Gilbert Adair (joined in 1979 and was a regular through the early 1980s)
- Martyn Auty (1978 – at least 1987)
- Anne Billson (1984–1990)
- Geoff Brown (1974–1991)
- Richard Combs (1969–1991; editor from 1973)
- Pam Cook (1985–1991; associate editor and contributor)
- Peter Cowie (1961–1965)
- Jan Dawson (1967–1980; editor 1971–1973)
- Raymond Durgnat (often at odds with the BFI in earlier years, but contributed regularly in the 1980s)
- Peter John Dyer (at least 1956–1966; editor in late 1950s and early 1960s)
- John Gillett (at least 1954 to at least 1983 – an unusually long run during a period when the magazine changed beyond recognition)
- Verina Glaessner (1969–1991)
- Penelope Houston (c. 1950 – mid-1970s)
- Steve Jenkins (joined in 1980 as associate editor; continued as a contributor for most of that decade)
- Gavin Lambert (c. 1950 – c. 1956/1957)
- David McGillivray (a regular throughout the 1970s)
- Tom Milne (1962–91; editor from c. 1963–1968)
- Madeline Munro
- Kim Newman (1982–1991)
- David Pirie (1969 – mid-1970s)
- Derek Prouse (mainly in 1950s; created the London Film Festival in 1957)
- Tim Pulleine (1977–1991)
- John Pym (1975–1991)
- Tony Rayns (1970–1991)
- Eric Rhode (mainly in late 1950s and early 1960s)
- David Robinson (mainly in 1950s – editor 1955–1956 but continued sporadically into the 1970s)
- Cynthia Rose (early 1980s)
- Jonathan Rosenbaum (assistant editor, 1974–1977; contributor, 1974–1977 and sporadically afterwards)
- Richard Roud (mainly in late 1950s and early 1960s)
- Elizabeth Sussex (mid-1960s)
- John Russell Taylor (first contributed in 1959; continued for much of the 1960s and into the 1970s)
- Paul Taylor (1978 – at least 1986)
- Robert Vas (mainly in late 1950s and early 1960s)
- David Wilson (1965 – at least 1987, though very sporadic in later years; editor from c. 1968–1971)
- Robin Wood (often at odds with the BFI, but briefly contributed c. 1972/1973.)
