= Iskor =

Iskor Искор
- Selo
- Location within Perm Krai Location within Russia
- Coordinates: 60°39′N 56°42′E
- Country: Russia
- Region: Perm Krai
- District: Cherdynsky District
- Time zone: UTC+5:00

Iskor (Russian: Искор) is a rural locality (a selo) in Cherdynsky District, Perm Krai, Russia. The population was 155 as of 2010. There are 4 streets.

== Geography ==
Iskor is located 37 km northeast of Cherdyn (the district's administrative centre) by road. Bulyga is the nearest rural locality.
