= Petretsovo =

Petretsovo Петрецово
- Settlement
- Location within Perm Krai Location within Russia
- Coordinates: 61°15′N 57°12′E
- Country: Russia
- Region: Perm Krai
- District: Cherdynsky District
- Time zone: UTC+5:00

Petretsovo (Russian: Петрецово) is a rural locality (a settlement) in Cherdynsky District, Perm Krai, Russia. The population was 171 as of 2010.

== Geography ==
Petretsovo is located 190 km northeast of Cherdyn (the district's administrative centre) by road. Rusinovo is the nearest rural locality.
