= Vizhay, Cherdynsky District, Perm Krai =

Vizhay Вижай
- Settlement
- Location within Perm Krai Location within Russia
- Coordinates: 60°55′N 57°52′E
- Country: Russia
- Region: Perm Krai
- District: Cherdynsky District
- Time zone: UTC+5:00

Vizhay (Russian: Вижай) is a rural locality (a settlement) in Cherdynsky District, Perm Krai, Russia. The population was 179 as of 2010. There are 5 streets.

== Geography ==
Vizhay is located 133 km northeast of Cherdyn (the district's administrative centre) by road. Valay is the nearest rural locality.
