= Ust-Urolka =

Ust-Urolka Усть-Уролка
- Village
- Location within Perm Krai Location within Russia
- Coordinates: 60°07′N 56°10′E
- Country: Russia
- Region: Perm Krai
- District: Cherdynsky District
- Time zone: UTC+5:00

Ust-Urolka (Russian: Усть-Уролка) is a rural locality (a village) in Cherdynsky District, Perm Krai, Russia. The population was 111 as of 2010. There are 6 streets.

== Geography ==
Ust-Urolka is located 121 km southwest of Cherdyn (the district's administrative centre) by road. Yaranina is the nearest rural locality.
