= Yezova =

Yezova Езова
- Village
- Location within Perm Krai Location within Russia
- Coordinates: 60°33′N 56°26′E
- Country: Russia
- Region: Perm Krai
- District: Cherdynsky District
- Time zone: UTC+5:00

Yezova (Russian: Езова) is a rural locality (a village) in Cherdynsky District, Perm Krai, Russia. The population was 60 as of 2010.

== Geography ==
Yezova is located 20 km north of Cherdyn (the district's administrative centre) by road. Vilgort is the nearest rural locality.
