= Urol =

Urol Урол
- Village
- Location within Perm Krai Location within Russia
- Coordinates: 60°19′N 56°19′E
- Country: Russia
- Region: Perm Krai
- District: Cherdynsky District
- Time zone: UTC+5:00

Urol (Russian: Урол) is a rural locality (a village) in Cherdynsky District, Perm Krai, Russia. The population was 60 as of 2010. There are 3 streets.

== Geography ==
Urol is located 21 km southwest of Cherdyn (the district's administrative centre) by road. Kushpelevo is the nearest rural locality.
