= Savina, Cherdynsky District, Perm Krai =

Savina Савина
- Village
- Location within Perm Krai Location within Russia
- Coordinates: 60°30′N 56°13′E
- Country: Russia
- Region: Perm Krai
- District: Cherdynsky District
- Time zone: UTC+5:00

Savina (Russian: Савина) is a rural locality (a village) in Cherdynsky District, Perm Krai, Russia. The population was 48 as of 2010. There is one street.

== Geography ==
Savina is located 22 km northwest of Cherdyn (the district's administrative centre) by road. Anisimovo is the nearest rural locality.
