= Verkhnyaya Kolva =

Verkhnyaya Kolva Верхняя Колва
- Settlement
- Location within Perm Krai Location within Russia
- Coordinates: 61°07′N 57°15′E
- Country: Russia
- Region: Perm Krai
- District: Cherdynsky District
- Time zone: UTC+5:00

Verkhnyaya Kolva (Russian: Верхняя Колва) is a rural locality (a settlement) in Cherdynsky District, Perm Krai, Russia. The population was 542 as of 2010. There are 5 streets.

== Geography ==
Verkhnyaya Kolva is located 171 km northeast of Cherdyn (the district's administrative centre) by road. Gadya is the nearest rural locality.
