= Bondyug =

Bondyug Бондюг
- Selo
- Location within Perm Krai Location within Russia
- Coordinates: 60°29′N 55°55′E
- Country: Russia
- Region: Perm Krai
- District: Cherdynsky District
- Time zone: UTC+5:00

Bondyug (Russian: Бондюг) is a rural locality (a selo) and the administrative center of Bondyuzhskoye Rural Settlement, Cherdynsky District, Perm Krai, Russia. The population was 577 as of 2010. There are 7 streets.

== Geography ==
Bondyug is located 35 km west of Cherdyn (the district's administrative centre) by road. Rakina is the nearest rural locality.
