= Kolva, Perm Krai =

Kolva Колва
- Settlement
- Location within Perm Krai Location within Russia
- Coordinates: 60°43′N 56°33′E
- Country: Russia
- Region: Perm Krai
- District: Cherdynsky District
- Time zone: UTC+5:00

Kolva (Russian: Колва) is a rural locality (a settlement) in Cherdynsky District, Perm Krai, Russia. The population was 41 as of 2010. There are 9 streets.

== Geography ==
Kolva is located 48 km north of Cherdyn (the district's administrative centre) by road. Nyrob is the nearest rural locality.
