= Valay (settlement) =

Valay Валай
- Settlement
- Location within Perm Krai Location within Russia
- Coordinates: 60°49′N 57°30′E
- Country: Russia
- Region: Perm Krai
- District: Cherdynsky District
- Time zone: UTC+5:00

Valay (Russian: Валай) is a rural locality (a settlement) in Cherdynsky District, Perm Krai, Russia. The population was 1,093 as of 2010. There are 7 streets.

== Geography ==
Valay is located 100 km northeast of Cherdyn (the district's administrative centre) by road. Vizhay is the nearest rural locality.
