= Verkhneye Kerchevo =

Verkhneye Kerchevo Верхнее Керчево
- Settlement
- Location within Perm Krai Location within Russia
- Coordinates: 59°56′N 56°18′E
- Country: Russia
- Region: Perm Krai
- District: Cherdynsky District
- Time zone: UTC+5:00

Verkhneye Kerchevo (Russian: Верхнее Керчево) is a rural locality (a settlement) in Cherdynsky District, Perm Krai, Russia. The population was 33 as of 2010. There are 2 streets.

== Geography ==
Verkhneye Kerchevo is located 94 km south of Cherdyn (the district's administrative centre) by road. Nizhneye Kerchevo is the nearest rural locality.
