= Lobanikha =

Lobanikha Лобаниха
- Settlement
- Location within Perm Krai Location within Russia
- Coordinates: 60°30′N 56°27′E
- Country: Russia
- Region: Perm Krai
- District: Cherdynsky District
- Time zone: UTC+5:00

Lobanikha (Russian: Лобаниха) is a rural locality (a settlement) in Cherdynsky District, Perm Krai, Russia. The population was 55 as of 2010. There is 1 street.

== Geography ==
Lobanikha is located 12 km north of Cherdyn (the district's administrative centre) by road. Pokcha is the nearest rural locality.
