= Zapolnaya =

Zapolnaya Запольная
- Village
- Location within Vologda Oblast Location within Russia
- Coordinates: 60°02′N 43°02′E
- Country: Russia
- Region: Vologda Oblast
- District: Totemsky District
- Time zone: UTC+3:00

Zapolnaya (Russian: Запольная) is a rural locality (a village) in Medvedevskoye Rural Settlement, Totemsky District, Vologda Oblast, Russia. The population was 2 as of 2002.

== Geography ==
Zapolnaya is located 20 km northeast of Totma (the district's administrative centre) by road. Lobanikha is the nearest rural locality.
