= Bayandina =

Bayandina Баяндина
- Village
- Location within Perm Krai Location within Russia
- Coordinates: 59°58′N 56°16′E
- Country: Russia
- Region: Perm Krai
- District: Cherdynsky District
- Time zone: UTC+5:00

Bayandina (Russian: Баяндина) is a rural locality (a village) in Cherdynsky District, Perm Krai, Russia. The population was 23 as of 2010. There is 1 street.

== Geography ==
Bayandina is located 99 km south of Cherdyn (the district's administrative centre) by road. Kiryanova is the nearest rural locality.
