= Encounter (magazine) =

UK literary magazine

- Categories: Literary magazine
- Frequency: Monthly
- Founder: Stephen Spender and Irving Kristol
- First issue: October 1953
- Final issue: 1990
- Company: Congress for Cultural Freedom (1953–1964); International Publishing Corporation (from 1964)
- Country: United Kingdom
- Based in: London
- Language: English
- ISSN: 0013-7073

Encounter was a literary magazine founded in 1953 by poet Stephen Spender and journalist Irving Kristol. The magazine ceased publication in 1990 and the operations closed in 1991. Published in the United Kingdom, it was an Anglo-American intellectual and cultural journal, originally associated with the anti-Stalinist left. The magazine received covert funding from the Central Intelligence Agency who, along with MI6, discussed the founding of an "Anglo-American left-of-centre publication" intended to counter the idea of Cold War neutralism. The magazine was rarely critical of American foreign policy and generally shaped its content to support the geopolitical interests of the United States government.

Spender, who served as co-editor until 1965 and then as a contributing editor, resigned in 1967, together with his replacement Frank Kermode, after the covert CIA funding for the magazine was revealed. Thomas W. Braden, who headed the CIA's International Organisations Division's operations between 1951 and 1954, said that the money for the magazine "came from the CIA, and few outside the CIA knew about it. We had placed one agent in a Europe-based organization of intellectuals called the Congress for Cultural Freedom." Roy Jenkins observed that earlier contributors were aware of U.S. funding but believed it came from philanthropists, including a Cincinnati gin distiller.

Encounter experienced its most successful years in terms of readership and influence under Melvin J. Lasky, who succeeded Kristol in 1958 and would serve as the main editor until the magazine ceased publication in 1991. Other editors in this period included D. J. Enright.

== Founding, funding and first editors ==
Representatives of MI6 and the CIA met in 1951 to discuss the creation of an “Anglo-American left-of-centre publication”, partly to counter the New Statesman. Three intelligence officers, Michael Josselson and Lawrence de Neufville of the CIA, and Monty Woodhouse of the Information Research Department, worked out the financing and distribution of the publication, using the CIA funded and managed Congress for Cultural Freedom (CCF) as cover. Encounter launched in 1953. The CIA provided much of the funding through a dummy foundation. Funding from Britain was provided in the form of cash given to the magazine’s managing editor or cheques signed by Alexander Korda and Victor Rothschild, both of whom were aware of the set up.

In 1954, the Japanologist Herbert Passin assumed the role of the magazine's Far Eastern representative, based in Tokyo, in which he acted for three years.

In 1963, Donald McLachlan, editor of the Sunday Telegraph, published an article which revealed that the UK Foreign Office was covertly funding Encounter. The article caused consternation among the UK and US intelligence services, which convinced Edward Heath, who was McLachlan's source, to tell McLachlan that the information was incorrect. The Sunday Telegraph issued a retraction in which it withdrew "any suggestion there might have been that the Foreign Office provided a subsidy and that the editorial independence of Encounter is not in question".

In 1964, the ownership of Encounter was transferred from the CCF to Cecil Harmsworth King's International Publishing Corporation. Given King's links to British and American intelligence services, this was an attempt to preserve the magazine's credibility.

The covert partial funding of Encounter by the Central Intelligence Agency (and Britain's MI6), via such American organisations as the Farfield Foundation, and thence to the CCF, was revealed in March 1967 in the pages of Ramparts, The New York Times, and the Saturday Evening Post. John le Carré then suggested to Kermode that the source of funding would not have been altered by the change in ownership. Spender and Kermode asked Lasky, who admitted to Kermode that he had known of the CIA connection since being told by Josselson in 1963, to resign. However, King and the magazine's trustees decided to retain Lasky, which prompted Spender and Kermode to depart in early May 1967. According to CIA official Ray S. Cline the journal "would not have been able to survive financially without CIA funds". Its bibliography shows shifting patterns of high-journalistic political allegiance, especially in the cultural sphere. Shifts on both sides of the Atlantic triggered by the rise of the "neoconservative" tendency in opposition to the prevailing left-liberalism in elite opinion are evident.

The choices for the first two Encounter co-editors, the American political essayist Irving Kristol (1920–2009) and the English poet Stephen Spender (1909–95) were telling, and in retrospect, can be seen to have set in template much of the course of the magazine's evolution even over its final twenty-three years succeeding Spender's resignation in 1967, after the revelations of covert CIA-funding.

== Irving Kristol and the New York intellectuals ==
Irving Kristol edited the political articles in Encounter from 1953 until 1958, and though still a self-described liberal at the time, he was already laying the foundations of his eventual stance, from the late 1970s until his death in 2009, as the "godfather of neoconservatism." Influenced by his experiences in the City College of New York cafeterias of the late 1930s, where Marxists, Trotskyists and Stalinists argued freely, Kristol had already, as early as 1952, in his writings in Commentary during the McCarthy years, set the tone for the neo-populist critique of liberal "new class" elites he would later seed during his almost forty-year stint (1965–2002) as founding co-editor of The Public Interest, the public-policy quarterly.

== Stephen Spender and the English literary legacy ==
Stephen Spender cut a larger figure in strictly cultural circles, though with strong political engagements of his own – he was, at 44, one of England's leading men of letters of his generation, having been a prime constituent of the 1930s "MacSpaunday" generation of young English poets whose other members included Louis MacNeice, W.H. Auden, and C. Day Lewis. During his brief Communist phase in the 1930s, he had served in the Spanish Civil War with the anti-Franco International Brigades and later contributed to the essay collection The God That Failed (1949) edited by Richard Crossman. The other contributors who had become disillusioned with Communism included Louis Fischer, André Gide, Arthur Koestler, Ignazio Silone, and Richard Wright; Koestler and Silone would in turn become from its outset regular contributors to Encounter. Spender's apprenticeship in the editor's chair had come over a decade before when he served as deputy to the English aesthete Cyril Connolly in editing, for its first two years, the influential literary monthly Horizon (1940–49), many of whose writers would show up in Encounter in due course throughout the 1950s and after.

Spender's range of cultural contacts, in and out of the academic world, combined with the high-stakes sense of Cold War cultural mission driving the Paris-based CCF, enabled Encounter to publish, especially during its first fourteen years prior to the revelation of the early CIA funding and the defections so provoked, an international range of poets, short-story writers, novelists, critics, historians, philosophers and journalists, from both sides of the Iron Curtain. The long tail of the Bloomsbury, World War I, and Bright Young Things generations of the early 20th century was a marked feature of the early years of Spender's tenure as the editor of the Encounter's literary pages, with contributors such as Robert Graves, Aldous Huxley, Nancy Mitford, Bertrand Russell, Edith Sitwell, John Strachey, Evelyn Waugh, and Leonard and Virginia Woolf – Virginia in posthumous diary form, her surviving husband Leonard as a political essayist and reviewer.

== Oxbridge and London academics ==
Encounter provided a prime forum for academics from the colleges of Oxford, Cambridge, and London Universities—Isaiah Berlin, Hugh Trevor-Roper, and A. J. P. Taylor among them—who discussed European history and the intellectuals helping to shape it. Trevor-Roper used the magazine as an outlet for his attacks, one on Arnold Toynbee's best-selling ten-volume Study of History, and on The Origins of the Second World War by A. J. P. Taylor.

Early outings by Encounter belletrists came when Nancy Mitford and Evelyn Waugh playfully debated over successive issues the fine points of upper-class vs. lower-class English usage ("U and non-U"), as did C. P. Snow and others, if less playfully, Snow's depiction within of a yawning chasm of mind between the "Two Cultures" of the hard sciences and the humanities. Among the magazine's early luminaries in aesthetics and the history of art were Stuart Hampshire and Richard Wollheim.

== Political contours ==
On the political side of Encounter, Kristol brought on board many members of the group usually known as The New York Intellectuals, both journalist, literary and polemical or social-scientific, among whom he had passed the years of his apprenticeship: the sociologists Daniel Bell and Nathan Glazer, who, respectively, would later serve as his successive co-editors (and, like Spender, political foils, especially in Bell's more pronounced case) at The Public Interest, Sidney Hook, and, not least, the ideological hummingbird and scourge of "Midcult" Dwight Macdonald, who spent a year (1955–56) in London as associate editor, a tenure with which he would later attempt to make a retrospective reckoning in his "Politics" column in Esquire for June 1967 in what he would describe several months later as his "Confessions of an Unwitty CIA Agent". Mainline Americans for Democratic Action-style left-liberal Democrats such as Arthur Schlesinger, Jr. and John Kenneth Galbraith rounded out the American contours in politics, while the early English contributions in politics came largely from the social-democratic, anti-Communist, anti-unilateral nuclear disarmament wing of the Labour fold, as represented by C.A.R. Crosland (Anthony Crosland) (a close friend of Daniel Bell), R.H.S. Crossman (Richard Crossman), and David Marquand, with occasional contributions from Conservative journalists such as Peregrine Worsthorne and the young Henry Fairlie broadening the coverage.

Encounter provoked controversy, with some British commentators arguing the journal took an excessively deferential stand towards United States foreign policy. Cambridge literary critic Graham Hough described the magazine as "that strange Anglo-American nursling" which had "a very odd concept of culture indeed". The Sunday Times referred to Encounter as "the police-review of American-occupied countries".

Discussing the Encounter of the 1950s, Stefan Collini in 2006 wrote that although Encounter was not "narrowly sectarian in either political or aesthetic terms, its pages gave off a distinct whiff of Cold War polemicizing".

== Melvin Lasky and the 1960s ==
The transition to Kristol's replacement on the political side of Encounter in 1958 by Melvin J. Lasky (1920–2004) was seamless, and a key factor both in the broadening of the magazine's international scope to include a deeper extension of its European coverage, from the Soviet bloc not least, as well as its coverage of the newly decolonised nations of Africa and Asia. After combat with the seventh army and postwar service in Berlin under military governor Lucius Clay, Lasky founded the German-language monthly Der Monat (The Month), and, amid an adult life spent largely ever since in Germany, was enlisted in 1955 back in New York to edit the first two numbers of The Anchor Review (1955–57), an annual published by the new Anchor Books imprint of Doubleday, fruit of the 1950s quality-paperback revolution spearheaded by Jason Epstein, and whose international roster of high-humanist contributors – Auden, Connolly, Koestler, Silone – made it resemble a concurrent mini-Encounter.

== Ties to Eastern Bloc dissidents ==
During his 32 years at Encounter, Lasky, with his balding head and Van Dyke beard centrally cast as an inverted Lenin, proved instrumental in the long and dedicated cultivation of contacts from among the persecuted writers of Poland (i.a. Czesław Miłosz, Zbigniew Herbert), East Germany, Hungary, Romania, the Soviet Union, and then-Yugoslavia, and devoted extensive front-cover coverage throughout the 1960s and 1970s to the judicial travails in Russia of Andrei Sinyavsky (a.k.a. "Abram Tertz", under which nom de plume several samizdat short stories appeared), Yuli Daniel, Joseph Brodsky and Aleksandr Solzhenitsyn, and in Poland to the case of Leszek Kołakowski, the philosopher exiled to the West in 1968 by the Polish Communist Party, and who became one of the magazine's defining contributors, whose blend of intellectual history and anti-Soviet militancy made him a sort of Slavic cross between Isaiah Berlin and Sidney Hook. A special 65-page anthology in April 1963, "New Voices in Russian Writing," presented, with the aid of translations by poets W. H. Auden, Robert Conquest, Stanley Kunitz and Richard Wilbur, a selection of the latest works of the rising generation of Russian poets and short-story writers, among them Andrei Voznesensky, Yevgeny Yevtushenko, and Vasily Aksyonov ("Matryona's Home," the most-read short story by Solzhenitsyn, was held over until the next issue).

== Focus on decolonised nations ==
As for the nations of the so-called developing world, thanks in part to Spender's early attention to matters echt-English, the aftermath of the British Empire not least, Indian affairs, especially as they involved writers and intellectuals, were prominent on the contents page, with the heterodox essayist and memoirist Nirad Chaudhuri among the earliest of the magazine's long-serving correspondents from the subcontinent. Lasky, for his part, having written and published Africa For Beginners in 1962, made a point of devoting a special issue to that continent, along with others devoted to Asia and Latin America.

== Changing times ==
The 1960s would prove to be the high-water mark of Encounter's time on the world newsstand. As distinguished symposiasts from diverse spheres debated in its political sections such matters as the advisability of Britain's entry into the European Economic Community, the expansion of its tax-funded higher-education system, the aftermath of empire and the strains of assimilating the influx of immigrants from the decolonised nations, and the latest false dawn for socialists in Cuba, a rising generation of critics and scholars engaged the newly arrived high thinkers of the age – Clifford Geertz, R.D. Laing, Claude Lévi-Strauss, Konrad Lorenz, György Lukács, Marshall McLuhan – and speculated on the prospect of other false dawns in culture rather than politics. In the case of the imagined Arcadia presaged by the new wave of "high pornography", reformers like Olympia Press founder Maurice Girodias weighed in for the defence, with conservative sociologist Ernest van den Haag countering with a measured defence of the social need for both pornography and censorship, with the young George Steiner, dissenting from what to him seemed the neo-totalitarian import entailed by the literal stripping of literary characters of any vestige of privacy, in contrast to the more artful metaphoric indirections of such masters as Dante.

== English poets ==
Encounter was eclectic in the poets it published. Its literary co-editors generally had a background in poetry, with Spender succeeded by the literary critic Frank Kermode. There were the critics, novelists and poets Nigel Dennis (1967–70) and D. J. Enright (1970–72), and the poet Anthony Thwaite (1973–85). Poets affiliated from the 1950s with The Movement —Kingsley Amis, Robert Conquest, Donald Davie, Enright, Thom Gunn, Elizabeth Jennings, Philip Larkin, and John Wain–contributed to the magazine, in many cases, in fiction and in essays also. Conquest, an independent historian of the Stalin years in Russia (The Great Terror, 1968), held a sceptical attitude toward left-liberalism. Amis published in Encounter in 1960 an article against the expansion of higher education, that proved influential.

== Left-liberals vs. early neoconservatives ==
The more explicit development of that very scepticism, as it happened, came to mark the evolution of the political side of Encounter as it entered the 1970s and beyond. The ideological fissures in the world of Anglo-American political/literary journals began to see hairline crack turn to outright cleavage in the wake of the rise of the neoconservative movement. The biweekly New York Review of Books, founded in 1963, began to enlist from its outset a regular roster of the cream of the very sort of prestige British humanists and scientific essayists who had so distinguished themselves in the pages of Encounter in its first ten years, creating a rival outlet for them whose greater prominence in the much larger American market would only deepen after the 1967 high-profile resignations of Spender and Kermode, both of them at the very summit of Anglo-American literary life.

The then largely intra-Democratic rifts issuing from reactions to, for instance, the Vietnam War, student radicalism and the New Left, urban strife, the Great Society, the rise of Black Power and affirmative action, played out on the contents pages of the highbrow journals in a sharpening of sides among the political contributors to the liberal-to-radical (in politics if not in art and literature) New York Review in opposition to the post-1970 rightward shift of Commentary under Norman Podhoretz; the New York Review had already as of its third year (1965, when Kristol and Bell founded The Public Interest) shed the future neoconservatives who had marked its first two years. Another sign of the times came in 1972, when Daniel Bell, firmly of the social-democratic, anti-Stalinist, Old Left/Menshevik tendency, resigned from his co-editorship of The Public Interest, rather than strain his long friendship with Irving Kristol, who had recently left the Democratic fold and come out, for Richard Nixon, easing into his final four decades in the ideological orbit of, e.g., the editorial page of The Wall Street Journal. Some among the nascent neoconservatives, like Bell's successor Nathan Glazer, would remain Democrats, while others would form the Reagan Democrats and go on to play a pivotal role in the 1980 and 1984 elections.

== 1970s ==
The economic crisis of the 1970s, afflicting all the world's advanced democracies with a corrosive blend of decade-long inflation, sector-wide industrial strikes, overburdened welfare states expanded under pressure of an affluence-driven "revolution of rising expectations", the overturning of the supremacy of Keynesian economics under a simultaneous inflation and recession long thought inconceivable, and the resulting unravelling of the postwar, bipartisan social-democratic consensus – such was the stuff of a good portion of the debate on domestic affairs within Encounter throughout the 1970s. Those from the center-left addressing such topics included the veteran analysts of capitalism Andrew Shonfield and Robert Skidelsky, biographer of Keynes, and economic historian of Depression Britain. Among those from the developing New Right to assail eminent thinkers leftward was the Australian-born LSE political scientist Kenneth Minogue, among whose many contributions was a stinging rebuke to John Kenneth Galbraith for offering, in his 1977 documentary series The Age of Uncertainty, far more wit than wisdom – a charge to which the Harvard economist replied, wittily.

Novelist and political writer, Ferdinand Mount, then in his thirties and later to serve as a Thatcherite policy adviser early the next decade, did regular double duty as political essayist and book reviewer. And thirty years after The Road to Serfdom had made the name of Friedrich A. Hayek known among the non-economist educated public, the Austrian-born thinker, in the decade that saw his writings earn him both the Nobel Prize in Economics and a starring role in the education of the English prime minister newly arrived at its end, contributed four essays in the history of ideas, among them one on "The Miscarriage of the Democratic Ideal" and another on his cousin Ludwig Wittgenstein. Shirley Robin Letwin took the American liberal legal philosopher Ronald Dworkin to task for promoting judicial activism in his signature work Taking Rights Seriously, while the conservative philosopher Roger Scruton, a recent Encounter hand, examined the cultural roots of latter-day ills, and economist EJ Mishan> assayed the parasitic moral hazards arising from economic growth. And lively debate over the north–south divide, the Brandt Report, and western foreign aid to the 'Third World' was on hand courtesy of the prestigious development economist Peter Bauer and his critics.

== Hazards of détente ==
In foreign affairs in the 1970s, Encounter's prime interests, along with Euro-terrorism and Euro-communism, included the strains upon the detente with the Soviet Union inaugurated during the Richard Nixon and Gerald Ford years posed by the military buildup and underlying intentions, conventional and nuclear, of the Soviet Union, the latter's renewed adventurism-by-proxy in the Middle East and in Africa, and its ongoing abuses in human rights and in the coerced psychiatric treatment of dissidents. One of the prime set-pieces among the hawk-vs-dove needle-matches underway came with a six-instalment series in which the eminent diplomat-historian — and "containment" theorist of the first years of the Cold War — George F. Kennan, then in his early seventies, squared off against his critics in the form of several interviews he had granted to George Urban of Radio Free Europe, with detailed rejoinders — and another mutual follow-up round — in succeeding issues by the veteran historian of the Russian empire at the University of London's School of Slavonic and East European Studies, Hugh Seton-Watson, by Richard Pipes of Harvard — the latter due in several years for a post helping Ronald Reagan plot strategy toward the Soviet Union — and Leopold Labedz, Polish-born editor of Survey, a quarterly journal of Soviet-bloc affairs. The exchanges, marked each time on the part of Kennan's critics by a ritual and almost incantatory deference to his stature and role as almost Old Testament wise man, grew increasingly testy on both sides, with Seton-Watson accusing Kennan of allowing his aristocratic-utopian hand-wringing over Western cultural degeneracy to vanquish his sense of the moral urgency and legitimacy of the west's need to better defend itself against a newly hardened foe, with Pipes accusing him of an overly-optimistic estimate of relaxation in Soviet military strategy since the death of Stalin, charges amplified by Labedz. Kennan, for his part in reply, fired back from several angles with a long-running complaint of his, perhaps best summarised as: nobody understands me.

== Contributing literary figures ==
The range of literary figures, some young and others established, whose first contributions to Encounter came during the 1970s included novelists Martin Amis, Italo Calvino, Elias Canetti, Margaret Drabble, Ruth Prawer Jhabvala, Paul Theroux, D.M. Thomas, William Trevor, critics and essayists Clive James, Gabriel Josipovici, Bernard Levin, David Lodge, Jonathan Raban, Wilfrid Sheed, Gillian Tindall, poets Alan Brownjohn, Douglas Dunn, Gavin Ewart, James Fenton, Seamus Heaney, Erica Jong, Michael Longley, John Mole, Blake Morrison, Andrew Motion, Tom Paulin, Peter Porter, Peter Reading, Peter Redgrove, Vernon Scannell, George Szirtes, and R. S. Thomas.

== 1980s and end of the Cold War ==
The final decade for Encounter, the 1980s, was marked by regular elegy for old and distinguished friends of the magazine who had aged along with it, chief among them the Hungarian-born writer Arthur Koestler and the French political philosopher and journalist Raymond Aron. Longtime social-democrat friend of the magazine Sidney Hook died at 86 in July 1989, missing by less than six months the peaceful revolutions in Eastern Europe, previewed his memoir Out of Step: An Unquiet Life in the Twentieth Century in Encounter in the mid-1980s. As Brezhnev gave way to Andropov, then to Chernenko and finally to Gorbachev, such contributors as former Labour cabinet secretary (Lord) Alun Chalfont were dedicated to exposing what they saw as the errors of assorted unilateralist disarmers in the peace movement and foes of nuclear deterrence such as the English historian E.P. Thompson, as the NATO agreement to counteract Soviet SS-20s in the European theatre took shape. The Polish resistance still covertly active after the crushing of the Solidarity trade union movement by martial law received ongoing coverage. Encounter's range of political contributors edged closer to the stateside neoconservative orbit found in the 1980s grouped round, such as Commentary, the editorial page of The Wall Street Journal, and the American Spectator.

Edward Pearce, a regular contributor to the magazine in the 1980s, claimed that Encounter's editors reassigned him from political writing to theatre criticism after he repeatedly used his Encounter column to criticise the Thatcher government.

Though the literary side of Encounter throughout the 1980s featured a far smaller proportion of writers at the forefront of their national literatures as had its 1960s incarnation under Stephen Spender, and a 1983 change in cover design scrapped its austere "Continental" template in favour of a glossy look more characteristic of proverbially "slick" periodicals familiar from American newsstands, given the lofty heights from which it would recede, it still sustained its nonpolitical autonomy and ample proportions when the English poet Anthony Thwaite was replaced in 1985 by Richard Mayne, an English journalist, broadcaster, translator from the French, the magazine's Paris correspondent and "M." columnist, and former assistant to Jean Monnet, architect of the European Economic Community.

Encounter published its final issue in September 1990, almost a year after the fall of the Berlin Wall and the collapse of Communist rule in the European satellites, and a year before the largely peaceful demise of Soviet rule itself. The magazine's end was brought about due to its increasing debts. The Bradley Foundation acquired the name and helped close down the Encounter organisation in 1991.

== Assessments ==
Thanks to the uncommon distinction, disciplinary and geographic range of the contributors it brought together in one venture, especially during the years 1953–67 prior to the CIA-funding revelations, Encounter earned regard as a high-water mark in postwar periodical literature. In a review of recent work by Stephen Spender in The New Republic in 1963, the American poet John Berryman wrote, "I don't know how Spender has got so many poems done, especially because he does many things besides write poetry: he is a brilliant and assiduous editor (I would call Encounter the most consistently interesting magazine now being published)." In the early 1970s, the American monthly Esquire said of Encounter that it was "probably not as good now as when it was backed by the CIA, but [it is] still the best general monthly magazine going." In the late 1970s, The Observer was of the opinion that "Encounter is a magazine which constantly provides, in any given month, exactly what a great many of us would have wished to read... there is no other journal in the English-speaking world which combines political and cultural material of such consistently high quality", while the International Herald Tribune called Encounter "one of the few great beacons of English-language journalism... a model of how to present serious writing." In a review in 2011 in The New Republic of a posthumous collection of essays by Irving Kristol, Franklin Foer wrote that "Encounter... deserve[s] a special place in the history of the higher journalism... [it] was some of the best money that the [CIA] ever spent. The journal, published out of London, was an unlikely coupling of the New York intelligentsia with their English counterparts—an exhilarating intermarriage of intellectual cultures. I am not sure that any magazine has ever been quite so good as the early Encounter, with its essays by Mary McCarthy and Nancy Mitford, Lionel Trilling and Isaiah Berlin, Edmund Wilson and Cyril Connolly. In his typically self-effacing manner, Kristol heaped credit upon Spender for the achievement."

Richard Wollheim said that Encounter gave "the impression that it was the whole spectrum of opinion they were publishing. But invariably they were cutting it off at a certain point, notably where it concerned areas of American foreign policy”. One CIA chief described Encounter as "propaganda in the sense that it did not often deviate from what the State Department would say US foreign policy was". Frances Stonor Saunders wrote in 1999 that Encounter is "rightly remembered for its unflinching scrutiny of cultural curtailment in the communist bloc. But its mitigation of McCarthyism was less clear-sighted: where the journal could see the beam in its opponent’s eye, it failed to detect the plank in its own".

== Most prolific authors ==
The following is a list of all authors who appeared in Encounter at least ten times:

- Dannie Abse (16)
- Anna Adams (11)
- F.R. Allemann (15)
- Kingsley Amis (11)
- Raymond Aron (37)
- W.H. Auden (33)
- A. J. Ayer (12)
- Luigi Barzini (25)
- Daniel Bell (16)
- Max Beloff (71)
- Bernard Bergonzi (22)
- Vernon Bogdanor (13)
- Francois Bondy (70)
- Jorge Luis Borges (13)
- John Bossy (14)
- Malcolm Bradbury (24)
- Edwin Brock (16)
- D.W. Brogan (32])
- Alan Brownjohn (42)
- Zbigniew Brzezinski (10)
- Alastair Buchan (19)
- Anthony Burgess (13)
- Alun Chalfont (10)
- Michael Charlton (10)
- Nicola Chiaromonte (10)
- Robert Conquest (21)
- Hilary Corke (42)
- Maurice Cranston (33)
- C.A.R. Crosland (18)
- R.H.S. Crossman (17)
- Brian Crozier (10)
- Marcus Cunliffe (30)
- Nigel Dennis (43)
- Milovan Djilas (12)
- Douglas Dunn (52)
- Alistair Elliot (14)
- D.J. Enright (80)
- Martin Esslin (25)
- Gavin Ewart (37)
- H.J. Eysenck (15)
- Henry Fairlie (24)
- François Fejtő (11)
- Leslie Fiedler (11)
- Constantine FitzGibbon (17)
- John Fuller (11)
- Roy Fuller (22)
- P. N. Furbank (18)
- T.R. Fyvel (27)
- John Gohorry (19)
- Geoffrey Gorer (17)
- Julius Gould (15)
- K.W. Gransden (17)
- Günter Grass (11)
- Robert Graves (13)
- Herb Greer (11)
- Geoffrey Grigson (30)
- John Gross (18)
- Paul Groves (13)
- Louis J. Halle (10)
- Michael Hamburger (19)
- Stuart Hampshire (19)
- Patrick Hare (14)
- Anthony Hartley (64)
- Ronald Hayman (18)
- John Holloway (20)
- Sidney Hook (30)
- Michael Howard (18)
- G.F. Hudson (12)
- Ted Hughes (10)
- Michael Hulse (16)
- Dan Jacobson (15)
- Elizabeth Jennings (18)
- Jenny Joseph (11)
- Elie Kedourie (20)
- Frank Kermode (31)
- Roy Kerridge (11)
- Arthur Koestler (19)
- Leszek Kołakowski (12)
- Irving Kristol (46)
- Leopold Labedz (22)
- Walter Laqueur (26)
- Melvin J. Lasky (72)
- Laurence Lerner (39)
- Norman Levine (10)
- Penelope Lively (12)
- Michael Longley (13])
- John Loveday (12)
- Edward Lowbury (10)
- Richard Löwenthal (39)
- Edward Lucie-Smith (15)
- Herbert Lüthy (18)
- George MacBeth (14)
- Dwight Macdonald (17)
- Colin MacInnes (24)
- Alasdair MacIntyre (12)
- John Mander (24)
- Golo Mann (17)
- David Marquand (21)
- Derwent May (11)
- Gerda Mayer (10)
- Richard Mayne (including "M." and "R.M" of "Books Encountered" feature) (172)
- George Mikes (19)
- Stephen Miller (10)
- Kenneth Minogue (21)
- E. J. Mishan (13)
- John Mole (39)
- Jan Morris (pre-April 1973 as James Morris) (39)
- Blake Morrison (10)
- Ferdinand Mount (16)
- Kathleen Nott (15)
- Frank Ormsby (17)
- Tom Paulin (16)
- Edward Pearce (66)
- Peter Porter (56)
- Isabel Quigly (11)
- Jonathan Raban (11)
- Herbert Read (10)
- Peter Reading (19)
- Peter Redgrove (38)
- Goronwy Rees (including as columnist "[R.]") (158)
- Jean-François Revel (61)
- Eric Rhode (13)
- Theodore Roethke (11)
- David Rokeah (18)
- Alan Ross (20)
- Carol Rumens (11)
- Malcolm Rutherford (13)
- William Sansom (12)
- Vernon Scannell (27)
- Leonard Schapiro (10)
- Arthur Schlesinger, Jr. (12)
- Peter Scupham (10)
- Hugh Seton-Watson (16)
- Edward Shils (22)
- Andrew Shonfield (22)
- Ruth Silcock (10)
- Burns Singer (18)
- Stephen Spender (45)
- George Steiner (24)
- Christopher Sykes (31)
- David Sylvester (17)
- George Szirtes (17)
- D.M. Thomas (14)
- R.S. Thomas (20)
- Anthony Thwaite (38)
- Gillian Tindall (13)
- Charles Tomlinson (10)
- Philip Toynbee (18)
- William Trevor (11)
- Hugh Trevor-Roper (14)
- George Urban (13)
- John Wain (42)
- Vernon Watkins (10)
- George G. Watson (20)
- John Weightman (86)
- Peter Wiles (12)
- Nicholas Snowden Willey (14)
- Angus Wilson (26)
- Richard Wollheim (12)
- Peregrine Worsthorne (15)
- David Wright (17)

== See also ==
- CIA and the Cultural Cold War, for the general concept
- Congress for Cultural Freedom – CIA program to fund European magazines
- Who Paid the Piper?, book by Frances Stonor Saunders published by Granta Books (UK) in 1999 (US edition published as The Cultural Cold War: The CIA and the World of Arts and Letters, The New Press, 2000)
