= Vilisova =

Vilisova Вилисова
- Settlement
- Location within Perm Krai Location within Russia
- Coordinates: 60°08′N 56°11′E
- Country: Russia
- Region: Perm Krai
- District: Cherdynsky District
- Time zone: UTC+5:00

Vilisova (Russian: Вилисова) is a rural locality (a settlement) in Cherdynsky District, Perm Krai, Russia. The population was 2 as of 2010. There is 1 street.

== Geography ==
Vilisova is located 122 km southwest of Cherdyn (the district's administrative centre) by road. Ust-Urolka is the nearest rural locality.
