= Clarence Brown (scholar) =

American literary scholar and translator

- Born: May 31, 1929
- Died: July 18, 2015 (aged 86)
- Education: Duke University; University of Michigan; Harvard University
- Employer: Princeton University
- Known for: literary scholar, cartoonist

Clarence Brown (May 31 1929 - July 18, 2015) was an American literary scholar, translator, writer, and cartoonist. A scholar and translator of 20th century Russian literature, he was recognized as one of the world's foremost experts on Russian poet Osip Mandelstam.

== Education ==
Brown earned an undergraduate degree in Classics from Duke University in 1950. After graduating from Duke, Brown served for 3 years in the U.S. Army's signals intelligence branch, the Army Security Agency. During his duties in the Agency, Brown completed the rigorous language training program at the Army Language School in Monterey, California and served in West Berlin during the Cold War as a Russian and German translator. He then earned a Master's degree in Linguistics from The University of Michigan and a PhD from Harvard University in 1962.

== Career ==
Brown joined Princeton University as an instructor in 1959 and became a professor in 1969. He taught at Princeton until his retirement in 1999. Initially a professor in the Department of Romance Languages, Brown joined the newly formed Program in Slavic Language and Literatures in 1967, and the Department of Comparative Literature in 1971. In researching his 1965 book The Prose of Osip Mandelstam, Brown travelled to the Soviet Union during the Cold War to interview Mandelstam's widow Nadezhda Mandelstam. Victims of Stalin's Great Purge in the 1930s, the Mandelstams had been exiled from Moscow. Osip was arrested in 1938 and died later that same year in the Soviet Gulags. Brown's corresponce with Nadezhda (herself a writer) over the course of one year when he lived in the Soviet Union, and his study of Mandelstam's papers culminated in the 1965 book. Before returning to the United States, Nadezhda gifted Osip's papers to Brown (the papers are currently housed in Princeton's Firestone Library). Brown's 1973 book Mandelstam was awarded the Christian Gauss Award in Literary Criticism and was a finalist for the National Book Award. His translation of Mandelstam's poems was anthologized in the book Mandelstam's Selected Poems which was a finalist for the National Book Award in the translation category in 1975. Current head of the Program in Slavic Language at Princeton Michael Wachtel described Brown as one of the pioneering scholars in the study of Mandelstam. Wachtel also stated that the Mandelstam papers, curated by Brown, is "the most valuable Russian literary archive outside Russia."

Brown was the editor of 20th Century Russian Reader, an anthology of 20th century Russian literature, where Brown translated Yury Olesha's novel Envy and Yevgeny Zamyatin's short story The Cave.

In addition to being a literary scholar and writer, Brown was also a professional cartoonist. From 1977 to 1984 he was the cartoons editor at the Saturday Review. His cartoons appeared in magazines including Esquire. Playboy, The Village Voice, and The Spectator in the United Kingdom. He wrote a column for The Times of Trenton in Trenton, New Jersey known as Ink Soup and would often end his columns with one of his cartoons. Brown was known to spontaneously draw cartoons on the blackboard to liven up his lectures and engage his students when teaching at Princeton.

== Personal life ==
Brown was married to Jacqueline Brown, who was a librarian at Princeton and also worked for the university's Office of Information Technology as the director of information services.
