= Pokcha, Perm Krai =

Pokcha Покча
- Selo
- Location within Perm Krai Location within Russia
- Coordinates: 60°27′N 56°27′E
- Country: Russia
- Region: Perm Krai
- District: Cherdynsky District
- Time zone: UTC+5:00

Pokcha (Russian: Покча) is a rural locality (a selo) in Cherdynsky District, Perm Krai, Russia. The population was 776 as of 2010. There are 6 streets.

== Geography ==
Pokcha is located 6 km north of Cherdyn (the district's administrative centre) by road. Cherdyn is the nearest rural locality.
