= Edward Pearce (journalist) =

English political journalist and writer

- Born: 28 March 1939; Wenlock, Shropshire, England
- Died: 9 February 2018 (aged 78)
- Education: St Peter's College, Oxford
- Occupations: Journalist, writer

Edward Robin Pearce (28 March 1939 – 9 February 2018) was an English political journalist and writer, known for being a leader writer for The Daily Telegraph and The Guardian, and writing a number of biographies of political figures.

== Personal life ==
Edward Pearce was born in Wenlock, Shropshire, in 1939, the son of Frank Pearce, a schoolmaster, and Harriet Johnson. He was brought up in Darlington, County Durham, attending Queen Elizabeth Grammar School, and then studied at St Peter's College, Oxford.

== Career ==
Embarking on a career in journalism, in 1977 he became a leader writer for the Daily Express. In 1979 he moved to The Daily Telegraph, where he wrote leaders and sketches on the Commons. In the 1980s Pearce contributed to Encounter; he claims the editors reassigned him from political writing to theatre criticism after he repeatedly used his Encounter column to criticise the Thatcher government. Pearce was strongly critical of the Soviet Union and welcomed its collapse, stating that under Stalin's rule the Soviet Union was "a mechanism for killing people distinguished from the Hitlerzeit only by motive". From 1987 to 1990, he was a columnist for The Sunday Times. Finally, he became a columnist for The Guardian and sketch writer for the New Statesman until 1995. At this period he also wrote frequently for the Yorkshire Post, and was a panelist on BBC Radio 4's The Moral Maze. In later years, he increasingly turned to the writing of biographical and historical studies of political figures.

Pearce's biography of Denis Healey, Denis Healey: A Life in Our Times, was described by Anthony Howard as " an impressive piece of work...[told] both vividly and well".

He twice stood unsuccessfully as a parliamentary candidate for the Labour Party, at Blackpool South in 1966 and at Richmond (Yorks) in February 1974. Pearce was an opponent of the First Gulf War.

== Hillsborough controversy ==
Pearce was criticised for writing an article in the aftermath of the 1989 Hillsborough disaster, at a time when a number of victims' funerals were taking place. In a Sunday Times article on 23 April 1989 he wrote the following:

"For the second time in half a decade a large body of Liverpool supporters has killed people ...the shrine in the Anfield goalmouth, the cursing of the police, all the theatricals, come sweetly to a city which is already the world capital of self-pity. There are soapy politicians to make a pet of Liverpool, and Liverpool itself is always standing by to make a pet of itself. 'Why us? Why are we treated like animals?' To which the plain answer is that a good and sufficient minority of you behave like animals."

Pearce declared that if South Yorkshire Police bore any responsibility, it was "for not realising what brutes they had to handle".

Professor Phil Scraton described Pearce's comments as amongst the "most bigoted and factually inaccurate" published in the wake of the disaster. A number of complaints were made to the Press Council concerning the article, but the Council ruled that it was unable to adjudicate on comment pieces, noting that while tragedy or disaster is not an occasion for writers to exercise gratuitous provocation, it was within the discretion of the editor to publish the piece.

On 26 April 2016 the verdict of the jury at the Hillsborough Inquests in Warrington was that all 96 victims had been unlawfully killed. The match commander, Chief Superintendent David Duckenfield, was found to have acted with gross negligence and failed in his duty of care to the victims. South Yorkshire Police and South Yorkshire Ambulance Service were found to have caused or contributed to the deaths.

The jury completely exonerated Liverpool supporters of any responsibility for the disaster. In doing so they re-iterated the findings of the Taylor Inquiry Interim report 1989 and those of the Hillsborough Independent Panel 2012.

His Tribune obituary described this example of his work, "... his trenchant attitude backfired spectacularly when he wrote an article wrongly blaming Liverpool fans for the Hillsborough disaster."

== Private life ==
Pearce married Deanna (née Singer) in 1966; the couple had a daughter, Cecily (b. 1975), a musician and teacher. In later life, he lived in Easingwold, near York.

Pearce died on 9 February 2018, aged 78.

== Works ==
- The Senate of Lilliput. Faber and Faber. 1983.
- Hummingbirds and Hyenas. Faber and Faber. 1985.
- Looking Down on Mrs.Thatcher. Hamish Hamilton. 1987.
- The Shooting Gallery. Hamish Hamilton. 1989.
- The Quiet Rise of John Major. Weidenfeld & Nicolson. 1991.
- Election Rides. Faber and Faber. 1992.
- Machiavelli's Children. Gollancz. 1993.
- The Lost Leaders: the best Prime Ministers we never had. Little, Brown. 1997.
- Lines of Most Resistance: The Lords, the Tories and Ireland, 1886–1914. Little, Brown. 1999.
- Denis Healey: a Life in Our Times. Little, Brown. 2002.
- Reform! The Fight for the 1832 Reform Act. Jonathan Cape. 2003.
- The Diaries of Charles Greville. Pimlico. 2005.
- The Great Man: Sir Robert Walpole: Scoundrel, Genius and Britain's First Prime Minister. Jonathan Cape. 2007.
- Pitt the Elder: Man of War. Bodley Head. 2010.
- The Golden Talking-Shop: The Oxford Union Debates Empire, World War, Revolution, and Women. Oxford University Press. 2016.

Pearce also wrote a play, Mr Wilkinson of York, about Tate Wilkinson. The play has been performed by amateur companies in Yorkshire.
