= Max Hayward =

British lecturer on and translator of Russian literature (1924–1979)

Harry Maxwell Hayward (28 July 1924, London – 18 March 1979, Oxford) was a British lecturer on and translator of Russian literature. He has been described as "the best and most prolific translator of Russian prose into English since Constance Garnett".

== Biography ==
After schooling in London and Liverpool, Hayward went to Magdalen College, Oxford in 1942 on a scholarship to study German. He soon dropped German for Russian, graduating with a first-class degree in 1945. He remained in Oxford for two more years before being proposed by Isaiah Berlin for a scheme for young scholars to be attached to the British Embassy in Moscow. He instead opted to study in 1946–7 at Charles University of Prague. The British Foreign Office then appointed him to a minor post at the Moscow embassy and he arrived in September 1947, where he would remain for two years. When required to translate for the British ambassador on a visit to Joseph Stalin in the Kremlin, Hayward was reportedly too dumb-struck to speak. As a result of his stay in the Soviet Union during the anti-cosmopolitan campaign, he embarked on a life-long project to promote dissident Soviet writers, particularly those of Jewish descent, outside the country.

Returning to Oxford in 1949, Hayward became lecturer in Russian, moving to Leeds University in 1952. In 1955 he returned to work at the British Embassy in Moscow, but his posting was cut short. In 1956 he was taken on by St Antony's College, Oxford. He supervised a number of students who went on to prominent careers, including Strobe Talbott and Sheila Fitzpatrick. He co-directed the Russian and East European Centre at St Antony's jointly with Harry Willetts during the 1960s and 1970s.

In 1959, he was a fellow at Harvard University's Russian Research Center. He also became affiliated to Columbia University's Russian Institute. In the summer of 1967, he stayed with Joseph Stalin's daughter and Soviet defector Svetlana Alliluyeva at her Central Intelligence Agency handler George F. Kennan's Cherry Orchard farm in East Berlin, Pennsylvania, having previously worked on an article about Boris Pasternak for The Atlantic with her, and allegedly became a romantic interest of hers.

Although Hayward published no academic monograph and his writings were widely scattered in introductions to books and articles in journals, he became a well-known authority on Russian literature. He was best known as a translator (often jointly with colleagues) of the works of Vladimir Mayakovsky, Isaac Babel, Nadezhda Mandelstam, Aleksandr Solzhenitsyn, Boris Pasternak, Andrei Sinyavsky, Andrei Amalrik, Anna Akhmatova and many others. He worked closely with Edward Kline's Chekhov Press in New York which published authors banned in the Soviet Union. In 1963, he co-edited a volume of proceedings from a St Antony's symposium on Literature and Revolution in Soviet Russia, 1917–62 jointly with the Polish-Jewish journalist Leopold Labedz.

His first full-scale translation, jointly with Manya Harari, was of Pasternak's novel Doctor Zhivago, a translation they began in 1957. Hayward had known Pasternak's family in Oxford and had once heard Pasternak read his poetry in Moscow in 1948.

He received the PEN Translation Prize in 1971.

He spent much of the last decade of his life on the island of Spetses in Greece. He died of cancer in Oxford, aged 54, in 1979.

St Antony's College established the Max Hayward Visiting Fellowship in his memory.

== Views ==
Hayward was a staunch anti-communist who frequently compared Stalinism to Nazism. Having visited Israel twice in 1975 and 1977, he expressed a concern about its survival as a state.

== See also ==
- Hope Against Hope by Nadezhda Mandelstam
- A Spy in the Archives: A Memoir of Cold War Russia by Shelia Fitzpatrick
