= Stalin Epigram =

1933 poem by Osip Mandelstam

The "Stalin Epigram", also known as "The Kremlin Highlander" (Russian: Кремлёвский горец) is a poem by the Russian poet Osip Mandelstam, written in November 1933. The poem describes the climate of fear in the Soviet Union.

Mandelstam read the poem only to a few friends, including Boris Pasternak and Anna Akhmatova. The poem played a role in his own arrest and the arrests of Akhmatova's son and husband, Lev Gumilev and Nikolay Punin.

The poem was almost the first case Genrikh Yagoda dealt with after becoming NKVD boss. Nikolai Bukharin visited Yagoda to intercede for Mandelstam, unaware of the nature of his "offense". According to Mandelstam's widow Nadezhda: "Yagoda liked M.'s poem so much that he even learned it by heart – he recited it to Bukharin – but he would not have hesitated to destroy the whole of literature, past, present and future, if he had thought it to his advantage. For people of this extraordinary type, human blood is like water."

We are living, but can’t feel the land where we stay,
More than ten steps away you can’t hear what we say.
But if people would talk on occasion,
They should mention the Kremlin Caucasian.

His thick fingers are bulky and fat like live-baits,
And his accurate words are as heavy as weights.
Cucaracha’s moustaches are screaming,
And his boot-tops are shining and gleaming.

But around him a crowd of thin-necked henchmen,
And he plays with the services of these half-men.
Some are whistling, some meowing, some sniffing,
He’s alone booming, poking and whiffing.

He is forging his rules and decrees like horseshoes –
Into groins, into foreheads, in eyes, and eyebrows.
Every killing for him is delight,
And Ossetian torso is wide.

The phrase "Ossetian torso" in the final line refers to the possible Ossetian ethnicity of Stalin's paternal grandfather.
