= John Gillett =

British film critic (1925–1995)

- Born: John Percy Gillett; 1925 (Note: His obituary in the Independent states that he was born on in Ealing, London on 28 September 1925 and died in London on 7 December 1995. The British Film Institute states that he was born on 28 August 1925 in Acton, London and died on 8 December 1995 in Tooting, London.); London, England
- Died: December 1995; Tooting, London, England
- Occupation: Film critic
- Awards: MBE 1995

John Gillett MBE (1925–1995) was a British film critic and researcher whose career at the British Film Institute spanned over 44 years. He was also a programmer for the National Film Theatre on the works of Buster Keaton, early Russian cinema and Japanese cinema, to name a few. He wrote film reviews for The Monthly Film Bulletin. With Ian Christie, he edited Futurism/Formalism/FEKS: 'Eccentrism' and Soviet Cinema 1918-1936. He was also an editor of Yasujiro Ozu: A Critical Anthology, with David Wilson.

He served on the international jury at the successful 15th Berlin International Film Festival in 1965 and as jury member in July 1994 at the 29th Karlovy Vary International Film Festival.

In June 1994 he received an MBE for services to the British Film Institute. That same year he was awarded the Japanese Order of the Sacred Treasure, Gold Rays with Rosette as recognition of his contribution to the appreciation of Japanese film and filmmakers. The certificate is just one of the items which form part of the John Gillett collection held by the British Film Institute.

A film tribute of John Gillett's life was made in 1996 by the British Film Institute, featuring Leslie Hardcastle, David Robinson and Sheila Whitaker.
