= George Urban =

Hungarian writer

- Born: Gyorgy Robert Ungar; 12 April 1921; Miskolc, Hungary
- Died: 3 October 1997 (aged 76)
- Education: Eötvös Loránd University
- Occupation: Writer

George Robert Urban (born Gyorgy Robert Ungar; 12 April 1921, in Miskolc, Hungary – 3 October 1997) was a Hungarian writer, best known as a broadcaster for Radio Free Europe (RFE).

== Early life ==
Gyorgy Robert Ungar was born on 12 April 1921 in Miskolc, Hungary. He attended Budapest University and left Hungary for the United Kingdom in 1948, where he took up further studies at London University. On 1 April 1955 he was naturalised as a British subject under the name George Robert Urban.

== Career ==
Urban began work for the BBC Hungarian service. He was a radio broadcaster for a number of years for the BBC World Service, leaving and joining RFE in 1960, and becoming its director for a period in the 1980s.

Urban is known also for his writing for Encounter magazine. His journalism and book writing drew heavily on long dialogues, in effect extended interviews, from his work at RFE, involving major intellectual and political figures who were prepared to engage with the Cold War. He also published a study of the Georgekreis, an early enthusiasm, and continuing shaper of his attitudes. In 1985, he signed a petition in support for the far-right paramilitary Contras (Nicaragua).

== Personal life ==
Urban was twice married.

== Works ==
- Kinesis and stasis; a study in the attitude of Stefan George and his circle to the musical arts (1962)
- The Sino-Soviet Conflict (1965) with Leo Labedz
- Toynbee on Toynbee: A Conversation between Arnold J. Toynbee and G. R. Urban (1974)
- Détente (1976)
- What is Eurocommunism? (1977) editor
- Eurocommunism: Its Roots and Future in Italy and Elsewhere (1978)
- Communist Reformation: Nationalism, Internationalism, and Change in the World Communist Movement (1979)
- Can the Soviet System Survive Reform?: Seven Colloquies About the State of Soviet Socialism Seventy Years After the Bolshevik Revolution (1989)
- End of Empire: The Demise of the Soviet Union (1992)
- Diplomacy and Disillusion at the Court of Margaret Thatcher: An Insider's View (1996)
- Radio Free Europe and the Pursuit of Democracy: My War Within the Cold War (1997)
