= Eric Rhode =

British writer

E. Rhode
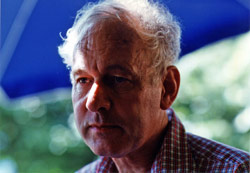
- Eric Rhode
- Born: May 10, 1934 (age 92); Genoa, Italy
- Occupations: Playwright, Journalist, Child Psychotherapist, Author
- Spouse: Maria Rhode (1974-present)
- Children: 4
- Website: http://ericrhode.co.uk/

Eric Rhode (born 10 May 1934) is a British writer on traditional cosmology, psychoanalysis and the history of the cinema.

== Life and work ==
After Rhode had worked as a critic, author and broadcaster on film and the arts, he undertook a personal psychoanalysis with Donald Meltzer and trained as a child psychotherapist at the Tavistock Clinic under Martha Harris. His later work addresses the interface between the structures discernible in dreams, children's play, aesthetics, ethnographic ritual, and philosophy.

As an undergraduate, Rhode directed plays at the Edinburgh festival; his own early play – The Pagoda Fugue - was aired on BBC Radio. His writing on film appeared in Sight and Sound, The Listener, Encounter, The Observer; he wrote on literature and art for New Statesman and The Financial Times, and on psychoanalytic topics for New Society and The Times Literary Supplement. During this period, Rhode wrote Tower of Babel (a collection of writing on the cinema) and also The History of the Cinema from its origins to 1970 for Penguin Books. He edited A game that must be lost, the posthumous papers by Adrian Stokes on psychoanalysis and art, and hosted a 70-minute programme on Adrian Stokes for BBC Radio 3.

After qualifying as a child psychotherapist, Rhode worked in the National Health Service at Paddington Green Child Guidance Clinic and in private practice, and studied with Kleinian psychoanalysts including Wilfred Bion. His first book on psychoanalysis was Of Birth and Madness, a London Times Book of the Week. It arose out of interviews he conducted in an inpatient unit for mothers with post-partum psychosis and their babies, but also addressed the historical and cultural evolution of attitudes towards pregnancy and childbirth and the psychiatric theories they inspired. His later books extend into aspects of traditional cosmology. He is married to the child psychotherapist Maria Rhode and lives in London.

== Bibliography ==
- Eric Rhode (1967) Tower of Babel. Chilton Books, 1967
- Eric Rhode (1976) A History of the Cinema from Its Origins to 1970. Allen Lane. ISBN 0-8090-5480-9
- Eric Rhode (1987) On Birth & Madness. Gerald Duckworth & Co Ltd. ISBN 0-7156-2291-9
- Eric Rhode (1990) The Generations of Adam. Free Association Books. ISBN 1-85343-130-3
- Eric Rhode (1994) Psychotic Metaphysics. Karnac Books. ISBN 1-85575-074-0
- Eric Rhode (1998) On Hallucination, Intuition, and the Becoming of "O". Esf. ISBN 1-883881-26-9
- Eric Rhode (2003) Plato's Silence. Apex One. ISBN 0-9543231-0-6
- Eric Rhode (2003) Notes on the Aniconic. Apex One. ISBN 0-9543231-1-4
- Eric Rhode (2008) Axis Mundi. Apex One. ISBN 0-9543231-2-2
- Eric Rhode (2015) On Revelation. Apex One. ISBN 978-0954323134
