= Leopold Labedz =

Leopold Łabędź
- Born: January 22, 1920; Simbirsk, Russian SFSR
- Died: March 22, 1993 (aged 73); London, United Kingdom
- Occupation: Journalist
- Known for: Championing human rights in the Eastern Bloc

Leopold Łabędź (22 January 1920 – 22 March 1993) was an anti-communist Anglo-Polish commentator on the Soviet Union.

Łabędź was born to a Polish Jewish doctor in Russia. The family soon returned to Warsaw and the young Łabędź decided to follow his father into the medical profession. He studied medicine in Paris. In 1939, he fled to the Soviet zone of occupation and was imprisoned by the Soviets in the Gulag.

He left the Soviet Union in 1942 as part of the Polish Army led by General Władysław Anders. After the war he studied at the University of Bologna before settling in London, where he studied at the London School of Economics. Strongly anti-communist, Łabędź edited Survey journal and headed the London office of Committee for the Defense of Workers known by its Polish abbreviation as KOR.

Łabędź often campaigned for the Solidarity union in Poland, and for political prisoners in the Soviet Union. Łabędź was one of Aleksandr Solzhenitsyn's principal champions in the West and often defended the Russian writer against the charge of antisemitism.

== Bibliography ==
- Laqueur, Walter & Leopold Labedz, eds. (1962). The future of Communist society. New York: Praeger.
- Polycentrism : the new factor in international communism edited by Walter Laqueur and Leopold Labedz, New York : Praeger, 1962.
- Revisionism : essays on the history of Marxist ideas edited by L. Labedz, London : G. Allen and Unwin, 1962.
- Literature and revolution in Soviet Russia, 1917-62, a symposium, edited by Max Hayward and Leopold Labedz, London, Oxford University Press, 1963.
- The Sino-Soviet conflict : eleven radio discussions by L. Labedz & George Urban, London : Bodley Head, 1965, 1964.
- International communism after Khrushchev edited by Leopold Labedz Cambridge, M.I.T. Press 1965.
- The State of Soviet Studies edited by Walter Laqueur and Leopold Labedz, Cambridge, Mass., M.I.T. Press 1965.
- Solzhenitsyn : a documentary record Harmondsworth, Middlesex, England; Baltimore : Penguin, 1974.
- "Chomsky Revisited", Encounter, July 1980, pp. 28–35.
- The use and abuse of Sovietology edited by Melvin J. Lasky New Brunswick, N.J., U.S.A. : Transaction Publishers, 1989.

Critical studies, reviews and biography

- Shils, Edward (January–February 1996). "Leopold Labedz". Intellectuals. Quadrant. 40 (1–2): 51–60.
- Shils, Edward, Portraits : A Gallery of Intellectuals, University Of Chicago Press 1997.
