= Jan Dawson =

Jan Dawson is an independent director from New Zealand and recipient of the New Zealand Order of Merit award.

== Biography ==
Dawson was born in Auckland and grew up in Blockhouse Bay and later North Shore. She attended university in Auckland and also worked part-time doing accounting work for real estate company Barfoot & Thompson and farm accounting in Palmerston North for a year. On returning to Auckland she completed her bachelor of commerce degree and worked at Price Waterhouse before moving to London. There, she worked in an investment bank and did auditing work for four years; she then moved to Vancouver, Canada and returned to New Zealand in 1986.

In New Zealand, Dawson has held a number of governance positions including chair and chief executive for KPMG New Zealand for five years until 2011, and board positions for Beca and Goodman Fielder. She has served as chair of Westpac New Zealand (until 2021) and deputy chair of Air New Zealand, and as a director of Meridian Energy and AIG Insurance New Zealand. Dawson is also on the University of Auckland council.

Dawson has had an interest in sailing since she was a child and co-owns a match racer; in 2007 she was the skipper of a team who won the Zenza Women's National Keelboat Championships. She was the president and board chair of Yachting New Zealand for nine years to October 2013, and also held positions for the international sailing federation World Sailing. In 2013, she won the Excellence in Sports Governance Award at the inaugural Women in Governance Awards ceremony. In 2015 she was awarded life membership of Yachting New Zealand.

In 2016, Dawson was made a Companion of the New Zealand Order of Merit for services to governance.
