= Osip Mandelstam =

Russian and Soviet poet (1891–1938)

- Осип Мандельштам
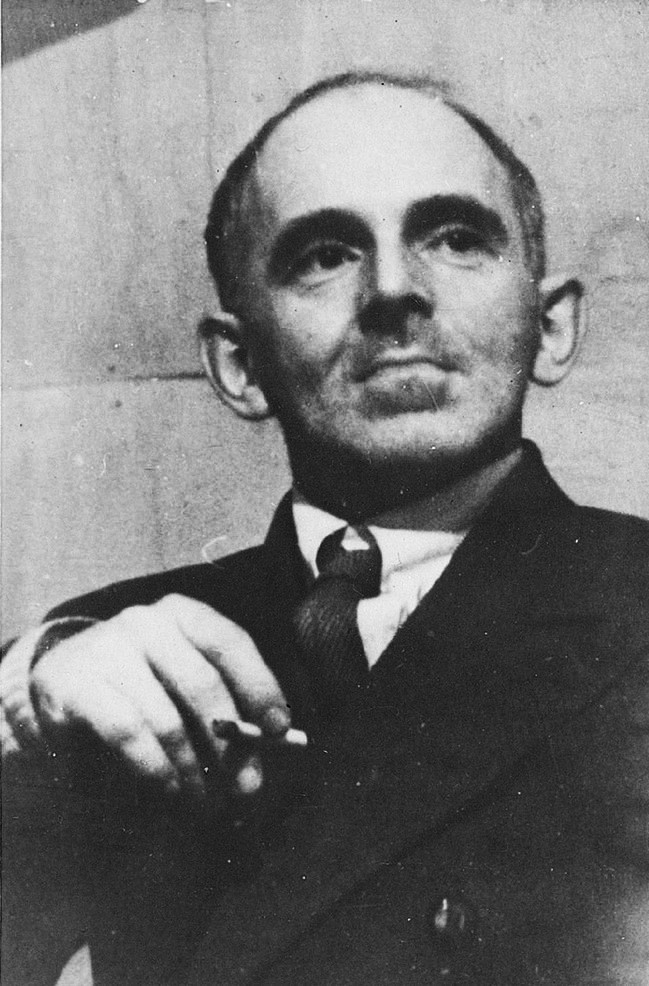
- Mandelstam in the 1930s
- Born: Osip Emilyevich Mandelstam; 14 January [O.S. 2 January] 1891; Warsaw, Congress Poland, Russian Empire
- Died: 27 December 1938 (aged 47); Transit Camp "Vtoraya Rechka" (near Vladivostok), Soviet Union
- Occupations: Poet, writer, essayist, translator
- Spouse: Nadezhda Mandelstam
- Relatives: Leon Mandelshtam
- Writing career
- Notable works: Stone; The Noise of Time; The Egyptian Stamp; The Fourth Prose; Voronezh Notebooks
- Movements: Acmeist poetry, modernism

Osip Emilyevich Mandelstam (Russian: Осип Эмильевич Мандельштам, IPA: [ˈosʲɪp ɨˈmʲilʲjɪvʲɪtɕ mənʲdʲɪlʲˈʂtam]; 14 January [O.S. 2 January] 1891 – 27 December 1938) was a Russian and Soviet poet. He was one of the foremost members of the Acmeist school.

Osip Mandelstam was arrested during the repressions of the 1930s and sent into internal exile with his wife, Nadezhda Mandelstam. Given a reprieve of sorts, they moved to Voronezh in southwestern Russia. In 1938, Mandelstam was arrested again and sentenced to five years in a corrective-labour camp in the Soviet Far East. He died that year at a transit camp near Vladivostok.

== Life and work ==
Mandelstam was born on 14 January 1891 in Warsaw, Congress Poland, Russian Empire, to a wealthy Polish-Jewish family. His father, a leather merchant by trade, was able to receive a dispensation freeing the family from the Pale of Settlement. Soon after Osip's birth, they moved to Saint Petersburg. In 1900, Mandelstam entered the prestigious Tenishev School. His first poems were printed in 1907 in the school's almanac. As a schoolboy, he was introduced by a friend to members of the illegal Socialist Revolutionary Party, including Mark Natanson, and the revolutionary Grigory Gershuni.

In April 1908, Mandelstam decided to enter the Sorbonne in Paris to study literature and philosophy, but he left the following year to attend the University of Heidelberg in Germany. In 1911, he decided to continue his education at the University of Saint Petersburg, from which Jews were excluded. He converted to Methodism and entered the university the same year. He did not complete a formal degree.

Mandelstam's poetry, acutely populist in spirit after the first Russian revolution in 1905, became closely associated with symbolist imagery. In 1911, he and several other young Russian poets formed the "Poets' Guild", under the formal leadership of Nikolai Gumilyov and Sergei Gorodetsky. The nucleus of this group became known as Acmeists. Mandelstam wrote the manifesto for the new movement: The Morning Of Acmeism (1913, published in 1919). In 1913 he published his first collection of poems, The Stone; it was reissued in 1916 under the same title, but with additional poems included.

== Political persecution and death ==
In 1922, Mandelstam and Nadezhda moved to Moscow. At this time, his second book of poems, Tristia, was published in Berlin. For several years after that, he almost completely abandoned poetry, concentrating on essays, literary criticism, memoirs The Noise Of Time, Feodosiya – both 1925; (Noise of Time 1993 in English) and small-format prose The Egyptian Stamp (1928). As a day job, he translated literature into Russian (19 books in 6 years), then worked as a correspondent for a newspaper.

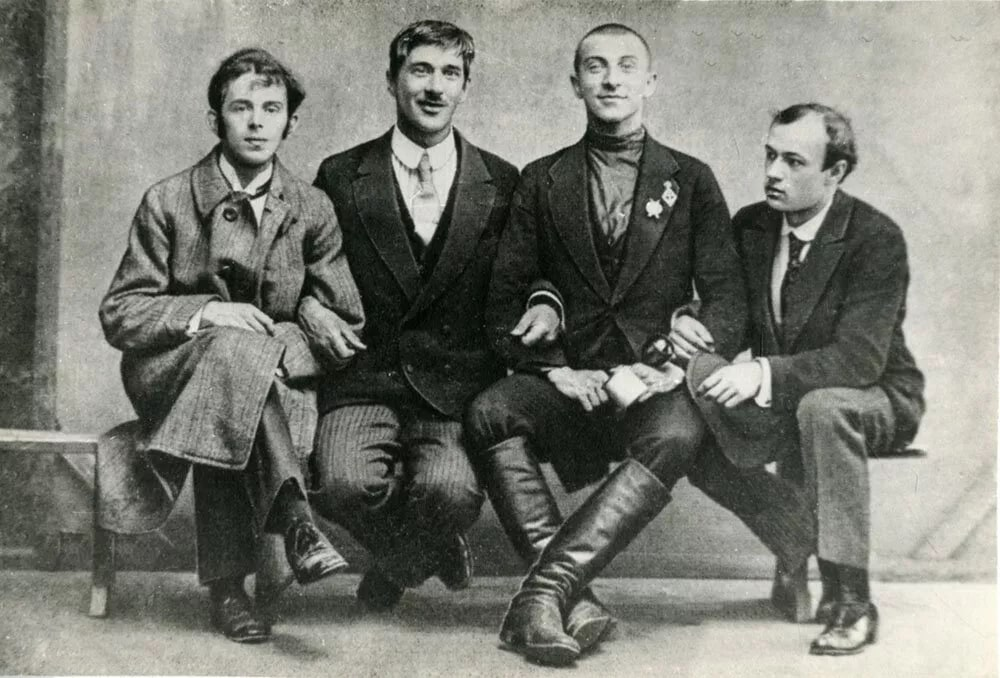
Silver Age poets Mandelstam, Chukovsky, Livshits and Annenkov in 1914. Photo of Karl Bulla

=== First arrest ===
In the autumn of 1933, Mandelstam composed the poem "Stalin Epigram", which he recited at a few small private gatherings in Moscow. The poem deliberately insulted the Soviet leader Joseph Stalin:

...
His thick fingers are bulky and fat like live-baits,
And his accurate words are as heavy as weights.
Cucaracha's moustaches are screaming,
And his boot-tops are shining and gleaming.
...

In the original version, the one that was handed in to the police, he called Stalin the "peasant slayer", as well as pointing out that he had fat fingers. Six months later, on the night of 16–17 May 1934, Mandelstam was arrested by three NKVD officers who arrived at his flat with a search warrant signed by Yakov Agranov. His wife hoped at first that this was over a fracas that had taken place in Leningrad a few days earlier, when Mandlestam slapped the writer Alexei Tolstoy because of a perceived insult to Nadezhda, but under interrogation he was confronted with a copy of the Stalin Epigram, and immediately admitted to being its author, believing that it was wrong in principle for a poet to renounce his own work. Neither he nor Nadezhda had ever risked writing it down, suggesting that one of the trusted friends to whom he recited it had memorised it, and handed a written copy to the police. It has never been established who it was.

Mandelstam anticipated that insulting Stalin would carry the death penalty, but Nadezhda and Anna Akhmatova started a campaign to save him, and succeeded in creating "a kind of special atmosphere, with people fussing and whispering to each other." The Lithuanian ambassador in Moscow, Jurgis Baltrušaitis warned delegates at a conference of journalists that the regime appeared to be on the verge of killing a renowned poet. Boris Pasternak – who disapproved of the tone of the Epigram – nonetheless appealed to the eminent Bolshevik, Nikolai Bukharin, to intervene. Bukharin, who had known the Mandelstams since the early 1920s and had frequently helped them, approached the head of the NKVD, and wrote a note to Stalin.

=== Exile ===
On 26 May, Mandelstam was sentenced neither to death, nor even the Gulag, but to three years' exile in Cherdyn in the Northern Ural, where he was accompanied by his wife. This escape was looked upon as a "miracle" – but the strain of his interrogation had driven Mandelstam to the verge of insanity. He later wrote that "at my side, my wife did not sleep for five nights" – but when they arrived at Cherdyn, she fell asleep, in the upper floor of a hospital, and he attempted suicide by throwing himself out of the window. His brother, Alexander, appealed to the police for his brother to be given proper psychiatric care, and on 10 June, there was a second "miracle", which banished Mandelstam from the twelve largest Soviet cities, but otherwise allowed him to choose his place of exile.

Mandelstam and his wife chose Voronezh, possibly, partly, because the name appealed to him. In April 1935, he wrote a four line poem that included the pun – Voronezh – blazh', Voronezh – voron, nozh meaning 'Voronezh is a whim, Voronezh – a raven, a knife.'. Just after their arrival, Boris Pasternak received a phone call from Stalin – his only conversation with the dictator, in which Stalin wanted to know whether Mandelstam really was a talented poet. "He's a genius, isn't he?" he is reputed to have asked Pasternak.

During these three years, Mandelstam wrote a collection of poems known as the Voronezh Notebooks, which included the cycle Verses on the Unknown Soldier.

Actually, the fact that Stalin had given an order to "isolate and preserve" Mandelstam meant that he was safe from further persecution, temporarily. In Voronezh, he was even granted a face-to-face meeting with the local head of the NKVD, Semyon Dukelsky, who told him "write what you like", and turned down an offer by Mandelstam to send in every poem he wrote to police headquarters. After that meeting, NKVD agents ceased shadowing the couple. There is a story, possibly apocryphal, that Mandelstam even rang Dukelsky to recite poetry over the phone.

=== Second arrest and death ===
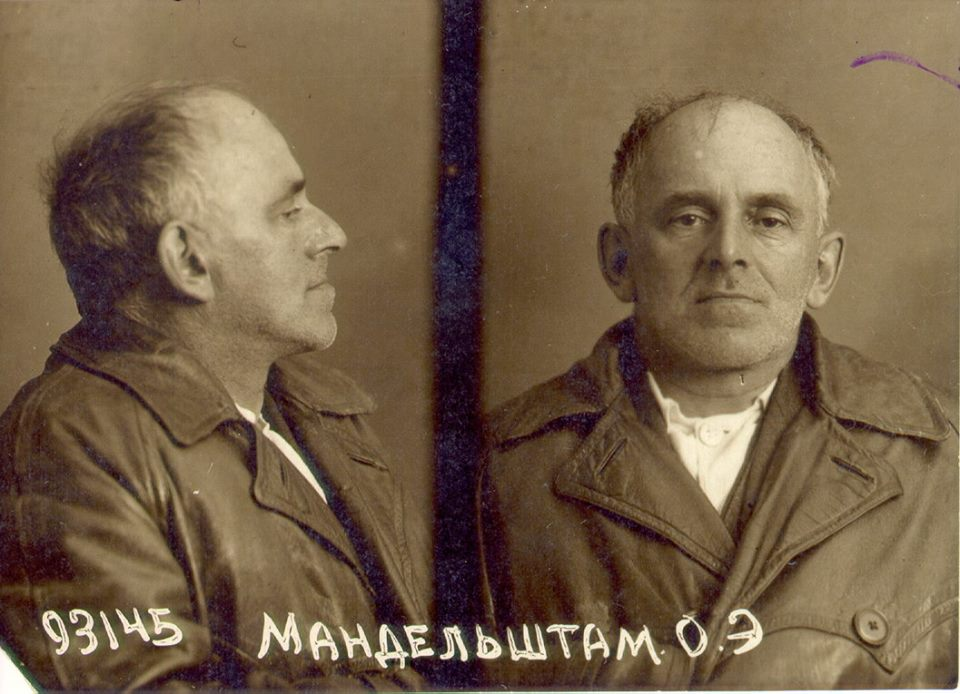
NKVD photo after the second arrest, 1938

Mandelstam's three-year period of exile ended in May 1937, when the Great Purge was under way. The previous winter, he had forced himself to write his "Ode to Stalin", hoping it would protect him against further persecution. The couple no longer had the right to live in Moscow, so lived in nearby Kalinin (Tver), and visited the capital, where they relied on friends to put them up. In the spring of 1938, Mandelstam was granted an interview with the head of the Writers' Union Vladimir Stavsky, who granted him a two-week holiday for two in a rest home outside Moscow. This was a trap. The previous month, on 16 March – the day after the Mandelstams' former protector, Nikolai Bukharin had been sentenced to death – Stavsky had written to the head of the NKVD, Nikolay Yezhov, denouncing Mandelstam. Getting him out of Moscow made it possible to arrest him without setting off a reaction. He was arrested while on holiday, on 5 May (ref. camp document of 12 October 1938, signed by Mandelstam), and charged with "counter-revolutionary activities".

Four months later, on 2 August 1938, Mandelstam was sentenced to five years in correction camps. He arrived at the Vtoraya Rechka (Second River) transit camp near Vladivostok in Russia's Far East. From the Vladperpunkt transit camp he sent his last letter to his brother and his wife, writing: I'm in Vladivostok, SVITL, barracks 11. I got 5 years for K.R.D. [counterrevolutionary activity] by the decision of the OSO. From Moscow, left from Butyrka on September 9, arrived on October 12. Health is very poor. Exhausted to the extreme. Have lost weight, almost unrecognizable. But I don't know if there is any sense in sending clothes, food and money. Try it, all the same. I'm freezing without proper things.

On 27 December 1938, three weeks before his 48th birthday, Osip Mandelstam died in a transit camp of typhoid fever. His death was described later in a short story "Cherry Brandy" by Varlam Shalamov, who notes that his fellow inmates concealed his death for two days so they could continue to collect his rations. His body lay unburied until spring, along with the other deceased. Then the entire "winter stack" was buried in a mass grave.

Mandelstam's own prophecy was fulfilled: "Only in Russia is poetry respected, it gets people killed. Is there anywhere else where poetry is so common a motive for murder?" Nadezhda wrote memoirs about her life and times with her husband in Hope against Hope (1970) and Hope Abandoned. She also managed to preserve a significant part of Mandelstam's unpublished work.

== Marriage and family ==
In 1916, Mandelstam was passionately involved with the poet Marina Tsvetayeva. According to her biographer, "Of the many love affairs with men that Marina embarked upon with such intensity during this period, it was probably the only one that was physically consummated." Mandelstam was said to have had an affair with the poet Anna Akhmatova. She insisted throughout her life that their relationship had always been a very deep friendship, rather than a sexual affair. In the 1910s, he was in love, secretly and unrequitedly, with a Georgian princess and St. Petersburg socialite Salomea Andronikova, to whom Mandelstam dedicated his poem "Solominka" (1916).

In 1922, Mandelstam married Nadezhda Mandelstam in Kiev, Ukraine, where she lived with her family, but the couple settled in Moscow. He continued to be attracted to other women, sometimes seriously. Their marriage was threatened by his falling in love with other women, notably Olga Vaksel in 1924–25 and Mariya Petrovykh in 1933–34. Nadezha Mandelstam formed a lifelong friendship with Anna Akhmatova, who was a guest in the Mandelstam's apartment when he was arrested for the first time, but complained that she could never be friendly with Tsvetayeva, partly because "I had decided on Akhmatova as 'top' woman poet". She also complained that Tsvetayeva could not take her eyes off her husband, and that "she accused me of being jealous of her."

During Mandelstam's years of imprisonment in 1934–38, Nadezhda accompanied him into exile. Given the real danger that all copies of Osip's poetry would be destroyed, she worked to memorize his entire corpus, as well as to hide and preserve select paper manuscripts, all the while dodging her own arrest. In the 1960s and 1970s, as the political climate thawed, she was largely responsible for arranging clandestine republication of Mandelstam's poetry.

== Posthumous reputation and influence ==
- Dutch composer Marjo Tal (1915–2006) set several of Mandelstam's poems to music.
- In 1956, during the Khrushchev thaw, Mandelstam was rehabilitated and exonerated from the charges brought against him in 1938.
- The Canadian Broadcasting Corporation aired Hope Against Hope, a radio dramatization about Mandelstam's poetry based on the book of the same title by Nadezhda Mandelstam, on 1 February 1972. The script was written by George Whalley, a Canadian scholar and critic, and the broadcast was produced by John Reeves.
- In 1977, a minor planet, 3461 Mandelshtam, discovered by Soviet astronomer Nikolai Stepanovich Chernykh, was named after him.
- That same year, American author Saul Bellow mentioned Mandelstam in the annual Jefferson Lecture for the National Endowment for the Arts. Bellow claimed that Mandelstam "carried a pocket edition of Dante's Widow just in case he was arrested, not at home but in the street."
- On 28 October 1987, during the administration of Mikhail Gorbachev, Mandelstam was also exonerated from the 1934 charges and thus fully rehabilitated.
- In 1998, a monument was put up in Vladivostok in his memory.
- In 2020, Noemi Jaffe, a Brazilian writer, wrote a book about his persecution and how his wife managed to preserve his work, called "What she whispers" (O que ela sussurra).
- In 2021, the album Sokhrani moyu rech' navsegda (Russian: «Сохрани мою речь навсегда», lit. 'Save My Words Forever') was released in honor of the 130th anniversary of Mandelstam's birth. The album is a compilation of songs based on Mandelstam's poems by artists such as Oxxxymiron, Leonid Agutin, Ilya Lagutenko, Shortparis, and Noize MC.
- The California band Persephone's Bees took their name from Mandelstam's poem titled "Возьми на радость из моих ладоней..." ("Take for joy from my outstretched palms..."), written in November 1920.

== Bibliography ==
=== Prose ===
- The Noise Of Time (1925, collection of autobiographical sketches)
- The Egyptian Stamp (1928, short novel)
- The Fourth Prose (1930)
- Journey to Armenia (1933, collection of travel sketches)

=== Poetry collections ===
- Stone (1913/1916/1923)
- Tristia (1922)
- Second Book (1923)
- Poems 1921–1925 (1928)
- Poems (1928)
- Moscow Notebooks (1930–34)
- Voronezh Notebooks (1934–37)

=== Essays ===
- On Poetry (1928)
- Conversation about Dante (1933; published in 1967)

=== Selected translations ===
- Ahkmatova, Mandelstam, and Gumilev (2013) Poems from the Stray Dog Cafe, translated by Meryl Natchez, with Polina Barskova and Boris Wofson, hit & run press, (Berkeley, CA) ISBN 0936156066
- Mandelstam, Osip and Struve, Gleb (1955) Sobranie sočinenij (Collected works). New York OCLC 65905828
- Mandelstam, Osip (1973) Selected Poems, translated by David McDuff, Rivers Press (Cambridge) and, with minor revisions, Farrar, Straus and Giroux (New York)
- Mandelstam, Osip (1973) The Complete Poetry of Osip Emilevich Mandelstam, translated by Burton Raffel and Alla Burago. State University of New York Press (USA)
- Mandelstam, Osip (1973) The Goldfinch. Introduction and translations by Donald Rayfield. The Menard Press
- Mandelstam, Osip (1974). Selected Poems, translated by Clarence Brown and W. S. Merwin. NY: Atheneum, 1974.
- Mandelstam, Osip (1976) Octets 66–76, translated by Donald Davie, Agenda vol. 14, no. 2, 1976.
- Mandelstam, Osip (1977) 50 Poems, translated by Bernard Meares with an Introductory Essay by Joseph Brodsky. Persea Books (New York)
- Mandelstam, Osip (1980) Poems. Edited and translated by James Greene. (1977) Elek Books, revised and enlarged edition, Granada/Elek, 1980.
- Mandelstam, Osip (1981) Stone, translated by Robert Tracy. Princeton University Press (USA)
- Mandelstam, Osip (1991) The Moscow Notebooks, translated by Richard & Elizabeth McKane. Bloodaxe Books (Newcastle upon Tyne, UK) ISBN 978-1-85224-126-1
- Mandelstam, Osip (1993, 2002) The Noise of Time: Selected Prose, translated by Clarence Brown, Northwestern University Press; Reprint edition ISBN 0-8101-1928-5
- Mandelstam, Osip (1996) The Voronezh Notebooks, translated by Richard & Elizabeth McKane. Bloodaxe Books (Newcastle upon Tyne, UK) ISBN 978-1-85224-205-3
- Mandelstam, Osip (1991) The Moscow & Voronezh Notebooks, translated by Richard & Elizabeth McKane. Bloodaxe Books (Tarset, Northumberland, UK) ISBN 978-1-85224-631-0
- Mandlestam, Osip (2012) "Stolen Air", translated by Christian Wiman. HarperCollins (USA)
- Mandelstam, Osip (2018) Concert at a Railway Station. Selected Poems, translated by Alistair Noon. Shearsman Books (Bristol)
- Mandelstam, Osip (2022) The Voronezh Workbooks, translated by Alistair Noon, Shearsman Books (Swindon)
- Mandelstam, Osip (2022) Occasional and Joke Poems, translated by Alistair Noon, Shearsman Books (Swindon)
- Mandelstam, Osip (2021) Black Earth: Selected Poems and Prose, translated by Peter France, New Directions (New York)
- Mandelstam, Osip (2023) Tristia, translated by Thomas de Waal, Arc Publications (Todmorden)

== Reviews ==
- McCarey, Peter (1982), review of Osip Mandelstam's "Stone" translated by Robert Tracy and Poems chosen and translated by James Greene, in Murray, Glen (ed.), Cencrastus No. 8, Spring 1982, p. 49, ISSN 0264-0856
