= Leon Mandelshtam =

Russian Hebraist, poet, and educator (1819–1889)

- Леон Иосифович Мандельштам
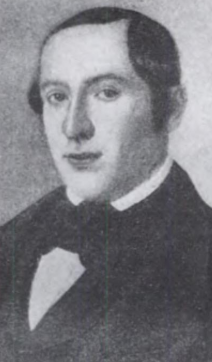
- Born: Arye Leib Mandelshtam; 1819; New Zhagory, Vilna province
- Died: August 31, 1889 (aged 69–70); Neva River
- Education: Moscow University; St. Petersburg University
- Occupations: Writer and Translator
- Relatives: Osip Mandelstam
- Writing career
- Language: Russian

Leon Mandelshtam or Mandelstam (Russian: Лео́н (Арье-Лейб) Ио́сифович Мандельшта́м; 1819 – August 31, 1889) was a Russian Jewish Maskil who worked for the Russian Ministry of Public Education and wrote and translated numerous works in the Russian language. He worked to reform Jewish education and was the first to translate several Jewish religious works, like the Torah, into Russian.

== Biography ==
Mandelshtam was born in 1819 in the town of New Zhagory, Vilna province to a Jewish family, a distant cousin to Osip Mandelshtam. His father Joseph traveled across Europe for business and was a reader of Ha-Meassef while his mother was a housewife. Such family life contributed to Mandelshtam learning Hebrew, German and French. He also tried his hand at writing in the spirit of the then fashionable romantic movement. At the age of sixteen, he began to study the Russian language in depth and began writing not only prose but also poetry, he would eventually write a small book of these early poems which he kept with him.

=== University Years ===
Despite the modern education, Mandelshtam's family was generally traditional and saw to ensure his marriage by the age of 17. He divorced soon after though, and moved to Vilna. He sought to attend the university there but found it closed due to a recent Polish Uprising. Undeterred and still seeking higher education, Mandelshtam began preparing for university entrance exams while sending out requests from the Russian government to attend university. Despite failing his first attempt, his next attempt saw better results with Count Sergey Uvarov giving explicit approval of his right to attend Moscow University and St. Petersburg University. Mandelshtam was recorded as the first Jewish student to attend Moscow University in 1840. During his time in school he would assist Count Uvarov as a translator for negotiations with the rabbinic authorities over the future of Jewish education. He would also be brought on to assist Count Uvarov's subordinate, Max Lilienthal, as needed.

In that same year, Mandelshtam would go out to Minsk and meet with a prominent Orthodox Jewish cantor, Sender Poliachek. He and the cantor would begin arguing about the benefits and costs of assimilation.

Mandelshtam would ultimately find the university inhospitable, due in large part to antisemitism, leading to his transfer to St. Petersburg University's faculty of law where he would graduate in 1844. This would make him the first Jew to graduate from a Russian university.

=== An 'Expert Jew' ===
After graduating, Mandelshtam traveled across Europe to continue his philological training. Upon returning to Russia, Count Uvarov requested that Mandelshtam take a post at his ministry, the Ministry of Public Education, as an “expert Jew” to replace Lilienthal, who had just left to the United States. This position required him to help design Jewish education reforms in Russia to help Russify the Jewish minority and promote assimilation. He would receive permission from the Ministry in 1846 to begin publishing a periodical, but it never saw publication.

In the autumn of 1847, Mandelshtam's first schools, in Odessa and Vilna, opened. In 1848, the Tsemah Tzedek wrote to Mandelshtam demanding that the new government schools should teach Jewish subjects based on traditional approaches rather than the modernized curriculum. In order to preserve some sense of tradition, some concessions were given. By 1855, 71 of these schools had been opened. The Tsemah Tzedek would start a new campaign, petitioning Mandelshtam and another maskil, Moses Berlin, to preserve traditional perspectives in the government schools. His work would see Mandelshtam face heavy backlash from the Jewish community who accused him of not keeping fast days or praying regularly. It would cause some controversy in the Chabad world that the Tsemah Tzedek eventually wrote back to Mandelshtam and praised the maskil.

Through the 1850s, Mandelshtam published a series of articles arguing against the accusations of backwardness levied against Russian Jewry. He argued that the Jews were the most literate people of Europe with a long history of scientific study and philosophical study. In 1857, he left his position with the Ministry of Public Education and would begin a series of numerous trips to Europe.

Mandelshtam would translate the Torah into Russian in a diglot format in 1862. The work had the Hebrew on one page and a Russian direct translation sitting opposite it. He did not publish it in Russia out of fear of upsetting the Synod, which had not yet issued its translation of the Pentateuch. He left the Russian Empire for a brief period in 1865, opting to move to Germany, during which time he published his translation in Berlin. This translation was met with steep pushback from Orthodox Jewish rabbis.

In the last years of his life Mandelshtam found himself bankrupt from his self publications and impoverished, with little notoriety.

While travelling on a boat to cross the Neva in St. Petersburg, Mandelshtam died without explanation on August 31, 1889. Due to having no documents on his person he was buried without being identified. Once he was noticed as missing the janitor of the building he was living was contacted and the effects of the body were used to identify his corpse. On September 6 Mandelshtam was exumed and reburied in Preobrazhenskoye Jewish Cemetery.

== Written Works ==
Mandelshtam works included an early translation of the Torah, possibly the first, into Russian as well as translations of many Psalms. He also produced Russian to Hebrew and Hebrew to Russian dictionaries.

Rejected by his family for seeking secular education, Mandelshtam would publish a book of poems in Russian about the dreams and doubts of Jewish youth who sought to break away from their communities and pursue secular education. His first publication was a collection of his poems that were compiled in 1840 and approved by the censors for publishing in June 1841, notably being the first collection of Russian poetry written by a Jewish author.

While working for the Russian Ministry of Public Education in the 1840's, Mandelshtam published several textbooks in the Russian language.

In 1864 Mandelshtam published a dramatic prose story titled 'The Jewish Family' at his own expense via a publisher in Germany. The Russian government censors viewed its promotion of Jewish life as reprehensible and did not allow its distribution in Russia until a abridged version was released in 1872.

In 1880, a collection of Mandelshtam's poems in German, "Voices in the Desert: Selected Jewish Songs," was published in London.

Mandelshtam would also become the first writer to translate Pushkin to Hebrew.
