= Nadezhda Mandelstam =

Russian educator and writer (1899–1980)

- Надежда Мандельштам
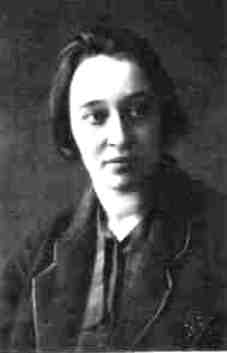
- Mandelstam in 1925
- Born: Nadezhda Khazina; October 30, 1899; Saratov, Russian Empire
- Died: December 29, 1980 (aged 81); Moscow, Russian SFSR, Soviet Union
- Resting place: Kuntsevo Cemetery
- Spouse: Osip Mandelstam

Nadezhda Yakovlevna Mandelstam (Russian: Надежда Яковлевна Мандельштам, IPA: [nɐˈdʲeʐdə ˈjakəvlʲɪvnə mənʲdʲɪlʲˈʂtam]; née Khazina [Хазина]; 30 October [O.S. 18 October] 1899 – 29 December 1980) was a Soviet writer, translator, educator, linguist, and memoirist.

She is the author of two memoirs about her life with her husband Osip Mandelstam and the repressive Stalinist regime they faced: Hope Against Hope (1970) and Hope Abandoned (1974), both first published in the West in English, translated by Max Hayward.

== Early life and education ==
Nadezhda Yakovlevna Khazina was born on October 30, 1899 in Saratov, southern Russia, in a middle-class Jewish family.

Her father Yakov Arkadyevich Khazin was a sworn attorney, baptized Jew, the son of Khaim-Aron Khazin, a Yampil Cantonist. Her father was an educated man, with an educational background in mathematics and law. At a young age, he chose law and made enough profit from it to support a family. Her mother Vera Yakovlevna Khazina was among the first group of women in the Soviet Union to complete training as a medical doctor.

According to her own memoirs, her parents were advised by a priest to name her Nadezhda (hope), as her family was having financial problems when she was born. After her birth, the priest's prediction "came true", as her family moved to Kiev (now in Ukraine) for her father's work and he started to make money again.

Nadezhda Mandelstam was the youngest of four children. Her siblings were her brothers Aleksandr (1892–1920) and Evgeniy (1893–1974), and the oldest, her sister Anna (1888–1938). Both brothers volunteered for the White Army, while Aleksandr supposedly died at the age of 28, Evgeniy lived to the age of 80. Evgeniy was both born and died exactly 6 years before his sister Nadezhda.

Her family was wealthy enough to travel, and Nadezhda was frequently taken on trips to Europe as a child, as she would often fall ill. Between 1905 and 1914, she travelled to Switzerland, living there for 2 years, as well as Germany, France, Italy, and Sweden. Thanks to these trips, she learned French and German, as well as English.

The family did not practice Judaism, and kept Russian Orthodox holidays. Later they converted to Christianity. The family moved to Kiev, for her father's work, and the greater cultural and educational opportunities of the larger city. There she attended school. After gymnasium (secondary school), Nadezhda studied art. Raised without the constraints of traditional schooling or societal expectations, she thrived under the nurturing and indulgent care of her parents. Her father, especially, fostered her rebellious nature, shielding her from the rigid patriarchy and encouraging her to pursue her own interests, which resulted in her rejection of conventional ideals of femininity.

== Personal life ==
During her youth, Nadezhda studied at the studio of avant-garde artist Alexandra Ekster, immersing herself in modernist artistic circles. She rejected the idealized image of women upheld by high society, embracing sexual frankness, casual relationships, and friendships marked by ease and companionship. She viewed her generation as responsible for dismantling the institution of marriage, seeing this as an achievement. In her perspective, casual relationships often resulted in stronger unions than conventional marriages built on lies.

Despite her disinterest in having children, anecdotal accounts from Anaida Hudaverdyan suggest that both she and Osip Mandelstam deeply desired children. Hudaverdyan also indicates that she specifically wished for a son.

According to her contemporaries, Nadezhda’s appearance and behavior defied convention. In Irina Odoyevtseva’s memoirs, she describes Nadezhda's look during one of their visits to the Mandelstam house with her husband Georgiy Ivanov, Russian poet and essayist. Nadezhda's attire coming home from the store is described as "wearing a brown suit, with a short haircut and a cigarette between her teeth", which was unseen for women at the time. Later, Nadezhda Mandelstam refutes this version in her memoirs, saying that she was actually wearing regular striped pyjamas.

Odoyevtseva reports Ivanov being taken aback seeing Nadezhda Mandelstam in this attire, mistaking her for a young man and being unsure whether or not its appropriate to kiss her hand. Even her husband Osip Mandelstam was unapproving of her style, reportedly telling his wife to "stop stealing his suits, just as he doesn't fit in her dresses."

Irina Odoyevtseva comments on this, saying that it is actually Nadezhda Mandelstam, who is "the first woman to wear pants," rather than Marlene Dietrich, who only years later would challenge traditional women’s fashion in this way. Her style was not merely an aesthetic choice but part of a broader revolutionary approach to life.

== Marriage and friendships ==
=== Relationship with Osip Mandelstam ===
Nadezhda was the wife of the Russian poet, translator, essayist, literary scholar Osip Mandelstam, who died in 1938 in a transit camp to the gulag of Siberia.

Nadezhda first met the poet Osip Mandelstam at the nightclub "Khlam" in Kiev on May 1, 1919. The literary critic and poet Alexander Deich, who witnessed their meeting, recorded in his diary that their connection was immediate: Osip’s focus was entirely on Nadezhda as he read his poetry. By May 23, 1919, Deich noted that the two were already an inseparable couple, their marriage took place sometime from 1921 to 1922. However, they were forced to live apart for a year and a half. Despite this separation, their bond endured, defined by a sense of ease and inevitability. A letter from Osip, written from Feodosia, reveals his emotional dependence on Nadezhda. Their time apart ended in March 1921 when Osip returned to Kiev and took Nadezhda with him.

They lived in Ukraine at first, but moved to Petrograd in 1922. Later they lived in Moscow, and Georgia. During the early years of their marriage, Osip distanced Nadezhda from broader social circles, guiding her toward a deeper appreciation of poetry.

Though they loved each other, their relationship had its challenges. Osip had an affair with poet Olga Vaksel, to whom he dedicated 4 poems. After learning of the affair, Nadezhda threatened to leave, but Osip worked to rebuild their relationship. Vaksel's personal memoirs, written before her suicide, describe her relationship with Osip with a mix of admiration and ambivalence. Vaksel also claimed that Nadezhda attempted to "seduce" her but stated that she remained indifferent to both men and women romantically. Despite the affair, Vaksel expressed sympathy for Nadezhda, seeing her as a strong woman navigating a difficult relationship.

Within the Mandelstam household, there existed what Russian historian Emma Gerstein called a "cult of ugliness," where physical imperfections were not hidden but acknowledged and even celebrated. This fostered an atmosphere of openness and free communication, bringing the Mandelstam household closer together.

==== Osip Mandelstam's arrest ====
Osip Mandelstam was arrested in 1934 for his poem entitled "Stalin Epigram" and exiled to Cherdyn, in Perm Oblast; Nadezhda went with him. Later, the sentence was lightened and they were allowed to move to Voronezh in southwestern Russia, but were still banished from the largest cities, which were considered artistic and cultural centers.

After Osip Mandelstam's second arrest in May 1938 and his subsequent death at the transit camp "Vtoraya Rechka" near Vladivostok that year, Nadezhda Mandelstam led an almost nomadic life. Given the repression of the times, she tried to dodge an expected arrest, and frequently changed places of residence and took only temporary jobs. On at least one occasion, in Kalinin, the NKVD came for her the day after she had fled.

Despite living in poverty and under constant fear due to the potential discovery of Osip’s poetry, which criticized the Soviet regime, their relationship endured. Osip’s journey to Armenia and his return to writing poetry marked a period of happiness between them, even as they faced increasing persecution. Nadezhda later described her early "submission" to Osip, comparing herself to a "horse in the hands of a trainer." While he initially played a dominant role, over time, their dynamic shifted—he became more of a protector and friend. Though she had opportunities to leave, she repeatedly chose to stay.

Osip dictated his "The Noise of Time" (Шум Времени) to her in fragmented bursts, often pacing alone for long stretches before suddenly demanding that she write down his words. Sometimes he dictated so rapidly that she struggled to keep up; at other times, the process was slower. He expected her to fill in forgotten words instinctively, a task that became increasingly difficult.

As her mission in life, she worked to preserve her husband's poetic heritage, with the goal of publication one day. Nadezhda took it upon herself to preserve his poetry. Knowing that written copies would be too dangerous, she committed his works to memory, ensuring that his words would not be lost.

As time passed, Nadezhda began to panic when she realized she was forgetting lines of his poetry. In a letter to her close friend Boris Kuzin, she expressed her distress over losing memories of his poems.

Even as their lives became more precarious, Nadezhda remained by Osip’s side. His death in the gulag in 1938 marked a turning point, but she continued to preserve his legacy, ensuring that his poetry and their shared history would not be erased. Many years later, she was able to work with other writers to have Osip Mandelstam's works published.

=== Anna Akhmatova ===
Nadezhda Mandelstam was practically unfamiliar with Anna Akhmatova before meeting her in Tsarskoye Selo. Their first meeting took place in the fall of 1924, after Nadezhda and Osip had moved from Moscow to Leningrad. That same autumn, while Osip was in Moscow to bring furniture for their new home on Morskaya Street, Akhmatova came to visit.

Despite this encounter, Nadezhda’s relationship with Akhmatova remained distant, characterized more by admiration than warmth. Unlike her genuine emotional connections with other women, such as Vasilisa Shklovskaya, Nadezhda never expressed a similar affection for Akhmatova. Instead, there was an underlying tension in their interactions. She subtly suggested a sense of discomfort and implied that she felt more tolerated than embraced. This unease extended to her views on Akhmatova’s poetry. Nadezhda was critical of Akhmatova’s early love poems, believing they reflected too much ego and self-regard.

For Nadezhda, rejecting conventional ideas of femininity was a kind of liberation. She believed that her lack of traditional beauty made her "free" and that this freedom allowed her to reject societal expectations of womanhood. In contrast, she saw Akhmatova as trapped in a false "ladylikeness," where traditional femininity overshadowed her true self. This perspective was challenged by Lydia Chukovskaia, who disagreed with Nadezhda’s belief that femininity hindered artistic or moral authority. She framed their differences within a broader question about women’s roles in literature, suggesting that femininity, if not consciously restrained, could obscure artistic and moral authority.

Nadezhda’s memoirs also subtly hint at a complex triangular dynamic between herself, Osip, and Akhmatova. She suggests that she sometimes felt like an outsider, the "odd one out" in their interactions. Despite this, there were moments of shared understanding between the two women. On December 27, 1963, the 25th anniversary of Osip’s death, Akhmatova wrote Nadezhda a letter acknowledging their shared grief and history. Nadezhda’s response revealed the depth of her reliance on Akhmatova’s companionship and their common bond in poetry. However, after Akhmatova’s death, Nadezhda’s portrayal of their relationship seemed to shift.

Poet Anatoly Naiman later observed in his recollections, that Nadezhda appeared to imply an intellectual superiority over both Akhmatova and Osip. Whether intentional or not, this final portrayal reinforced the idea that Nadezhda saw herself as fundamentally different, more independent, more resilient, and, perhaps, more self-aware.

== Later life ==
Through the terrible years, Nadezhda Mandelstam gained her college degree and taught English in various provincial towns. After the death of Joseph Stalin on 5 March 1953, when government's repression eased, she returned to her studies and completed her dissertation in linguistics (1956).

She was not allowed to return to Moscow until 1964, following the first phase of Osip Mandelstam's rehabilitation (under Nikita Khrushchev). She had spent 20 years in a kind of internal exile until the "thaws" of the late 1950s. Nadezhda began writing her memoir, which was published in English as Hope Against Hope in 1970, in part as a way of restoring her husband's memory and integrating her own struggles. It first circulated in a samizdat version in the Soviet Union in the 1960s.

In his memoirs of meeting Nadezhda Mandelstam in 1975, retired University of Kent lecturer Edward Greenwood describes her as paranoid and worried, in fear of KGB surveillance. She lived in a small ground-floor apartment in Moscow and had not travelled abroad for more than 15 years. She had no communication with abroad either, as she told Greenwood that no mail was allowed to reach her from either inside Russia or outside it. In 1976, Mandelstam gave her archives to Princeton University in the United States.

In 1979, her heart condition deteriorated, and she took to her bed in early December 1980. Nadezhda Mandelstam died on 29 December 1980 in Moscow. The funeral was arranged in the Russian Orthodox rite, with the lying in state taking place on 1 January 1981, in the church of Our Lady of the Sign. She was buried on 2 January 1981, at the Kuntsevo Cemetery.

== Works ==
Nadezhda wrote two memoirs about her life with Osip Mandelstam and the repressive Stalinist regime: Hope Against Hope (1970) and Hope Abandoned (1974), both first published in the West in English, translated by Max Hayward.

In her memoirs, Hope Against Hope (1970, 1977) and Hope Abandoned (1974, 1981), first published in the West, she made an epic analysis of her husband's life and times. She elevated her husband as the figure of an artistic martyr under Stalin's repressive regime. She criticized the moral and cultural degradation of the Soviet Union of the 1920s and later. The titles of her memoirs use word play as nadezhda means "hope" in Russian.

The third book remained unfinished. It contains Anna Akhmatova's memoirs, which for 40 years were considered lost. They were published in German translation by Suhrkamp Verlag in 2011.

Of these books the critic Clive James wrote, "Hope Against Hope puts her at the centre of the liberal resistance under the Soviet Union. A masterpiece of prose as well as a model of biographical narrative and social analysis it is mainly the story of the terrible last years of persecution and torment before the poet [her husband Osip] was murdered. The sequel, Hope Abandoned, is about the author's personal fate, and is in some ways even more terrible, because, as the title implies, it is more about horror as a way of life than as an interruption to normal expectancy. [The two books] were key chapters in the new bible that the twentieth century had written for us."

== Legacy ==
- On May 23, 1985, South African writer Alan Paton delivered the Alfred and Winifred Hoernlé Memorial Lecture sponsored by the South African Institute of Race Relations. He told the story of Hope Against Hope and Hope Abandoned, then added: "In South Africa we are still writing the first book. We trust that we shall never have to write the second."
- On May 25, 2010, a monument to both Osip and Nadezhda was unveiled in St. Petersburg, in the courtyard of the Twelve Collegia building at St. Petersburg State University.
- In 2011, a street in Amsterdam was named in memory of Nadezhda Mandelstam.
- On September 25, 2015, a monument to Osip and Nadezhda Mandelstam was unveiled on Nadezhda Mandelstam Street in Amsterdam. The sculpture, created by Hanneke de Munck, granddaughter of Norwegian expressionist Edvard Munch, and Sietse Becker, honors their "enduring influence on literature and history."
