= Cherdyn, Perm Krai =

Town in Perm Krai, Russia

Cherdyn Чердынь Чердін (Komi)
- Town
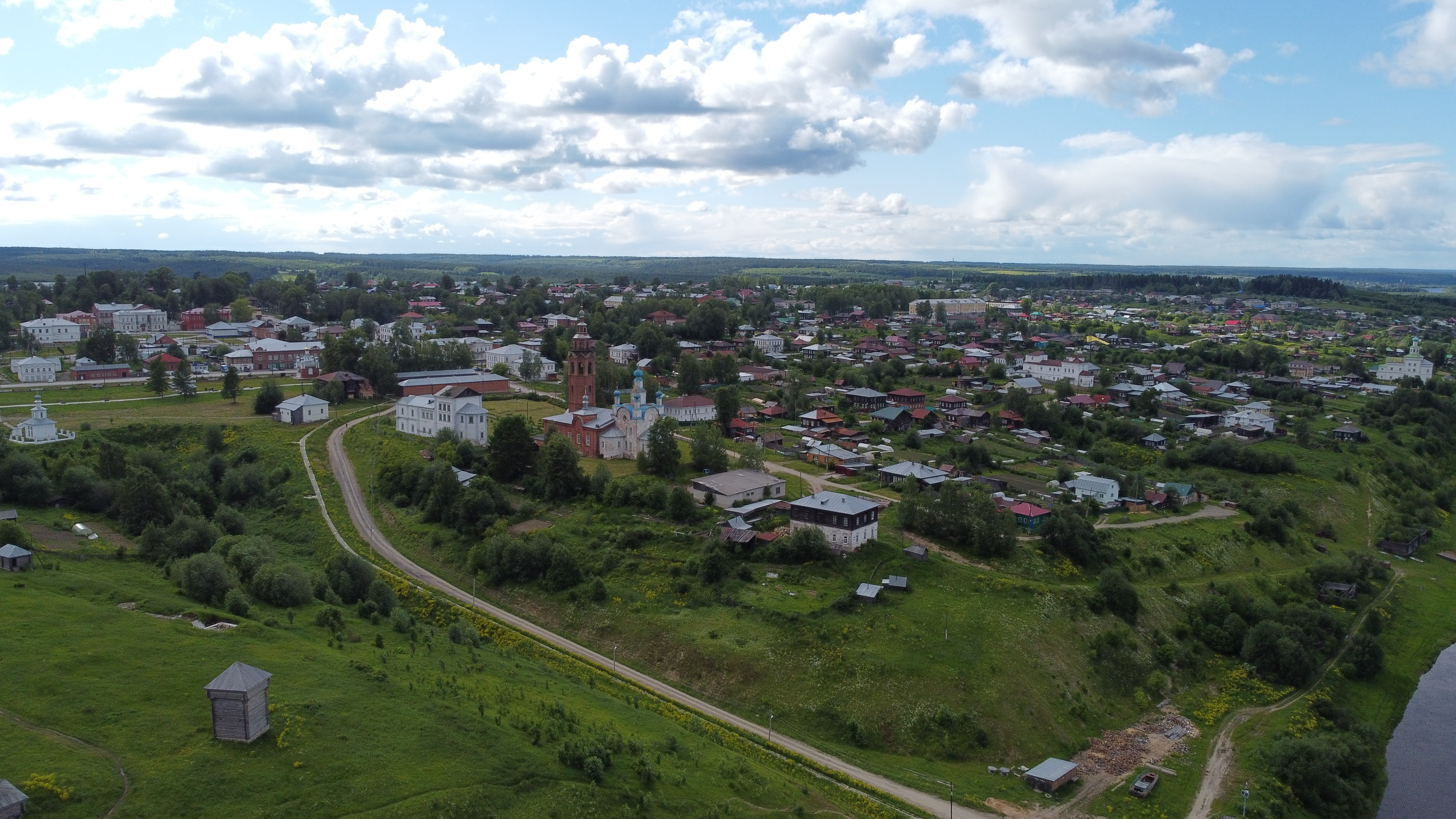

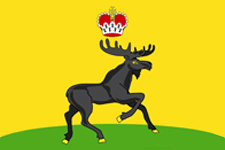
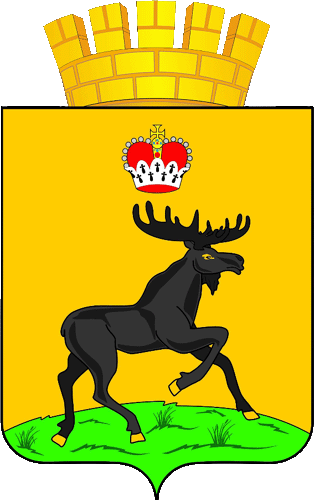
- Flag Coat of arms
- Interactive map of Cherdyn
- Location of Cherdyn Cherdyn (Perm Krai)
- Coordinates: 60°25′N 56°30′E
- Country: Russia
- Federal subject: Perm Krai
- Administrative district: Cherdynsky District
- Elevation: 160 m (520 ft)

Population (2010 Census)
  - Total: 4,920
  - Estimate (2023): 4,502 (−8.5%)

Administrative status
  - Capital of: Cherdynsky District

Municipal status
  - Municipal district: Cherdynsky Municipal District
  - Urban settlement: Cherdynskoye Urban Settlement
  - Capital of: Cherdynsky Municipal District, Cherdynskoye Urban Settlement
- Time zone: UTC+5 (MSK+2)
- Postal codes: 618601, 618603
- OKTMO ID: 57656101001

Cherdyn (Russian: Че́рдынь; Komi: Чердін) is a town and the administrative center of Cherdynsky District in Perm Krai, Russia, located on the Kolva River. Population: 4,920 (2010 census); 5,756 (2002 census); 6,535 (1989 Soviet census).

== History ==
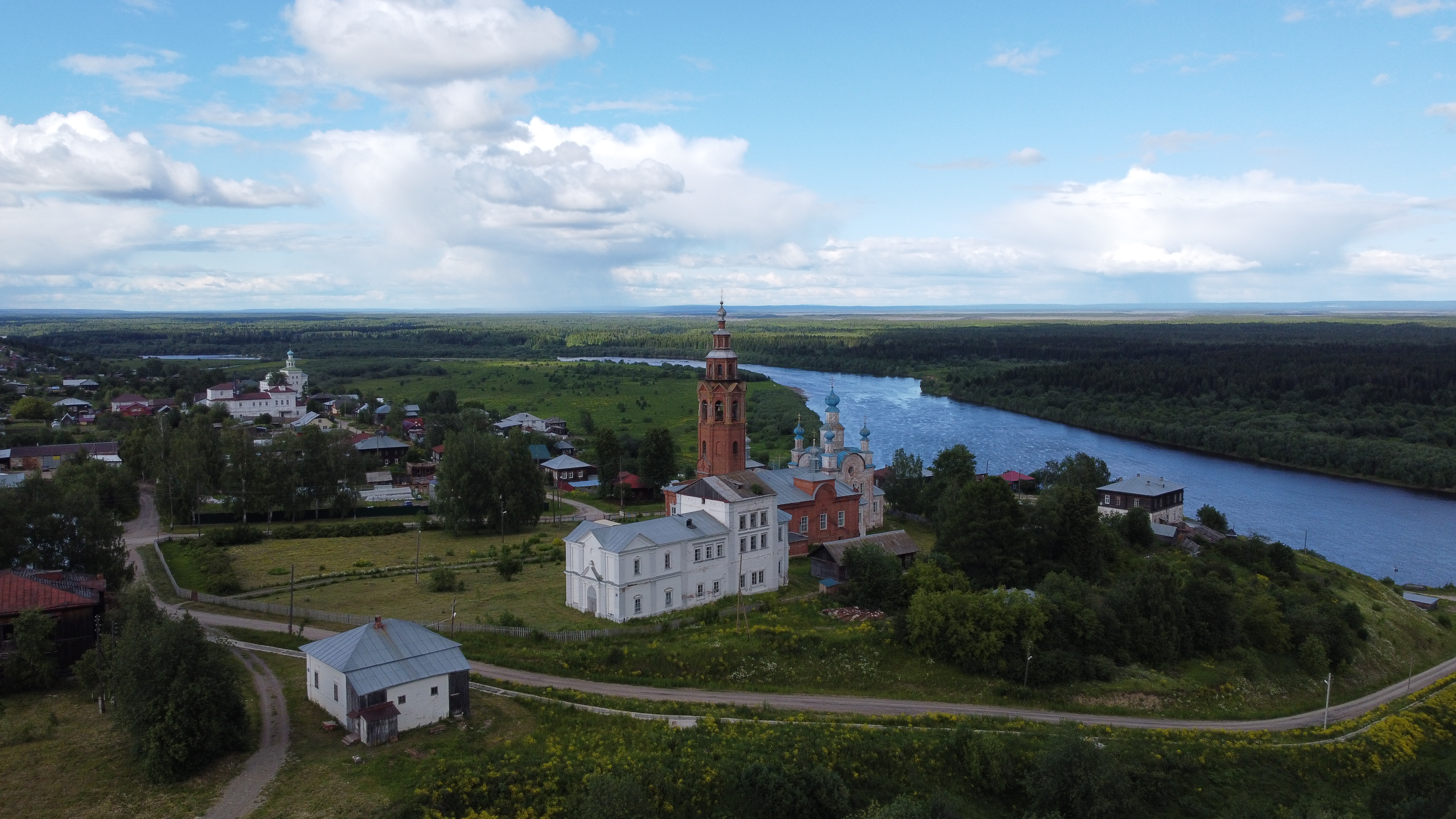
Historical center of Cherdyn and Kolva river

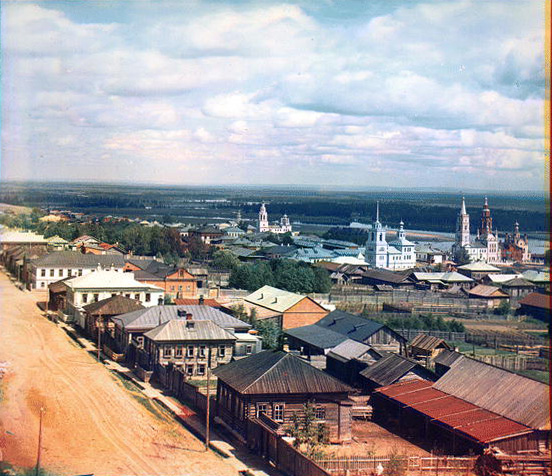
View of Cherdyn in 1912

Local authorities advertise Cherdyn to tourists as the capital of the ancient Principality of Great Perm. This information is based on an 1835 study by the Swedish historian A. M. Strinnholm, as well as the 1815 study by the Russian historian Nikolay Karamzin. Strinnholm mentioned that the last trip of Scandinavian Vikings to Bjarmia (a.k.a. Great Perm) happened in 1222. Four well-equipped ships of Haakon IV of Norway burned Bjarmian towns to the ground.

After that, the fur trade between the Great Perm and Western Europe was possible only via the Novgorod Republic, which controlled the Russian North. After the Russian principalities began to be united by the grand princes of Moscow, the princes of Perm, who already had Russian names, became their vassals, in addition to answering to Novgorod. Great Perm–Cherdyn supplied a great deal of silver paid as tribute of Moscow, which in turn was paid to the Golden Horde. Tensions between Moscow and Novgorod led to a war in 1471, after which Novgorod was annexed by Moscow. The following year, Cherdyn, Pokcha, and all other towns of Great Perm were annexed into the Russian state. The main fort of the Muscovites was built in Pokcha, located 7 kilometers (4.3 mi) to the north of Cherdyn. It was burned by indigenous tribes in the beginning of the 16th century.

Cherdyn, as well as all of Perm, was still governed by the dynasty of local princes of Great Perm until 1505. After that, the grand prince sent a governor from Moscow, and he chose Cherdyn as his residence. In 1535, Cherdyn was granted town rights. It was the starting point of an early river route to Siberia. Following the establishment of the Babinov Road—a more traveled overland route—the town quickly lost its significance.

Many Polish insurgents of the January Uprising were exiled in Cherdyn in the 1860s.

== Administrative and municipal status ==
Within the framework of administrative divisions, Cherdyn serves as the administrative center of Cherdynsky District, to which it is directly subordinated. As a municipal division, the town of Cherdyn is incorporated within Cherdynsky Municipal District as Cherdynskoye Urban Settlement.

== Geography ==
=== Climate ===
Cherdyn has a subarctic climate (Köppen climate classification Dfc), with very cold winters and warm summers. Precipitation is moderate and is somewhat higher in summer and fall than at other times of the year.

Climate data for Cherdyn
Month	Jan	Feb	Mar	Apr	May	Jun	Jul	Aug	Sep	Oct	Nov	Dec	Year
Daily mean °C (°F)	−17.3 (0.9)	−14.2 (6.4)	−6.4 (20.5)	1.0 (33.8)	8.0 (46.4)	14.3 (57.7)	17.4 (63.3)	13.7 (56.7)	7.7 (45.9)	−0.3 (31.5)	−7.4 (18.7)	−13.3 (8.1)	0.3 (32.5)
Average precipitation mm (inches)	49.7 (1.96)	33.8 (1.33)	35.8 (1.41)	44.7 (1.76)	52.8 (2.08)	66.5 (2.62)	86.2 (3.39)	72.9 (2.87)	69.3 (2.73)	72.5 (2.85)	73.0 (2.87)	59.3 (2.33)	716.5 (28.2)
Average precipitation days (≥ 1.0mm)	14.3	9.5	9.1	9.6	9.2	9.8	11.0	11.0	12.1	14.5	15.3	15.3	140.7
Mean monthly sunshine hours	38	74	144	195	271	294	289	225	120	51	36	14	1,751
Source: NOAA (1961-1990)

== Notable people ==
In 1934, during the times of Stalin, Cherdyn was the place to which poet Osip Mandelstam was sentenced to internal exile with his wife Nadezhda.
