= Cherdynsky District =

Cherdynsky District Чердынский район (Russian)
- District
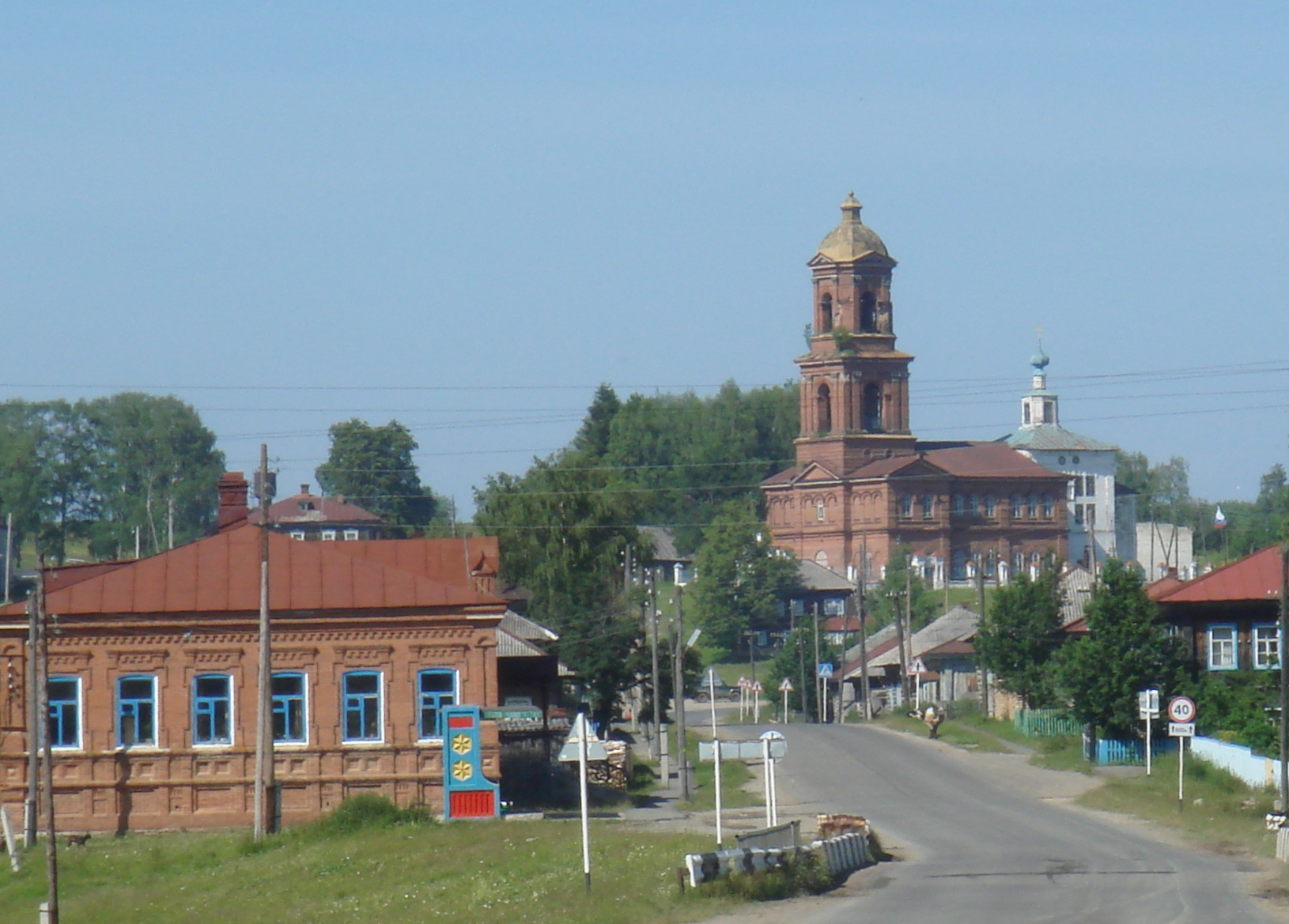
- The selo of Vilgort in Cherdynsky District

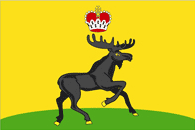
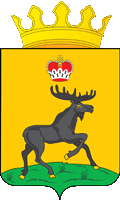
- Flag Coat of arms
- Location of Cherdynsky District in Perm Krai
- Coordinates: 60.830°N 56.483°E
- Country: Russia
- Federal subject: Perm Krai
- Established: 1924
- Administrative center: Cherdyn

Area
  - Total: 20,872 km^{2} (8,059 sq mi)

Population (2010 Census)
  - Total: 24,568
  - Density: 1.1771/km^{2} (3.0486/sq mi)
  - Urban: 42.5%
  - Rural: 57.5%

Administrative structure
  - Inhabited localities: 1 cities/towns, 1 urban-type settlements, 97 rural localities

Municipal structure
  - Municipally incorporated as: Cherdynsky Municipal District
  - Municipal divisions: 0 urban settlements, 4 rural settlements
- Website: http://cherdynamr.ru/

Cherdynsky District (Russian: Че́рдынский райо́н) is an administrative district (raion) of Perm Krai, Russia; one of the thirty-three in the krai. Municipally, it is incorporated as Cherdynsky Municipal District. It is located in the north and northeast of the krai and borders with the Komi Republic in the north, Krasnovishersky District in the east, Solikamsky District in the south, Kosinsky District in the southwest, and with Gaynsky District in the west. The area of the district is 20,872 square kilometers (8,059 sq mi). Its administrative center is the town of Cherdyn. Population: 24,568 (2010 census); 35,152 (2002 census); 40,688 (1989 Soviet census). The population of Cherdyn accounts for 20.0% of the district's total population.

== Geography ==
About 94% of the district's territory is covered by forests, which are mostly coniferous. Large portions of the territory are also covered by swamps and lakes. Major rivers flowing through the district include the Kama, the Kolva, and their tributaries.

== History ==
The district was established in 1924.

== Demographics ==
Russians, at 90.5%, are the predominant ethnicity in the district. Other ethnicities of note include Tatars and Ukrainians, at 1.5% each.

== Economy ==
The economy of the district is based on forestry and timber industry. There is also food industry.

== See also ==
- Vilisova

== Sources ==
- Законодательное собрание Пермской области. Закон №416-67 от 28 февраля 1996 г. «Об административно-территориальном устройстве Пермского края», в ред. Закона №504-ПК от 9 июля 2015 г. «О внесении изменений в Закон Пермской области "Об административно-территориальном устройстве Пермского края"». Вступил в силу с момента опубликования. Опубликован: "Звезда", №38, 12 марта 1996 г. (Legislative Assembly of Perm Oblast. Law #416-67 of February 28, 1996 On the Administrative-Territorial Structure of Perm Krai, as amended by the Law #504-PK of July 9, 2015 On Amending the Law of Perm Oblast "On the Administrative-Territorial Structure of Perm Krai". Effective as of the moment of publication.).
- Законодательное собрание Пермской области. Закон №1735-355 от 10 ноября 2004 г. «Об утверждении границ и о наделении статусом муниципальных образований Чердынского района Пермского края», в ред. Закона №175-ПК от 7 марта 2013 г. «О внесении изменений в отдельные Законы Пермской области, Коми-Пермяцкого автономного округа об утверждении границ и о наделении статусом муниципальных образований Пермского края». Вступил в силу через десять дней со дня официального опубликования. Опубликован: "Бюллетень Законодательного Собрания и администрации Пермской области", №12, I часть, 9 декабря 2004 г. (Legislative Assembly of Perm Oblast. Law #1735-355 of November 10, 2004 On Establishing the Borders and on Granting the Status to the Municipal Formations of Cherdynsky District of Perm Krai, as amended by the Law #175-PK of March 7, 2013 On Amending Various Laws of Perm Oblast, Komi-Permyak Autonomous Okrug on Establishing the Borders and on Granting the Status to the Municipal Formations of Perm Krai. Effective as of the day which is ten days following the day of the official publication.).
