= Abu Sayeed Ayyub =

Indian philosopher, teacher, literary critic and writer

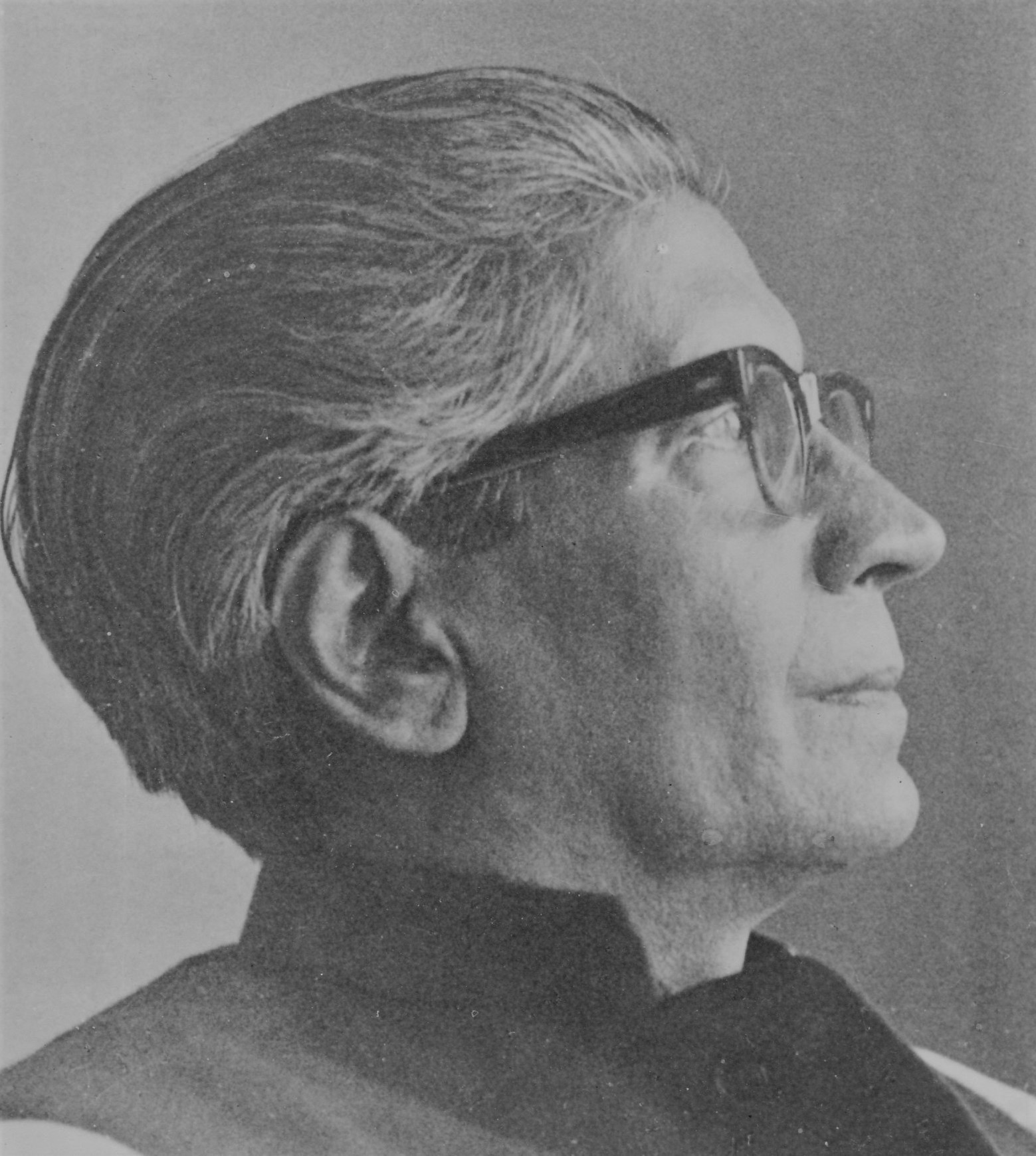
- Born: 14 April 1906; Kolkata, India
- Died: 21 December 1982 (aged 76); Kolkata
- Education: St. Xavier's Collegiate School; Presidency College
- Occupations: Philosopher, literary critic, writer, professor
- Spouse: Gauri Ayyub
- Children: 1
- Writing career
- Language: Bengali, English, Urdu
- Subjects: Philosophy, Physics
- Notable works: Adhunikata O Rabindranath (Modernism and Tagore), Panthojaner Sokha (The Wayfarer's Friend), Pather Shesh Kothay (Where does the journey end)
- Notable awards: Sahitya Akademi Award, Rabindra Puraskar, Ananda Puraskar, Desikottama, Friends of Liberation War Honour (Bangladesh).

Abu Sayeed Ayyub (Bengali language: আবু সয়ীদ আইয়ুব; 1906–1982) was an Indian philosopher, teacher, literary critic and writer in both Bengali and English. Though born into an Urdu-speaking Muslim family in Kolkata, he was so captivated in his early teenage by the poems of Rabindranath Tagore that he taught himself Bengali so as to appreciate Tagore better. Later, when he started to write, it was mostly in his adopted language, Bengali. During the initial part of his writing career, Ayyub wrote on aesthetics, religion and socialism. However, it was his philosophical and scientific analysis of creative literature—in particular the poetry and the drama of Tagore—that finally brought him wide recognition as "one of the most serious and original Tagore scholars". Ayyub is also credited with "co-editing the first anthology of modern Bengali poetry". He taught philosophy at the University of Calcutta, the Visva-Bharati University, and the University of Melbourne, and edited the literary and philosophical journal Quest.

== Early life ==
Ayyub was born into a traditional, cultured Muslim family and spent most of his early life in his ancestral home in Central Calcutta. He was the fifth and youngest child of Ameena Khatun and Abul Mukarem Abbad, who served as the personal clerk to the then Viceroy of India, Lord Curzon (George Curzon).

== Education ==
Ayyub first went to the English-medium St. Anthony's School and then completing the Intermediate Science course at the St. Xavier's College, Kolkata. When 13, he read the Urdu translations of Tagore's Gitanjali in the Urdu literary magazine Kah-Kushan. This moved him to learn Bengali and read the original works of Tagore; over the next few years, he taught himself the language with the help of popular Bengali novels. Two other major influences during his early teenage years were his sister-in-law, who introduced him to Charles Dickens, George Elliott and Charlotte Brontë, and his teacher of Urdu and Persian at St. Anthony's, who encouraged him to read the classical Urdu and Persian poetry of Ghalib, Mir Taqi Mir, Khwaja Mir Dard, Omar Khayyam and Hafez.

He joined Presidency College, Calcutta (now Presidency University, Kolkata) for his B.Sc. degree with Physics as the honours (major) subject. Though he was already planning to study philosophy in future, he continued on to his M.Sc., mainly to satisfy his fascination with Einstein's General Relativity theory. He was fortunate to get an opportunity to study Arthur Eddington’s "Mathematical Theory of Relativity" with the famous mathematician, Prasanta Chandra Mahalanobis. However, ill health prevented Ayyub from finishing his M.Sc. course and he went on to complete his M.A. in philosophy. While studying for his M.A., Ayyub accepted a research scholarship and worked on the "Content of Error in Perception and Thought". His research supervisor, the famous Indian philosopher (and later the second President of independent India), Sarvapalli Radhakrishnan, did not however appreciate his ‘logic chopping and hair splitting analysis’! Ayyub soon discovered the impracticality of carrying out research on modern Western Philosophy in India of the 1930s, due to a lack of access to modern journals as well as the paucity of like-minded thinkers. These circumstances eventually nudged him towards his second love: literature.

== Writer and editor ==
Ayyub announced his arrival into the literary world of Bengal with four essays on the interplay of philosophy, physics, aesthetics and literature that were published between 1934 and 1936 in the premier Bengali literary journal of the time, Porichoy, edited by Sudhindranath Dutta. His early training in science not only influenced his analytical style of writing but had left him with a lifelong interest in the latest scientific developments. In 1940, Ayyub co-edited (with Hirendranath Mukherjee) the first definitive anthology of modern Bengali poetry (Adhunik Bangla Kabita) with a comprehensive introduction, an abridged version of which was also translated into English. Much later (in 1957), he produced a similar anthology of modern Bengali romantic poetry (Pa(n)chish Bochhor-er Prem-er Kabita).

Ayyub's study of the religious philosophy and world view of Tagore was based on an analysis of his poetry and drama. Most of these essays appeared in the Bengali literary magazine, Desh during the mid-1960s and were later collected and published as three books: Adhunikata O Rabindranath (Modernism and Tagore) in 1968, Panthojaner Sokha (The Wayfarer's Friend) in 1973, and Pather Shesh Kothay (Where does the journey end) in 1977. These studies were hailed by critics as a new way of understanding Tagore. Ayyub received the highest honours at both the State level (Rabindra Memorial Award) as well as National level (Sahitya Akademi Award) for his work on Tagore. During the 70s, he also published two collections of Bengali translations of his favourite Urdu poets, Ghalib and Mir Taqi Mir.

Between 1958 and 1968, Ayyub co-edited (with Amlan Datta) the literary and philosophical journal, Quest, published from Bombay (now Mumbai). During this period, Quest published the work of some of India's most prominent intellectuals of the time, including: Nirad C. Chaudhuri, Rajni Kothari, Sibnarayan Ray, P. Lal, Dom Moraes, Khushwant Singh, and Gieve Patel. Some of Ayyub's own work first appeared in its pages. However, Quest was among several international journals which were financially supported by the Paris-based Congress for Cultural Freedom (CCF). During 1966–67, the New York Times revealed that the CCF was partly funded by the CIA. In view of the strongly leftist sentiments prevailing in Bengal at the time, this news placed Ayyub in an awkward situation. He declared his ignorance of this issue, categorically stating that "Quest's editorial policies have always been free of outside control" and cited several articles openly critical of the CIA that had appeared in the journal during his editorship. However, Ayyub left Quest soon afterwards, in 1968.

== Teaching and research ==
Due to his persistent ill health, Ayyub could not hold on to teaching appointments for any length of time. He first taught philosophy at Calcutta University from 1938 to 1940. In early 1941, Tagore asked Ayyub to consider joining Visva-Bharati University at Shantiniketan. Again, ill health prevented him from joining at the time. Tagore died later in the same year, and Ayyub finally joined Visva-Bharati as a Professor only in 1950. But, within a couple of years he needed to return to Calcutta for treatment. Ayyub's last major teaching appointment was in 1960, when he joined the newly established Department of Indian Studies at the University of Melbourne (Australia) as the first head of the department. Ayyub was credited with organizing the first systematic set of courses in Indian philosophy and literature in Australasia. But the fickle Melbourne climate did not suit him and he had to be hospitalized before returning prematurely in less than two years.

Through the better part of his working life, Ayyub continued his studies on various aspects of Philosophy. In 1959, he presided over the Ethics Section of the Indian Philosophy Congress. He was invited to contribute to the iconic History of Philosophy Eastern and Western edited by Sarvapalli Radhakrishnan in 1953 and to the prestigious Centenary Volume on Rabindranath Tagore published in 1961 by the Sahitya Akademi. In 1968, he delivered the first ‘Hirendranath Datta Memorial Lecture’ at Jadavpur University on the philosophy of poetry, which was published later as a book (Poetry and Truth). In 1969, he was awarded a 3-year fellowship at the Indian Institute of Advanced Study at Shimla, where he worked on the religious and secular thoughts of Tagore, Mahatma Gandhi and Abul Kalam Azad.

== Socio-political views ==
Ayyub was a vocal supporter of freedom of thought and expression. During the 1950s, he was particularly attracted to the Radical Humanist movement, which attempted to chart out a third course between liberalism and communism, and was led by M. N. Roy, of whom he was a personal friend. In the early 70s, Ayyub was particularly perturbed by the suppression of linguistic freedom in the neighboring East Pakistan (later, Bangladesh), with many of whose poets and writers he shared close ties. His contribution to the Bangladesh Liberation War was later recognized by their Government through the (posthumous) award of the Friends of Liberation War Honour in 2013 for "...extending support to the poets, writers and political activists from Bangladesh" and for his "...relentless efforts to win the support of the Indian intellectuals for the cause of Bangladesh".

== Personal life ==
Ayyub's life was a story of a constant struggle to pursue his creative ambitions against the debilitating effects of several chronic diseases, including tuberculosis in his early life. After finishing his education he moved into an apartment in Park Circus in South Kolkata, where he spent the rest of his life. Here, he lived next to the family of his elder brother, A. M. O. Ghani, a physician as well as a Communist leader and long-time member of the State Legislative Assembly. In 1956, Ayyub married his erstwhile student, Gauri Datta, who hailed from a Hindu family. Inter-religious alliances were unusual at the time, and Gauri's father (the well known Gandhian philosopher, Dhirendra Mohan Datta) disapproved of the marriage and severed all relations with her. During the 60s and 70s, their home at 5 Pearl Road became known as a meeting place for many of Kolkata's intellectual and literary cognoscenti. Ayyub's academic as well as personal interactions with the poets and writers of his time are chronicled in a recently published collection of letters. Arguably, Ayyub's best literary output appeared during the last decade and a half of his life, during which period he was stricken by the neurodegenerative Parkinson's disease. Much of his writing during this time was dictated to family members and friends. His continued creativity during these years can be mainly attributed to his wife Gauri's constant supervision and care (see the Wikipedia entry on Gauri Ayyub). Their only son, Pushan, was born in 1957 and pursued a career as a scientist.

== Awards and recognitions ==
1. (1970) Sahitya Akademi Award for his book Adhunikata O Rabindranath
2. (1970) Rabindra Smriti Puraskar (Tagore Memorial Award).
3. (1976) Suresh Smriti Puraskar (Ananda Puraskar) of the Anandabazar Group
4. (1980) Desikottama Award of the Visva-Bharati University
5. (1983) Indian Council for Philosophical Research Award (posthumous)
6. (2013) Friends of Liberation War Honour awarded by the Bangladesh Government (posthumous)

== Bibliography ==
=== Books in Bengali ===
1. (1970) Adhunikata O Rabindranath (আধুনিকতা ও রবীন্দ্রনাথ) Kolkata: Dey's Publishing,. ISBN 81-7079-159-6. English translation (by Amitava Ray): Modernism and Tagore; 1995: New Delhi: Sahitya Akademi, ISBN 978-81-7201-851-1. Gujarati Translation (by Nagindas Parekh): Kavyama Aadhunikta, 1977. Tamil translation (by S. Krishnamurthy): Naveena Thanmaiyum Ravindirum, 2013.
2. (1973) Panthojaner Sokha (পান্থজনের সখা: The Wayfarer's Friend) Kolkata: Dey's Publishing: ISBN 81-7079-139-1. Gujarati Translation (by Nagindas Parekh): Panthjanana Sakha, 1977.
3. (1977) Pather Shesh Kothay (পথের শেষ কোথায়: Where Does The Journey End) Kolkata: Dey's Publishing,: ISBN 81-7079-210-X.
4. (1992) Byaktigata O Nairbyaktik (ব্যক্তিগত ও নৈর্ব্যক্তিক: The Personal and the Objective) Kolkata: Dey's Publishing; ISBN 81-2952-032-X

=== Books in English ===
1. (1970) Poetry and Truth; Kolkata: Jadavpur University.
2. (1980) Varieties of Experience; Kolkata: Riddhi. ASIN B0000EE3P7.
3. (1980) Tagore's Quest; Kolkata: Papyrus. ASIN B0006E4EP2.

=== Authored chapters in books ===
1. (1953) "Marxism" in S. Radhakrishnan (Editor): History of Philosophy Eastern and Western, Vol. 2 London: Allen & Unwin, Chapter XLVI, pp. 392–409.
2. (1953) "Whitehead's Theory of Evolutionism" in S. Radhakrishnan (Editor): History of Philosophy Eastern and Western, Vol. 2 London: Allen & Unwin, Chapter XLIV, pp. 365–376.
3. (1961) "The Aesthetic Philosophy of Tagore" in Rabindranath Tagore - A Centenary Volume; New Delhi: Sahitya Akademi, pp. 78–87.

=== Translations from Urdu ===
1. (1976) Ghaliber Ghazal thekey (গালিবের গজল থেকে: From the Ghazals of Ghalib) Kolkata, Dey's Publishing; ISBN 81-7079-033-6.
2. (1987) Mirer Ghazal thekey (মীরের গজল থেকে: From the Ghazals of Mir) Kolkata, Dey's Publishing; ISBN 81-295-0168-6.

=== Books edited ===
1. (1940) Adhunik Bangla Kabita (আধুনিক বাংলা কবিতা: An Anthology of Modern Bengali Poetry) Kolkata Kabita Bhavan; Kolkata: Dey's Publishing, 1999, edited jointly with Hirendranath Mukherjee. ISBN 81-7612-346-3.
2. (1957) Pa(n)chish Bochhor-er Prem-er Kabita (পঁচিশ বছরের প্রেমের কবিতা: Romantic Poetry in Bengali – The Last 25 Years) Kolkata: Signet Press; Kolkata: Dey's Publishing, 2009; ISBN 978-81-295-1313-7.
3. (1966) 10 years of Quest; Mumbai: Manaktalas, edited jointly with Amlan Datta. ASIN B000S9IZ5K
4. (1958-1968) Quest Vol. 17 to Vol. 59, edited jointly with Amlan Datta (Mumbai: Congress for Cultural Freedom).
