= Michael Josselson =

Michael Josselson (2 March 1908, Tartu, Governorate of Livonia – 7 January 1978, Geneva, Switzerland) was a CIA agent.

== Biography ==
Michael Josselson was born into a Jewish family in Estonia, where his father was a timber merchant. Strongly opposed to the Bolsheviks, his family moved to Germany after the Russian Revolution of 1917.

Josselson studied at the University of Berlin. After obtaining his diploma, he worked for the American department store Gimbel's, becoming the representative of the firm in Paris. When Hitler came to power, Josselson left Germany and emigrated to the United States in 1937 with his French wife. He continued to work in New York as the manager of Gimbel's European branches.

Michael Josselson joined the US Army during the Second World War. As he could speak four languages without the slightest accent, he was placed in the intelligence service. He was sent to Berlin with a team charged with conducting interrogations of German prisoners of war with the aim of distinguishing convinced Nazis from those who were not.

During the Cold War, Josselson was commissioned by the CIA to set up the Congress for Cultural Freedom in 1950. He recruited former communist intellectuals (André Malraux, Denis de Rougemont, Arthur Koestler, Franz Borkenau, André Gide, Raymond Aron, Bertrand Russell, Michael Polanyi, and others) to lead an ideological struggle in Europe against the influence of Marxist ideas, in the name of freedom of expression. Frances Stonor Saunders's 1999 book Who Paid the Piper? The CIA and the Cultural Cold War explains in detail the role of Michael Josselson in this operation.

In 1966, The New York Times revealed that the Congress for Cultural Freedom had received funding from the CIA. In 1967, the magazines Ramparts and Saturday Evening Post investigated the CIA's funding of a number of anti-communist cultural associations. These reports included a statement by a former CIA secret operations director admitting CIA funding and congressional operations. This revelation caused a great scandal and many intellectuals resigned from the Congress for Cultural Freedom.

Josselson devoted his last years to writing a biography of General Michael Andreas Barclay de Tolly, The Commander, which was published posthumously in 1980.

== Bibliography ==
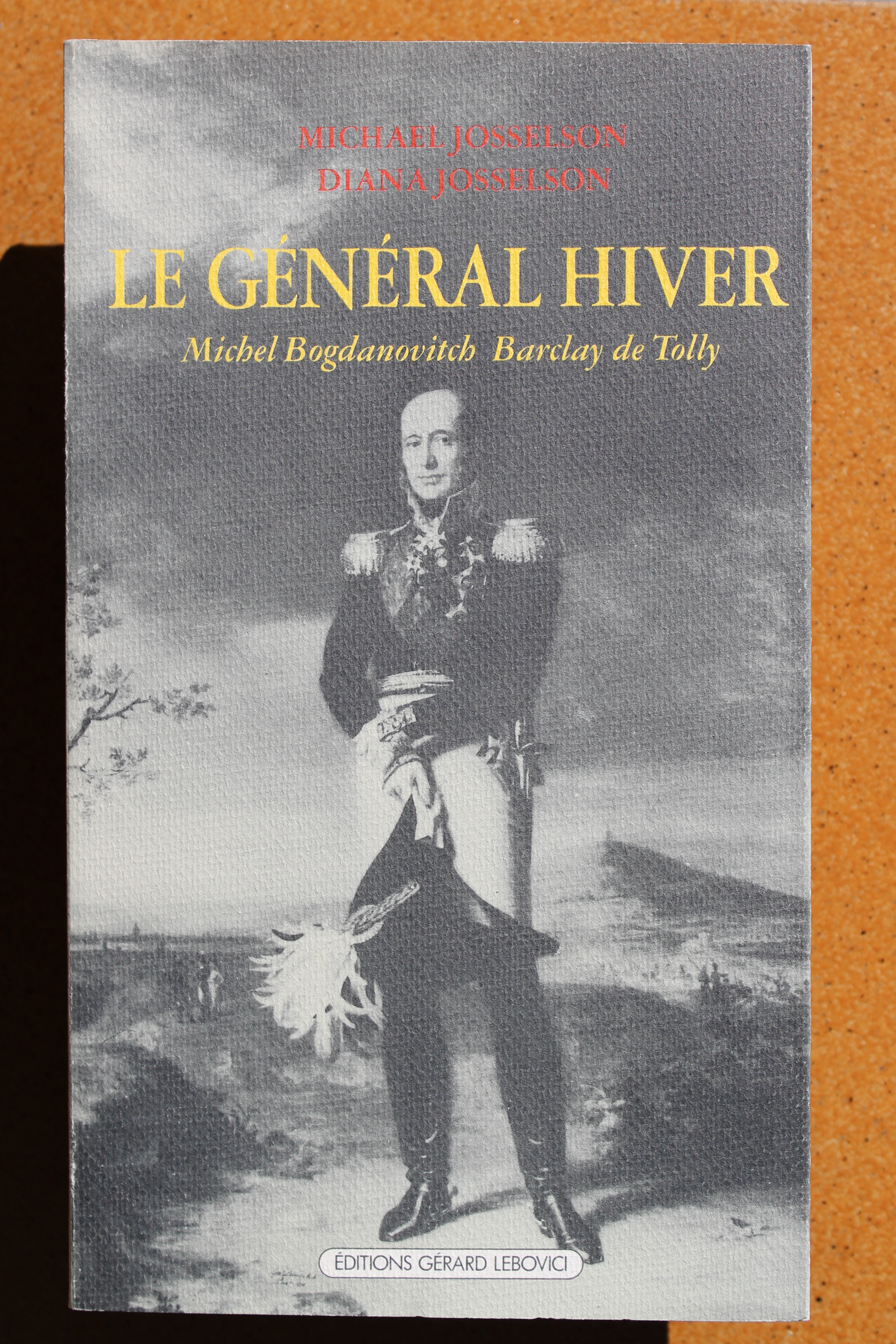
Le Général Hiver by Michael and Diana Josselson.

- Josselson, Michael; Josselson, Diana (1980). The Commander: A Life of Barclay de Tolly. Oxford: Oxford University Press. ISBN 0-19-215854-6.
- (in French) Michael et Diana Josselson, Le Général Hiver, Éditions Gérard Lebovici, Paris, 1986.
- Frances Stonor Saunders, Who Paid the Piper? The CIA and the Cultural Cold War , Granta, 1999.

== See also ==
- Congress for Cultural Freedom
- Cold War
- CIA
