= Al-Urwa (disambiguation) =

Al-Urwa or Al-Urwah (Arabic: العروة, The Bond) may refer to:

- Al-Urwah al-Wuthqa, 19th-century pan-Islamic journal.
- Al-Urwah al-Wuthqa (book), a Shi'i book of Islamic jurisprudence.
- Al-Urwa, a US propaganda magazine published in the 1950s.

== See also ==
- Urwa (disambiguation)
