= Urva =

Urva may refer to:

- Urva (genus), a genus of animals
- Urva, Azerbaijan, a village in Azerbaijan
- Urva, Pınarbaşı, a village in Turkey
- Urva (river), a river in Russia, ultimately draining into the Kama

== See also ==
- Urwa (disambiguation)
