= Urwa =

Urwa or Urwah is a feminine Muslim name of Arabic origin meaning "strong support."

== People ==
- Urwa ibn al-Ward (555–607), pre-Islamic poet
- Urwah ibn Mas'ud, semi-legendary chieftain of Taif
- Urwah ibn Zubayr (died 713), tabi'i Muslim historian
- Urwah al-Bariqi (c.610–681), companion of Muhammad
- Urwa Tul Wusqa, Pakistani actress and model

== Places ==
- Narimanovo Airport (ICAO code URWA), an airport in Astrakhan, Russia
- Urwa, India, a locality in Mangalore, India
- 'Urwah, Saudi Arabia, a village in Al Madinah Province, Saudi Arabia
- Abu `Urwah, a village in Makkah Province, Saudi Arabia.

== See also ==
- Al-Urwa (disambiguation)
