= Preuves (magazine) =

Defunct political magazine in France (1951–1975)

- Former editors: François Bondy
- Categories: Political magazine; Cultural magazine
- Frequency: Monthly
- Founder: Congress for Cultural Freedom
- Founded: 1951
- First issue: October 1951
- Final issue: 1975
- Company: Réalités Group (1969–1975)
- Country: France
- Based in: Paris
- Language: French
- ISSN: 0032-7980
- OCLC: 3825246

Preuves (French: Proof) was a French language monthly political and cultural magazine which existed between 1951 and 1975 and was headquartered in Paris, France. It was the first publication launched by the Congress for Cultural Freedom which later started other magazines, including Cuadernos, Encounter, Survey, Tempo Presente and Der Monat.

== History and profile ==
Preuves was established by the Congress for Cultural Freedom as a bulletin to publicize the political and intellectual views of the Congress members, and its first issue appeared in October 1951 with an editorial of French journalist Remy Roure. The establishment of the magazine was first discussed during the inaugural meeting of the Congress for Cultural Freedom in Berlin in 1950 and finalized at the executive committee meeting in Versailles. Russian-American composer and cultural figure Nicolas Nabokov played a significant role in the establishment of the magazine which was financed by the Central Intelligence Agency (CIA) like other periodicals of the Congress. Over time Preuves developed into a magazine instead of being a bulletin.

Preuves was published on a monthly basis. Swiss journalist François Bondy was the long-term director of the magazine which was redesigned in November 1951. From January 1952 the number of pages was expanded. That year Konstanty Jeleński joined the editorial board. Major contributors of Preuves included Julian Huxley, Mircea Eliade, André Malraux, Guido Piovene, Herbert Read, Allen Tate, Lionel Trilling, Robert Penn Warren, W. H. Auden, Thornton Wilder and Jayaprakash Narayan who also published articles in another publication of the Congress, Encounter. In fact, an article published in one of the Congress magazines was generally published in the others. For instance, it featured an article by Albert Hourani on Taha Hussein which was originally published in Hiwar's inaugural issue in 1962.

In the first year the number of subscribers was 1000. The topics which were frequently covered in the first two years were the European federalism and the need for a transatlantic debate. Preuves was subject to frequent criticisms as being an American magazine and an anti-Communist publication. The magazine became part of the Réalités Group, a subsidiary of the Hachette Group, in 1969 which led to the redesign of the editorial board. François Bondy left the magazine in 1972 when it turned to be a foreign policy publication losing its original Atlanticist, anti-neutralist and pro-American mission. The magazine folded in 1975.
