= Melvin J. Lasky =

American journalist

Melvin Jonah Lasky
- Born: January 15, 1920; New York, NY, USA
- Died: May 19, 2004 (aged 84); Berlin, Germany
- Education: University of Michigan
- Occupations: Editor, journalist, author
- Spouse(s): Brigitte (Newiger) Lasky; Helga Hegewisch
- Children: Vivienne Lasky; Oliver Lasky
- Family: Floria Lasky (sister); David R. Altman (brother-in-law)

Melvin Jonah Lasky (15 January 1920 – 19 May 2004) was an American journalist, intellectual, and member of the anti-Communist left. He founded the German journal Der Monat in 1948 and, from 1958 to 1991, edited Encounter, one of many journals revealed to have been secretly funded by the CIA through the Congress for Cultural Freedom (CCF).

From 1950 to 1963, the CIA covertly supported the CCF and a number of its publications, including Encounter. While Lasky admitted he knew of the CIA's role as a funding source before it was made public in 1966, allegations that he was a CIA agent have not been substantiated by evidence. In 1947, Lasky wrote an influential document that made the case for a cultural Cold War intended to win over European intellectuals.

== Early life and World War II ==
Lasky was born in The Bronx of New York City to a Jewish family and schooled at City College of New York, where he wrote for the student newspaper, The Campus. He continued his education at University of Michigan and Columbia University. He briefly considered himself a Trotskyist but at 22 moved away from communism entirely because of disgust with Joseph Stalin. He began working for the New Leader in New York and was editor from 1942 to 1943. Lasky wrote an editorial during this time criticizing the Allies for failing to address The Holocaust directly in their World War II efforts.

He was the older brother of Floria Lasky, an influential entertainment lawyer, and Joyce Lasky Reed, the President and founder of the Fabergé Arts Foundation and former Director of European Affairs at the American Enterprise Institute.

He served in World War II as a combat historian for the 7th Army. Lasky remained in Germany after the war, making his home in Berlin, where he worked for American military governor Lucius D. Clay. During this time, Lasky was an outspoken critic of the United States' earlier reluctance to intervene to stop the genocide of European Jews.

== Germany and Der Monat ==
After Lasky left the Army, he became a German correspondent for the New Leader and for the Partisan Review. In 1947, Lasky sent a message to General Lucius D. Clay which became known as "The Melvin Lasky Proposal". In this document, Lasky argued for a more aggressive campaign of cultural and psychological operations to combat the Soviet Union in the Cold War. It reads:

The time-honored U.S. formula of 'shed light and the people will find their own way' exaggerated the possibilities in Germany (and in Europe) for an easy conversion . . . It would be foolish to expect to wean a primitive savage away from his conviction in mysterious jungle-herbs simply by the dissemination of modern scientific and medical information . . . We have not succeeded in combatting the variety of factors—political, psychological, cultural—which work against U.S. foreign policy, and in particular against the success of the Marshall Plan in Europe.

Soon after, Lasky received Marshall Plan funding to create the German-language journal Der Monat ("The Month"), airlifted into Berlin during the 1948 Soviet blockade. Its purpose was to support U.S. foreign policy and win over German intellectuals views that were socially progressive but anti-communist. Der Monat continued as a prominent highbrow Germanophone journal, incorporating essays and articles from many Western European and North America intellectuals as well as dissidents from the Eastern Bloc. Contributors included Theodor Adorno, Hannah Arendt, Franz Borkenau, Thomas Mann, Arthur Koestler, Raymond Aron, Ignazio Silone, Heinrich Böll, Hans Sahl, Max Frisch, T. S. Eliot, Saul Bellow, Milovan Djilas, Richard Löwenthal, Peter de Mendelssohn, Hilde Spiel, and Hermann Kesten. The journal also received funding from the Ford Foundation and the CIA. According to CIA official Ray S. Cline the journal "would not have been able to survive financially without CIA funds".

Lasky helped to found the Congress for Cultural Freedom (CCF) at a 1950 conference he organized in West Berlin. Frank Wisner, of the CIA's Office of Policy Coordination, criticized Lasky for making American sponsorship of the conference too obvious. Although temporarily expelled from the CCF by Wisner, Lasky was included again in 1953 as a member of the "Tri-Magazine Editorial Committee", which established policies and topics for Der Monat, Preuves, and Encounter. As part of this committee, Lasky argued that these magazines must express some dissent against the American government or risk being exposed as propaganda. Furthermore, Lasky contributed to sustaining West Berlin's role as a symbol of transatlantic solidarity.

Der Monat was sold to Die Zeit and temporarily ceased publication in 1971. From 1978 until 1987, Der Monat (now titled Der Monat (Neue Folge) or simply Der Monat (N. F.)) re-surfaced as a Die Zeit quarterly without Lasky's involvement as editor-in-chief, but Lasky remained publisher along with his German wife Helga Hegewisch, while the journal's new editor-in-chief was SPD politician and later German Minister of Culture Michael Naumann. A new economy and marketing publication called Der Monat appearing in Germany since 1997 has nothing to do with the former journal's socio-political concept and design.

== Encounter ==
In the English-speaking world, Lasky was best known for his role as Editor-in-Chief of Encounter. He succeeded Irving Kristol, the original editor and founder, in 1958 and helped turn the young magazine into one of the most highly regarded periodicals in Europe. Lasky steered Encounter to represent the point of view of the anti-Communist, anti-Totalitarian Left, and reportedly favored the journal's political side over its more purely cultural endeavors. He remained at Encounter until the magazine folded in 1991.

Both Encounter and Der Monat had long received funding from the CIA-sponsored Congress for Cultural Freedom (CCF). Lasky denied knowledge of CIA funding in a 1966 letter (written jointly with Irving Kristol and Stephen Spender) to The New York Times. However, Lasky confessed privately to Frank Kermode (recruited as editor in 1965) that he had known about CIA funding for some years. In 1967, Ramparts and other publications revealed the CIA's relationship to the CCF and its publications, embarrassing many who were involved.

== Other activities and private life ==
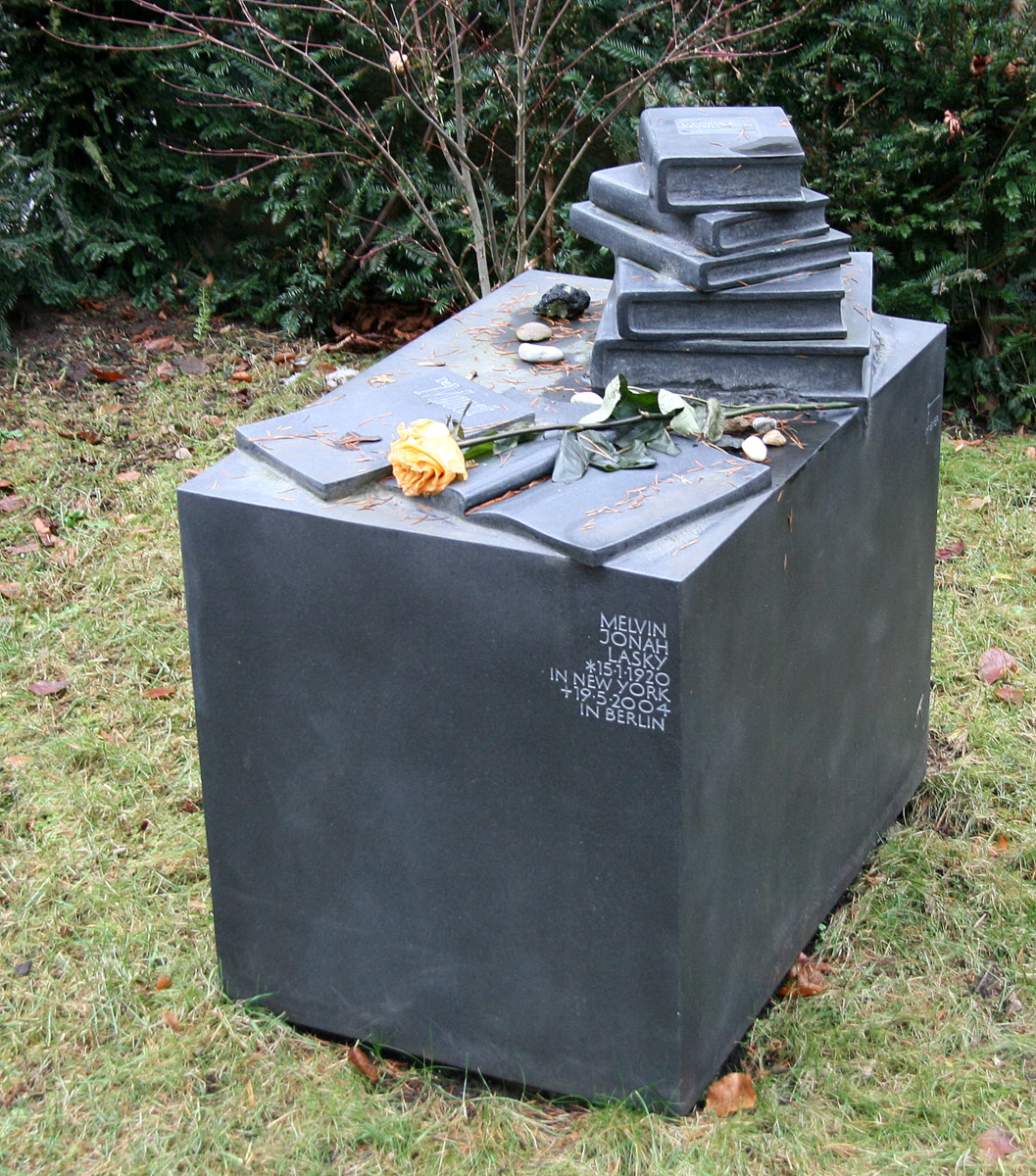
Lasky's grave in Berlin

Lasky was the author of many books including Utopia and Revolution, Voices in the Revolution, On the Barricades and Off, and The Language of Journalism. He was married twice, to Brigitte Lasky (née Newiger) with whom he had two children, Vivienne Lasky and Oliver Lasky, and to German novelist Helga Hegewisch.

Lasky died in May 2004 of a heart ailment. A portion of Lasky's unpublished memoirs appears in News from the Republic of Letters, as well as in The Berlin Journal, Spring, 2007.

== Lasky Center for Transatlantic Studies ==
In October 2010, LMU Munich opened the Lasky Center for Transatlantic Studies, a research center associated with the university's American Studies department. The Lasky Center is home to Lasky's personal library and papers. Its director is Christof Mauch.

== Published works ==
- 1962. ‘Africa for beginners, a traveller’s notebook’ library of Congress 62-15206
- 1988. The Use and Abuse of Sovietology. Transaction Publishers.
- 1988. On the Barricades, and Off. Transaction Publishers.
- 2000. The Language of Journalism: Newspaper Culture. Transaction Publishers.
- 2004. Utopia and Revolution: On the Origins of a Metaphor. Transaction Publishers.
- 2005. European Notebooks: New Societies and Old Politics, 1954-1985. Transaction Publishers.
- 2006. Voices in a Revolution: The Collapse of East German Communism. Transaction Publishers.
- 2007. Media Warfare: The Americanization of Language. Transaction Publishers.
- 2014. Profanity, Obscenity and the Media, Volume Two. Transaction Publishers.

== See also ==
- Der Monat (German Wikipedia)
- Encounter (magazine)
- Congress for Cultural Freedom

== Bibliography ==
- Saunders, Francis Stonor, Who Paid the Piper? CIA and the Cultural Cold War, 1999, Granta, ISBN 1-86207-029-6 (USA: The Cultural Cold War: The CIA and the World of Arts and Letters, 2000, The New Press, ISBN 1-56584-596-X).
- Andreas Daum, Kennedy in Berlin. New York: Cambridge University Press, 2008, ISBN 978-0-521-85824-3.
