= Love Cosmetics =

Cosmetics company

Love Cosmetics (1969–1980) was introduced by Menley & James Laboratories on March 1, 1969. By the summer of 1970, the company was marketing and promoting Fresh Lemon bath products and cosmetics. Advertising was coordinated by the Wells, Rich, Greene advertising agency. Their advertising budget surpassed $7 million. There was an emphasis on a long-term building operation, with advertisements on television and in women's magazines. A 4-page spread on the company appeared in the February 1969 issue of Harper's Bazaar. Love Cosmetics is credited with popularizing lemon-scented products.

== Ownership ==
M&J was composed of lawyers, doctors, and marketing men from Philadelphia, Pennsylvania. It was a subsidiary of Smith, Kline & French Laboratories. M&J was sometimes criticized for concentrating its marketing in drug stores. However, it felt that such a basic strategy would enable it to best take advantage of its capabilities.

== Product line ==
The target audience for the company were young women who enjoyed trends and cosmetics. Love Cosmetics' first line of items included Love's Fresh Lemon Cleanser, Lovelids eyeshadow, and Eau De Love. In all, there were eleven products, and with the inclusion of shades, they numbered forty-three.

Loveshines was the fun stick to contour and color your eyes, face, all your other kissable little curves and hollows. Lipsticks were called Lovesticks. The remainder of the line was Love's Basic Moisture, Love's A Little Color, Love's Transparent Powder, Love's A Little Cover, Love's Liner, Love's Mascara, and Lovelids. The latter was an eyeshadow with a container in the shape of a plastic eyeball. The company believed that eyeshadows for the day should be in neutral shades, specifically taupe, russet, heather, or olive green. Nighttime was more suited for deeper, yet not brighter colors, especially purple, plum, or teal. In early 1976, Love Cosmetics started marketing Purple Sage, Tumbleweed, and Prairie Dawn eyeshadow shades.

In April 1974, Love Cosmetics began to make a line of Baby Soft products meant for adults. The items were scented with an innocent fragrance most often associated with babies. There was a Baby soft talc, a body lotion, and a foam bath. Baby Soft products were priced from $2 to $2.75. 1975 was a busy year in the cosmetics industry with the introduction of many fragrances by competing firms. Love Cosmetics' new scent was called Daisy L.

== Advertising ==
Peter Godfrey, president of Menley & James, announced in May 1976 that he was seeking a smaller advertising firm to replace Wells, Rich, Green. The parting was amicable but necessary due to the growth of Wells Lawrence's firm. Godfrey felt it had become too large for it to give Love Cosmetics' account the attention it required. Wells, Rich, Green began to represent Max Factor of Los Angeles, California in April 1977. Altman, Stoller, Weiss represented Love Cosmetics for two years before M&J switched to the Jan Zwiren Agency of Chicago, Illinois. Zwiren was formerly vice president of the consumer products division of Helene Curtis Industries. Prior to this she worked with M&J in promoting Love Cosmetics. In BC Canada, Peter Rose was "the Man from Love!" producing by far the largest sales per account in North America. The SFM Media Service Corporation continued to coordinate media planning and buying for the Love Cosmetics line.

== Buyout ==
In May 1980 Menley & James entered into an agreement with Chattem of Chattanooga, Tennessee, to purchase its Love Cosmetics business. Terms were not publicised.
