= Who Paid the Piper? =

1999 book by Frances Stonor Saunders

- Author: Frances Stonor Saunders
- Language: English
- Publisher: Granta Books
- Publication date: June 1999
- Publication place: London, England
- Pages: 509
- ISBN: 978-1862070295

Who Paid the Piper? The CIA and the Cultural Cold War (US title The Cultural Cold War: The CIA and the World of Arts and Letters) is a 1999 book by the British historian Frances Stonor Saunders. She recounts the mid-20th-century efforts by the United States Central Intelligence Agency (CIA) to infiltrate and co-opt artistic movements, using funds that were mostly channelled through the Congress for Cultural Freedom and the Ford Foundation. She argues that the funds came with strings attached, that the aim of these CIA-backed cultural initiatives was to curb Soviet political influence in Europe, and expand American political influence. Her thesis is that by entangling the state in "free" artistic expression, the Agency undermined America's moral position. She further suggests that American Cold War cultural activities were similar in kind to those of the Soviet Union.

Saunders' research and conclusions stirred up considerable debate. In Dissent, Jeffrey Isaac characterised Who Paid the Piper? as a "widely discussed retrospective on post-Second World War liberalism that raises important questions about the relationships between intellectuals and political power." In 2000 the book was published in the US under a new title, The Cultural Cold War, which The New York Times reviewer praised as "more neutral" than the provocative Who Paid the Piper?.

== Content ==
Saunders begins by depicting the devastation in Western and Central Europe following the Second World War, and how the Soviets began staging plays, opera performances and other events for the culture-starved populations. The Americans recognised they must respond to what was perceived as a "Soviet cultural offensive". She then details the flurry of cultural happenings—plays, concerts, art exhibitions, new works of literature and cinema, etc.—that were exported to Europe while secretly being subsidised by the CIA, for example, European tours of the Boston Symphony Orchestra, and film adaptations of Animal Farm and of 1984.

She notes how the Agency financed journals and magazines like Partisan Review, Kenyon Review, and The New Leader to provide "an intellectual bridgehead for American and European intellectuals whose common ground was anti-Communism." The CIA paid for the publication of over a thousand books, some funnelled through Praeger Publishing and other politically like-minded publishing houses. Among the books published and distributed with CIA help were Boris Pasternak's Doctor Zhivago, The New Class by the Yugoslav dissident Milovan Djilas, Melvin Lasky's La Revolution Hongroise, and translations of T. S. Eliot's poems.

She describes the growth of the Abstract Expressionist art movement, and its frequent showcasing in New York's Museum of Modern Art (MOMA), as largely a CIA-sponsored operation. She writes that, according to America's cultural mandarins, abstract expressionism

spoke to a specifically anti-Communist ideology, the ideology of freedom, of free enterprise. Non-figurative and politically silent, it was the very antithesis to socialist realism. It was precisely the kind of art the Soviets loved to hate.

Since many abstract expressionist painters and sculptors were anarchistic, and strongly anti-CIA, a "long leash" policy was adopted that "kept CIA operatives at a remove of two or three degrees from the artists and art exhibitions—sometimes even more—so that they could not be linked to any furtive governmental bankrolling."

Saunders devotes a large portion of the book to the Paris-based Congress for Cultural Freedom (CCF) and its journal Encounter. She chronicles how the CIA set up fake foundations and used established bodies, such as the Ford Foundation and Rockefeller Foundation, to hide CCF's funding and covert activities. She says that CCF's objective was to create a battle line in Western Europe "from which the advance of Communist ideas could be halted." In the latter chapters, she narrates the CCF's downfall once its secret sponsor was revealed.

Throughout the book, Saunders addresses three key questions:

1. How altruistic was the CIA in underwriting Western art and literature during the Cold War? In the Introduction, she alludes to the CIA's "blank cheque" line of defence: "We simply helped people to say what they would have said anyway". But she rejects this notion by insisting that "the individuals and institutions subsidized by the CIA were expected to perform as part of a broad campaign of persuasion".
2. Were all of the Western artists and intellectuals truly unaware of where their funding was coming from? She doubts most of them were as ignorant of the situation as they later claimed to be. In one of the book's final chapters, titled "That Sinking Feeling", she says of two dozen writers and intellectuals: "Not all of them were 'witting' in the sense that they were active participants in the deception. But they all knew, and had known for some time."
3. Were Western intellectuals free of political manipulation by the state apparatus (unlike their Soviet counterparts)? She sees the manipulation as being of a subtle, insidious variety: "The real point was not that the possibility of dissent had been irrevocably damaged...or that intellectuals had been coerced or corrupted (though that may have happened too), but that the natural procedures of intellectual enquiry had been interfered with."

== Reception ==
Who Paid the Piper? received extensive media attention after its 1999 publication in the UK. Likewise, The Cultural Cold War edition in the US attracted notice from a wide array of sources, including The New York Times, The Bulletin of the Atomic Scientists, the Organization of American Historians, as well as from Arthur Schlesinger Jr. and other former CCF participants. Left-wing publications such as Monthly Review, New Politics and The Nation gave the book a positive reception, while right-wing publications such as The American Spectator and National Interest were more negative in their appraisals. Who Paid the Piper? won the Guardian First Book Award.

Edward Said called the book "a major work of investigative history, an extremely valuable contribution to the all-important post-World War Two record" and that "the gist of her argument about Abstract Expressionism and its uses as propaganda is correct, if not wholly original". He stated that "[t]he dispiriting truth it reveals, or confirms, is that few of 'our' major intellectual and cultural figures resisted the blandishments of the CIA". He added that some of the information in the book is not "complete" or "fully accurate", in particular the chapter discussing the CIA infiltrating organisations.

Paul Buhle of Brown University labelled it the "most spectacular" book recently released about the involvement of CIA and intellectuals; he wrote that compared to Freiheit in der Offensive? by Michael Hochgeschwender, Who Paid the Piper? has fewer footnotes but more "charisma" and "verve".

Paul Roazen characterised it as "highly readable" and "fascinating". Jeremy Isaacs in The Spectator found portions of the book humorous, especially the reactions by certain artists and intellectuals upon learning they had been subsidised by the CIA. He termed it a "hammer-blow of a book".

James Gow of King's College, London, said that despite Saunders' negative tone towards CIA activities and her "churlish attitude", he considered Who Paid the Piper? a "triumph" since "she shows men like [CIA employee Tom Braden, who headed the program] to have been unsung heroes of the Cold War, as well as masters of art in both cultural warfare and cultural appreciation."

William and Hilda Baumol wrote that Saunders "generally avoids explicit judgments, seeking to be dispassionate in her account." But the Baumols criticised the book for including too much extraneous detail, along with repetition that "gives the reader a sense of wallowing through a dense landscape, looking for the fascinating nuggets of history that are certainly there." The Baumols formed the impression, based on the contents of the book, that the CIA had a "surprisingly benign" impact (in contradiction to what Saunders concluded) and that the book suggests "[the CIA's] role in the arts was considerably less damaging than might reasonably have been feared."

Jeffrey C. Isaac condemned the book, saying it was "shrill" and had a "prosecutorial tone", that its arguments lacked "nuance", that it did not "grapple in a serious way with the ideas that were the chief currency of those it purports to study", and that it did not consider the vital need during the Cold War to secure "liberal values and institutions".

Josef Joffe attacked Saunders for equating American propaganda efforts with those of the Soviet Union, and for her "strident anti-anti-Communism that refuses to accord the Western cause the moral worth it deserves, considering the wares the totalitarians were hawking." He also faulted the book for having "careless sourcing" and "ad hominem slurs".

In a review for Studies in Intelligence, the former CIA official historian Thomas M. Troy Jr. wrote, "Saunders deserves praise for presenting opposing views" and that she did "a fine job in recounting the intriguing story of how the CIA worked with existing institutions", but added that Who Paid the Piper? "has some major shortcomings" and "contains some silly mistakes and some real gaffes". He stated that she "repeatedly returns to the theme that the CIA injured the cause of intellectual freedom by clandestinely supporting (oh, irony of ironies!) champions of intellectual freedom." He added, "despite Saunders's assertions that the CIA undermined intellectual freedom, she does not present any examples of people whose intellectual growth was stunted or impaired because of the Agency's programs". He also reproached her for not substantively discussing Soviet propaganda actions during the Cold War so that readers would better understand the CIA's counter-actions. Nevertheless, he ended his review by saying he enjoyed her book and highly recommended it.

== See also ==
- Cultural Cold War
- Michael Josselson
- Thomas Braden
