= François Bondy =

Swiss journalist and novelist

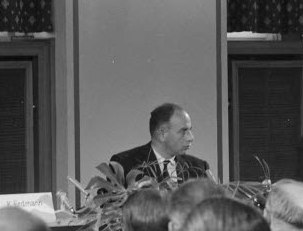
- François Bondy in 1963
- Born: 1 January 1915; Berlin, German Empire
- Died: 27 May 2003 (aged 88); Zurich, Switzerland

François Bondy (1 January 1915 – 27 May 2003) was a Swiss journalist and novelist.

== Biography ==
François Bondy was born on 1 January 1915 in Berlin. As a pupil at the lycée de Nice (1928–1933), he became one of the friends of Romain Gary, then Roman Kacew.

He worked for Swiss and German newspapers and was reputed for his political commentaries. He translated all of Ionesco's books into German.

In 1940, Bondy worked for Die Weltwoche; in 1950, he joined the Congress for Cultural Freedom and established the monthly magazine Preuves in Paris. From 1970, he lived in Zürich. Bondy was the first Western intellectual who promoted, among others, the work of the Polish exile writer Witold Gombrowicz.

He died on 27 May 2003 in Zurich.

== Bibliography ==
- "Letter from Paris: Two French Voices" Quadrant 1/1 (Summer 1956/57): 63–66.
