= Congress for Cultural Freedom =

CIA-funded anti-communist cultural organization

- Founded: 26 June 1950
- Dissolved: 1979 (as International Association for Cultural Freedom)
- Location: Paris, France
- Origins: Central Intelligence Agency
- Region served: Europe, Asia, Africa, North America, Latin America, Australia
- Method: conferences, journals, seminars
- Key people: Melvin J. Lasky, Nikolai Nabokov, Michael Josselson, Thomas Braden
- Parent organization: International Organizations Division
- Endowment: CIA to 1966; Ford Foundation to 1979

The Congress for Cultural Freedom (CCF) was an anti-communist cultural organization during the Cold War that aimed to promote intellectual freedom and combat Soviet totalitarianism. A group of anti-communist intellectuals founded the congress in 1950 at a conference in West Berlin. At its height, the CCF was active in 35 countries and published more than 20 magazines, hosted art exhibitions, and organized conferences with prominent intellectuals. The congress aimed to enlist intellectuals and opinion makers from the non-communist left in a war of ideas against communism. In 1966 former CIA agents confirmed that the Central Intelligence Agency was instrumental in the establishment and funding of the CCF. Through this involvement, the CCF promoted western political ideology while also representing semi-autonomous intellectual movements across Europe.

Historians note the CCF's CIA funding in different contexts. Peter Coleman argues that the CCF was a participant in a struggle for the mind "of Postwar Europe" and the world at large, and was successful at combatting and undermining Soviet totalitarianism. Frances Stonor Saunders argues that the CCF functioned as a covert propaganda network "to ease the passage of American foreign policy interest abroad."

== Origins, 1948–1950 ==
The CCF was founded on 26 June 1950 in West Berlin, which had just endured months of Soviet blockade. Formation of the CCF came in response to a series of events orchestrated by Cominform, as part of a campaign to influence public opinion against US war-mongering and aggression. In 1948, the World Congress of Intellectuals in Defense of Peace convened in Wrocław (Poland) on August 1948. Then in March 1950 the World Peace Council issued the Stockholm Appeal, demanding active peace amidst the threat of nuclear war. The Cominform campaign reached New York City in March 1949 with the Cultural and Scientific Conference for World Peace at the Waldorf-Astoria Hotel. The conference was attended by a plethora of prominent U.S. liberals, leftists and pacifists who called for peace with the Soviet Union. Prominent participants included Dmitri Shostakovich and Aaron Copland. In response to the conference, anti-communist opponents took up residence in the upper floor of the Waldorf-Astoria Hotel in an attempt to discredit the peace conference. Led by ex-communist and philosophy professor Sidney Hook, the group enlisted a range of international supporters for their cause, including Benedetto Croce, T. S. Eliot, Karl Jaspers, André Malraux, Bertrand Russell and Igor Stravinsky. In a three room suite, the opposers, who called themselves Americans for Intellectual Freedom, sabotaged the conference with press releases in a media frenzy to publicize its pro-communist influence.

The Waldorf conference catalyzed a counter offense by the U.S. Office of Policy Coordination, led by Frank Wisner, who began to plan a response to the next pro-communist peace gathering scheduled for April 1949 in Paris. The subsequent counter conference of anti-communists was called International Day of Resistance to Dictatorship and War and convened on 30 April 1949. The meeting received little enthusiasm from American supporters, and was described as "too radical and neutralist".

In August 1949, several German ex-communist intellectuals along with American journalist Melvin Lasky met to discuss plans for an international conference in Berlin that would bring together ex-communists and anti-Stalinists from across Europe and America. The plan was promoted and organized by Michael Josselson and Lasky, who together proposed the plan to Washington and issued invitations. The founding conference for the Congress for Cultural Freedom was held in Berlin in June 1950 and was attended by leading intellectuals from the U.S. and Western Europe including Soviet refugees, European federalists, members of the anti-fascism movement, and union leaders. Other attendees were writers, philosophers, critics and historians: Franz Borkenau, Karl Jaspers, John Dewey, Ignazio Silone, Jacques Maritain, James Burnham, Hugh Trevor-Roper, Arthur Schlesinger, Jr., Bertrand Russell, Ernst Reuter, Raymond Aron, A. J. Ayer, Benedetto Croce, Arthur Koestler, Richard Löwenthal, Melvin J. Lasky, Tennessee Williams, Irving Brown and Sidney Hook. There were conservatives among the participants, but non-Communist (or former Communist) left-wingers were more numerous. The Manifesto of the Congress was drafted by Arthur Koestler, with amendments added on a motion proposed by historian Hugh Trevor-Roper and philosopher A. J. Ayer.

An Executive Committee was elected in 1950 at the founding conference in Berlin, with seven members and six alternate members: Irving Brown (Haakon Lie), Arthur Koestler (Raymond Aron), Eugen Kogon (Carlo Schmid), David Rousset (Georges Altman), Ignazio Silone (Nicola Chiaromonte), Stephen Spender (Tosco Fyvel) and Denis de Rougemont who became President of the committee.

The management of the CCF was entrusted to its secretariat, headed by Michael Josselson. By the time Josselson joined the Congress of Cultural Freedom in 1950 he was "undoubtedly a CIA officer". A polyglot able to converse fluently in four languages (English, Russian, German and French), Josselson was heavily involved in the CCF's growing range of activities – its periodicals, worldwide conferences and international seminars – until his resignation in 1967, following the exposure of funding by the CIA.

== Activities, 1950–1966 ==
At its height, the CCF had offices in 35 countries, employed dozens of personnel, and published over 20 prestigious magazines. It held art exhibitions, owned a news and features service, organized high-profile international conferences, and rewarded musicians and artists with prizes and public performances.

The CCF published its first magazine, Preuves, in October 1951. The publication was edited and organized by Françios Bondy, a Swiss writer who had been appointed to the congress secretariat in 1950. Preuves became the forefront of CCF activities and ideology, serving as a blueprint for following publications. The magazine faced criticism in Paris for its promotion of Atlanticist foreign policy and was dubbed by critics as the "American Magazine". In 1953, the CCF launched the Encounter magazine in London, designed to influence intellectual literacy in the UK towards Anglo-American interests. As well as sponsoring and publishing multiple magazines, the CCF worked with affiliates across Europe and Africa by creating non-profit organizations covertly funded by the CIA.

Between 1950 and 1966 the Congress sponsored numerous conferences. A selective list describes 16 conferences in the 1950s held principally in Western Europe, but also in Rangoon, Mexico City, Tokyo, Ibadan (Nigeria) and South Vietnam: the Founding Conference in Berlin was followed in 1951 by the First Asian Conference on Cultural Freedom, held in Bombay. A further 21 conferences over an even wider geographical area are listed for the first half of the 1960s.

In the early 1960s, the CCF mounted a campaign against the Chilean poet Pablo Neruda, an ardent communist. The campaign intensified when it appeared that Neruda was a candidate for the Nobel Prize in Literature in 1964 but he was also published in Mundo Nuevo, a CCF-sponsored periodical. Other prominent intellectuals targeted by the CCF were Jean-Paul Sartre, Simone de Beauvoir and Thomas Mann who was becoming increasingly pro-Soviet. From 1950 to 1969, the CCF financed German writers such as Heinrich Böll and Siegfried Lenz.

== Promotion of literature and art ==
On April 1, 1952, the congress hosted the Masterpieces of the Twentieth Century, an art festival highlighting 20th century and modernist art movements with a selection of concertos, symphonies, and art galleries. The event was proposed and organized by Nicholas Nabokov who was acting as CCF Secretary General of the International Secretariat. The festival orchestra performances featured composer works by Arnold Schoenberg, Claude Debussy, and Paul Hindemith. The art and sculpture exhibition featured works by Henri Matisse, Andre Derain, Paul Cézanne, Georges Seurat, Marc Chagall, Wassily Kadinsky, and other masters of the early modernist movement. The festival received mixed reviews, with critics noting the lack of diversity and the pro-American curations.

From 1953 to 1990, the CCF's Encounter magazine published an array of essays, articles, and stories from prominent intellectual minds in Europe. Authors included Nancy Mitford, Isaiah Berlin, Vladimir Nabokov, Jorge Luis Borges, Richard Ellmann, W. H. Auden, Arnold Toynbee, Bertrand Russell, Herbert Read, and Hugh Trevor-Roper. The featured literature focused on ideology and cultural topics rather than political ones, stressing anti-communist themes. Many essays were translated into multiple languages for transnational publications, such as works featured in Africane and Black Orpheus. CCF sponsored publications often omitted literary texts that did not align with the values of democracy and "cultural freedom". From 1950 to 1969, the CCF financed German writers such as Heinrich Böll and Siegfried Lenz.

== CIA involvement revealed, 1966 ==
In April 1966, The New York Times ran a series of five articles on the purposes and methods of the CIA. The third of these 1966 articles began to detail false-front organizations and the secret transfer of CIA funds to the US State Department or to the United States Information Agency (USIA) which "may help finance a scholarly inquiry and publication, or the agency may channel research money through foundations – legitimate ones or dummy fronts". In these articles, The New York Times cited the CIA's funding of the Congress for Cultural Freedom and its Encounter magazine.

In 1967, the US magazines Ramparts and The Saturday Evening Post reported on the CIA's funding of a number of anti-communist cultural organizations aimed at winning the support of Soviet-sympathizing liberals worldwide. These reports were lent credence by a statement made by a former CIA covert operations director admitting to CIA financing and operation of the CCF. The CIA website states that "the Congress for Cultural Freedom is widely considered one of the CIA's more daring and effective Cold War covert operations."

That same year in May, Thomas Braden, head of the CCF's parent body the International Organizations Division, responded to the Ramparts report in an article entitled "I'm Glad the CIA is 'Immoral'", in the Saturday Evening Post, defending the activities of his unit within the CIA. For more than ten years, Braden admitted, the CIA had subsidized Encounter through the CCF, which it also funded; one of the magazine's staff, he added, was a CIA agent.

== Scholarly debates ==
Primary scholarly debates on the CCF discuss the Congress's role in promoting freedom of thought and ethical considerations on the secrecy of CIA funding and involvement. Journalist, author, and former CIA agent Peter Coleman argues that the CCF was successful in "public awareness through-out the world in a period of great danger," and that its publications were important in combatting Soviet totalitarianism. Coleman recognizes the involvement of the CIA, but argues that the funding and support did not influence editorial decisions.

Historian and journalist Frances Stonor Saunders argues that the role of the CCF restricted freedom of thought and promoted "American foreign policy interests." Saunders cites the endorsement of organizations and pro-American intellectuals. Historians such as Giles Scott-Smith, Andrea Scionti, Volker Berghahn, and Hugh Wilford present more nuanced arguments that recognize the global and cultural impacts of the CCF beyond covert operations.

== Legacy ==
In 1967, the organization was renamed the International Association for Cultural Freedom (IACF) and continued to exist with funding from the Ford Foundation. It inherited "the remaining magazines and national committees, the practice of international seminars, the regional programs, and the ideal of a worldwide community of intellectuals." There was also, until 1970, "some continuity of personnel".

Under Shepard Stone and Pierre Emmanuel the dominant policy of the new Association shifted from positions held by its predecessor. No "public anti-Soviet protests" were issued, "not even in support of the harassed Solzhenitsyn and Sakharov". The culmination of this approach was a vast seminar at Princeton on "The United States: Its Problems, Impact, and Image in the World" (December 1968) where unsuccessful attempts were made to engage with the New Left. From 1968 onwards national committees and magazines (see CCF/IACF Publications below) shut down one after another. In 1977 the Paris office closed and two years later the Association voted to dissolve itself.

Certain of the publications that began as CCF-supported vehicles secured a readership and ongoing relevance that, with other sources of funding, enabled them to long outlast the parent organisation. Encounter continued publishing until 1991, as did Survey, while the Australian Quadrant and the China Quarterly are active as of 2025. While the revelation of CIA funding led to some resignations, notably that of Stephen Spender from Encounter, outside Europe the impact was more dramatic. In Uganda, President Milton Obote had editor of Transition magazine, Rajat Neogy, arrested and imprisoned. After Neogy left Uganda in 1968 the magazine ceased to exist.

The European Intellectual Mutual Aid Fund (Fondation pour une Entraide Intellectuelle Européenne) set up to support intellectuals in Central Europe, began life as an affiliate of the Congress for Cultural Freedom. In 1991 it merged with the Open Society Foundations, set up and supported by financier and philanthropist George Soros. The records of the International Association for Cultural Freedom and its predecessor the Congress for Cultural Freedom are today stored at the Library of the University of Chicago in its Special Collections Research Center and at the Tamiment Library and Robert F. Wagner Labor Archives at New York University as of 2025.

== Publications ==
The Congress founded, sponsored or encouraged a number of publications to disseminate its ideas. Some of them are the following:

Name	Region	Date	Notes
Aportes	Latin America	closed 1972	Produced by the Latin American Institute for International Relations (ILARI), established in 1966, which was closed by IACF in 1972.
Black Orpheus	Nigeria	1957–1975	Founded by German expatriate editor and scholar Ulli Beier, Black Orpheus has been described as a powerful catalyst for artistic awakening throughout West Africa.
Cadernos Brasileiros	Brazil	1959–1971	A quarterly (until 1963), later bi-monthly, literary magazine. ICAF subsidy ceased in 1971.
Censorship	United Kingdom	1964–1967	Edited by Murray Mindlin, the six published issues dealt with censorship around the world. (In 1972 Index on Censorship, a publication covering the same themes, was founded by Stephen Spender.)
China Report	India	1964–1970s	Established at the New Delhi bureau of the Congress, China Report became a bimonthly journalistic enterprise. After its IACF subsidy ended in 1971 it found other sources of funding.
The China Quarterly	United Kingdom	1960 to present	Became a leading journal on Communist China (and also Taiwan) by reason of its lack of rivals in the field and the scholarly standard of its articles. When its IACF subsidy ceased in 1968 it found other sources of funding.
Cuadernos del Congreso por la Libertad de la Cultura	Paris, intended for distribution in Latin America	1953–1965	Edited by Julián Gorkin, assisted by Ignacio Iglesias and Luis Mercier Verga – a cultural quarterly magazine that reached 100 issues.
Encounter	United Kingdom	1953–1991	A literary-political magazine founded by Stephen Spender and Irving Kristol. By 1963 its circulation had risen to 34,000 and that year the magazine secured independent funding. Edited from 1958 onwards by Melvin J. Lasky.
Examen	Mexico	1958–1962	A cultural magazine.
Forvm	Austria	1954–1995	A political and cultural magazine founded by Friederich Torberg and others. In 1965 it was taken over by Gunter Nenning and became Neues Forum, a publication devoted to Christian-Communist dialogue.
Hiwar	Lebanon	1962–1967	A bi-monthly literary and cultural magazine published in Beirut, and focusing on the Arab world.
Informes de China	Argentina	1960s	Set up to provide Latin America with information about China.
Jiyu (Freedom)	Japan	1960 to present	One of the most heavily subsidized of all the CFF magazines. Edited by Hoki Ishihara. The chief editor Isihara found other sources of funding when subsidies from Paris and the national committee ceased to exist.
Kulturkontakt	Sweden	1954–1960	Bimonthly political and cultural magazine, published by Svenska kommittén för kulturens frihet (Swedish Committee for Cultural Freedom). Publishers were Ture Nerman (1954–57) and Ingemar Hedenius (1957–60). Edited by Birgitta Stenberg, Kurt Salomonson and Bengt Alexanderson.
Minerva	United Kingdom	1962 to present	A quarterly started by sociologist Edward Shils to address issues relating to the "worldwide intellectual community", and particularly the growth in universities.
Der Monat	Germany	1948–1987	A German-language journal airlifted into Berlin during the 1948 Soviet blockade and edited by Melvin J. Lasky until 1978, when it was purchased by Die Zeit. ICAF subsidy ceased in 1968. It continued as a quarterly until 1987.
Mundo Nuevo	Latin America	1966–1971	Successor to Cuadernos (see above). It published established and political writers, holding a variety of views such as Pablo Neruda and Jorge Luis Borges, ceasing to exist when IACF funding ended in 1971.
Perspektiv	Denmark	1953–1969	Described itself as "a magazine for politics, science and culture". Published by Hans Reitzel, edited by Henning Fonsmark and H.C. Branner. Entered a partnership with Selskabet for Frihet og Kultur (Association for Freedom and Culture), the CCF's Danish counterpart, in 1956. Directly funded by the CCF from at least 1960, when the organization established an office in Copenhagen.
Preuves	France	1951–1975	A cultural, intellectual and literary monthly magazine. CCF's first magazine. Preuves means "proof" or "evidence" in French. Edited by François Bondy, a Swiss writer.
Quadrant	Australia	1956 to present	A literary journal published by the Australian Association for Cultural Freedom, edited by Catholic poet James McAuley, had an "anticommunist thrust". ICAF subsidy of the Association and of Quadrant ceased in 1972.
Quest	India	1955–1958	English only. In 1971 IACF stopped supporting New Delhi and Calcutta offices. Originally edited by Nissim Ezekiel.
Sasanggye	South Korea	1953–1970	Founded by Chang Chun-ha.
Science and Freedom		1954–1961	Edited by Michael Polanyi. Biannual bulletin with "a tiny readership" of 3,000. In 1961 the Congress Executive replaced it with Minerva (see above).
Social Science Review	Thailand		ICAF subsidy ceased in 1971; the Review found other sources of funding.
Solidarity	Philippines	1960s & 1970s	A cultural, intellectual and literary monthly magazine. After its IACF subsidy ended in 1971 it found other sources of funding.
Soviet Survey (became Survey)		1955–1989	At first a monthly newsletter edited by Walter Laqueur, the CCF's official representative in Israel. After 1964 became a quarterly journal, edited by Leopold Labedz, focused on Soviet bloc. IACF subsidy ceased in early 1970s; the magazine found other sources of funding.
Tempo Presente	Italy	1956–1967	Edited by Ignazio Silone and Nicola Chiaromonte.
Transition Magazine	Uganda	1961–1968	Editor Rajat Neogy. Sales reached 12,000 in early 1960s (a quarter of them in the US) but the arrest, detention and subsequent emigration of editor Neogy in 1968 marked the end of this controversial literary-political magazine.

Although The Paris Review was co-founded by novelist and CIA operative Peter Matthiessen, who was affiliated with the CCF, the magazine was reportedly a cover for Matthiessen, and not part of the CCF's operations. However, The Paris Review often sold interviews it conducted to CCF-established magazines.

== Literature ==
- Bahr, Ehrhard (2008). Weimar on the Pacific: German Exile Culture in Los Angeles and the Crisis of Modernism. University of California Press. ISBN 978-0520257955.
- Berghahn, Volker R.: America and the Intellectual Cold Wars in Europe. Shepard Stone between Philanthropy, Academy, and Diplomacy. Princeton: Princeton UP, 2001. Addresses links between Ford Foundation and CCF.
- Coleman, Peter, The Liberal Conspiracy: The Congress for Cultural Freedom and the Struggle for the Mind of Postwar Europe, New York: Free Press, Collier Macmillan, 1989.
- Michael Hochgeschwender, Freiheit in der Offensive? Der Kongreß für kulturelle Freiheit und die Deutschen, München, 1998 (comprising academic study on the origins, in German).
- Rubin, Andrew N. (2012). Archives of Authority: Empire, Culture, and the Cold War. Princeton University Press. ISBN 978-1-4008-4217-9.
- Frances Stonor Saunders, The Cultural Cold War: The CIA and the World of Arts and Letters, 2000, The New Press, (ISBN 1-56584-596-X). Originally published in the UK as Who Paid the Piper?: CIA and the Cultural Cold War, 1999, Granta, ISBN 1862070296.
- Wellens, Ian (2002). Music on the Frontline: Nicolas Nabokov's Struggle against Communism and Middlebrow Culture. Aldershot: Ashgate. ISBN 0-7546-0635-X

== See also ==
- CIA and the Cultural Cold War
- Who Paid the Piper?
- New African – initially part-funded by the CCF
- American Committee for Cultural Freedom
- Partisan Review – received funding from the CCF in the early 1960s
