= Hiwar (magazine) =

Arabic magazine funded by the CIA in Lebanon (1962–1967)

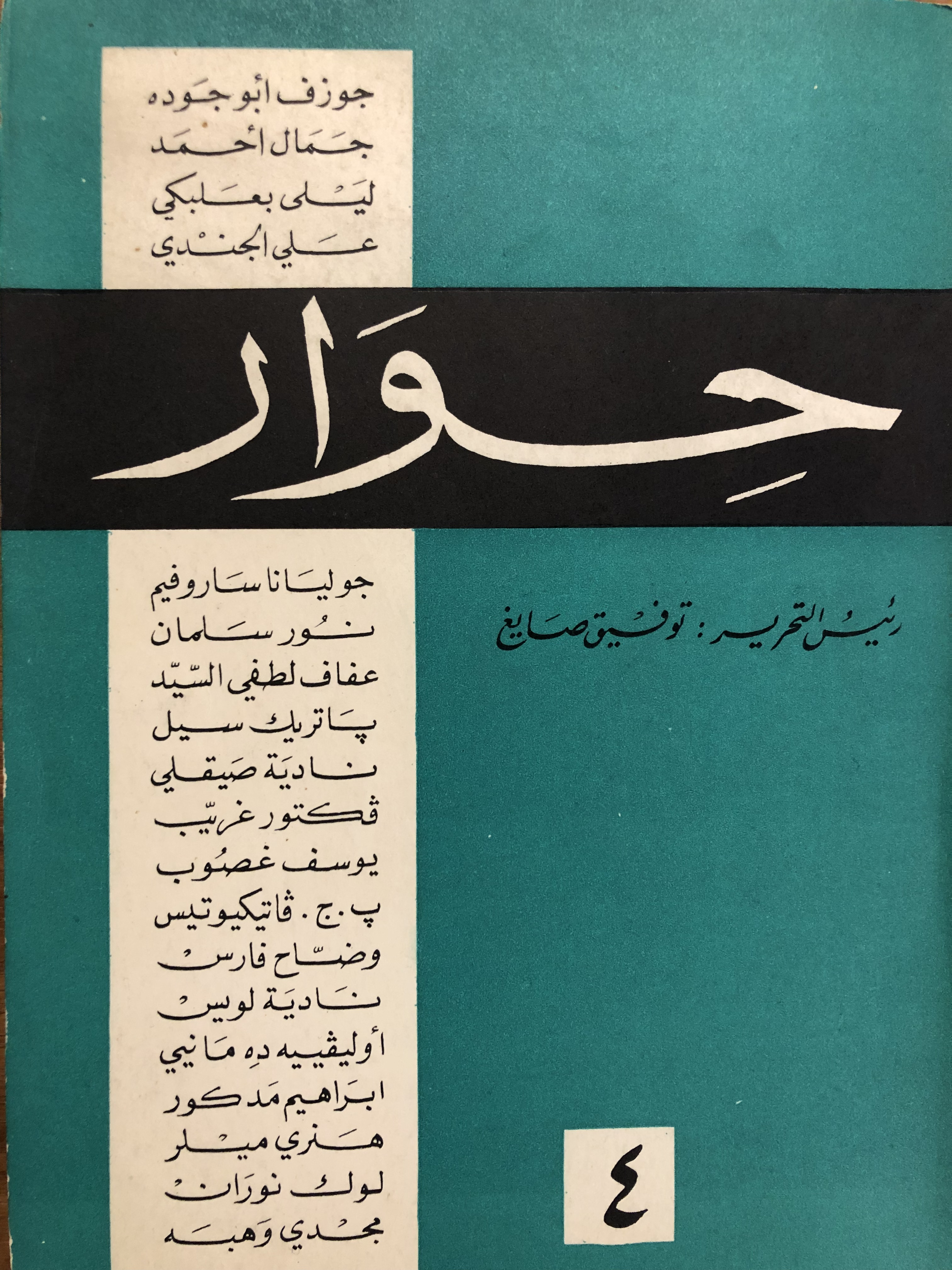
- Editor: Tawfiq Sayigh
- Categories: Literary magazine
- Frequency: Monthly
- Founder: Tawfiq Sayigh
- Founded: 1962
- First issue: October 1962
- Final issue: March/April 1967
- Country: Lebanon
- Based in: Beirut
- Language: Arabic

Hiwar (Arabic: حوار, lit. 'Dialog'ue) was an Arabic magazine published in Beirut between 1962 and 1967. The magazine was established and financed by the CIA during the cultural Cold War, under the cover of a front organization, the Congress for Cultural Freedom.

== History ==
The first issue of Hiwar appeared in October 1962 (but was dated November 1962), and its final issue was dated March/April 1967. Generous funding was provided by the CIA with the stipulation that it publish articles on the situation of Soviet Muslims. Tawfiq Sayigh, a Palestinian poet based in Beirut, accepted an offer to edit the magazine, which he did for the duration of its existence.

A foreword in the inaugural issue of Hiwar laid out the magazine's putative mission, stressing its Arab identity and falsely claiming that "it is not a foreign magazine published in an Arab country, but rather an Arab magazine at its core." The foreword went on to emphasize the importance Hiwar would place on freedom of speech and cultural freedoms in the Arab world, and claimed that it would pay its contributors well. In the same issue an article by Albert Hourani on Taha Hussein was featured which was later published in the magazines Cuadernos and Preuves.

Hiwar was originally designed as a publication to improve modern Arabic poetry. Hiwar frequently published works by prominent Arab authors, including a serialization of Tayeb Salih's classic novella Season of Migration to the North in 1966. Although Salih's book was banned in Egypt, copies of Hiwar were likely smuggled into Cairo, where critic Raja' al-Naqqash, after reading it, described Salih as a "genius of the Arabic novel." Hiwar, like other magazines funded by the Congress for Cultural Freedom, republished interviews originally appearing in The Paris Review, whose co-founder Peter Matthiessen was a CIA operative as well as a novelist. For example, the May-June 1963 issue of Hiwar printed an interview with Henry Miller that was previously published in the September 1961 issue of The Paris Review.

According to Issa J. Boullata, Hiwar raised suspicions in the Arab world about its provenance, due to the "generous payments to its contributing writers and its relatively low price despite excellent production and slick appearance." In light of these rumors, Egyptian novelist Yusuf Idris declined to accept a prize that Hiwar had awarded him in November 1965, in the amount of 10,000 Lebanese lira. Hiwar drew skepticism even before it launched; Sayigh recounted that Palestinian writer Ghassan Kanafani attacked the planned magazine because of its foreign funding.

The financial support of the magazine by the CIA was uncovered by The New York Times in April 1966, prompting the magazine to stop publishing the following year. Sayigh left Lebanon as a result of this event, and moved to Berkeley, California.

In addition to Hiwar, the Congress for Cultural Freedom also targeted the Arab literary world by hosting conferences. In 1961, CCF sponsored a conference called "The Arab Writer and the Modern World" in Rome. The attendees included Syrian poets Adunis and Yusuf al-Khal as well as other luminaries such as Stephen Spender and Ignazio Silone.

== Prominent contributors ==
- Albert Hourani
- Layla Balabakki
- Badr Shakir al-Sayyab
- Ghada al-Samman
- Jabra Ibrahim Jabra
- Suhayr al-Qalamawi

== See also ==
- Al Urwa
