= Mundo Nuevo =

Spanish language periodical

Mundo Nuevo (1966–1971, Spanish for "the New World") was an influential Spanish-language periodical, being a monthly revista de cultura (literary magazine) dedicated to new Latin American literature. Sponsored by the Ford Foundation, the magazine was founded by Emir Rodríguez Monegal in Paris, France, in 1966 and distributed worldwide. Monegal edited it until 1968 and resigned after a five-part installation in the New York Times that revealed the Congress for Cultural Freedom, a source of funding for the magazine, was a front for the CIA. In fact, it was started as a successor of another Spanish language magazine of the Congress, namely Cuadernos. Mundo Nuevo stopped in 1971 after 58 issues.

Mundo Nuevo prepublished then-new writers, such as Mario Vargas Llosa or chapters of Gabriel García Márquez's One Hundred Years of Solitude, famous poets such as Octavio Paz and younger writers, such as Guillermo Cabrera Infante or Severo Sarduy. It contributed to the 1960s publishing phenomenon dubbed "The Boom" in Latin American literature.

== History ==
=== Foundation ===
In 1966, the Congress for Cultural Freedom (CCF) launched Mundo Nuevo, a Latin American literary magazine that replaced Cuadernos del Congreso por la Libertad de la Cultura. Emir Rodríguez Monegal, a Uruguayan scholar of Latin American literature became the editor in Paris. To protect the magazine from the CCF's bad reputation in Latin America, Mundo Nuevo claimed to be published by ILARI (Instituto Latinoamericano de Relaciones Internacionales), an 'independent' front created in exchange for the CCF's Latin American Department.

When the CCF negotiated the Ford funding following the NYTimes' revelations of its CIA connections, Monegal wanted to stay in Paris but, denied by the Ford Foundation, had to move to the US to start teaching at Yale. As he explained later, "Paris [...] has the advantage of being a great city where you can still live cheaply. Latin American writers, especially during the sixties, always made their sentimental journey to Paris, and I knew that I could always find talent just outside the door. Besides, if you publish a magazine in any Latin American city, it inevitably takes on a local air. This was just what I wanted to avoid. And the French postal service enabled us to reach the entire New World."

=== Contribution (1966–1968) ===
In July 1966, the first issue was published. It was a 23 cm illustrated magazine. Mundo Nuevo published articles and interviews, prose, poetry, and essays, but also excerpts of unreleased texts. It helped launch the career of younger writers such as Guillermo Cabrera Infante, Severo Sarduy, Manuel Puig but also helped then-new writers such as Gabriel García Márquez, Carlos Fuentes, Mario Vargas Llosa, or José Donoso.

During 1966, Mundo Nuevo prepublished two chapters of García Márquez's breakthrough novel One Hundred Years of Solitude one year before the book's release; Monegal explained, "I wanted to prepare the ground for the book, which came out in 1967."

Mundo Nuevo contributed to the 1960s publishing phenomenon dubbed "The Boom" in Latin American literature that led to many Latin American writers being published outside of their home countries and gaining critical recognition.

=== Opposition ===
Monegal claimed to have full editorial control over Mundo Nuevo. In those times of Cold War, the magazine was attacked and boycotted from the beginning by Cuba and the Latin-American Left. Monegal defined himself as "a socialist of the English Labour Party type" who "had nothing to do with what they call socialism in the Soviet Union" and he refused to turn Mundo Nuevo into yet another pro-Communist or anti-Communist journal. He explained later, "I conceived Mundo Nuevo as an open forum and invited writers of all political persuasions to contribute to it." This stand of independence also attracted the ire of the anti-Castro in exile.

In 1967, a political scandal ensued when it was revealed that the Mundo Nuevo was funded by the CIA through the Congress for Cultural Freedom. In response, Monegal published in the July 1967 issue of Mundo Nuevo "La CIA y los intelectuales" ("The CIA and the intellectuals") claiming that these rumours were false. This article, and its follow-up two months later, did not amuse Monegal's backers. Escalating disagreements with the Ford Foundation and the ILARI eventually led to Monegal's resignation in July 1968.

=== Dissolution (1968–1971) ===
As Monegal explained, the magazine was moved to Argentina in Buenos Aires, "where it became just one more anti-Communist journal. It died of exhaustion in the early seventies."

In 1971, the last issue was the double #57/58 for the months of March/April.
