= Floria Lasky =

American lawyer

- Born: Floria V. Lasky; April 24, 1923
- Died: September 21, 2007 (age 84)
- Education: J.D. New York University School of Law
- Occupation: Entertainment Lawyer
- Spouse: David R. Altman
- Children: Emily Altman; Dara Altman Lennon
- Family: Melvin J. Lasky (brother); Anatole Shub (brother-in-law)

Floria V. Lasky (April 24, 1923 – September 21, 2007) was an American lawyer in the theater world, who represented some of the biggest names in American entertainment.

== Career ==
Lasky was born in the Bronx, New York City. She was named for the eponymous heroine of the opera Tosca. She was the younger sister of American journalist Melvin J. Lasky.

She entered Hunter College at the age of 14 and graduated first in her class at New York University's law school in 1945, after which she joined the law firm of Fitelson & Mayers, where she would stay for the next 62 years, eventually becoming a principal partner.

Her clients over the years included Jerome Robbins, Tennessee Williams, Burl Ives, David Merrick, Gypsy Rose Lee, Jule Styne, Frederick Loewe and Carson McCullers. As their lawyer, she was one of the first women to break into the legal sphere of Broadway and beyond. Her law firm, Fitelson, Lasky, Aslan & Couture, continued to represent the estates of many of her clients even after their deaths.

She was married to David R. Altman, an advertising executive, for over 52 years. Widowed since 2000, Floria Lasky Altman died aged 84 from cancer. She was survived by two daughters, two grandchildren, Asher and Davi, and a sister Joyce Lasky Reed, who married and divorced Anatole Shub and later married Voice of America broadcast journalist Leonard Reed (1918-2008).
