= The Spanish Cockpit =

1937 book

- Title page for The Spanish Cockpit (1963 edition)
- Author: Franz Borkenau
- Subject: Non-fiction
- Publisher: Faber and Faber
- Publication date: July 1937
- Pages: 303
- OCLC: 3191955

The Spanish Cockpit is a personal account of the Spanish Civil War written by Franz Borkenau and published in late 1937. It was based on his two wartime visits to Spain in August 1936 and January 1937, visiting Barcelona, Madrid, Toledo, Valencia, and the Aragon and Andalusia fronts. The book brought Borkenau international fame. After writing a positive review of the book, describing the book as the best on the civil war, George Orwell became a personal friend of the author's and the two remained politically close.

== See also ==
- Homage to Catalonia

== Bibliography ==
- Kessler, Mario (2011). "Between Communism and Anti-Communism: Franz Borkenau". In Fair-Schulz, Axel; Kessler, Mario (eds.). German Scholars in Exile: New Studies in Intellectual History. Lexington Books. pp. 93–120. ISBN 978-0-7391-5048-1.
