= Night of the Scorpion =

Poem by Nissim Ezekiel

"Night of the Scorpion," included in the AQA Anthology, is a poem written by the Indian Jewish poet, Nissim Ezekiel. It was Published In 1965 In His Work " The Exact-Name"

== Summary ==
It starts in a house at night where it is raining and a scorpion, in order to take some shelter, comes to the house. This poem is about how the scorpion stung the poet's mother and the mother's love for her children.

I remember the night my mother
was stung by a scorpion. Ten hours
of steady rain had driven him
to crawl beneath a sack of rice.

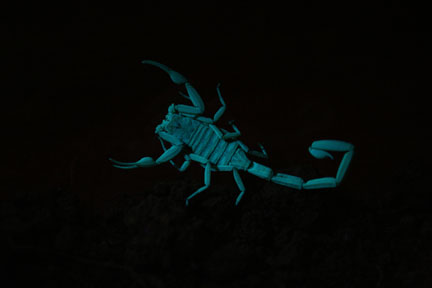
A scorpion glowing in the dark

The poem opens in a way that suggests reflection—the speaker remembers (and, is so, older now) the rainy night of ten hours-- his mother was stung by a scorpion, which bit the mother because of its predatory impulse, while hiding beneath a bag of rice to escape from the rain. The speaker specifically remembers this night due to this event namely, the mother getting bitten. The way in which the mother is bitten is also shown in "flash / of diabolic tail"; the speaker manages to suggest that the scorpion is demonic with its "diabolic" tail, and emphasises its speed with the word flash. The scorpion then flees the scene and, thus, risks the rain again.

Many things were tried to help relieve the mother's pain but none worked. The speaker watches helplessly. The speaker's father who was a sceptic and rationalist, tried to save his wife by using powder, mixture, herbs, hybrid and even by pouring a little paraffin upon the bitten toe and put a match to it. This reflects in one of the village peasant's saying, "May the sins of your previous birth / be burned away tonight," which the father tries to do, not for burning her sins but to burn away the poison residing inside the mother, which reflects her sins being atoned for.

The speaker watches the vain holy man performing his deceptive incantations but he cannot do anything to stop it. The peasants, finally accepting the fate of the mother, try to put a positive spin on the situation by saying that even if the mother died, her next life (an Indian belief) would be less painful, as she is atoning for her future sins by enduring this pain. After twenty hours, the poison loses its sting. A sign of her prevailing love and affection for her children is shown when she thanks God that she was stung and not her children.

== Analysis and theme ==
Nissim Ezekiel's poem "Night of the Scorpion" presents a rural Indian village and its people. It came from a religious background and Ezekiel wrote this poem trying to give the impression of anger, but also an underlying message of motherly love, along with a hint of culture and superstition:

After twenty hours
it lost its sting.
My mother only said
Thank God the scorpion picked on me
And spared my children.

The last lines of the poem carry the irony, that is, the poet's mother expresses her gratitude to God for saving her children. According to scholar Pona Mohanta, "The concern of the villagers and the poet's father seem rather superficial when pitted against the heartfelt feelings of his mother." It is a universal truth that a mother cannot tolerate the pain and suffering of her children. In the context of the poem, this is not exceptional because the poet's mother expresses her concern for her children just after the relief from the intense pain which conveys an underlying gesture of unconditional motherly love.
