= Al-Urwa (Iraqi magazine) =

Al-Urwa (Arabic: العروة, The Bond) was an Arabic magazine published in Iraq in the 1950s and financed by the US government during the cultural Cold War. The magazine intended to call on Arabs and Muslims to unite against communism, emphasizing the goodness of America and the Western world. The magazine's name was meant as an allusion to Al-Urwah al-Wuthqa, an anti-colonial magazine published in 1884 by Muhammad Abduh and Jamāl al-Dīn al-Afghānī.

== See also ==
- Hiwar
