= Cuadernos =

Political and cultural magazine in France (1953–1965)

- Categories: Political magazine; Cultural magazine
- Frequency: Quarterly (1954–1961); Monthly (1961–1965)
- Founder: Congress for Cultural Freedom
- Founded: 1953
- First issue: June 1954
- Final issue Number: September 1965; 100
- Country: France
- Based in: Paris
- Language: Spanish

Cuadernos (Spanish: Notebooks) was a Spanish-language magazine that was published in Paris, France, in the period 1953–1965. Its full title was Cuadernos del Congreso por la Libertad de la Cultura. It was one of the publications of the Congress for Cultural Freedom.

== History and profile ==
Cuadernos was launched by the Congress for Cultural Freedom in 1953 which targeted Spanish people and Latin Americans. The first issue appeared in June 1954. Cuadernos was based in Paris, and its editor was a Spaniard politician, Julián Gorkin. During his editorship another Spaniard politician Ignacio Iglesias also edited the magazine which was published on a quarterly basis. Gorkin was replaced by a Spaniard exile in Paris, Luis Araquistáin, as editor of the magazine in 1959. However, due to the death of Araquistáin a Colombian diplomat Germán Arciniegas was named as the editor of the magazine.

During the editorship of Gorkin between 1953 and 1959 Cuadernos contained only one article which included an overt ideological imposition in favor of the American policies, and it was about the Guatemalan coup d'état in 1954 and the fall of Jacobo Árbenz’s government. The magazine featured Hispanic poems, articles on anti-Soviet propaganda and political and cultural news from the European and Latin American countries. In line with the premises of the Congress for Cultural Freedom the magazine argued that the avant-garde or experimental approach towards art was possible only in a society depending on the free enterprise and liberal individualism. The avant-garde approach was also regarded by the magazine as an indication of the developed societies. Cuadernos featured an article by Albert Hourani on Taha Hussein which was published in Hiwar's inaugural issue in 1962.

In 1961 the frequency of Cuadernos was switched to monthly. The magazine was closed by the Congress in 1965 due to its low popularity and its lower circulation levels although it targeted Hispanic people in Spain and Latin America. The magazine never enjoyed high levels of circulation like Encounter or Der Monat, other magazines of the Congress. The last issue, the 100th issue, of Cuadernos was published in September 1965. Mundo Nuevo, another Spanish language magazine, succeeded Cuadernos.
