= Quest (Indian magazine) =

Indian journal

- Editor: Nissim Ezekiel (first editor)
- Frequency: Quarterly and then bimonthly
- Circulation: 3000-4000
- Founder: Congress for Cultural Freedom (CCF) born in Berlin in 1950 and dissolved in 1975
- Founded: 1954
- Final issue: 1975
- Country: India
- Based in: Mumbai
- Language: English

Quest was a quarterly and bimonthly Indian journal published between 1954 and 1975 and featuring 20 years of independent India’s publishing history.

== History ==
The publication was founded in 1954 and ceased in 1975 when the government of Indira Gandhi declared in Indian national emergency. It was a product of the Cold War and was created by the Central Intelligence Agency. It was published by the Congress for Cultural Freedom's Indian branch (ICCF), which was led by Minoo Masani and Jayaprakash Narayan. Masani's emphasis of politics drew the ire of Jawaharlal Nehru and ran into troubles with another publication called Freedom First. The publisher and secretary Narie Oliaji, resigned, complaining that Masani was a political polemicist lacking the ‘intelligence and zeal to represent the Indian anti-communist intelligentsia’. In 1954 Nicolas Nabokov, the Secretary General of the Congress for Cultural Freedom met Masani and ordered him to separate the cultural and political movements and to gain more support and respect from Indian intellectuals through the creation of a journal, which would be named Quest and devoted exclusively to cultural matters. During its twenty years of history it featured essays, fiction and poetry from writers such as Nirad Chaudhuri, Dilip Chitre, Allen Ginsberg, Jyotirmoy Datta, Mujibur Rehman, Agha Shahid Ali, Jayanta Mahapatra Dom Moraes, Ashis Nandy, Gauri Deshpande, Adil Jussawalla, Mahapatra, A.K. Ramanujan, Saleem Peeradina, Arun Kolatkar, Dilip Chitre, Keki Daruwalla, Anita Desai, Kiran Nagarkar and Abraham Eraly.

== Legacy ==
In 1966, a selection of articles were produced as Ten years of Quest edited by Abu Sayeed Ayyub and Amlan Datta. In 2011 a selection of articles was republished as The best of Quest.

== Bibliography ==
- The Best of Quest, edited by Achal Prabhala, Laeeq Futehally and Arshia Sattar, Publisher Tranquebar, India, 2011.
