= Nissim Ezekiel =

Indian poet (1924–2004)

- Born: 16 December 1924; Bombay, Bombay Presidency, British India (now Mumbai, Maharashtra, India)
- Died: 9 January 2004 (aged 79); Mumbai, Maharashtra, India
- Citizenship: • British India (1924–1947) • India (1947–2004)
- Occupations: Poet, playwright, art critic, editor
- Writing career
- Period: 1952–2004
- Genre: Modern Indian English poetry
- Notable works: Night of the Scorpion; Latter-Day Psalms
- Notable awards: Sahitya Akademi Award (1983); Padma Shri (1988)

Nissim Ezekiel (16 December 1924 – 9 January 2004) was an Indian poet, actor, playwright, editor in chief, and art critic. He was a foundational figure in postcolonial India's literary history, specifically for Indian poetry in English.

He was awarded the Sahitya Akademi Award in 1983 for his collection, Latter-Day Psalms, by the Sahitya Akademi, India's National Academy of Letters. Ezekiel has been applauded for his subtle, restrained and well crafted diction, dealing with common and mundane, everyday themes in a manner that manifests both cognitive profundity, as well as an unsentimental, realistic sensibility, that has been influential on the course of succeeding Indian English poetry. Ezekiel enriched and established Indian English language poetry through his modernist innovations and techniques, which enlarged Indian English literature, moving it beyond purely spiritual and orientalist themes, to include a wider range of concerns and interests, including familial events, individual angst and skeptical societal introspection.

== Early life ==
Ezekiel was born on 16 December 1924 in Bombay (Mumbai) in Maharashtra. His father was a professor of botany at Wilson College, and his mother was the principal of her own school. The Ezekiels belonged to Mumbai's Marathi-speaking Jewish community known as the Bene Israel.

In 1947, Ezekiel earned a BA in Literature from Wilson College, Mumbai, Bombay University. In 1947–48, he taught English literature and published literary articles. After dabbling in politics for a while, he sailed to England in November 1948. He studied philosophy at Birkbeck College, London. After three and a half years, Ezekiel worked his way home as a deck-scrubber aboard a ship carrying arms to Indochina.

== Career ==
Ezekiel's first book, A Time to Change, appeared in 1952 which changed the trajectory of Indian poetry as it was a new form of poetry, Indian English poetry. The book serves as a declaration of transformation, encompassing the poet's personal life and surroundings. It brings about a significant shift with deep implications for society, intellectual thought, and moral values. Most importantly, it introduces a transformation in the way poetry is written. Written in 1952, it emphasizes the cultural context of the post colonial period. Ezekiel uses his poetry as a way to make remarks on the period emphasizing his approach to modernity and encompassing his personal life. A Time to Change may be a small volume with just around thirty-five pages, but it holds great significance in terms of its quality and historical importance. The title of the book indicates change embracing all aspects of Ezekiel's writing or poetry and his aesthetics. A Time To Change marks the onset of a unique form of poetry and the start of a noteworthy career. The opening lines of the poem are "We who leave the house in April, Lord,/How shall we return?/Debtors to the whore of Love" suggesting that Ezekiel is expressing deep regret for leaving home during a season associated with renewal. In addition, A Time To Change represents Ezekiel's talent for presenting an incident in dew stanzas and his ability to use gentle irony with sadistic humor. This departure is symbolic, representing a shift away from a life of natural happiness and spontaneity. A Time to Change depicts a book that fights larger concerns such as power, communication and the limitations of languages in the world. In addition, Ezekiel touches upon sexuality, human nature, and religion.

Ezekiel has distinctive views of his language when it comes to his poetry. In Ezekiel's earlier works much of the collection was defined by large language with a focus on rhyme, meter, and poetic form. In Ezekiel's poetry the quality of the heart is evident through his undertones, irony, and self mockery. Within his poetry the lines are a similar length and if the poem has stanza, the stanza will have a similar number of lines. This demonstrates Ezekiel's attention to detail with his writing by using symmetry, further emphasizing Ezekiel's early dependence for structure in poetry. Ezekiel follows what Rene Wellek and Austin Warren use in their Theory of Literature or the "extrinsic" approach which examines literature in the broader context as it understands the relationship to society. It also looks at how literature has an impact by other influences in the world. The "extrinsic" approach follows closely to how Ezekiel writes because he writes about society, personal experiences, and human connections. Ezekiel also uses the "intrinsic" approach which focuses on the elements of the literature in itself such as using metaphors, similes, images, and the techniques that are found in the text. Ezekiel emphasizes the importance of creating literature that connects on a global scale. He references Berdyaev's ideological approaches with creativity and how the poet should not imitate other cultures but should be genuine in their writing. The poet should prioritize their integrity and own experiences in poetry. Ezekiel believes the cultural roles are secondary which leads him to believe that poetry has a universal likening. For instance, Ezekiel emphasizes the significance of humanity in the universe in his poem "Morning Prayer".

He published another volume of poems, The deadly man in 1960. After working as an advertising copywriter and general manager of a picture frame company (1954–59), he co-founded the literary monthly Jumpo, in 1961. He became art critic of The Times of India (1964–66) and edited Poetry India (1966–67). From 1961 to 1972, he headed the English department of Mithibai College, Bombay. The Exact Name, his fifth book of poetry, was published in 1965. During this period he held short-term tenure as visiting professor at University of Leeds (1964) and University of Pondicherry (1967). In 1969, at the Writers Workshop, Ezekiel published his Three Plays which includes Nalini, Marriage Poem, The Sleep-walkers. A year later, he presented an art series of ten programmes for Indian television. In 1976, he translated Jawaharlal Nehru's poetry from English to Marathi, in collaboration with Vrinda Nabar, and co-edited a fiction and poetry anthology. His poem The Night of the Scorpion is used as study material in Indian and Colombian schools. Ezekiel also penned poems in 'Indian English' like the one based on instruction boards in his favourite Irani café. His poems are used in NCERT and ICSE English textbooks. His poem 'Background, Casually' is considered to be the most defining poem of his poetic and personal career.

Nissim Ezekiel is often considered the father of Modern Indian English poetry by many critics.

He was honoured with the Padmashri award by the President of India in 1988 and the Sahitya Akademi cultural award in 1983.

== Editor ==
He was the founding editor of Quest in 1954.

== Death ==
After a prolonged battle with Alzheimer's disease, Nissim Ezekiel died in Mumbai, on 9 January 2004 (aged 79).

== Books by Ezekiel ==
- 1952: Time To Change
- 1953: Sixty poems
- 1956: The Discovery of India
- 1959: The Third
- 1960: The Unfinished Man
- 1965: The Exact Name
- 1974: Snakeskin and Other Poems, translations of the Marathi poet Indira Sant
- 1976: Hymns in Darkness
- 1982: Latter-Day Psalms
- 1989: Collected Poems 1952-88 OUP

== Plays ==
- 1969: The Three Plays Kolkata: Writers Workshop, India
- Do Not Call it Suicide Madras: Macmillan India, 1993.

== Prose ==
- Ezekiel, Nissim (1992). Selected prose. Oxford University Press. ISBN 978-0-19-562866-1. OCLC 624466913.
- Naipaul's India and mine- an essay

=== Editor ===
- 1965: An Emerson Readers
- 1969: A Joseph King Reader
- 1990: Another India, anthology of fiction and poetry

== Poems ==
- The Couple
- Urban
- Enterprise
- A Time to Change
- Philosophy
- Island
- For Elkana
- Soap
- Marriage
- In the country cottage
- How the english lessons ended
- The Paradise Flycatcher
- Night of The Scorpion
- The Professor
- Goodbye party for Miss Pushpa T.S.
- Entertainment (was the best of one)
- "Background, Casually"
- Poet, Lover and Birdwatcher

== Appearances in poetry anthologies ==
- The Golden Treasure of Writers Workshop Poetry (2008) ed. by Rubana Huq and published by Writers Workshop, Calcutta
- Ten Twentieth-Century Indian Poets (1976) ed. by R. Parthasarathy and published by Oxford University Press, New Delhi
- The Oxford India Anthology of Twelve Modern Indian Poets (1992) ed. by Arvind Krishna Mehrotra and published by Oxford University Press, New Delhi

== See also ==
- Indian poetry in English
- Indian English literature
- Indian literature
