= David R. Altman =

American advertising executive (1915–2000)

- Born: David R. Altman; July 10, 1915
- Died: August 30, 2000 (age 85)
- Education: J.D. New York University School of Law
- Occupation: Advertising executive
- Known for: co-founder of Altman, Stoller, Weiss
- Spouse: Floria V. Lasky
- Children: Emily Altman; Dara Altman Lennon
- Family: Melvin J. Lasky (brother-in-law)

David R. Altman (1915 – August 30, 2000) was an American advertising executive who co-founded the Altman, Stoller, Weiss advertising agency.

== Biography ==
Born to a Jewish family, Altman served as an Army weapons instructor during World War II. After the war, he attended New York University School of Law at night on the G.I. Bill. While in school, he worked during the day as the advertising director for the trade magazine, The Women's Reporter. Although he earned a Juris Doctor degree, he instead accepted a job as an account executive with the fashion house, Irving Serwer Advertising. In 1950, he founded Altman & Stoller with fellow Irving Serwer alumni Max Stoller where he served as chairman.

Altman focused on the fashion industry which was ripe for development as most clothing manufacturers typically pitched their concepts direct to the stores rather than develop the brand with the general public. Through his ad campaigns, Altman was credited with transforming then unknown fashion brands into household names. He developed the Wrangler jeans brand with ads that promised that the jeans would fade exactly how teenagers wanted them. He transitioned Monet jewelry from being perceived as low-cost to a premier brand by photographing inexpensive pieces on supermodels. He promoted the Russ Togs brand with a red neon sign that read RRRRRRRRRuss Toggs at the entrance to the Midtown Tunnel in Manhattan, elongating the name into a sexy purr. His creed was "Find your character; create your character; concentrate on your character."

In 1955, the firm became Altman, Stoller, and Chalk with the addition of Howard W. Chalk as a partner; Chalk left the company to start Chalk, Nissen, Hanft. The firm became Altman, Stoller, Weiss in the mid 1970s after Melvin D. Weiss joined the firm. The firm then diversified out of fashion advertising winning accounts with the Spanish tourist board, Ezo denture adhesive, and Lanson champagne, and handled the introduction of Newsweek's Inside Sports magazine. In 1978, he published an editorial in The New York Times that he was sickened by what television advertising had done to election campaigns which often promoted mediocre candidates stating "'A candidate is not a can of soup."

Altman, Stoller, Weiss was later purchased by Nadler & Larimer Advertising where it was maintained as a subsidiary before being fully absorbed and the name retired in 1983. Altman became an executive vice president at Nadler & Larimer.

== Personal life ==
He was married to Floria V. Lasky; they had two daughters, Emily Altman and Dara Altman Lennon.
