= Franz Borkenau =

Austrian writer (1900–1957)

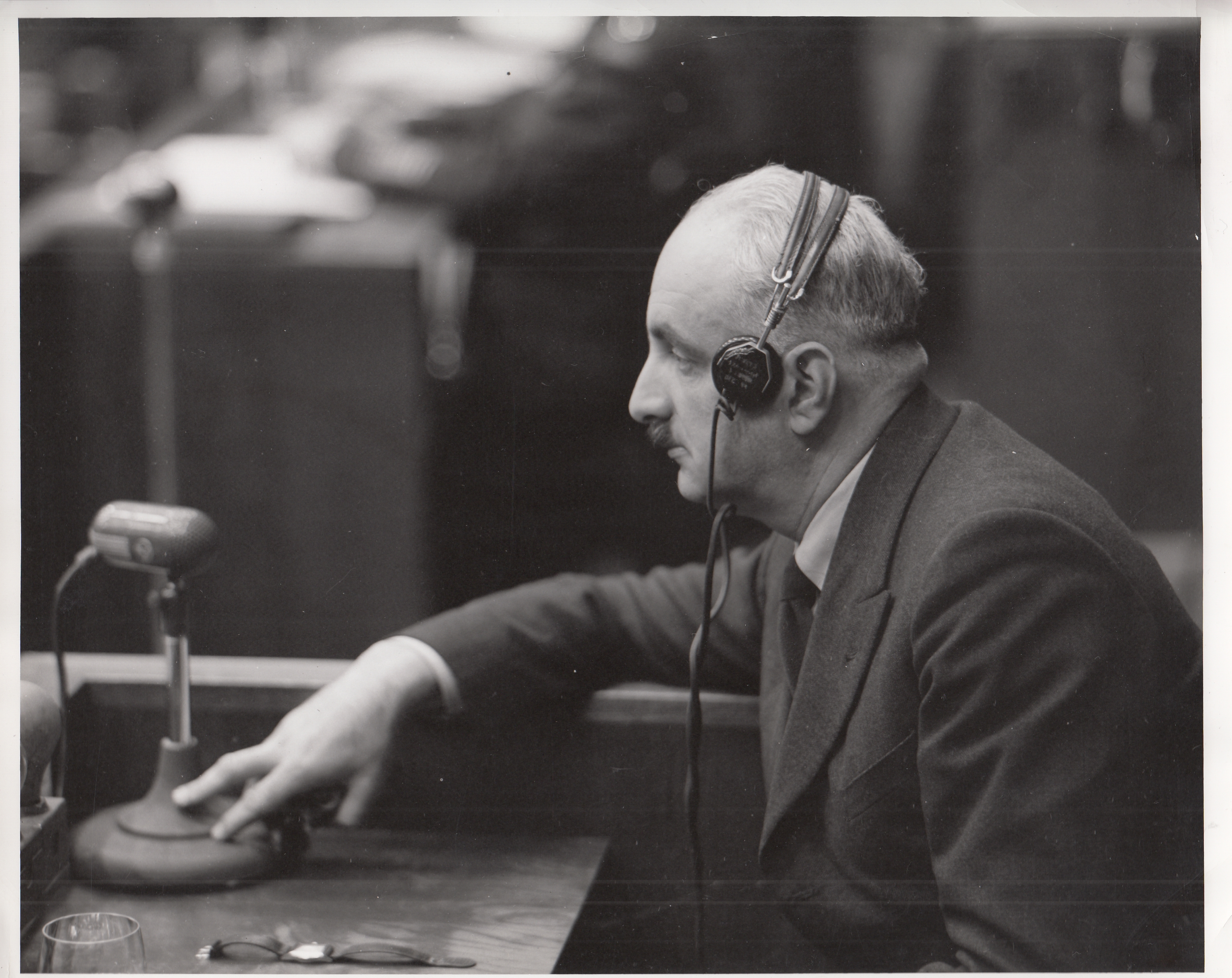
- Franz Borkenau as a witness in the Nuremberg Doctors' Trial in 1946
- Born: December 15, 1900; Vienna, Austria-Hungary
- Died: May 22, 1957 (aged 56); Zurich, Switzerland
- Occupations: Sociologist and journalist
- Known for: Pioneering of totalitarianism theory, The Spanish Cockpit

Franz Borkenau (December 15, 1900 – May 22, 1957) was an Austrian writer. Borkenau was born in Vienna, Austria, the son of a civil servant. As a university student in Leipzig, his main interests were Marxism and psychoanalysis. Borkenau is known as one of the pioneers of the totalitarianism theory.

== Youth ==
Borkenau was born in Vienna, the son of Judge Rudolf Pollack and Melanie Fürth. Borkenau's father was born Jewish, but had converted to Roman Catholicism to improve his career prospects while his mother was Protestant. Borkenau was raised as a Catholic. Vienna was the capital of the vast multicultural and multiethnic Austrian empire that covered much of Eastern Europe, and Borkenau grew up in a cosmopolitan city that was full of various peoples. As a teenager, he became part of an youth subculture that was greatly influenced by the theories of psychoanalysis as promoted by Sigmund Freud and Freud's protégé Siegfried Bernfeld. After graduating from the Schottengymnasium in 1918, Borkenau was conscripted into the Austrian army. Borkenau was still in training at the time that the Austrian empire was defeated and the ancient House of Habsburg was deposed in October 1918.

As a student at the University of Vienna, he studied the law, history, economics and philosophy. As a student, he became convinced that the cause of the war that ended the Austrian empire was capitalism, which led him to become active in Communist groups. Borkenau was typical of the Austrian middle class who had enjoyed what the novelist Stefan Zweig called the "golden age of security" before 1914 and found the world that came about after 1918 to be as disorientating as it was disturbing, leading to a search for a new "anchor" ideology to provide certainty in a dangerous and uncertain world. Both of his parents disavowed him for embracing Communism. As a university student, he rose up to become chairman of the German Communist Students' League. Borkenau ended up transferring over to the University of Leipzig, where he was awarded a PhD in 1924. Borkenau's PhD thesis was on the Universal History, an 18th-century British universal history. Borkenau was always interested in devising grand theories that could explain everything that had happened in history, and believed that he had found such a theory in Marxism.

== Communist ==
In 1921, Borkenau joined the Communist Party of Germany (KPD) and was active as a Comintern agent until 1929. After graduating from the University of Leipzig in 1924, Borkenau moved to Berlin. From 1925 to 1929, Borkenau worked as a research assistant for Jürgen Kuczynski at the Forschungsstelle für internationale Politik in Berlin, a think-tank that was sponsored by the German Communist Party. Both Borkenau and Kuczynski worked for the Hungarian Communist Eugen Varga, whose office at the Soviet embassy in Berlin was a conduit for the Comintern. In the 1920s, Borkenau was described by his friend Richard Löwenthal as a "sincere Marxist" who very much wanted a world revolution. Like other Marxists in Germany, Borkenau was disturbed by the failure as he saw it of the November Revolution of 1918, which had toppled the monarchy, but failed to replace capitalism with socialism. A major interest for Borkenau was in discovering the reasons why the November Revolution had failed to develop along Marxist lines, which led him to become involved in the Frankfurt School. At the end of 1929, Borkenau was expelled from both the Comintern and the KPD, owing to his personal repulsion and disgust about how the Communists operated, combined with an increasing horror about Stalinism. Borkenau then joined the Social Democratic Party of Germany, which he remained a member of until 1931 when he resigned.

In 1930, he began work on his Habilitationsschrift, a book entitled Der Übergang vom feudalen zum bürgerlichen Weltbild (The Transition from the Feudal to Bourgeois Interpretation of the World). Focusing on 17th-century Europe, Borkenau argued against the claims of Wilhelm Dilthey who maintained that the emergence of modern Geisteswissenschaften (the humanities) as university subjects was a process of transcending feudal ways of viewing the world. Taking a materialist line, Borkenau sought to link intellectual trends with the level of economic growth as he argued that no philosophy could be ahead of the levels of productive forces in a society.

== In exile ==
Despite his disillusionment with Communism, Borkenau remained a leftist and worked as a researcher for the University of Frankfurt Institute for Social Research. During his time at the institute, Borkenau was a protégé of Carl Grünberg and his main interest was the relationship between capitalism and ideology. During 1933, Borkenau, who in Nazi terms was a "half-Jew", fled from Germany and lived at various times in Vienna, Paris and Panama City.

During the Austrian Civil War of 1934, Borkenau supported the Social Democratic Republikanischer Schutzbund against the government of Chancellor Engelbert Dollfuss. Borkenau tried to organise socialist resistance against the Dollfuss regime, but upon learning he was wanted by the Austrian police, fled to Paris. From 1934 to 1935, Borkenau lived in Paris, where he unsuccessfully sought an academic position. During the 1930s, Borkenau was involved with organizing aid from abroad for the clandestine group Neu Beginnen (New Beginnings), which was working for the end of the Nazi regime. In a series of articles published during 1933–34 in the left-wing German language émigré press, Borkenau defended the Neu Beginnen group as the superior alternative to both the Social Democratic Party of Germany and the Communist Party of Germany.

In 1935, he moved to London, where he befriended Bronisław Malinowski and unsuccessfully sought a position at the London School of Economics. The only academic post he was able to obtain was as a professor of sociology at the University of Panama. The pay was low, being only US$100 per month, and the tropical climate of Panama had a disastrous impact on Borkenau's health. In 1936, Borkenau moved back to London, where he worked as a journalist for a number of left-wing and liberal British newspapers.

In his 1936 biography of the Italian sociologist Vilfredo Pareto, Borkenau offered an early theory of totalitarianism from a Marxist perspective. Though rather hostile towards Pareto, Borkenau was much impressed by his theory of the "circulation of elites", by which the ablest individuals naturally became members of the elite, thereby ensuring that the elites would always be re-energized and refreshed. Writing from a Marxist viewpoint, Borkenau contended that the "circulation of elites" theory explained both Communism and fascism. Borkenau argued that the political, social and economic crises caused by World War I caused the strongest capitalists to form a "new economic elite". However, as the "new economic elite" continually revitalized itself by ever more destructive competition, more and more ordinary people felt the effects, thus causing the state to intervene. As the state became more involved with the economy, a "new political elite" emerged, which superseded the previous economic elite, and claimed total power for itself in both the economy and politics. In Borkenau's opinion, Fascism in Italy, National Socialism in Germany and Communism in Russia, all in different ways, represented the unfolding of the process. Borkenau argued that Vladimir Lenin created the first totalitarian dictatorship with all power concentrated into the hands of the state, which was completely unconstrained by any class forces as all previous regimes had been.

== Spanish Civil War ==
In August–September 1936, Borkenau made a two-month visit to Spain, where he observed the effects of Spanish Civil War in Madrid, Barcelona and Valencia. During his Spanish visit, Borkenau was much disillusioned by the behavior of the agents of the Soviet secret police, the NKVD in Spain and of the Spanish Communist Party.

During his first visit to Spain, Borkenau set out to dispute the picture of Spanish Republican women offered up by the British journalist Ferdinand Touchy, who wrote a photo-essay on 27 July 1936 in the conservative Daily Mail newspaper called "The Red Carmens, the women who burn churches". Touchy's essay featured a series of photos he had taken of Spanish women who had joined the Worker's Militia, and argued that for women to fight in the war was to reject their femininity, which for him was a most monstrous development. Touchy condemned the Spanish republic as amoral and "Godless". In an essay that has been widely condemned as misogynistic, Touchy argued that the right and proper role of a Spanish woman was to be a submissive housewife, devoted to obeying the Catholic church and her husband, and argued that the Spanish Republic deserved to lose the war because it preached gender equality. Touchy argued that the women serving in the Worker's Militia had engaged in all sorts of sexual "depravity", writing of his disgust about young women who engaged in premarital sex with both men and other women, which for him was the beginning of the end of "civilization" itself. Borkenau wrote a response to Touchy's article, which he called full of hysteria and inaccuracies, saying he had not seen the widespread "sexual depravity" that Touchy claimed to have witnessed. Borkenau wrote against Touchy that women serving in the Worker's Militia did not seem to be causing the sort of social breakdown that Touchy claimed it had, saying the society was being strained by the war, but it was holding up to the challenge. Borkenau further wrote that wars break down the traditional barriers of sexual morality, and noted that based on his own personal experiences of the Austrian empire in World War I that the sort of "sexual depravity" that Touchy claimed to have seen in Spain had been common in Vienna during World War I.

During January 1937, Borkenau made a second visit to Spain, during which he was arrested by Spanish police for his criticism of Communist Party policy. Borkenau's experience inspired his best-known book, The Spanish Cockpit (1937), which was widely praised and "made Borkenau's name famous throughout the English-speaking world". Reviewer Douglas Goldring praised The Spanish Cockpit as "of exceptional interest to all those who are really anxious to know what is going on in Spain". George Orwell was among those with experience with the Spanish Civil War and with the sometimes viciousness of leftist politics who was greatly impressed with Borkenau's Spanish Cockpit. Orwell sought Borkenau and became a friend. Noam Chomsky would later describe The Spanish Cockpit as "an illuminating eyewitness account" of the war.

In The Spanish Cockpit, Borkenau made clear his sympathy for the Spanish Republic while at the same time being critical how the Republic was fighting the civil war. In particular, Borkenau made an issue of the Soviet treatment of Manfred Stern who under the alias of General Emilio Kléber had emerged as the most able of the officers leading the International Brigades fighting for the republic. Stern had been recalled to the Soviet Union and disappeared, a victim of the Yezhovshchina ("the Yezhov times"). Stern was posing as a Canadian, but in fact had been born in the Austrian province of Bukovina (modern western Moldova and northeastern Romania). Borkenau and Stern had been classmates at the University of Vienna, and Borkenau was one of the few journalists who actually knew the real identity of "Emilio Kléber". Based on his own knowledge, Borkenau felt that the claim that the Jewish Stern was a spy for Nazi Germany was absurd.

Borkenau described the Spanish civil war as an aborted revolution, writing that in every revolution it was always the most organised faction that gained the ascendency, leading him to conclude:

The transformation was cut short in France by the fall of Robespierre, not before having made considerable process. It came to full strength in Russia in the years after the end of the civil war. In Spain, where the properly revolutionary processes have been so quickly superseded by something entirely different, it has made great strides since the beginning of the civil war.... It is not only violence, which is the midwife of every society is heavy with child. And if violence is the father of every great upheaval, its mother is illusion. The belief which is always reborn in every great and decisive struggle is, that this will be the last fight, that after this struggle all poverty, all suffering, all oppression will be things of the past. In a religious form, this was the belief of the millennium. In a secular form, it is the belief in a society free of domination.

Borkenau argued that the Spanish anarchists were too democratic and too disorganised for their own good as he argued the more disciplined and better-organised Spanish Communists had the advantage. Borkenau argued that the problem with the Spanish Republican Army was the politics of the Spanish Republic, writing:

In the first place it might have aimed at creating a revolutionary army. This was the policy favored by the Anarchists and the revolutionary Socialists. In the second place, there was the option of creating a totalitarian army after the model of the present German, Italian and Russian armies. This was the policy of the Communists. In the third place, there was the possibility of creating a 'normal' non-political army. This was the policy of [Indalecio] Prieto's moderate Socialists and [Manuel] Azaña's Liberal Republicans.

Borkenau felt that the main strength of the Spanish Republic, its dependence upon economic and military support from the Soviet Union, was also its main weakness. Borkenau wrote:

As it was, and as it had to be, because the failure of the Spanish Left coincided with the fascist intervention, republican Spain was at the mercy of the force which had brought help.... For it was a force with a revolutionary past, not a revolutionary present, which had come to help the Spaniards. The Communists put an end to revolutionary social activity, and enforced their view that this ought not to be a revolution, but simply the defense of the legal government.

== Anti-Nazi writings ==
Borkenau's book Austria and After (1938) was an attack on the Nazi Anschluss. In the introduction to Austria and After, Borkenau wrote that he regarded himself as did almost all Austrians of his generation as:

... belonging to a larger German fatherland, rather than a narrower community of Germans in Austria, that I was a partisan of the Anschluss since I had any political convictions whatsoever, that I regarded the artificial severance of Austria from Germany as laid down by the peace treaties as the chief source of the miseries, both material and spiritual in my country. Now, these dreams of my youth have come true. They mean suicide for hundreds, untold misery for hundreds of thousands, exile for many who wished for this day to come just as I did.

After the Anschluss, the Nazi regime refused to make Borkenau a German citizen, thus rendering him stateless, a legal status he retained for the rest of his life.

In Austria and After, Borkenau argued that the Republic of Austria, which represented the rump of the once vast Austrian empire, was destroyed by a conflict between Socialism and Catholicism. In his opinion, the downfall of the House of Habsburg together with post-war inflation had destroyed the power of the landed Austrian aristocracy who dominated the Austrian empire both economically and politically up until 1918, leaving the Socialists and the Catholic Church as the only two remaining powers in the new Republic of Austria. Borkenau wrote that the main dividing line in Austrian politics was the division between the urban areas of Austria, especially Vienna, that voted for the Austrian Social Democratic Party, and the rural areas of Austria that favored a conservative Catholicism. Borkenau wrote: "It is doubtful whatever the clergy, who had defended the War to the end, would have easily kept the alliance of the peasants after it, had there not existed the socialist bogy". Borkenau argued that support of the trade unions had ensured that the Austrian working class voted solidly for the Social Democrats, who came to dominate Vienna so much that it was popularly known as "Red Vienna".

Borkenau argued the uneasy coalition between Socialism and Catholicism in Austria broke down on 15 July 1927, a day that saw a series of violent clashes between the working class and the Vienna police force, and between the Republikanischer Schutzbund, the paramilitary wing of the Social Democrats and the fascist Heimwehr militia, leaving about 90 people dead. Borkenau wrote that after the clashes of 15 July 1927, Austrian politics were in a state of latent civil war as there was no possibility of co-operation again. Borkenau concluded that the victory of the conservatives in the 1934 civil war was ironically the source of their downfall. With the Austrian Social Democratic Party destroyed as a political force, Borkenau argued that the right-wing farmers no longer lived in dread of the Socialists, which caused them to shift their support to the Austrian Nazis who promised an Anschluss with Germany. As Germany had the largest economy in Europe and the second-largest economy in the world (outranked only by the American economy), for Austrian farmers hit hard by the Great Depression the possibility of an Anschluss promised to solve their economic problems. Deprived of its base of support, Borkenau argued that the Austrian government promptly collapsed in 1938 when Hitler demanded an Anschluss.

In 1939, Borkenau published The New German Empire, where he warned that Adolf Hitler was intent upon world conquest. In particular, Borkenau advised against the idea, popular in Britain in the 1930s, that the British government should return former German colonies in Africa in exchange for a German promise to respect the borders of Europe (unknown to Borkenau, such an offer had been secretly made to the Germans in early 1938, which they rejected).

Borkenau argued that the Germans would never honour such a promise, returning the former German colonies would only provide a new field of conflict, and Hitler's determination to overthrow the Treaty of Versailles was "an almost insignificant incident on the road to unlimited expansion". Borkenau claimed that the German propaganda campaign for the former African colonies was a "stepping stone to something else", the "acquisition of a wider colonial area" for Germany. He asserted that the propaganda campaign for the return of the former German colonies in Africa was intended for their strategic value in helping to prepare the ground for a war against Britain and France, rather than the economic value, which Borkenau noted was very small. Borkenau argued that the main German target in Africa was South Africa. Borkenau contended that if Britain returned the former German colonies to the Reich, the Germans would arouse the anti-British elements within the Afrikaner population. Once the anti-British Afrikaners became the politically dominant element "to the exclusion of everything British", the Germans would transform South Africa into a German protectorate. With control of South Africa, the Germans would be able to control the Cape of Good Hope route to India and the gold mines of the Witwatersrand, which "would at one stroke get rid of all the limitations imposed on her Germany by the lack of free exchange".

According to Borkenau, the dictatorship was a powerful revolutionary mass dictatorship based on propaganda and terror, which, to maintain itself and the associated Wehrwirtschaft (Defence Economy), required a policy of endless expansion in all directions. The powerful internal forces driving German foreign policy meant Nazi Germany had to attempt world conquest because without expansionism in all directions, the German dictatorship would collapse. The nearest historical counterpart to German policy was French expansionism during the French Revolution and the age of Napoleon I. Borkenau criticized those who compared Nazi Germany to the German Empire or argued that National Socialism was just one of the "ever-recurring waves of Teutonic nationalism or the expression of "have-not imperialism" as engaging in a "deadly parallel". Borkenau began his book with the question:

The problem, and a very important one at that, is whatever Germany is simply carrying out well-thought plans or is driven into limitless adventures by developments over which she herself is not the master. In the one case, we must still reckon with some rational plan on the part of Germany which it would be important to discover. In the second case, we faced an outburst of incalculable instincts which cannot but end in disaster, both for Germany and others

Borkenau argued that the Nazi regime was revolutionary, but not in a way that conformed to popular ideas of "current revolutions" because with the exception of the German Jews, the Nazi regime had "respected property rights". Instead, he argued that the Nazi revolution was one of metaphysics, as the German people "reacted to the complete disintegration of all existing values with an outcry for a new faith and a new savior", making the Machtergreifung into a revolution because henceforward all that mattered in Germany was "belief in the Führer and unlimited faith in him" leading to a situation where "All the political forces of the past have been wiped out".

Borkenau argued against the popular idea in Britain that the Nazi regime would eventually settle down into a type of "normalcy" as a profound misreading of the Third Reich. In this regard, Borkenau rejected the very popular theory in Britain that the Nazi regime was simply an extreme, if understandable reaction to the Treaty of Versailles, which would "settle down" once the international order created by the Treaty of Versailles was revised in the favor of the Reich. Borkenau argued that the Nazi regime was driven by relentless dynamism, which even Hitler did not fully control, as he argued that the Nazi regime was not so much a one-party state as a new religion consumed in a "quasi-mystical fanaticism". In Borkenau's reading, the Nazi ideology was fundamentally negative, as the regime defined itself more in terms of what it was against rather than what it was for, thus requiring a policy of endless aggression. Borkenau wrote that "the complete disintegration of the old economic structures and the old spiritual values in Germany" made the National Socialist regime sui generis. Borkenau concluded:

Here Nazi tactics are indissolubly linked with the basis of the movement itself. A prophet carrying a supernatural message, needs only to prove his prophetic quality by signs and symbols. But a prophet aiming to prove himself a Messiah and to bring immediate salvation to this world must make his earthly career a constant sequence of miraculous successes. And as this world is, this cannot be achieved by the means of a straight fight against straight adversaries.

In a book aimed at British readers, Borkenau maintained that this need to constantly validate itself by victories would ensure that appeasement would fail as the Nazi regime did not play by the rules of traditional diplomacy, but instead "all practical aims are subordinate to the supernatural urge". In an attack on the foreign policy of Prime Minister Neville Chamberlain, Borkenau wrote: "Before Hitler marched into Prague, a tendency prevailed to interpret German aims in the context of German official declarations ... an impression prevailed that Hitler's speeches had something to do with his intentions".

Borkenau's portrayal of Nazi foreign policy as driven by powerful internal forces into a limitless expansionism prefigured the arguments made by functionalist historians like Hans Mommsen and Martin Broszat, who similarly contended that Nazi foreign policy did not have any plans but was rather "expansionism without objective" pushed by internal forces. However, Borkenau's work differed from the functionalists in that he maintained that the Nazi regime was a well-organized totalitarian dictatorship. In 1939, Borkenau wrote: "There is little doubt that within a few years the fate of the Jews in eastern Europe will resemble that of the Armenians in Turkey".

== World War Two ==
During World War II, Borkenau lived in London, and worked as a writer for Cyril Connolly's journal Horizon. In 1940, Borkenau was interned by the British government as an "enemy alien" and deported to an internment camp in Australia. In 1941, he was released and returned to London, where he worked as a lecturer at London University until April 1943. In 1942, he published a book Socialism—National or International?, where he took up the question of what the world should be like after the hoped-for Allied victory. Borkenau concluded that the wartime expansion of the powers of the state would mean some sort of socialism was the solution to the world's problems, writing that "a planned economy, if once established, should never abolish individual means of ownership". He argued that reconstruction of the world economy was not compatible "with a programme of class struggle", leading him to write that the best party to lead Britain after the war ended was the Labour Party. Borkenau rejected Communism, and instead urged an alliance of the Labour Party with the left wing of the Democratic Party in the United States. For Britain, Borkenau urged a gradualist transition from capitalism to socialism, writing that "precisely through the gradual growth of state intervention" as preached by the Labour Party was the best way forward. Borkenau condemned Communism, writing: "How dare I soil the name of socialism by associating it with a dirty piece of trickery such as Soviet Russia?" Borkenau wrote that Communist internationalism was only a vehicle for Soviet imperialism, while "Labour internationalism would be embodied in mutual help". In April 1943, he left London University to start work as speaker of the BBC's German language broadcasts, delivering anti-Nazi speeches that appealed to the German people to overthrow the Nazi regime. In 1944, he started to work for the United States Office of War Information as an expert on Germany and Austria.

== Cold War ==
In 1947, Borkenau returned to Germany to work as a professor at the University of Marburg. In June 1950, Borkenau attended the conference in Berlin together with other anti-Communist intellectuals such as Hugh Trevor-Roper, Ignazio Silone, Raymond Aron, Arthur Koestler, Sidney Hook and Melvin J. Lasky that resulted in the initiation of the Congress for Cultural Freedom. At the conference, Borkenau delivered the theme speech, for which he spoke of the "meaninglessness" of the conflict between capitalism and socialism in a time of "ebbing revolution", and the only conflict that mattered in the world was the one between Communism and democracy. Left-wing intellectuals such as Cedric Belfrage, noting that Hitler often denounced Communism in Berlin, like Borkenau did, would compare his speech to the Nuremberg rallies and accused Borkenau of being a sort of neo-Nazi. The British historian Hugh Trevor-Roper, in a July 1950 letter to his friend, the American art dealer Bernard Berenson, wrote: "I haven't been abroad except for four days in Berlin for a so-called Kongress für Kulturelle Freheit where I misbehaved.... Aided by my English colleague A. J. Ayer, I led a resistance movement against the organisers of the Congress, which in fact was a totally illiberal organisation dominated by professional ex-Communist boulevardiers like Arthur Koestler and Franz Borkenau, confident in the support of the German ex-Nazis in the audience". Ayer and Trevor-Roper fundamentally differed with Borkenau and Koestler over the purpose of the Congress for Cultural Freedom. Ayer and Trevor-Roper saw the purpose of the Congress in upholding broadly liberal values such as freedom of expression and freedom of thought while Borkenau and Koestler saw the purpose of the Congress more as an anti-communist organisation. Thus, Ayer and Trevor-Roper objected to several elements of the draft declaration of the Congress that declared that followers of any "totalitarian" ideology "who deny spiritual freedom to others do not enjoy the right to citizenship in the free republic of the spirit", feeling this was an attempt to bring McCarthyism into the world of European intellectuals.

Borkenau was very active in the Congress, and was often criticized by Marxist intellectuals such as Isaac Deutscher for his anti-Communism. In turn, Borkenau was often critical of Deutscher's work. In 1949, Borkenau, in a newspaper article, criticized Deutscher for endorsing in his biography of Joseph Stalin the official Soviet version that Marshal Mikhail Tukhachevsky together with the rest of the Red Army high command had been plotting a coup in collaboration with the intelligence services of Germany and Japan, thus justifying Stalin's "liquidation" of the Red Army leadership in 1937. Borkenau claimed that Deutscher was engaging in an apologia for Stalin since, in his opinion, there was nothing that supported Stalin's version of events about the alleged coup plot of 1937. Borkenau concluded that:

Deutscher's perspective is utterly false.... Napoleon's person could be detached from the destinies of France; and the achievements of the revolution, and of the Napoleonic period were indeed preserved. But it is more than doubtful whether Russia's destiny can be separated from Stalinism, even if Stalin were ever to die a natural death. The inner law of Stalinist terror drives Stalin's Russia, not less, even if more slowly, the law of Nazi terror Hitler's Germany, to conflict with the world and thereby to total catastrophe not only for the terroristic régime, but also for the nation ruled by it.... The danger of Deutscher's book is that in place of this grave and anxious prospect it puts another one which is more normal and reassuring. According to Deutscher's conception there is nothing terrible to fear because in the main the terrors are already past. To this conception we oppose the opinion that the revolution of the twentieth century shows parallels to earlier revolutions only in its opening phase, but that later it ushers in a régime of terror without end, of hostility towards everything human, of horrors which carry no remedy, and which can be cured only ferro et igni.

Likewise, Borkenau was often critical of the work of the pro-Soviet British historian E. H. Carr. In 1951, Borkenau wrote in the Der Monat newspaper of the first volume of Carr's History of Soviet Russia that for Carr: "Human suffering he seems to say, is not a historical factor; Carr belongs to those very cold people who always believe they think and act with the iciest calculation and therefore fail to understand why they are mistaken in their calculations time and time again". Borkenau was a major advocate for the totalitarianism school. Another historian whom Borkenau disliked (for different reasons than was the case with Deutscher and Carr) was Arnold J. Toynbee. In the May 1955 issue of Commentary, Borkenau accused Toynbee of being anti-Semitic.

== Kremlinologist ==
In the 1950s, Borkenau was well known as an expert on Communism and the Soviet Union. Borkenau was one of the founders of Sovietology. As a Kremlinologist, one of Borkenau's major interests was making predictions about the future of Communism. Some of Borkenau's predictions, such as his claim during the early 1950s about the coming Sino-Soviet split would come true, but others would not. In an article in the April 1954 edition of Commentary entitled "Getting at the Facts Behind the Soviet Facade", Borkenau wrote that the Sino-Soviet alliance was unstable and would last for only a decade or so. Borkenau argued that despite the appearance of unity, there were power struggles within the Soviet elite. Moreover, Borkenau contended that within the Soviet government there were vast chefstvo (patronage) networks extending down from the elite to the lowest ranks of power.

Borkenau's techniques were a minute analysis of official Soviet statements and the relative placement of various officials at the Kremlin on festive occasions to determine which Soviet official enjoyed Stalin's favour and which official did not. Signs such as newspaper editorials, guest lists at formal occasions, obituaries in Soviet newspapers, and accounts of formal speeches were important to identifying the various chefstvo networks. Borkenau argued that even small changes in the formalistic language of the Soviet state could sometimes indicate important changes: "Political issues must be interpreted in the light of formulas, political and otherwise, and their history; and such interpretation cannot be safely concluded until the whole history of the given formula has been established from its first enunciation on." On the basis of his method, in January 1953, Borkenau predicted that Stalin's death would occur in the near-future (Stalin died later in March). In 1954, Borkenau wrote that he made that prediction on the basis of a resolution of the Socialist Unity Party of Germany on the "lessons of the Slansky case". Borkenau argued that because the resolution quoted Georgy Malenkov a number of times about the supposed lessons for the Communist world of Rudolf Slánský's supposed treason, it was Walter Ulbricht's way of associating himself with Malenkov's chefstvo network as part of the preparation for the post-Stalin succession struggle:

Malenkov was quoted at inordinate length.... By quoting him in his fashion and by adding his own yelp to the anti-Semitic chorus, Ulbricht, the animator of the resolution, proclaimed himself a Malenkov client. But even more important; while Malenkov was cited at length, Stalin was quoted with a mere half-sentence dating from 1910. Such a deliberate affront could have been offered only by people sure of that tyrant's approaching downfall, or else out of reach of his retribution. Otherwise, it was sure suicide. It was primarily on the strength of the evidence found in this resolution that I then predicted, in print, Stalin's imminent death, which, sure enough, came seven weeks later.

Borkenau's 1954 book, Der russische Bürgerkrieg, 1918–1921, showed some sympathy for non-Bolshevik socialists.

== End and Beginning ==
Another topic of interest for Borkenau was engaging in an intellectual critique of Toynbee and Oswald Spengler's work about when and why civilizations weaken and end. The latter critique was published posthumously by his friend, Richard Löwenthal. In his book, Borkenau drew a distinction between the "Latin" mentality of southern Europe (which also included France) and the "Germanic" mentality of northern Europe. Borkenau argued that German literature tended to celebrate individual "superman" heroes who achieved superhuman feats in battle while French literature did not. Borkenau used as an example the French epic poem Chanson de Roland, where the hero Roland, against the advice of his best friend Oliver, chooses not ask for the readily available help of Charlemagne's army against a Muslim army invading from the Iberian Peninsula. Borkenau noted that the result of Roland's vainglorious desire is his own death and the destruction of his own army, which was very different from how medieval German poets would have handled the story.

Borkenau became increasingly active as a freelance author living in Paris, Rome and Zurich, where he died suddenly of heart failure in 1957.

== Work ==
- The Transition from the Feudal to the Bourgeois World View, 1934.
- Pareto, New York: Wiley, 1936.
- The Spanish Cockpit: An Eye-Witness Account of the Political and Social Conflicts of the Spanish Civil War, London: Faber and Faber, 1937.
- Austria and After, London, Faber and Faber 1938.
- The Communist International, London: Faber and Faber, 1938.
- The New German Empire, New York, Viking, 1939.
- The Totalitarian Enemy, London, Faber and Faber 1940.
- Socialism, National or International. London: G. Routledge. 1942 – via Internet Archive.
- European Communism, New York: Harper, 1953.
- World Communism; A History of the Communist International, Ann Arbor: University of Michigan Press 1962.
- End and Beginning: On the Generations of Cultures and the Origins of the West, edited with an introduction by Richard Lowenthal, New York: Columbia University Press, 1981.

== See also ==
- Freudo-Marxism
