= Frances Stonor Saunders =

British historian (1966–2026)

- Born: Frances Hélène Jeanne Stonor Saunders; 14 April 1966; Windsor, Berkshire, England
- Died: 31 August 2026 (aged 60); Chichester, West Sussex, England
- Education: St Anne's College, Oxford
- Occupations: Journalist and historian
- Notable work: Who Paid the Piper?: CIA and the Cultural Cold War (1999)
- Awards: William Gladstone Memorial Prize

Frances Hélène Jeanne Stonor Saunders FRSL (14 April 1966 – 31 August 2026) was a British journalist and historian. She was known for writing Who Paid the Piper?: CIA and the Cultural Cold War (1999), which exposed secret CIA attempts to manipulate public opinion.

== Early life and education ==
Frances Stonor Saunders was born in Windsor, Berkshire, on 14 April 1966, the daughter of Julia Camoys Stonor and Donald Robin Slomnicki Saunders. Her father, who died in 1997, was a Jewish refugee from Bucharest, Romania, born to a British national with Polish and Russian ancestry. Jews named Slomnicki died in the Belzec extermination camp; the fate of two great-aunts Saunders was unable to determine. Her parents divorced when Saunders was eight.

Saunders attended St Mary's School Ascot, where she was head girl.

== Career ==
A few years after graduating (in 1987) with a first-class honours degree in English from University of Oxford (having studied at St Anne's College), Saunders embarked on a career as a television film-maker. Hidden Hands: A Different History of Modernism, made for Channel 4 in 1995, discussed the connection linking American art critics and Abstract Expressionist painters with the CIA. Who Paid the Piper?: CIA and the Cultural Cold War (1999) (in the USA: The Cultural Cold War: The CIA and the World of Arts and Letters), her first book, was developed from her work on the documentary, concentrating on the history of the covertly CIA-funded Congress for Cultural Freedom. The book won the Royal Historical Society's William Gladstone Memorial Prize and was shortlisted for the Guardian First Book Award. It has since been published in fifteen languages. Saunders's other works reflect her academic background as a medievalist.

In 2005, after some years as the arts editor and associate editor of the New Statesman, Saunders resigned in protest over the sacking of Peter Wilby, the then-editor. In 2004 and 2005 for Radio 3, she presented Meetings of Minds, two three-part series on the meetings of intellectuals at significant points in history. She was a regular contributor to Radio 3's Nightwaves and other radio programmes.

Her second book, Hawkwood: Diabolical Englishman (in the US: The Devil's Broker), recounts the life and career of John Hawkwood, a condottiere of the 14th century. English-born, Hawkwood (1320–1394) made a notorious career as a participant in the confused and treacherous power politics of the Papacy, France, and Italy. The Woman Who Shot Mussolini (2010) is a biography of Violet Gibson, the Anglo-Irish aristocrat who shot Benito Mussolini in 1926, wounding him slightly.

Of Saunders's book, The Suitcase: Six Attempts to Cross a Border, Elisa Segrave wrote in The Spectator: "This is a complex, occasionally frustrating book with fascinating historical nuggets." The author "certainly brings home the anguish of war. She also examines memory, its importance and its unpredictability." James McConnachie wrote in The Sunday Times: "As for that suitcase, it would be unfair to say more. I'll only warn that the payoff isn't a Hollywood explosion. It is more an arthouse twist — but one that, like this book, will haunt you." Saunders was awarded the PEN Ackerley Prize for outstanding memoir and autobiography for The Suitcase: Six Attempts to Cross a Border in July 2022.

Saunders was elected as a Fellow of the Royal Society of Literature in 2018. She lived in London.

== Death ==
Saunders died of glioblastoma in Chichester, England, on 31 August 2026, aged 60.

== Works ==
=== Articles ===
- "Modern art was CIA 'weapon'". The Independent (14 June 2013) (orig. 22 October 1995).
- "The Writer and the Valet." London Review of Books, vol. 36, no. 18 (25 September 2014).
- "Stuck on the Flypaper: Frances Stonor Saunders on MI5 and the Hobsbawm File." London Review of Books, vol. 37, no. 7 (9 April 2015).
- "Where on Earth Are You?" London Review of Books, vol. 38, no. 5 (3 March 2016).
- "The Suitcase." London Review of Books, vol. 42, no. 15 (30 July 2020).
- "The Suitcase: Part Two." London Review of Books, vol. 42, no. 16 (3 August 2020).
- "The Suitcase: Part Three." London Review of Books, vol. 42, no. 17 (10 September 2020).

=== Books ===
- Who Paid the Piper?: CIA and the Cultural Cold War. London: Granta (1999). ISBN 1862070296.
  - U.S. ed.: The Cultural Cold War: The CIA and the World of Arts and Letters. New York: The New Press (2000). ISBN 978-1595589149.
- Hawkwood: Diabolical Englishman. London: Faber and Faber (2004). ISBN 057121908X.
  - U.S. ed.: The Devil's Broker: Seeking Gold, God, and Glory in Fourteenth-Century Italy. New York: Fourth Estate (2005). ISBN 006077729X.
- The Woman Who Shot Mussolini. London: Faber and Faber (2010). ISBN 978-0571239771.

=== Documentaries ===
- Hidden Hands: A Hidden History of Modernism. London: Channel 4 (1995). 4 episodes.
  - Incl. 32-page booklet. ISBN 978-1851441457.
