= Double florin =

British coin, struck 1887–1890

- United Kingdom
- Value: £0.2
- Mass: 22.6 g
- Diameter: 36 mm
- Edge: Milled
- Composition: 92.5% silver
- Silver: 0.6727 troy oz
- Years of minting: 1887–1890
- Catalog number: KM 763

Obverse
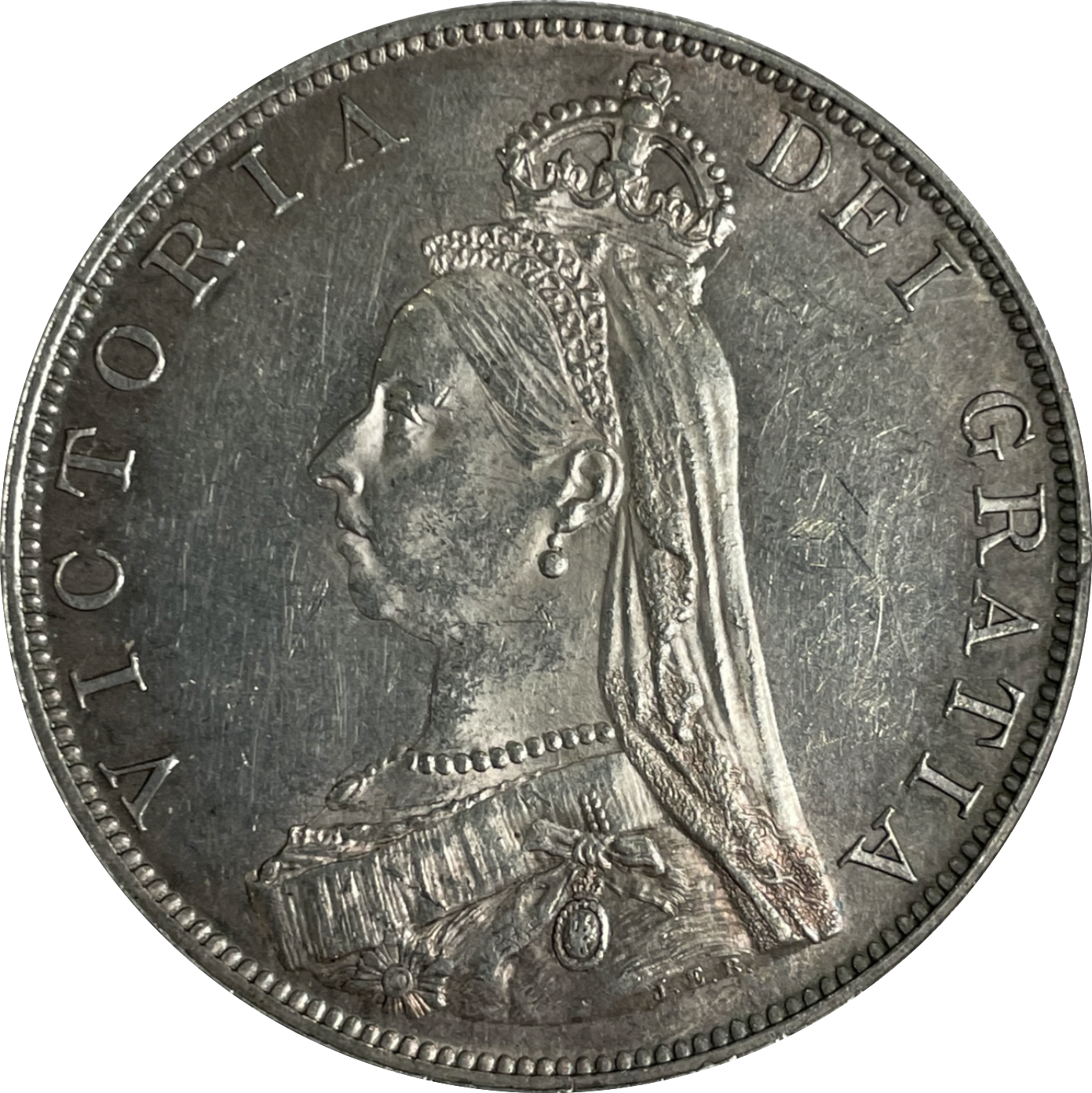
- Design: Profile of Queen Victoria
- Designer: Joseph Boehm
- Design date: 1887

Reverse
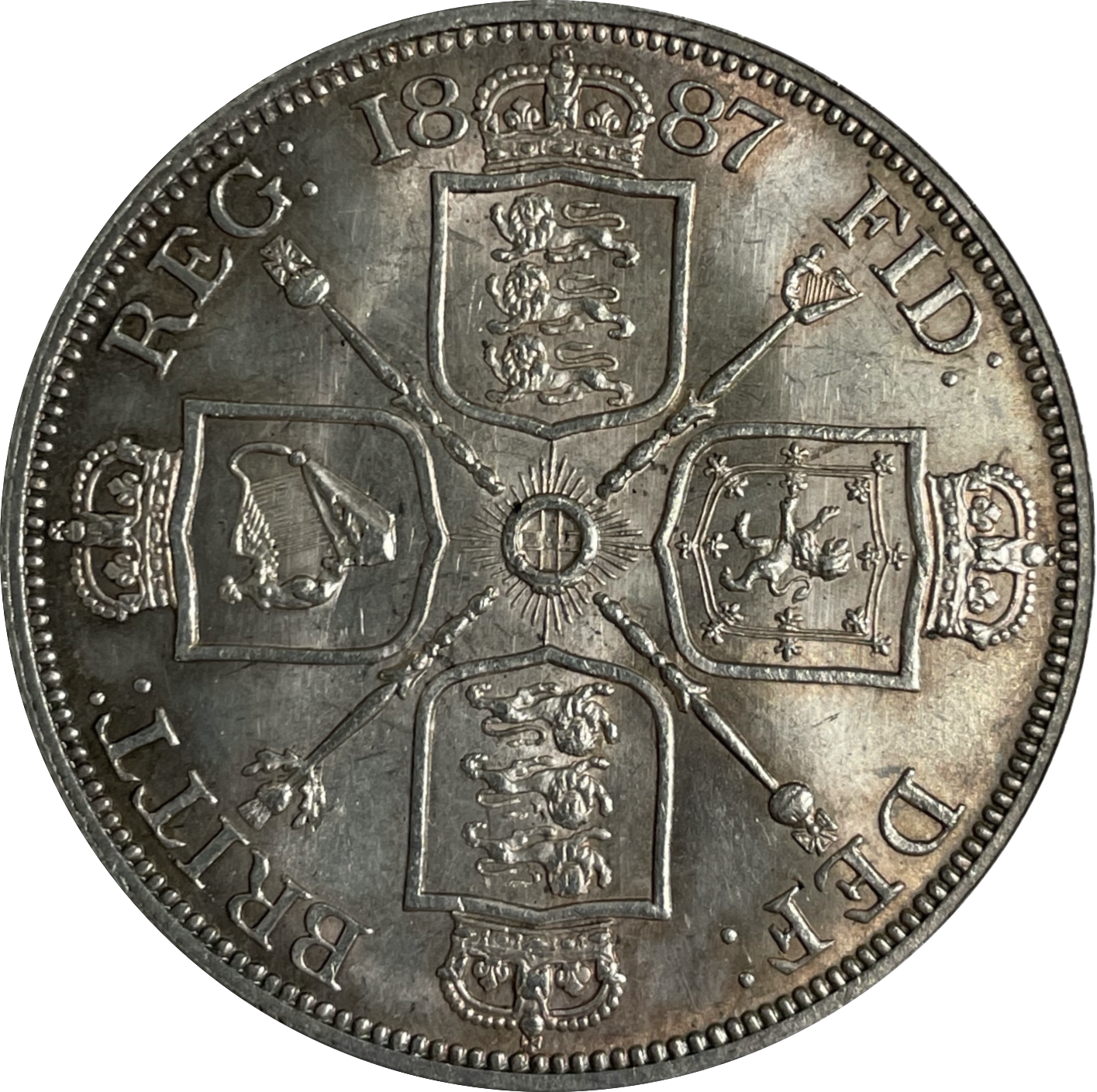
- Design: Crowned shields and sceptres
- Designer: Leonard Charles Wyon
- Design date: 1887

The double florin, or four-shilling piece, was a British coin produced by the Royal Mint between 1887 and 1890. One of the shortest-lived of all British coin denominations, it was struck in only four years. Its obverse, designed by Joseph Boehm and engraved by Leonard Charles Wyon, depicts Queen Victoria, whilst the reverse, featuring national symbols of the United Kingdom, was designed by Wyon based on the coinage of Charles II.

The double florin was introduced as part of a coinage redesign that took place in 1887, the year of Queen Victoria's Golden Jubilee. One purpose of the redesign was to replace portraits of the queen which had changed little since her youth, and which no longer resembled the monarch, who was nearing her seventieth birthday. Mint officials and politicians also sought to reduce dependence on the half sovereign, a gold coin worth ten shillings which was expensive to strike, by issuing the double florin (four shillings) and reintroducing the crown (five shillings) coin. They may also have intended a further decimalisation of the coinage after the introduction of the florin (two shillings, or one-tenth of a pound) in 1849.

When issued in June 1887, the Jubilee coinage provoked an outcry. The small royal crown Boehm had placed on Victoria's head caused widespread mockery. The double florin in particular was criticised as it was close in size to the five-shilling crown, leading to confusion, especially since neither coin was inscribed with its denomination. The confusion was said to be particularly acute in public houses, where barmaids accepted it believing it to be a crown, giving it the nickname of "Barmaid's Ruin" or "Barmaid's Grief". Minting of the coin ceased after 1890, though it remained in circulation. Upon full decimalisation in 1971, the double florin was not demonetised, and remains legal tender for 20p (£0.20).

== Background ==
During the 19th century, Britain continued its longtime monetary system, under which 12 pence constituted a shilling, and 20 shillings a pound. There was interest in decimalisation of this system, and in 1849, the florin, equal to two shillings or one tenth of a pound, was issued as a first step. It was intended to replace the half crown, worth two shillings and sixpence, and production of the half crown was discontinued in 1850, but resumed in 1874, and both coins were struck until full decimalisation in the 1970s. The crown, or five-shilling piece, was not struck for circulation between 1847 and 1887; the 1847 coinage was struck in limited numbers and possibly intended as keepsakes. When a double florin was proposed by a director of the Bank of England in 1874, the Deputy Master of the Royal Mint, Charles William Fremantle, opposed it.

The next largest coin in denomination was the gold half sovereign, equal to ten shillings. This was a small coin, equal in size to the silver sixpence (plating sixpences and passing them for half sovereigns was a continuing abuse). The government discouraged the use of half sovereigns—unlike silver coins, the sovereign and half sovereign were to contain their full value in precious metal, to an exacting standard set by the Coinage Act 1870. These limits were so tight that 45 per cent of newly-struck half sovereigns were rejected by the automatic scales at the Royal Mint, requiring their recoinage. The government profited through seignorage on silver coins at about 20 per cent, depending on the price of silver. Thus, the half sovereign was expensive in terms of both the value of its metal and its production costs, especially in comparison with the silver coinage. Such problems were less acute with the sovereign, for which demand continued high as a world-wide trade coin, whereas the half sovereign tended to remain in Britain. In 1884, the Gladstone government proposed to reduce the amount of gold in the half sovereign by a tenth, rendering it a token coin, but the change was abandoned. British gold coins were legal tender for payments in any amount, but silver coins were only legal tender to forty shillings.

== Inception ==
In September 1886, the Chancellor of the Exchequer, Lord Randolph Churchill, replied sympathetically to a proposal in the House of Commons to abolish the half sovereign and replace it with silver coins. Although Churchill was noncommittal, his son and biographer Winston wrote that he "harboured a deadly design against the half-sovereign—'that profligate little coin'—which he believed was an expensive and unnecessary feature of British currency". Lord Randolph came to favour withdrawal of the half sovereign, with its place taken by large silver coins, and the redemption of outstanding half sovereigns to be paid for in part with silver coins and in part with £1 bank notes, with some portion to be replaced with sovereigns. Since this would mean the largest denomination coin with which change could be given from a pound would be the half crown, James Currie, governor of the Bank of England, suggested a double florin to aid in change giving. Before these matters could be decided, Lord Randolph resigned as chancellor in late December 1886. His successor, George Goschen, was slow to decide whether to discontinue the half sovereign, and eventually decided against it. Nevertheless, Goschen was no supporter of the half sovereign, and none were struck at the Royal Mint's facility at Tower Hill between June 1887 and February 1890.

Among those pressing for the issuance of large silver coins were the supporters of bimetallism, making both gold and silver legal tender. A four-shilling piece had been common in proposals for a fully bimetallic coinage since at least 1868. Increasing the amount of silver used for coinage would be a step towards bimetallism. The issue of bimetallism was especially acute in Britain in the mid-1880s because of the problems in British India, where the government received revenue in silver but then had to make payments to Britain in gold, at a time when the value of silver relative to gold was decreasing. Increased seignorage from large silver coins might allow Britain to grant India financial relief.

No document has been found that clearly explains the decision to issue a double florin. The numismatist G. P. Dyer, in his article on the influences that brought about the double florin, wrote:

Its origins are clearly to be found in a desire to limit use of the costly half-sovereign, something that in turn would conserve gold and expand the demand for silver, both desirable objectives given the concern that a diminished supply of gold and a surplus of silver, by disturbing their relative values, had harmed trade and hurt the Government of India. That both double-florins and crowns should be issued suggests ambivalence and indecision as to which might be preferred, but in the event the British public was quick to show that it cared for neither.

Sir John Clapham, in his 1944 history of the Bank of England, described the double florin as "a half-hearted concession to admirers of the decimal system". Issuance of the double florin was also justified in the hope that, as a large silver "dollar"-sized coin, it would compete with the Mexican "dollar" as a trade coin in the Far East, and Fremantle was encouraged when £1,000 of the new coins were distributed to a bank connected with the Eastern trade in 1887. Nevertheless, the intrinsic value of the double florin was about sixpence less than the Mexican coin, and less than five per cent of double florins were sent abroad.

== Design ==
=== Obverse ===
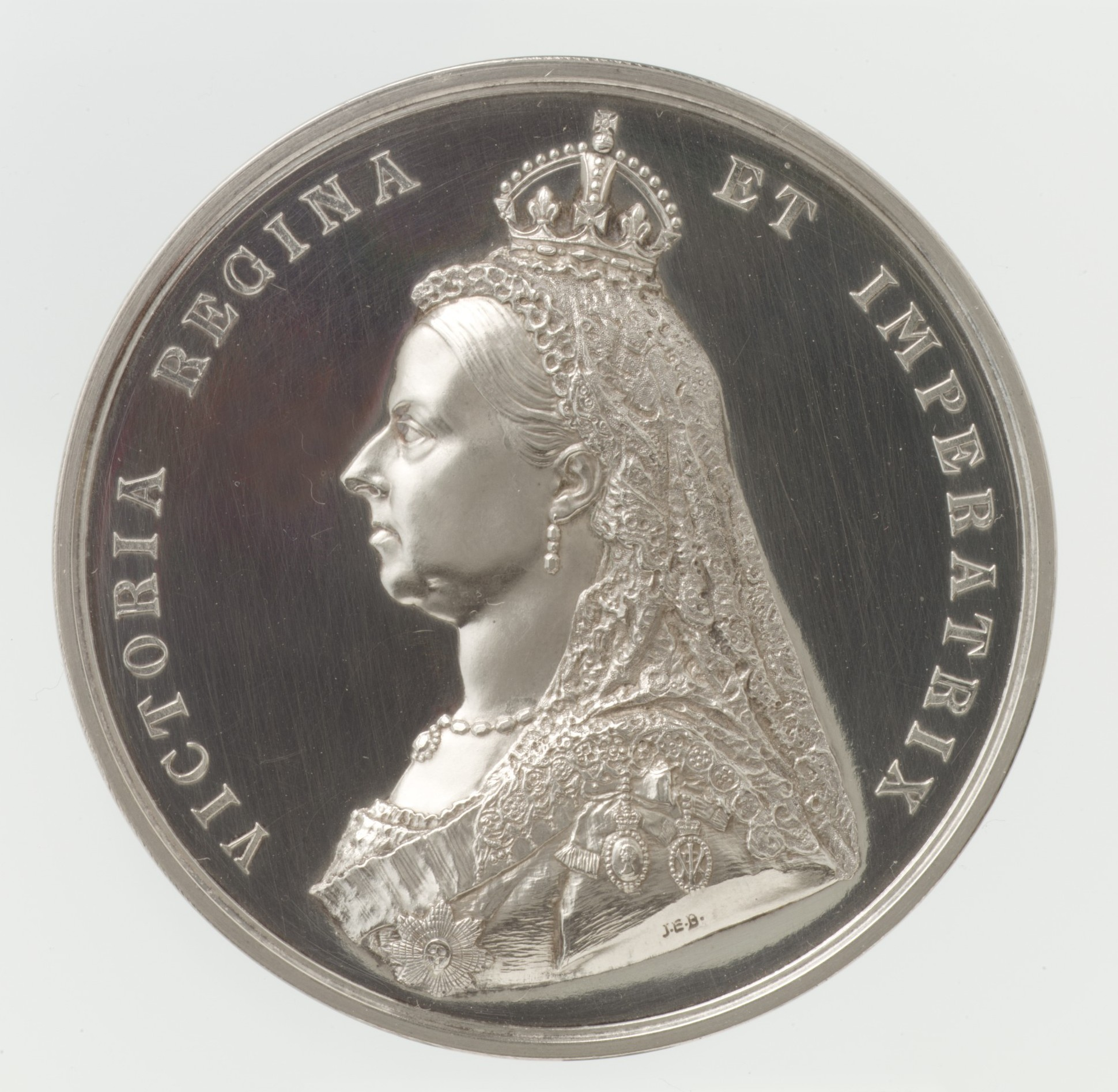
Boehm's medal for Victoria's Golden Jubilee in 1887

By 1887, Queen Victoria had been on the throne for half a century, and was nearly 70 years old. Nevertheless, the coins of the United Kingdom still depicted her as a young woman, as they had since the first issuance of coins depicting her in 1838. Her Golden Jubilee in 1887 gave an opportunity to place new designs on the coinage, and all the circulation coins but the bronze pieces saw a new portrait of her that year.

In 1879, Joseph Boehm had been chosen, apparently by Queen Victoria herself, to execute a portrait of the queen that could be used as a model for coinage designs. Boehm prepared a likeness that was used for a medal marking the queen's Jubilee, and which was adapted for the coinage in lower relief by Leonard Charles Wyon, who made small changes.

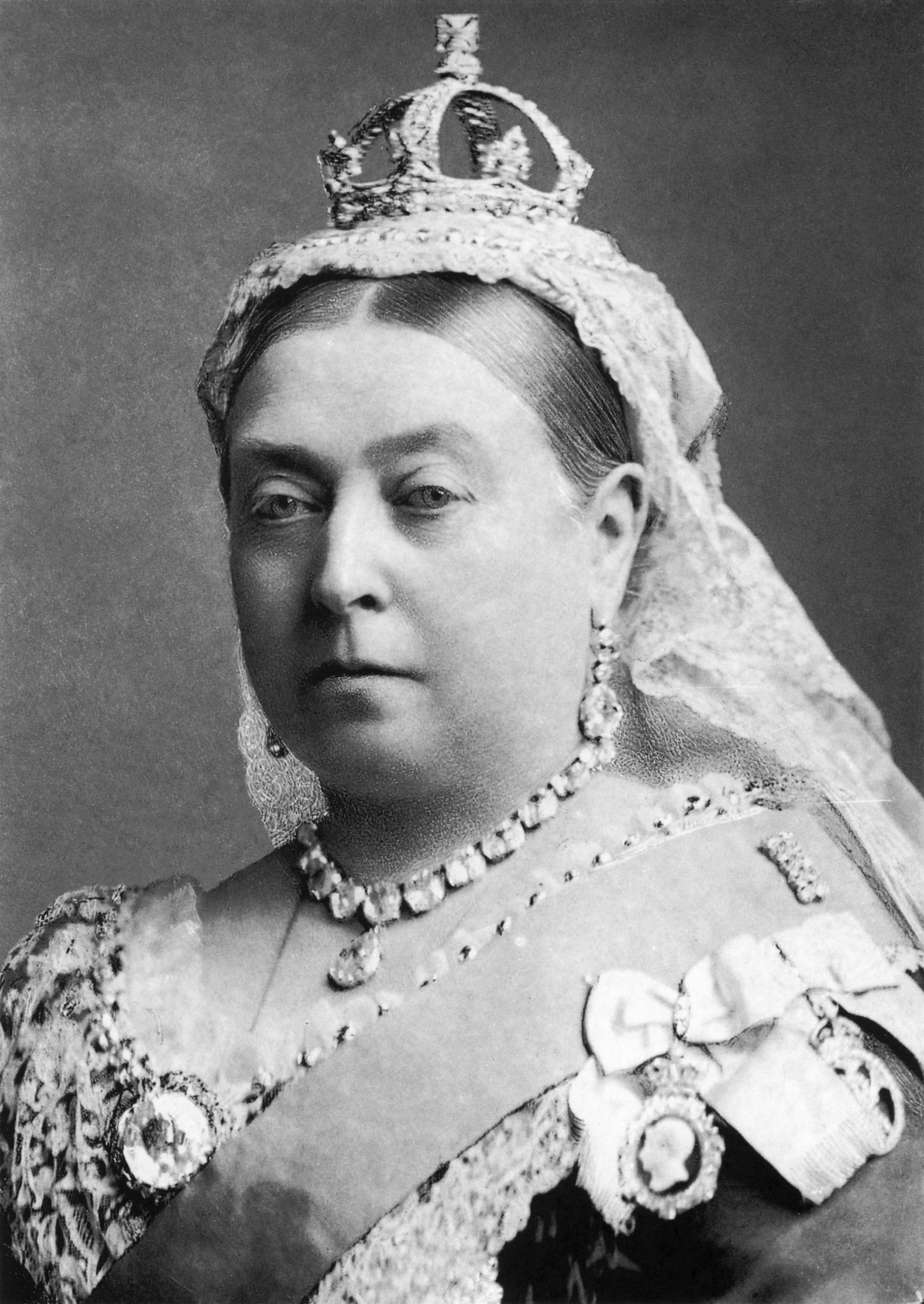
Official portrait of Queen Victoria. 1882

The obverse of the Jubilee coinage, first issued in 1887, including the double florin, features that likeness. It quickly became controversial, although it was a portrait from life, as the queen had sat for Boehm. The obverse of the 1887 coins, according to the numismatic author, Howard Linecar, "produced a storm of disapproval, directed particularly against the effigy of the queen. How this obverse design was passed by the queen herself is a small mystery." In their article on Boehm's role in the Jubilee coinage, Dyer and Mark Stocker (a biographer of Boehm) agree: "even though the queen's artistic judgment was admittedly a hit and miss affair, it still seems curious that neither she nor those most closely involved had any inkling of the likely public response". The historian Sir Charles Oman deemed the Jubilee coinage, "the greatest disappointment of the century."

Victoria wears a small crown, which she had bought so as not to have to wear a heavier one. It was the crown that she preferred to wear at that time, and appears on other contemporary effigies of her. According to Linecar, "Place your finger over the crown, and there is nothing odd about the portrait: it is just that of a widowed lady in mourning. The disapprobation therefore turns upon the ridiculously small crown ... When she (and the public) saw herself as others saw her, did she, as many of us do, suddenly become aware that she was wearing a 'hat' that did not suit her?"

Simon Heffer, in his history of Britain in the decades before the First World War, stated that the engraving on the Jubilee coinage was "honest and lifelike", but that Victoria "looked sour, chinless and porcine, her over-sized head made all the more glaring by a crown several sizes too small being perched upon it, above a bizarre flowing head-dress". The art critic George Moore stated of the Jubilee coinage, "the melting-pot will put that right one of these days". The numismatist Lawrence W. Cobb, writing in 1985, took a more nuanced view of the portrait, "Wyon seems to have tried to soften the Queen's look of age, tension and strain [on the medal], but in so doing he lost some of the strength and vigor of the Queen's indomitable spirit. Nonetheless, even with its faults, Wyon's portrait preserves the majesty of the Queen's presence."

In addition to bearing the crown, Victoria's head has a widow's veil. Following the death of Albert, Prince Consort in 1861, she had remained in mourning, and the veil would have been black in colour. The veil descends from a widow's cap worn under the crown. The queen has a pearl necklace and there is an earring in her visible ear. She wears the Ribbon and Star of the Order of the Garter and the badge of the Order of the Crown of India; the artist's initials JEB may be found on the truncation of her bust.

=== Reverse and inscriptions ===
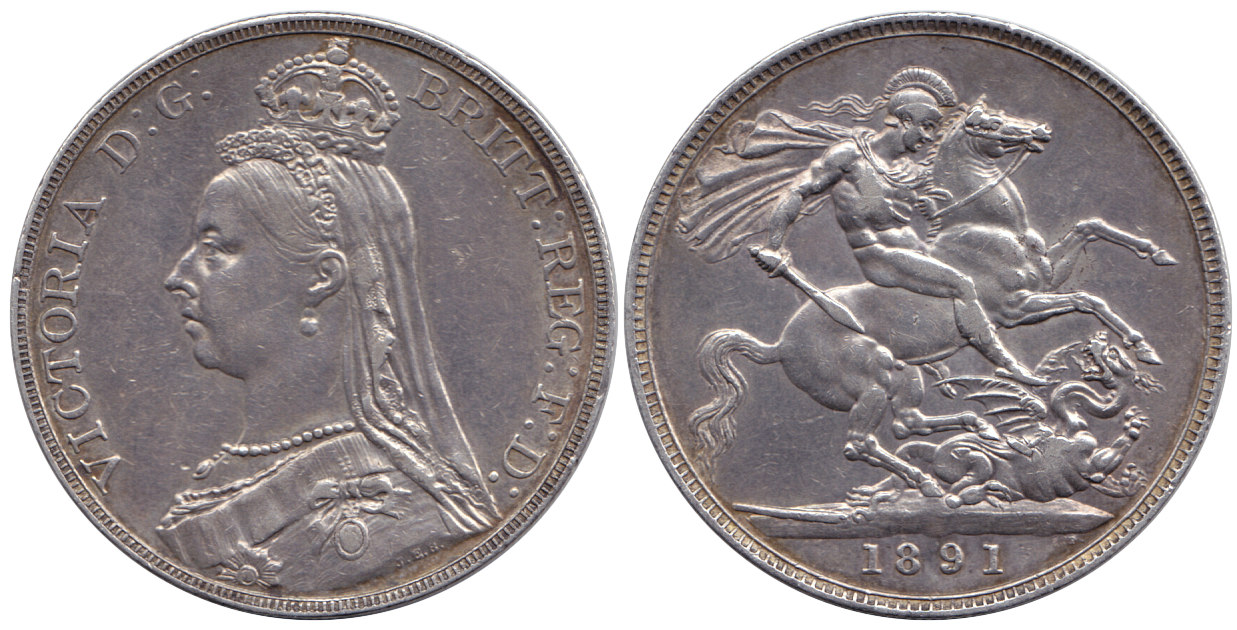
The double florin was often confused with the crown, which carried a near-identical obverse and was similar in size; neither carried a statement of its value.

The reverse has four cruciform shields, with sceptres in the angles between them. This was based on the designs of John Roettier for the gold coinage of Charles II. The reverse designs for the florin and double florin (which are nearly identical) were described in the proclamation making them current as "contained in Four Shields arranged crosswise, each shield crowned, and between the Shields Four Sceptres surmounted by Orbs, a Thistle and a Harp, and a Star of the Garter in the Centre". These constituted the arms of the United Kingdom. The shields at top and bottom are the arms of England, the one on the right that of Scotland, and on the left that of Ireland. Gertrude Rawlings wrote in 1898 that the design for the double florin is "radiating kitchen pokers and tea trays".

Around the rim of the double florin are abbreviated versions of some of the queen's titles, with the date on the reverse. The obverse legend reads VICTORIA DEI GRATIA (Victoria by the Grace of God) and continuing on the reverse, BRITT: REG: FID: DEF: (Note: In full, Victoria Dei Gratia Britanniarum Regina Fidei Defensor) (Queen of the Britains, Defender of the Faith). The "Britains" in the legend is meant to include the colonies and other territories. Not present is IND: IMP:, (Note: Indiae Imperatrix) Empress of India. The act which permitted Victoria to adopt that title had forbidden her to use it within the United Kingdom, and the double florin reflects that decision. The queen wanted that title to appear on British coinage, and would get her way on the next issue, appearing beginning in 1893, after the abolition of the double florin.

Like the other designs initially issued in June 1887, that for the double florin contains no indication of the coin's value. By 1889, even the individual depicted on the Jubilee coinage had turned against it, writing in a note, "the Queen dislikes the new coinage very much, and wishes the old one could still be used and the new one gradually disused, and then a new one struck." In 1891, the Mint set up a committee to judge entries in a fresh competition. The winner, a design by Thomas Brock, was placed on the coinage beginning between 1893 and 1895, with new reverses for the surviving silver coins between the sixpence and half crown; and on them is a statement of the value.

== Production ==
=== Release and controversy ===
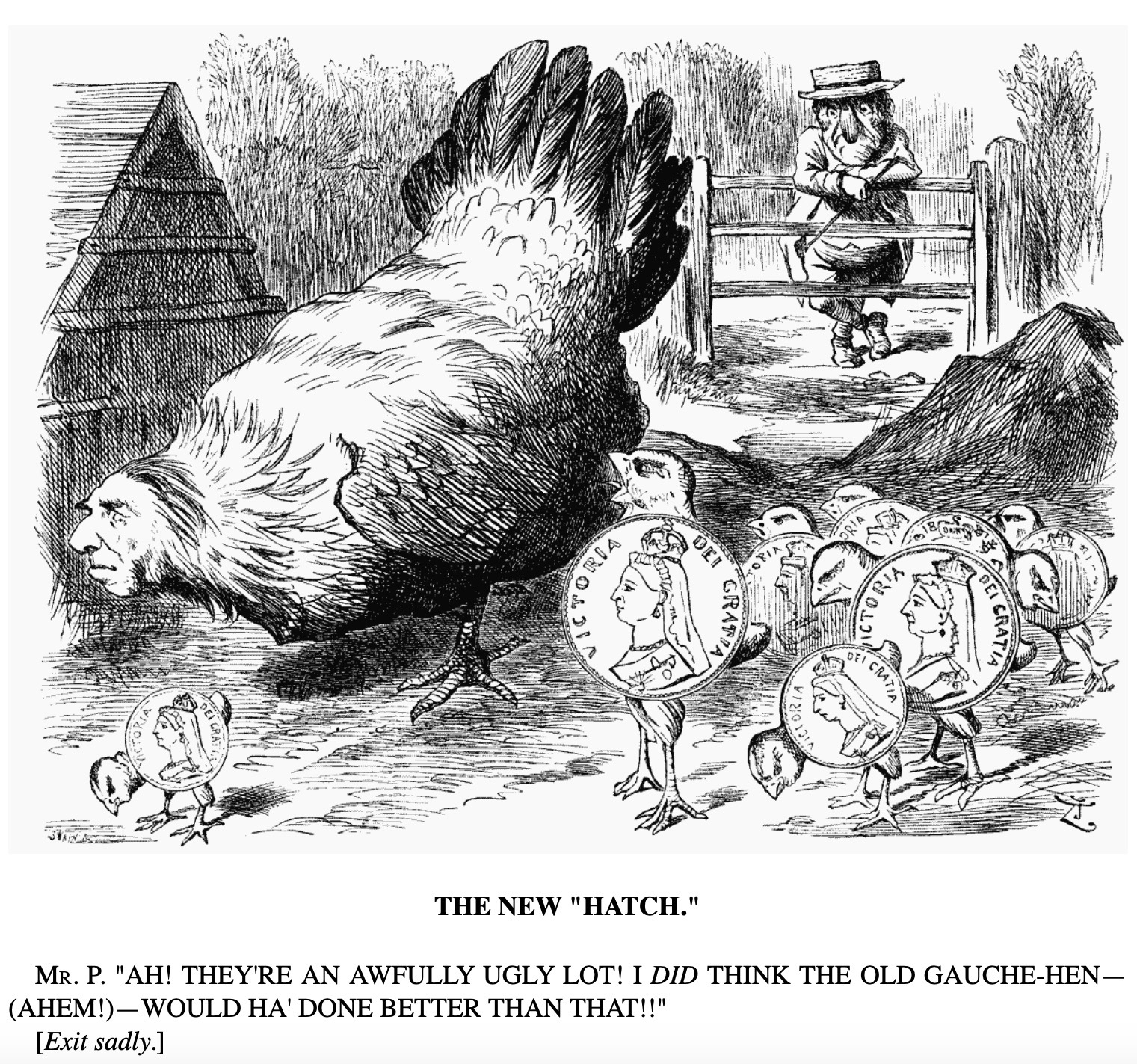
Punch magazine satirises the Jubilee coin issue, 9 July 1887. Punch is disappointed at the ugliness of the offspring of "Gauche-hen" (Goschen).

In December 1886, Boehm succeeded in making a model of the obverse design with which he was satisfied. It was not until February 1887 that coinage dies were made, engraved by Wyon, from which pattern coins could be struck. On 24 March 1887, Fremantle submitted the obverses of at least some of the denominations for approval by Goschen and then Victoria. Although it is not clear if an obverse for the double florin was submitted at this time, there is a uniface piece showing only the reverse of the double florin in the Royal Mint's collection that may date from this time. Victoria's approval of Boehm's design was accompanied by a wish that the new coins show some wording to indicate they were struck in the Jubilee year. Fremantle was unwilling to countenance something that would delay the new coinage, but Victoria was so reluctant to yield that Goschen asked Fremantle to reconsider, but he declined to do so.

On 12 May 1887, Fremantle officially announced that there would be changes to the gold and silver coinage, including the introduction of a double florin, and an Order in Council to that effect was printed in The London Gazette on 17 May. Later that month, the Annual Report of the Deputy Master of the Mint contained engravings of the new issue; Fremantle wrote in it of the double florin, "it remains to be seen whether this handsome coin will be generally popular". Fremantle authored an article for the June number of Murray's Magazine entitled "Our New Coins and Their Pedigree" in which he said of the double florin, "I am not without hope that these attempts to substitute silver coins of artistic design for the somewhat commonplace currency to which we have been accustomed during the last fifty years may be favourably viewed by the public; and it is possible that the introduction of a larger piece than those which we have hitherto been in the habit of using, in the shape of the double florin, may in many ways be found useful."

The Times, discussing the new double florin, could see no reason why the coin was necessary, describing it as "very heavy, very large, and very inconvenient". The Standard wrote on 19 May that "there is no particular need for a four-shilling piece ... And, now that the double florin will form the middle denomination between the two shillings and the half-sovereign, probably a fresh attempt will be made to withdraw it [the half-crown] from circulation". The Belfast News Letter, writing on 23 May, stated, "It is difficult to imagine what purpose the double florin will be calculated to serve; for the inconvenience of large and heavy silver coins is too great to be overlooked". The Pall Mall Gazette wrote the same day that the double florin "in all probability will have very little currency in the United Kingdom. The meaning of the coin is that it should not be a double florin, but a dollar, and as such pass current in the East, in Canada, and other countries such as the United States where dollars are used". The crown was struck for circulation for the first time in at least 40 years, but would fare little better than the double florin, though it would last a bit longer, continuing to be struck in decreasing numbers until 1902.

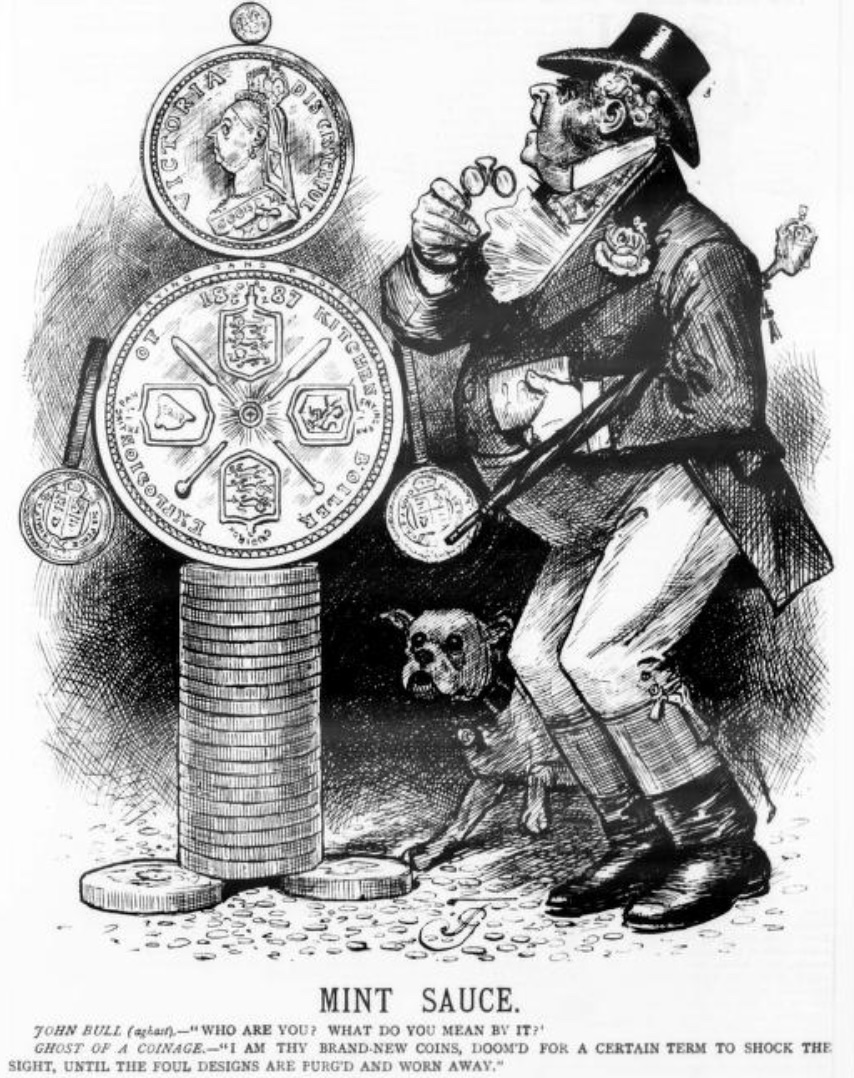
"Victoria disgraced": a Fun magazine, issued on 20 June 1887, criticises the florin or double florin, labelling it an "Explosion of Kitchen Boiler", replete with frying pans.

The Jubilee coins, including the double florin and the crown, were issued in June 1887, with the official release initially set for 21 June, the date on which the queen's Golden Jubilee was to be celebrated. Since this day had been proclaimed a bank holiday, the release date was changed to 20 June, on which date the coins were to be conveyed from the Royal Mint to the Bank of England and there used to fill orders from London banks. Provincial banks would not have the new coins until at least the 22nd, and the Dundee Courier reported that "it is expected that the demand for the double florin will soon exhaust the first supply". Once the new coins were released, there was a deeply negative reaction by public and press. According to Dyer and Stocker, "When the storm of condemnation erupted, Fremantle seemed genuinely taken aback at 'the sad turn affairs have taken, most unexpected to me'. It was some storm: questions in Parliament, outspoken criticism from all sections of the press, derisive cartoons and doggerel in Fun and Punch, and even some unfriendly comment by John Evans in his presidential address to the Royal Numismatic Society. The coinage was seen as the worst of all worlds; poorly executed, undignified on the obverse, and inefficient in not specifying values on the reverse." According to Heffer, as Victoria's "popularity had recovered considerably among her people by 1887, there was an outcry at this less than idealised representation". The double florin was particularly criticised.

This criticism entered the House of Commons, where Goschen answered questions about the new coinage on 23 and 28 June. The chancellor told MPs that just as the public did not confuse the florin and half crown, they would not confuse the double florin and crown. The double florin's obverse was nearly identical to that of the crown, but for the fact that the five-shilling piece carried the royal legend on the obverse that the four-shilling bore in part on either side. The two coins had different reverses. The only immediate effect of the outcry was that the sixpence, which lacked a statement of its denomination and was gilded to pass as a half sovereign, was given again its former reverse design, which stated its value.

=== Continued production and abolition ===
In December 1887, Fremantle wrote to Robert Hunt, deputy master of the Sydney branch of the Royal Mint, that the reasons for the double florin's issuance were very complicated, and that he doubted that it would "ever be in great demand". On 30 May 1888, the London correspondent of the Liverpool Mercury stated that "nearly £100,000 of the double florin was produced, and nearly the whole sum has disappeared ... the double florin has not become popular. Up to this date it has failed to obtain a general currency."

There was confusion between the double florin and the crown, which gave the four-shilling piece the nickname "Barmaid's Grief", as they were said to mistake double florins for the larger coin. With only 2 mm difference between the diameters of the double florin and the crown, there is anecdotal evidence that some at public houses lost their livelihood to the "Barmaid's Ruin". The Banker's Magazine wrote in 1890, "yet few persons, even few cashiers, however experienced they may be, will readily distinguish at a glance, a crown from a double florin. They would find it, we believe, a difficult thing to be perfectly sure which coin they were dealing with unless they examined the reverse and saw whether or not the knight and the dragon [the crown's design] was on it".

The year 1889 saw the largest number issued, both of the double florin and of the revived crown, with more than a million struck of each. This was because the government used the two large coins in pay packets for its employees, and because of an agreement it had made with the Bank of England to reimburse the bank for conveying silver coin to its branches and to provincial applicants. In March 1890, Goschen told the Commons that "there can hardly be said to be any similarity between the double florin and the crown" and was met with cries of "Oh!", indicating disbelief. On 5 May, upon being asked if there was any consideration being given to withdrawing either the crown or the double florin, he stated that the crown was growing in popularity and, "as to the four shilling piece, it is premature to come to any decision. Time alone can show what is the real use of a coin." Nevertheless, minting of the double florin ceased forever in August 1890. According to Richard Lobel in the Coincraft Standard Catalogue of English and UK Coins, "this denomination, unpopular at the time of issue, lasted until 1890, when it had outlived its usefulness. The use of the Boehm portrait no doubt accelerated its demise." Sir John Craig, in his history of the Royal Mint, stated that "its closeness to the 5s. piece, its size and its novelty were fatal handicaps; it was dropped ... after an issue of 2 1/2 million specimens, and the flop was so flagrant that the Mint, contrary to all its practice, took the coins back at full face value on request".

== Aftermath ==
Herbert Paul (member for Edinburgh South) said ... he would like to draw attention to the double-florin and ask what was to be done about it. He did not believe that any constitutional change that could be devised by the wit of man was capable of causing half so much trouble as the difficulty in distinguishing between a four-shilling piece and a five-shilling piece. The late Chancellor of the Exchequer said a man could distinguish between one coin and the other in the dark even when he was drunk, but he [Mr Paul] found it difficult to distinguish between them in the best light when he was sober, as he was at all times. The sooner the four-shilling pieces were withdrawn the better would it be for the commercial and social interests of the country.

— House of Commons debates, 14 March 1893

Boehm died in December 1890, and according to the art critic Marion Spielmann, who knew him well, "his gentle spirit bowed in silence beneath the torrent of scornful condemnation with which his work was received", leading to his illness and death. Wyon died the following August, and the numismatist Leonard Forrer wrote in his Biographical Dictionary of Medallists, that Wyon had wanted to design the Jubilee coinage's obverse: "towards the close of his career, he underwent deep disappointment at the Government accepting Sir J.E. Boehm's design for the obverse of the 1887 'Jubilee' coinage, and it is believed that this hastened his end."

In February 1891, Goschen appointed a Committee on the Design of Coins under the leadership of Sir John Lubbock, the Liberal MP. At its first meeting that month, the committee unanimously decided that the double florin should be discontinued. This was confirmed in a statement to the Commons by Goschen on 25 May. The committee issued its report in March 1892, and an amended version in May; both recommended that the double florin not be retained. Fremantle reiterated this in his annual report as Deputy Master of the Mint for 1892. In January 1893, The Daily Telegraph recalled that the double florin had been universally disliked, "blessing neither him who gave nor him who took". In 1895, Robert William Hanbury, the Financial Secretary to the Treasury, stated in response to a parliamentary question that he did not know why the double florin had been issued, and that some great distinction should have been made between it and the crown. The double florin's rival, the crown, continued to be issued, and considerable efforts were made to circulate it, in the hope it would displace some half sovereigns from trade, but by 1902 it was clear that the main use of the coin was to pay government wages at the dockyards, after which it immediately went back to the banks, and it was stopped.

By 1914, some 70 per cent of the issued double florins had been withdrawn, but some remained in circulation. A 1931 report for the American government mentioned the double florin as the sole obsolete coin issue circulating in Britain, and described it as "rarely seen". After silver ceased to be struck for circulating coins in 1946, specimens of the double florin showed up in the Royal Mint's silver recovery programmes in the early 1960s. Revival of the double florin was considered from time to time and may have reached the point of production of trial pieces in 1950. The double florin was not demonetised when decimalisation of the pound occurred in 1971, and it remains legal tender for 20p (£0.20).

== Collecting ==
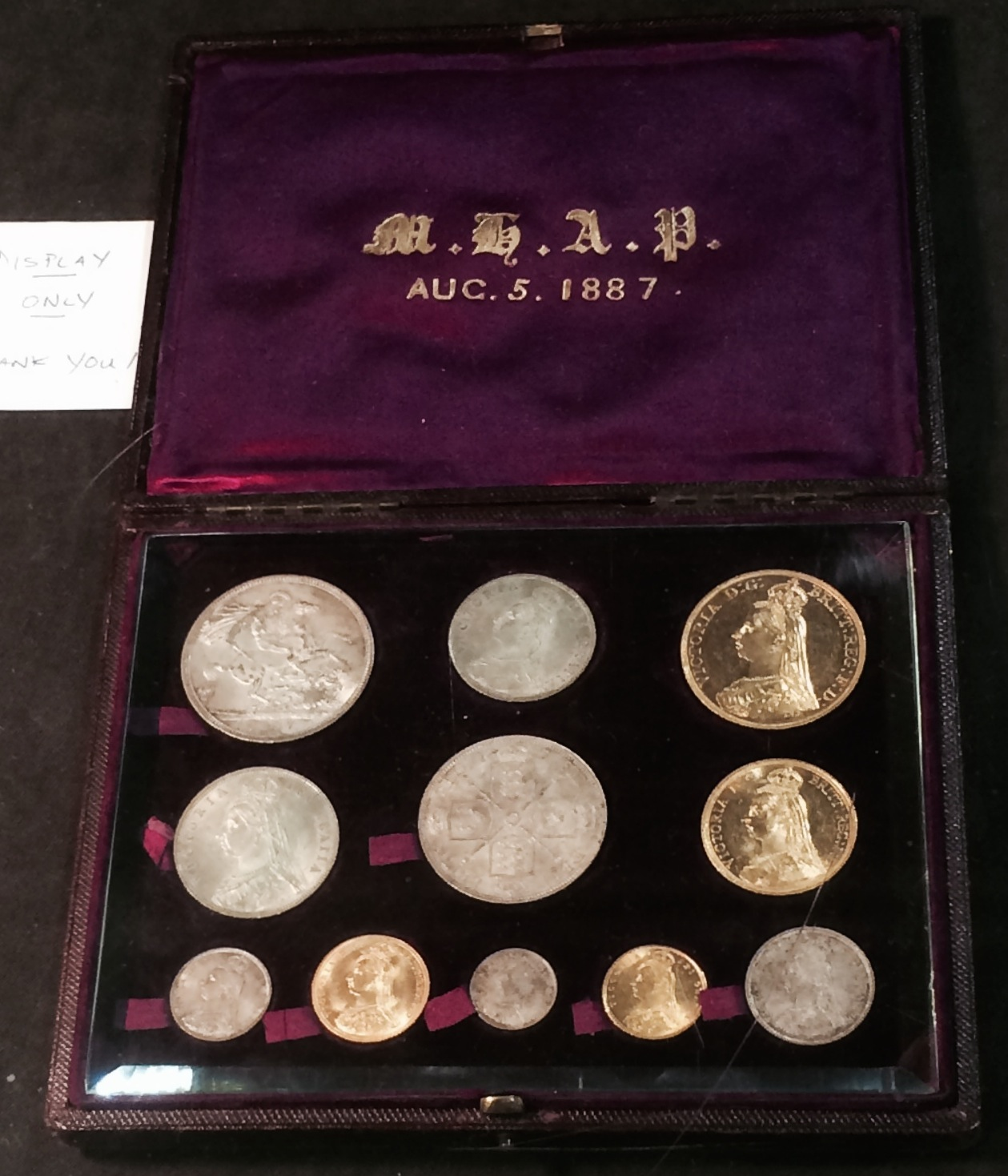
Proof set of the 1887 Jubilee issue. The double florin is at centre and the crown at upper left, demonstrating the similar size between them.

The series of the double florin, with only four years to collect, has become popular among collectors seeking a complete set. There are a number of varieties in the set. The original obverse and reverse were flat; a second obverse and a second reverse, each with a number of slight differences and with a slightly concave field, were instituted for some 1887 issues and were used in subsequent years. The date 1887 was originally rendered as I887, with a Roman numeral I, but this was modified to an Arabic 1 even before the reverse was changed. On some 1888 and 1889 coins, the second I in VICTORIA is rendered as an upside-down Arabic number 1. The design of the reverse was slightly enlarged for the 1890 issue. Proof coins exist for 1887, some with the first obverse and first reverse (and a Roman I), and some with the second obverse and second reverse (and an Arabic 1).

The Numismatic Guaranty Company, a coin grading service, differentiates little between the circulation-issue varieties of the double florin, in all but the highest grades, rating each (in American dollars, and as of 2022) at $15.50 (the melt value), rising to between $400 and $750 in near-pristine condition. The 1887 proof coins carry a premium over that.

== Bibliography ==
- Browne, W. A. (1899). The Merchants' Handbook of Money, Weights and Measures, with Their British Equivalents (5th ed.). London: Edward Stanford. OCLC 20554145.
- Churchill, Winston (1906). Lord Randolph Churchill. Vol. ii. London: Macmillan & Co. OCLC 59397927.
- Clancy, Kevin (2017) [2015]. A History of the Sovereign: Chief Coin of the World (second ed.). Llantrisant, Wales: Royal Mint Museum. ISBN 978-1-869917-00-5.
- Cobb, Lawrence W. (February 1985). "The Veiled Queen". The Numismatist: 255–259.
- Craig, John (2010) [1953]. The Mint (paperback ed.). Cambridge, United Kingdom: Cambridge University Press. ISBN 978-0-521-17077-2.
- Dyer, G. P. (1995). "Gold, Silver and the Double Florin" (PDF). British Numismatic Journal. 64: 114–125.
- Dyer, G. P.; Gaspar, P. P. (1992). "Reform, the New Technology and Tower Hill". In Challis, C. E. (ed.). A New History of the Royal Mint. Cambridge, United Kingdom: Cambridge University Press. pp. 398–606. ISBN 978-0-521-24026-0.
- Dyer, G. P.; Stocker, Mark (1984). "Edgar Boehm and the Jubilee Coinage" (PDF). British Numismatic Journal. 54: 274–288.
- Heffer, Simon (2021). The Age of Decadence: A History of Britain: 1880–1914 (eBook ed.). New York: Penguin Books. ISBN 978-1-64313-671-4.
- Lant, Jeffrey L. (1973). "The Jubilee Coinage of 1887" (PDF). British Numismatic Journal. 43: 132–141.
- Linecar, Howard W.A. (1977). British Coin Designs and Designers. London: G. Bell & Sons Ltd. ISBN 978-0-7135-1931-0.
- Lobel, Richard, ed. (1999) [1995]. Coincraft's Standard Catalogue English & UK Coins 1066 to Date (5th ed.). London: Standard Catalogue Publishers Ltd. ISBN 978-0-9526228-8-8.
- Lorich, Bruce (January 1993). "A Victorian Mystery". The Numismatist: 1379–1381, 1429–1430.
- Moore, George (1923). Modern Painting (Carra ed.). New York: Boni & Liveright, Inc. OCLC 256357089.
- Seaby, Peter (1985). The Story of British Coinage. London: B. A. Seaby Ltd. ISBN 978-0-900652-74-5.
- Spink (2016). Coins of England and the United Kingdom (52nd ed.). London: Spink. ISBN 978-1-907427-98-5.
- Stocker, Mark. (1996). "The Coinage of 1893" (PDF). British Numismatic Journal. 66: 67–86.
