= Simon Heffer, Baron Blackwater =

British journalist and historian (born 1960)

The Right Honourable The Lord Blackwater
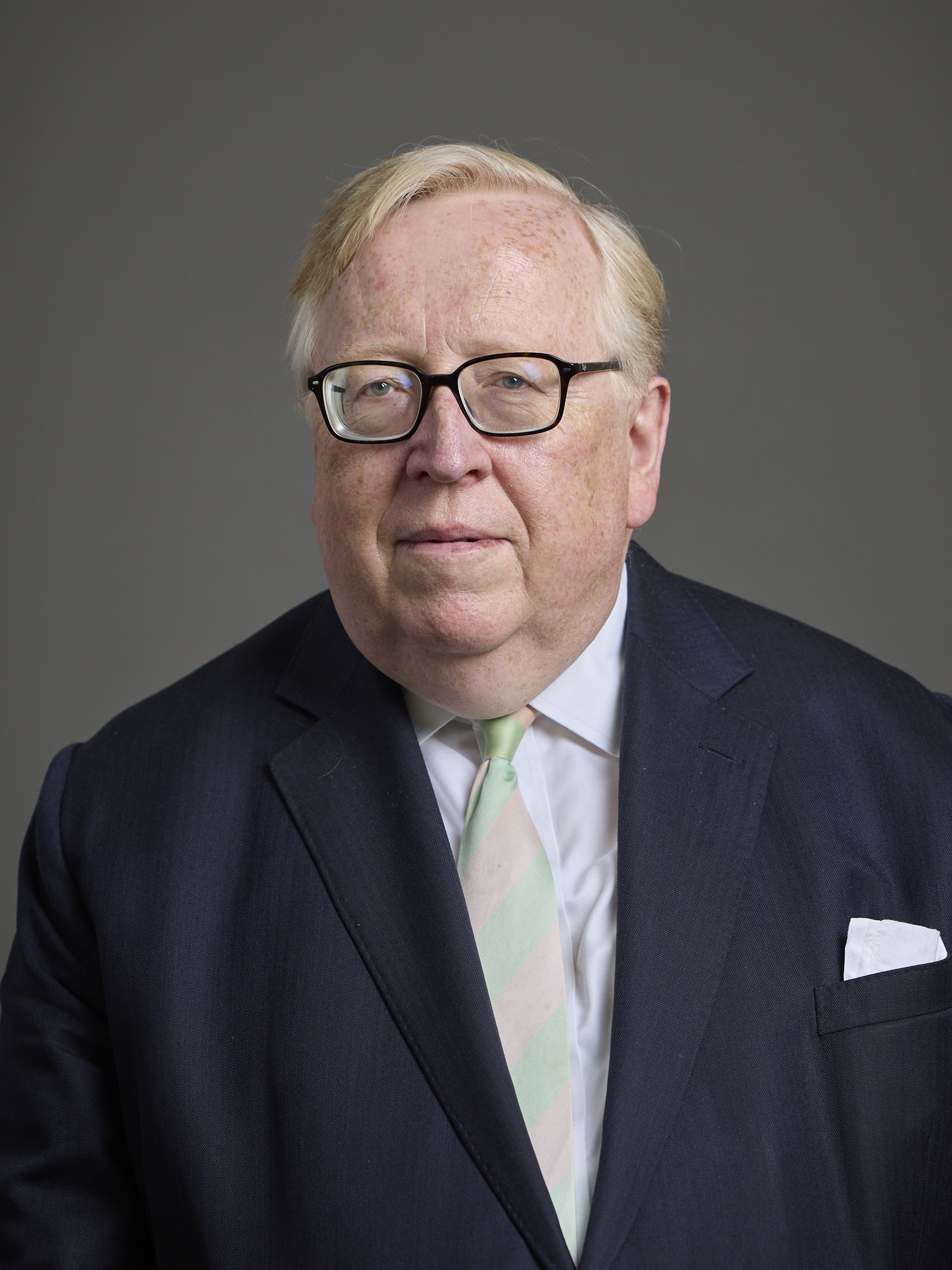
- Official portrait, 2026
- Born: Simon James Heffer; 18 July 1960 (age 66); Chelmsford, Essex, England
- Education: King Edward VI Grammar School, Chelmsford; Corpus Christi College, Cambridge
- Occupations: Historian; journalist; author; political commentator
- Political party: Conservative
- Spouse: Diana Caroline Clee (m. 1987)
- Children: 2
- Honours: Life Peerage

Member of the House of Lords
- Lord Temporal
- Life peerage 27 January 2026

Simon James Heffer, Baron Blackwater (born 18 July 1960) is an English historian, journalist, author, political commentator and member of the House of Lords. He has published several biographies and a series of books on the social history of Great Britain from the mid-nineteenth century until the end of the First World War. He was appointed professorial research fellow at the University of Buckingham in 2017.

Heffer worked as a columnist for the Daily Mail and since 2015 has had a weekly column in The Sunday Telegraph. As a political commentator, Heffer takes a socially conservative position.

== Early life and education ==
Son of James Heffer (died 1971), of Woodham Ferrers, Chelmsford, Essex, and Joyce Mary, née Clements, Simon Heffer was born at Chelmsford, and was educated at the King Edward VI Grammar School there before going to read English at Corpus Christi College, Cambridge (MA); after he had become a successful journalist and author, his old university awarded him a PhD degree in History for his 1998 biography of Enoch Powell.

== Career ==
=== Journalism ===
Heffer worked for The Daily Telegraph until 1995. He worked as a columnist for the Daily Mail from 1995 to 2005. He rejoined the Telegraph in October 2005 as a columnist and associate editor. Martin Newland, the Daily Telegraph's editor at the time, described the newspaper as Heffer's "natural journalistic home". He left the Telegraph in May 2011 to "pursue a role in journalism and broadcasting" and "complete a major literary project". It had been speculated that his departure had been prompted by his constant attacks on David Cameron's government, of which the Telegraph had been generally supportive. Heffer later rejoined the Daily Mail to edit a new online comment section, called RightMinds, of the paper's online edition. He returned to the Daily Telegraph in June 2015 and has a weekly column in The Sunday Telegraph.

=== Historian and author ===
Heffer has written biographies of the historian and essayist Thomas Carlyle and the composer Ralph Vaughan Williams. His 1998 biography of the British politician Enoch Powell, Like the Roman, was described by the New Statesman as "a lucid and majestic tribute" to the politician. He received his PhD degree in Modern History from the University of Cambridge for the Powell biography.

In September 2010, Heffer published Strictly English: the Correct Way to Write... and Why it Matters, a guide to English grammar and usage. The book met with some negative reception. Since 2010, he has published several historical works such as A Short History of Power (2010) and a series of three books on the social history of Great Britain from the mid nineteenth century until the end of the First World War: High Minds: the Victorians and the Birth of Modern Britain (2013), The Age of Decadence: Britain 1880 to 1914 and Staring at God: Britain 1914 to 1919 (2019).

Heffer became a professorial research fellow at the University of Buckingham in 2017.

== Hillsborough comments ==
Heffer said in 2012 that he wrote the first draft of a Spectator editorial in 2004 regarding the death of Kenneth Bigley, which said in part:

The extreme reaction to Mr Bigley's murder is fed by the fact that he was a Liverpudlian. Liverpool is a handsome city with a tribal sense of community. A combination of economic misfortune – its docks were, fundamentally, on the wrong side of England when Britain entered what is now the European Union – and an excessive predilection for welfarism have created a peculiar, and deeply unattractive, psyche among many Liverpudlians. They see themselves whenever possible as victims, and resent their victim status; yet at the same time they wallow in it. ... They cannot accept that they might have made any contribution to their misfortunes, but seek rather to blame someone else for it, thereby deepening their sense of shared tribal grievance against the rest of society. The deaths of more than 50 Liverpool football supporters at Hillsborough in 1989 was undeniably a greater tragedy than the single death, however horrible, of Mr Bigley; but that is no excuse for Liverpool's failure to acknowledge, even to this day, the part played in the disaster by drunken fans at the back of the crowd who mindlessly tried to fight their way into the ground that Saturday afternoon. The police became a convenient scapegoat, and The Sun newspaper a whipping-boy for daring, albeit in a tasteless fashion, to hint at the wider causes of the incident.

These comments (sometimes incorrectly attributed to the then-editor of the Spectator, Boris Johnson) were widely circulated following the April 2016 verdict by the Hillsborough inquest's second hearing proving unlawful killing of the 96 dead at Hillsborough. Johnson apologised at the time of the publication, saying: "That was a lie that unfortunately and very, very regrettably got picked up in a leader in the Spectator in 2004, which I was then editing."

== Politics ==
Heffer was politically left-wing in his teenage years, but had abandoned his views by the time he went to university, although he states he still has a lingering respect and affection for several past figures of the left, such as Michael Foot and Tony Benn.

Heffer is a social conservative, though in a 2006 interview he described himself as a Gladstonian Liberal. He supported the retention of Section 28, and opposed the reduction of the age of consent for homosexuality to that for heterosexuality, as well as the liberalisation of laws on abortion and divorce. He opposed the removal of hereditary peers from the House of Lords in 1999.

Heffer believes that Christianity should have a strong role in shaping the moral foundations of society and public policy despite being an atheist.

In 2008 Heffer called for the United Nations to be strengthened: "If the UN ceases to be regarded by the larger powers as an institution to secure the peace of the world and justice therein, then that holds out all sorts of potential dangers." On 27 May 2009 Heffer threatened to stand as an independent against Sir Alan Haselhurst, his local Conservative MP and a deputy speaker, unless Haselhurst paid back the £12,000 he claimed for work on his garden, as revealed in the Parliamentary expenses scandal. A month later Haselhurst announced that he would pay the £12,000 back, while insisting that it had been claimed within the rules.

In 2010 Heffer criticised the then Prime Minister, David Cameron, and modernising elements within the Conservative Party.

Heffer has written sympathetically about and backed the United Kingdom Independence Party (UKIP) and Nigel Farage. He supported the UK's withdrawal from the EU in the Brexit referendum. In an article in the Daily Telegraph Heffer suggested that some of those who supported Britain remaining in the European Union were members of the Bilderberg Group and attendees of the World Economic Forum at Davos. From 2016 to 2019, he was part of the political advisory board of Leave Means Leave.

On 10 December 2025, as part of the 2025 Political Peerages, he was announced as one of three Conservative nominees to the House of Lords as a life peer; he was created as Baron Blackwater, of Great and Little Leighs in the County of Essex, on 27 January 2026.

== Personal life ==
In 1987, Heffer married Diana Caroline, daughter of Squadron Leader P. A. Clee, of Marlow, Buckinghamshire. He has two children and lives in Great Leighs, near Chelmsford. He is a director of the London Chorus (London Choral Society) and was previously director of the Elgar Foundation.

== Bibliography ==
=== Books ===
==== Author ====
- The Daily Telegraph Century of County Cricket: The 100 Best Matches (Sidgwick & Jackson, London, 1990) ISBN 0283060484
- Moral Desperado: A Life of Thomas Carlyle (London: Weidenfeld & Nicolson, 1995) ISBN 978-0297815648
- Power and Place: The Political Consequences of King Edward VII (London: Weidenfeld & Nicolson, 1998) ISBN 978-0297842200
- Like the Roman: The Life of Enoch Powell (London: Weidenfeld & Nicolson, 1998) ISBN 0-297-84286-2
- Nor Shall My Sword: The Reinvention of England (London: Orion, 1999) ISBN 978-0297643326
- Vaughan Williams, (London, 2000) ISBN 0-297-64398-3
- Great British speeches (London: Quercus, 2007) ISBN 0857383272
- The Daily Telegraph Style Guide (London: Aurum, 2010) ISBN 1845135717
- Strictly English: The Correct Way to Write... and Why it Matters (London: RH Books, 2010) ISBN 978-1-84794-630-0
- A Short History of Power (London: Notting Hill Editions, 2011) ISBN 1907903208
- High minds: the Victorians and the birth of modern Britain. London: RH Books. 2013. ISBN 9780099558477
- Simply English (London:RH Books, 2014) ISBN 0099558467
- The Age of Decadence: Britain 1880 to 1914 (London: Random House, 2017) ISBN 978-1-84794-742-0
- Staring at God: Britain in the Great War (London: Random House, 2019) ISBN 978-184794-831-1
- Sing As We Go : Britain Between the Wars (London: Hutchinson Heinemann, 2023) ISBN 152915264X
- Scarcely English: An A to Z of Assaults on Our Language (London: Hutchinson Heinemann, 2024) ISBN 978-1529152791

==== Editor ====
- Heffer, Simon, with Moore, Charles, A Tory Seer: The Selected Journalism of T. E. Utley (London, 1989) ISBN 0-241-12728-9
- Heffer, Simon, Henry 'Chips' Channon, The Diaries: 1943-57, (3 volumes) (Cornerstone, 2022) ISBN 978-1529-1517-25

=== Book reviews ===
Year	Review article	Work(s) reviewed
2014	Heffer, Simon (21 November 2014). "The Unfinished Battles of Waterloo". New Statesman. 143 (5237): 44–45.	Cornwell, Bernard (2014). Waterloo: The History of Four Days, Three Armies and Three Battles. London: William Collins.; Kershaw, Robert. 24 Hours at Waterloo: 18 June 1815. W. H. Allen.; O'Keeffe, Paul. Waterloo: The Aftermath. Bodley Head.; Clayton, Tim. Waterloo: Four Days that Changed Europe's Destiny. Little, Brown.; Simms, Brendan (2014). The Longest Afternoon: The Four Hundred Men Who Decided the Battle of Waterloo. Allen Lane.

=== Critical studies and reviews of Heffer's work ===
High minds

- Best, Geoffrey (November 2013). "The Victorians and the Birth of Modern Britain – A Review of High minds". Reviews. History Today. 63 (11): 65.

== See also ==
- List of newspaper columnists

Media offices
Preceded by Trevor Grove and Veronica Wadley	Deputy Editor of The Daily Telegraph; 1994–1995; With: Veronica Wadley	Succeeded by Sarah Sands
