= Trevor Grove =

British journalist and former editor (born 1945)

Trevor Grove (born 1 January 1945) is a British journalist and former editor of The Sunday Telegraph (1989–1992).

Raised and educated in Buenos Aires, Argentina, where he was educated at St. George's College, Quilmes, Grove was appointed editor of The Sunday Telegraph on 3 October 1989 under Max Hastings, then editor-in-chief of both the daily and Sunday titles. Unusually, the previous editor, Peregrine Worsthorne, was not removed from the newspaper, but instead was retained as editor of the comment section. This prompted the emergence of factionalism on the newspaper, which made Grove's position difficult. He was eventually succeeded in 1992, after less than three years in the post, by Charles Moore. Grove subsequently moved back to Argentina to launch El Periodico de Tucuman. In 2004 he was the director of Inside Time, the national publication for UK prisoners.

He has also written a number of books, including The Juryman's Tale (1998), a defence of the jury system, and One Dog and His Man about his relationship with his Dalmatian dog.

He is married to the columnist and interviewer Valerie Grove. He is also a magistrate. In Who's Who he gives his recreations as "playing tennis, messing about in a boat, learning the tango, walking the dog".

Media offices
Preceded by Charles Moore	Deputy Editor of The Daily Telegraph; 1992–1994; With: Veronica Wadley	Succeeded by Simon Heffer and Veronica Wadley
Preceded by Peregrine Worsthorne	Editor of The Sunday Telegraph; 1989–1992	Succeeded by Charles Moore
