= Like the Roman =

1998 book by Simon Heffer

Like the Roman: The Life of Enoch Powell
- Enoch Powell by Allan Warren
- Author: Simon Heffer
- Language: English
- Publisher: Weidenfeld & Nicolson
- Publication date: 1998
- Publication place: United Kingdom
- Pages: 1,024
- ISBN: 978-0-297-84286-6

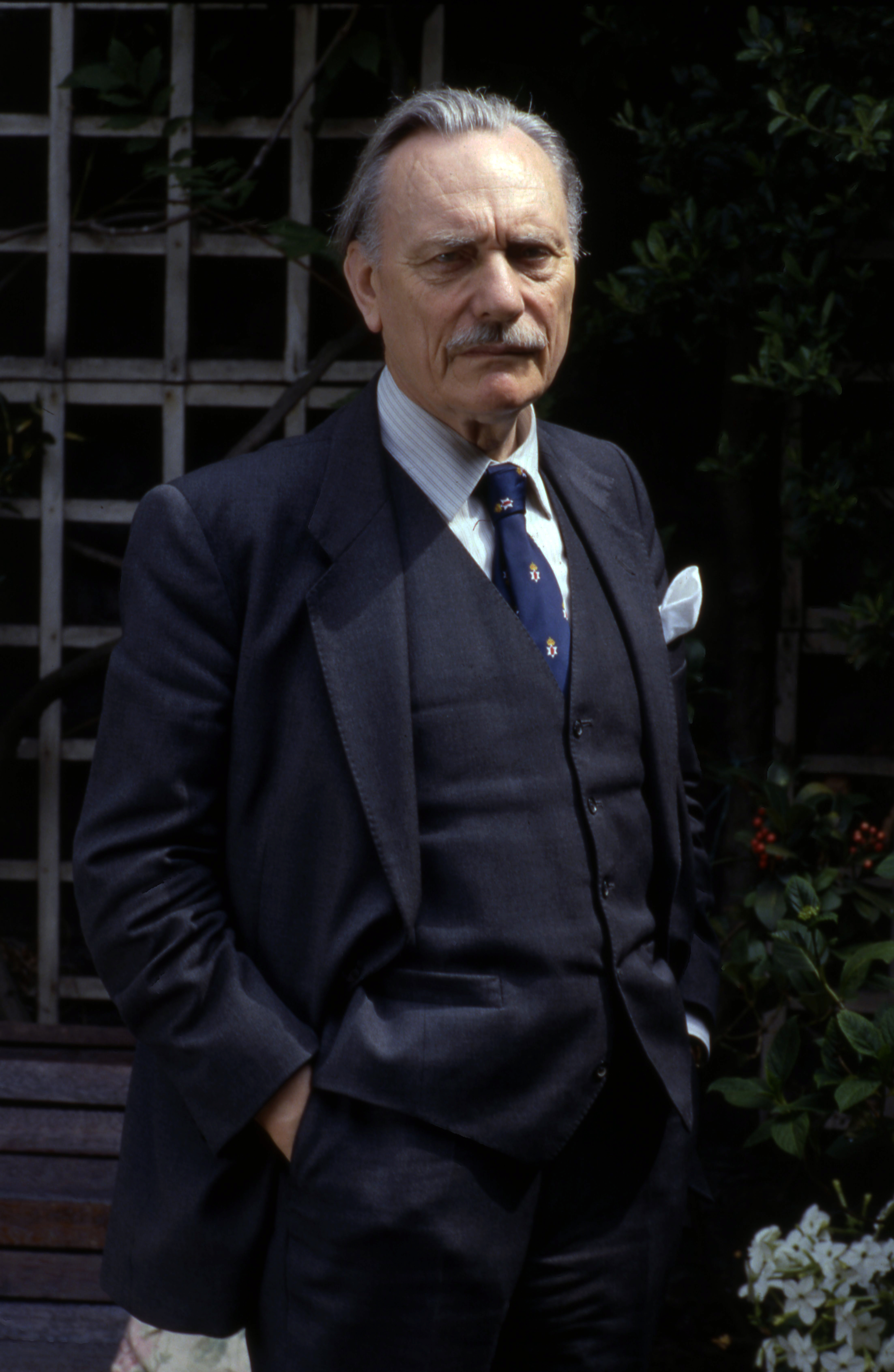
Enoch Powell

Like the Roman: The Life of Enoch Powell is a 1998 book by the English writer Simon Heffer. It is a biography of the politician Enoch Powell. The title is taken from Powell's 1968 Rivers of Blood speech when Powell quoted Virgil's Aeneid: "As I look ahead, I am filled with foreboding; like the Roman, I seem to see the River Tiber foaming with much blood".

== Reception ==
Ian Aitken reviewed the book in the New Statesman: "At 1,024 pages, it would have benefited from some judicious cutting. But for all its length, it is never tedious. Heffer writes with the same lucidity as his subject, but happily without Powell's corkscrew-like sentence construction." In 2014, Sathnam Sanghera selected Like the Roman as one of the "top 10 books of the Midlands" for an article in The Guardian. Sanghera wrote: "Powell remains a highly controversial figure, but if you want to understand the story of postwar immigration in Britain, and, arguably, postwar British politics at large, you need to read this book."

In 2020, Mark Gilbert described the author and book as “being openly sympathetic to Powell’s views, and excessively inclined to recount in detail every speech and article that Powell ever made—and he made a lot—is nevertheless the best rightwing conservative narrative of postwar British politics that I know.”

The book was shortlisted for the 1999 Political Book of the Year and the 1999 Channel 4 Political Book of the Year Award.
