= John Bryant (journalist) =

British journalist (1944–2020)

- Born: John William Bryant; April 25, 1944; Haselbury Plucknett, Somerset, England
- Died: 30 April 2020 (aged 76); Surrey, England
- Education: Sexey's School; Queen's College, Oxford
- Employer(s): Daily Mail; The Times; The Daily Telegraph; The Sunday Correspondent; The European
- Children: 2

John William Bryant (25 April 1944 – 30 April 2020) was a British journalist with interests in marathons. He was the editor of The Daily Telegraph from 2005 to 2007, and also served as editor of The European, editor of The Sunday Correspondent, deputy editor of The Times and executive editor of the Daily Mail. He helped establish the London Marathon, with Chris Brasher.

== Early and personal life ==
Bryant was born on 25 April 1944 and grew up in the village of Haselbury Plunknett in Somerset. He attended Sexey's School in Bruton. He studied law at Queen's College, Oxford where he was an Oxford Blue.

Bryant was described as a reluctant interviewee, and quietly spoken, by those around him. He resided in Kingston upon Thames.

== Athletics career ==
Bryant was a county running champion and since then entered coaching – he coached, among others, Olympic athlete Zola Budd, accompanying her to the 1984 Olympics. In the 1950s, he was closely involved with major players in achieving the four-minute mile, and developed a relationship with Roger Bannister.

After forming a friendship with the track and field athlete Chris Brasher, Bryant played a part in developing the modern-day London Marathon. He completed his 24th marathon in April 2016, and thanked his team at a reception held near Tower Bridge at the end of the run. By the end of his life he had participated in 29 London Marathons in total.

Bryant was a long-time captain of the world's oldest cross-country running club, the Thames Hare and Hounds.

== Journalism career ==
Bryant began his journalism career at the Edinburgh Evening News.

He was executive editor of the Daily Mail in the 1980s, and consultant editor and features editor, before joining The Times as their managing editor in 1986, where he wrote a regular column on sport. He was promoted to deputy editor, a role he returned to after editing The Sunday Correspondent and The European.

On 18 November 2005, Martin Newland resigned as editor of The Daily Telegraph, and the Telegraph Media Group immediately hired Bryant. Despite overseeing the paper's move to new offices in Victoria, London, his tenure as editor came with an era of unexpected turbulence, where journalists were at the forefront of a number of redundancies and resignations, including 54 editorial redundancies at The Telegraph in 2006. At the same time, it was reported that Bryant was in a 'power struggle' with the then Sunday Telegraph editor Sarah Sands. It was announced that Bryant was leaving The Telegraph in late 2006, and he said he had had "a great time" among the paper's journalists and writers. In October 2006, William Lewis took over Bryant's role unofficially until Bryant's official leaving the editorship the following year.

Since his leaving The Daily Telegraph, Bryant wrote a number of books and articles with sporting and marathon backgrounds, including a piece in The Guardian about Roger Bannister's four-minute mile in 1954. He became chair of the Press Association Trust in 2008.

== Death ==
Bryant died on 30 April 2020, aged 76, at his home in Surrey, following a "long illness". He was survived by his wife, two sons and six grandchildren.

== Bibliography ==
- 3:59.4, Penguin Books, 2005, ISBN 978-0099469087
- The London Marathon, Penguin Books, 2006, ISBN 978-0099484356

Media offices
Preceded by Martin Newland	Editor of The Daily Telegraph; 2005–2007	Succeeded by William Lewis
Preceded by Ian Watson	Editor of The European; 1991–1992	Succeeded by Charles Garside
