= Veronica Wadley, Baroness Fleet =

British newspaper editor (born 1952)

The Right Honourable The Baroness Fleet CBE

Member of the House of Lords
- Lord Temporal
- Life peerage 15 September 2020

Personal details
- Born: Veronica Judith Colleton Wadley; 28 February 1952 (age 74) Chelsea, London, England
- Citizenship: United Kingdom
- Party: Conservative
- Spouse: Tom Bower (m. 1985)
- Children: 2

Veronica Judith Colleton Wadley, Baroness Fleet, CBE (born 28 February 1952) is a board member of Arts Council England (2010–present). She is a director and trustee of the Associated Board of the Royal Schools of Music. She was a senior advisor to the former Mayor of London, Boris Johnson (2012–2016) and the co-founder and chairman of the London Music Fund (formerly the Mayor's Fund for Young Musicians), where she remains a Trustee & Chair. She is also a non-executive director of the Berkeley Group and an independent Director of Times Newspapers Holdings.

Prior to this, she was the editor of the Evening Standard (2002–2009) and previously deputy editor of The Daily Telegraph.

== Early life and career ==
Wadley was born in Chelsea to Lieutenant Colonel Neville Pierce Wadley, MC, and Anne, daughter of Lieutenant Colonel Arthur Hautayne Bowring, Royal Field Artillery, of a landed gentry family of Larkbeare, Exeter descended from Sir John Bowring, fourth Governor of Hong Kong. Anne's maternal grandfather was Sir Robert Colleton, 9th Baronet.

She was educated at the independent Francis Holland School in central London and at Benenden School in Kent. She was employed by Condé Nast (1971–74), working on Vogue, before travelling to South Africa where she worked as a journalist for three years. She subsequently joined The Daily Telegraph colour magazine (1978–81) and The Mail on Sunday for five years before rejoining The Daily Telegraph in 1986 remaining there until 1996, being appointed deputy editor in 1994. She has also worked on the Daily Mail as deputy editor and features editor (1996–2002).

== Editor of the Evening Standard ==
A journalist, Wadley was editor of London's Evening Standard from February 2002 to February 2009, during which time it was owned by Associated Newspapers. She was the first female editor of the paper. During her seven years at the Standard, she championed the arts and chaired the Evening Standard Theatre awards and Film awards. After Alexander Lebedev acquired the Standard in 2009, he replaced her with former Tatler editor Geordie Greig.

The newspaper was particularly critical of the then London Mayor, Ken Livingstone. This came to a head in the run-up to the 2008 London mayoral election, in which Wadley's newspaper attacked Livingstone's record. According to articles in The Guardian and Time Out London, she was strongly influenced by the need to renew Associated Newspaper's multimillion-pound contract to deliver the Metro free paper in London Underground stations in 2010, a decision within the gift of the Mayor. A few months after Wadley left the Standard, the publication launched its "Sorry" promotion. "London is laughing at this ludicrous campaign", she said. The Guardian reported, "The market research evidently discovered that Londoners considered the Standard to be too negative."

== Subsequent career ==
As chair of Arts Council London, Wadley acts as an advocate and ambassador for the Arts Council to champion, support and develop art and culture across the city. Arts Council London supports a range of activities across the arts, museums and libraries – from theatre to dance, music, literature and art and oversees the budget for London. Wadley was appointed in 2012 as a senior advisor to the Mayor of London, Boris Johnson, advising on the Olympic Legacy and was instrumental in setting up Team London which won European Volunteering Capital 2016 for its work with young people. She oversaw the delivery of youth volunteering and employment programmes and co-ordinated the Mayor's relationship with London's diverse charities. She also developed a new strategy for business relationships and sponsorship for the Greater London Authority.

Wadley has been heavily involved in promoting and supporting music and the arts in London. She has also been involved in raising funds for several charities. She is a Founder Trustee of the London Music Fund (formerly the Mayor of London's Fund for Young Musicians, an independent charity supporting music education for children from low income families in London) and was its chair from 2012 to 2016. She is also a Governor of the Yehudi Menuhin School (2012–present). The school develops the musical potential of exceptionally gifted young musicians. Since 2009, she has been an advisor at Greenhouse Sports. Greenhouse is a charity set up in 2002 to provide sports programmes for London secondary schools and academies in areas of high unemployment. She was a member of the GLA Music Education Advisory Board (2010–2016) which helped promote music education in London. She chaired a panel that examined a National Plan for Music Education, which was due to be released in 2022.

Previously she was a trustee of Northern Ballet (2009–2013) and advisory board member of Arts and Business (2009–2012) and conference chair of Editorial Intelligence (2009–2010).

She was appointed a CBE for services to the arts in the 2018 New Year's Honours. She was nominated for a life peerage in the 2020 Political Honours and was created Baroness Fleet on 15 September. She made her maiden speech on 26 May 2021.

== Personal life ==
Veronica Wadley has been married to the investigative journalist Tom Bower since 1985. The couple have two children. She also has two stepsons from her husband's first marriage.

== Notes and references ==
Media offices
Preceded by Charles Moore	Deputy Editor of The Daily Telegraph with Trevor Grove (1992–1994); Simon Heffer (1994–1995); 1992–1995	Succeeded by Sarah Sands
Preceded by Sir Max Hastings	Editor of The Evening Standard; 2002–2009	Succeeded by Geordie Greig
