= Peregrine Worsthorne =

British journalist, writer and broadcaster (1923–2020)

Sir Peregrine Worsthorne
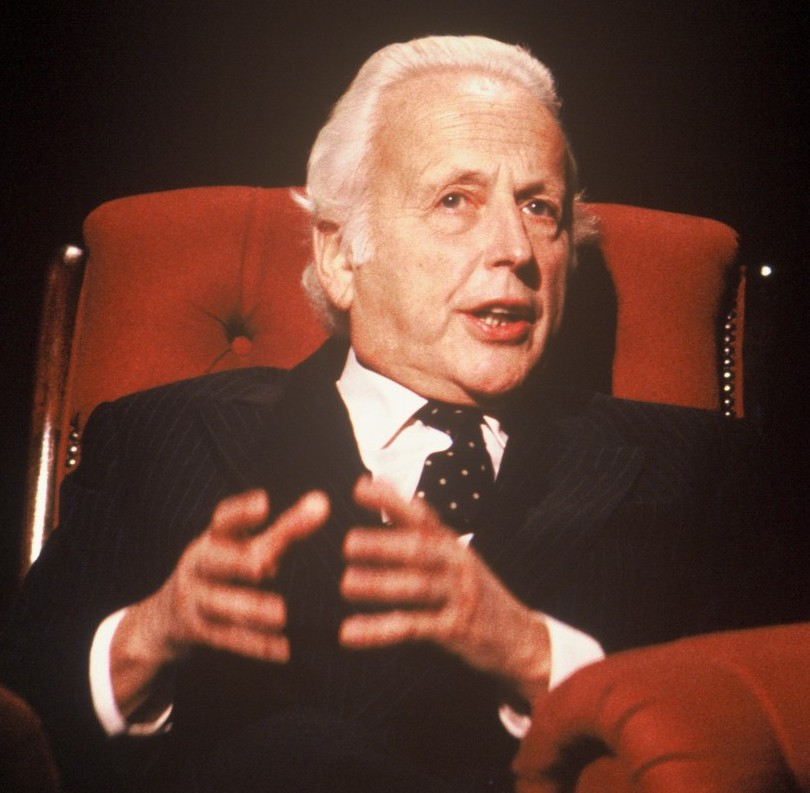
- On the TV programme After Dark in 1989
- Born: Peregrine Gerard Worsthorne; 22 December 1923; London, England
- Died: 4 October 2020 (aged 96); Hedgerley, Buckinghamshire, England
- Education: Stowe School: Peterhouse, Cambridge; Magdalen College, Oxford
- Occupations: Journalist; writer; broadcaster
- Spouses: Claudie Baynham (m. 1950; died 1990); Lucinda Lambton (m. 1991)
- Children: 1
- Mother: Priscilla Reyntiens
- Family: Simon Towneley (brother)
- Military career
- Branch: British Army
- Service years: 1943–1945
- Rank: Second lieutenant
- Service number: 278628
- Units: Oxfordshire and Buckinghamshire Light Infantry; GHQ Liaison Regiment

Sir Peregrine Gerard Worsthorne (22 December 1923 – 4 October 2020) was a British journalist, writer, and broadcaster. He spent the largest part of his career at the Telegraph newspaper titles, eventually becoming editor of The Sunday Telegraph for several years. He left the newspaper in 1997.

Worsthorne was a conservative-leaning political journalist, who wrote columns and leaders for many years.

== Early life, school and military service ==
Worsthorne was born at Cadogan Square in Knightsbridge, London, the younger son of General Alexander Louis Koch Worsthorne (né de Gooreynd), a Belgian banker who had served his country in World War I, and Priscilla Reyntiens, an English Roman Catholic and the granddaughter of the 12th Earl of Abingdon. The family name was anglicised following the birth of Worsthorne's older brother Simon Towneley, who from 1976 to 1996 was the Lord Lieutenant of Lancashire. The two boys were baptised Roman Catholic, but mostly did not attend Catholic denominational schools.

Worsthorne's mother divorced his father when he was five years old, and shortly afterwards married Sir Montagu Norman, then the Governor of the Bank of England. As a consequence of the split, the family butler all but raised the two brothers for several years. "Unhappy as some of my formative experiences were, all in all, it was pretty good soil for someone wanting to go into public life", he recalled, commenting on the tradition of public duty and service so prevalent in his family and his family's social circle. Worsthorne's biological father reverted his name to Koch de Gooreynd in 1937 and lived in Rhodesia for several years; Worsthorne discovered in the early 1960s that a half-brother was born during this period.

Worsthorne was educated at Stowe School, where, he wrote, he was once seduced on the art room chaise-longue by George Melly, a fellow pupil who was later a jazz singer and writer; Melly always denied it happened. One other pupil, Colin Welch, became a lifelong friend. Welch also had a career in journalism, and persuaded Worsthorne to apply to Peterhouse, Cambridge. He began his studies at the college in 1942, having won an exhibition to read history. The Master of Peterhouse at that time was the Conservative academic Herbert Butterfield. As was normal practice Worsthorne was called up for war service after three terms; he was rusticated during the last term. In army training with the Oxfordshire and Buckinghamshire Light Infantry, he injured his shoulder and after being admitted to a hospital in Oxford was able to persuade Magdalen College, Oxford, to admit him for a term.

After receiving his commission on 4 June 1943, Worsthorne saw service in GHQ Liaison Regiment (Phantom) during the Italian campaign with the philosopher Michael Oakeshott and was part of the occupying force in Hamburg for three months in 1945. Worsthorne returned to Peterhouse and took his degree a year early, gaining a second.

== Early career in journalism ==
Worsthorne entered the newspaper industry as a sub-editor on The Glasgow Herald in 1946, on a two-year training programme for Oxbridge graduates. He then worked for The Times from 1948 on the Foreign Desk, again as a sub-editor in his first year there. During this time he was called into the office of the newspaper's editor William Casey, who then told him: "Dear Boy, The Times is a stable of hacks and a thoroughbred like you will never be at home here".

He became a correspondent in Washington (1950–52), where his advocacy of Senator Joe McCarthy's pursuit of communist subversion in the United States government eventually led to a split with the more circumspect Times and in 1953, he joined The Daily Telegraph. Despite moving to a newspaper more suited to his politics, Worsthorne left The Times with some regret, feeling that working for any other title in Fleet Street could only be anticlimactic and that working conditions at The Telegraph were inferior to those at The Times, then based at Printing House Square. At this time he also contributed articles to the magazine Encounter (covertly funded by the CIA).

In a November 1954 article discussing McCarthyism titled "America: Conscience or Shield?", he wrote that America's flaws were something the British would have to accept for their own benefit, because "legend created an American god. The god has failed. But unlike the Communist god which, on closer examination, turned out to be a devil, the American god has just become human". Later he favourably compared a post-war America which "put its faith in the [intellectual elites]" over a Britain dedicated to the "masses".

== At The Sunday Telegraph ==
=== Deputy editor (1961–76) ===
In 1961 Worsthorne was appointed as the first deputy editor of The Sunday Telegraph; a job with fewer responsibilities than its title implies, and in his autobiography Worsthorne expressed some regret that he rejected an offer to become editor of The Yorkshire Post. In due course though, he became a leading columnist on his newspaper, taking a Conservative High Tory stance.

Worsthorne mourned the loss of the British Empire; he once argued that the public's acceptance of decolonisation was paralleled by their acquiescence to socialism. Of the Six-Day War in 1967 he wrote an article titled "Triumph of the Civilised",

"Last week a tiny Western community, surrounded by immensely superior numbers of the underdeveloped peoples, has shown itself able to impose its will on the Arabs today almost as effortlessly as the first whites were able to do on the Afro-Asian native in the imperial heyday".

The following year, after Enoch Powell's speech in April 1968 on the perceived threat of non-white immigration, he argued that voluntary repatriation was the "only honest course". In common with his friend the journalist Paul Johnson, he advocated the recolonisation of former colonies. In September 1991, he advocated "a new form of imperialism directed against the countries of the Third World" intended to create an "anti-barbarian alliance" to control the use of weapons by "primitive peoples." In his view nothing could be done about famines "without the advanced countries re-exerting political control – i.e., a return to colonialism."

In 1965, he defended the declaration of independence by the white minority government of Ian Smith in Rhodesia. Worsthorne, in an article on the Sunday following the declaration, wrote:

Just as in the light of history Lord North has been judged wrong for refusing to give independence to the white slave owners in America, so will Mr Harold Wilson be for refusing to give it to the white supremacists of Southern Africa.

Worsthorne initially accepted Britain's entry into the European Economic Community. After the publication of the Heath Government's 1971 White Paper, he wrote in a Daily Telegraph column that the "Europeans" deserved to win in the battle over British entry. "The sceptics have failed to produce an alternative faith", he argued. By the time of the imminent Single European Act of 1992, however, he wrote in The Sunday Telegraph of 4 August 1992 that: "Twenty years ago, when the process began, ... there was no question of losing sovereignty. That was a lie, or at any rate, a dishonest obfuscation", in contradiction of the Treaty of Rome's commitment (1957) to an "ever closer union".

On the BBC's Nationwide programme in March 1973, he was the second person on the nation's television to say "fuck", when asked if the general public were concerned that a Conservative Government minister Lord Lambton (his future father-in-law) had shared a bed with two call girls. Worsthorne said in 2013 that "There's a possibility it wasn't spontaneous. Apparently I took advice about it before in El Vino's. I don't remember. To the best of my knowledge, it was the mot juste." Swearing on television cost him the opportunity to edit The Daily Telegraph, as its owner, Lord Hartwell, strongly objected to Worsthorne's comment and was persuaded to bar him from appearing on television for six months. Worsthorne was promoted to associate editor in 1976.

=== Associate editor (1976–86) ===
Worsthorne argued in 1978 that the possible advance of "socialism" created an "urgent need ... for the state to regain control over 'the people', to re-exert its authority ..." in the context of Britain "being allowed to spin into chaos". He was critical of Margaret Thatcher's connection of domestic socialism with the form in the Eastern Bloc as he did not perceive this as being in line with the experiences of most of the population (the "untalented majority"). He saw "the needs and values of the strong" as something which "should obsess the popular imagination" of "all healthy societies". He defended the conduct of Pinochet's forces in the 1973 Chilean coup, and wrote that he hoped the British army would launch a coup in Britain if a radical minority socialist government should ever enter power.

In 1978 Worsthorne did not see the potential for elements of his views (the end of socialism as an alternative in Britain) to be reflected in the forthcoming change of government (in what the political scientist Andrew Gamble came to call "the free economy and the strong state"). In the year before Thatcher's election he wrote that her government "is not going to make all that much difference [...] Her proposals amount in effect to very little: a controlled experiment in using market methods to improve the workings of social democracy". "We put too much emphasis on Mrs. Thatcher forming a government", Worsthorne said on the BBC's election night programme late on 3 May 1979 as the results were about to come in. "It will really be Conservative ideas and Conservative policies that have formed a government. I don't think that she's articulated it very well." He wrote an article "When Treason Can Be Right" in the Sunday Telegraph on 4 November 1979, in which he said that he would accept a request to work with the CIA to undermine a Labour Government in the UK. A quote from this article appears in some copies of the novel A Very British Coup, in which the main conspirator is named Sir Peregrine.

=== Editor and later responsibilities (1986–91) ===
After Conrad Black's holding company gained 80 per cent of the company stock in 1986, Worsthorne was finally able to become editor of The Sunday Telegraph, though in the end only for three years. In 1989 the Telegraph titles briefly became a seven-day operation under Max Hastings, with the bulk of The Sunday Telegraph edited by Trevor Grove. Worsthorne's responsibilities were reduced to the three comment pages by the editor-in-chief Andrew Knight, who sacked Worsthorne as editor over lunch in Claridge's. The lofty ethos of the comment pages, with contributors including Bruce Anderson, was captured in their nickname, 'Worsthorne College'. This arrangement continued until September 1991 when Worsthorne's commitments were reduced to his weekly column.

In January 1990, Worsthorne was the defendant in a libel case brought by Andrew Neil and The Sunday Times, over a March 1989 editorial "Playboys as Editors" in The Sunday Telegraph which claimed that as a result of Neil's involvement with Pamella Bordes, he and The Observer's Donald Trelford (also involved with Bordes) should not serve as editors of their titles. (The Independent on Sunday, the other British quality Sunday, did not begin publication until January 1990.) The Sunday Telegraph had accused Neil of knowing that Bordes was a prostitute, which according to Roy Greenslade, he certainly did not know, a fact which the Telegraph had accepted by the time of the court case, but still defended the two articles (one was not by Worsthorne) as fair comment. Neil won the defamation case, being awarded damages of £1,000 and his paper won its then cover price of 60p. Earlier, in March 1988, Worsthorne had said Neil was a "brilliant editor", according to an entry in the diary of his friend Woodrow Wyatt. "The job of journalism is not to be scholarly", Worsthorne commented in 1989. "The most that can be achieved by an individual newspaper or journalist is the articulation of an intelligent, well-thought-out, coherent set of prejudices – ie, a moral position." Worsthorne received a knighthood in the 1991 New Year Honours for services to journalism.

== Views concerning homosexuality ==
Worsthorne long criticised homosexual activity, castigating Roy Jenkins in particular in a 1982 editorial for his tolerance of "queers". At the time of the debate over Section 28 in January 1988 he appeared on Third Ear a Radio 3 programme and persistently referred to gay men as "them", which caused the other interviewee, Ian McKellen, to come out by saying, "I'm one of them myself". Worsthorne also said on the programme that not being gay was "a close-run thing" for some of his contemporaries. In a 2011 article for the London Evening Standard, in reference to the 1930s, Worsthorne said "I think more boys would have gone gay if there hadn't been such a price to pay for it".

He later accepted the possibility of same-sex marriages, believing they allow gay people to form "stable relationships" and argued that Conservatives should embrace political correctness as a form of modern courtesy. Worsthorne also claimed to have been seduced by jazz musician George Melly.

== Later life and career ==
In 1993, Worsthorne criticised the legacy of Margaret Thatcher's government; during the 1980s, his ambivalence to what he saw as her "bourgeois triumphalism" resulted in Worsthorne and the Telegraph being out of favour at 10 Downing Street for some time. In 2005, he argued that Thatcher's "utterly un-Tory ideological excesses left such a bad taste in the mouth of the English people as to make Conservatism henceforth unpalatable, except as a last resort in the absence of a less dire alternative". He added "For many of our people, life in the late 20th and in the 21st Century will be repulsive, brutal, and short as well". His weekly article in The Sunday Telegraph was discontinued in 1997 during the editorship of Dominic Lawson, who said that Worsthorne's column had run its "natural lifespan". From that point, Worsthorne became critical of Conrad Black's wife, Barbara Amiel, and Black himself for his newspapers' uncritical support for Israel and the foreign policies of the United States.

In 1997, he criticised the "great and irreversible changes in society" and said of a changing Britain that "this is not a country I recognise or am particularly fond of any more". In 1999, Worsthorne said that only a federal Europe can stop the abolition of Britain, arguing that "the European Right (and Left for that matter) has no fear of the strong state, no hang-ups about individual liberty, which is why it is as willing to use the power of the state to curb the excesses of free speech and a free media, as of free enterprise or free trade". In the early 2000s, in reference to nuclear weapons and the possibility of nuclear war during the Cold War, he said "would some historian emerging centuries later from the post-thermonuclear war Dark Ages have judged (pressing the button) morally justified, or so evil as to dwarf even the most monstrous inequities of Hitler, Stalin and Mao? ... How could we have believed anything so preposterous?".

In 2004, Worsthorne released a book called In Defence of Aristocracy. In a speech at the Athenaeum Club on 19 June 2006, titled "Liberalism failed to set us free. Indeed, it enslaved us", he criticised liberalism and aspects of meritocracy; as well as the "liberal triumphalism" of the "West's victory in the Cold War left liberalism as the only ism still backed by a world superpower". In the 2000s he regularly contributed book reviews to the New Statesman, and was still a subscriber to the magazine in the 2010s. He told Jason Cowley of the New Statesman in a 2016 interview that "I've always thought the English aristocracy so marvellous compared to other ruling classes. It seemed to me that we had got a ruling class of such extraordinary historical excellence, which is rooted in England almost since the Norman Conquest." In his Athenaeum Club speech in 2006 he noted the emergence of David Cameron in a positive light, seeing in him "the return of the English gentleman". By December 2013, having met Cameron only once, he was more sceptical, "Cameron fits into that gentlemanly tradition but he's very embarrassed and awkward about it". Bruce Anderson observed of Worsthorne, "my dear friend and master", on his 90th birthday in December 2013, "Throughout his career, Perry defended conventions, while also defying them".

== Private life and death ==
In 1950, Worsthorne married Claudie Bertrande Baynham (née de Colasse), with whom he had a daughter (Dominique) and stepson (David Anthony Lloyd Baynham). Claudie died in 1990. In 1991, Worsthorne married the architectural writer Lucinda Lambton. A portrait of the couple, by Denis Waugh, is in the collection of the National Portrait Gallery, London. The couple lived in Hedgerley, Buckinghamshire. Worsthorne publicly advocated for Lambton and her sisters to inherit properties and fortunes from their father.

Worsthorne died at home on 4 October 2020, at the age of 96.

== Sources ==
- Andy Beckett (2002), Pinochet in Piccadilly: Britain and Chile's Hidden History , Faber
- David Cannadine (1998 [2000(3)]), Class in Britain, Yale University Press [Penguin]
- Roy Greenslade (2003 [2004]), Press Gang: How Newspapers Make Profits from Propaganda, Pan (originally Macmillan)
- Ted Honderich (1990 [1991]), Conservatism, Hamish Hamilton [Penguin]
- Frances Stonor Saunders (1999 [2000]), Who Paid the Piper: The CIA and the Cultural Cold War, Granta (US edition: The Cultural Cold War: The CIA and the World of Arts and Letters, 2000, The New Press)
- Peregrine Worsthorne (1977), "Boy Made Man", in George MacDonald Fraser (ed.), The World of the Public School (pp. 79–96), London: Weidenfeld & Nicolson/St Martins Press (US edition)
- Peregrine Worsthorne (1978), "Too Much Freedom", in Maurice Cowling (ed) Conservative Essays, Cassell
- Peregrine Worsthorne (1993), Tricks of Memory: An Autobiography, Weidenfeld & Nicolson
- Peregrine Worsthorne (1999), "Dumbing Up" in Stephen Glover (ed.), Secrets of the Press: Journalists on Journalism Allen Lane pp. 115–24 [published in paperback as The Penguin Book of Journalism: Secrets of the Press Penguin, 2000]

== Other writings ==
- Mary Wilson (et al.) (1977), The Queen, Penguin [contributor]
- Peregrine Worsthorne (1958), Dare democracy disengage?, Conservative Political Centre [pamphlet]
- Peregrine Worsthorne (1971), The Socialist Myth, Cassell
- Peregrine Worsthorne (1973), Edwina Sandys, Crane Kalman Gallery [exhibition catalogue introduction]
- Peregrine Worsthorne (1980), Peregrinations: Selected pieces by Peregrine Worsthorne, Weidenfeld & Nicolson
- Peregrine Worsthorne (1987), By the Right, Brophy Educational [selections from his Sunday Telegraph columns]
- Peregrine Worsthorne (1988), The politics of manners and the uses of inequality: Autumn address, Centre for Policy Studies [pamphlet]
- Peregrine Worsthorne (2004), In Defence of Aristocracy HarperCollins [published in paperback as Democracy Needs Aristocracy Perennial 2005]

Media offices
Preceded by New position	Deputy Editor of The Sunday Telegraph; 1961–1976	Succeeded by Gordon Brook-Shepherd
Preceded by John Thompson	Editor of The Sunday Telegraph; 1986–1989	Succeeded by Trevor Grove
