= Valerie Grove =

British journalist and author (born 1946)

- Born: Valerie Smith; 11 May 1946 (age 80); South Shields, England
- Other name: Valerie Jenkins
- Education: Girton College, Cambridge
- Occupations: Journalist and author
- Notable credit(s): Evening Standard; The Sunday Times; The Times
- Spouse(s): David Byrnmor Jenkins (m. 1968) (div.) Trevor Grove (m. 1975)

Valerie Grove (née Smith, born 11 May 1946) is a British journalist and author, who worked for many years as a feature writer, interviewer and columnist for The Times newspaper.

== Biography ==
Grove was born in South Shields, England. Her father, William Douglas "Doug" Smith (1916–73), was a cartoonist for the Shields Gazette and other newspapers. Grove was an undergraduate at Girton College, Cambridge, from 1965, graduating from Cambridge University in 1968 with a degree in English. She joined the London Evening Standard in the year of her graduation, initially working on the "Londoner's Diary" column, then as a feature writer, eventually becoming the newspaper's literary editor for two spells (1979–81 and 1984–87). She left the Standard in 1987. After this, she wrote for The Sunday Times (1987–91) and The Times (1992–2014).

Grove's book The Compleat Woman: Marriage, Motherhood, Career – Can She Have it All? appeared in 1987. The volume contains interviews with prominent women of the time, married for at least 25 years and with three or more children.

Grove is a biographer of the writers Dodie Smith (1996), Laurie Lee (1999) and John Mortimer (2007). So Much To Tell, a biography of the children's book editor Kaye Webb, was published in May 2010.

Previously known professionally as Valerie Jenkins, she married David Byrnmor Jenkins in 1968, but the couple later divorced. (Her first book Where I Was Young – Memories of London Childhoods was published in 1976, under her former name.) In 1975, she married Trevor Grove, who is a former editor of The Sunday Telegraph.

== Bibliography ==
- Where I Was Young – Memories of London Childhoods (1975)
- The Compleat Woman: Marriage, Motherhood, Career – Can She Have it All? (1987)
- Dear Dodie (1996)
- Laurie Lee: The Well-Loved Stranger, (1999)
- A Voyage Round John Mortimer (2008)
- So Much To Tell (2010)
