= Charles Moore, Baron Moore of Etchingham =

English journalist and newspaper editor (born 1956)

The Right Honourable The Lord Moore of Etchingham
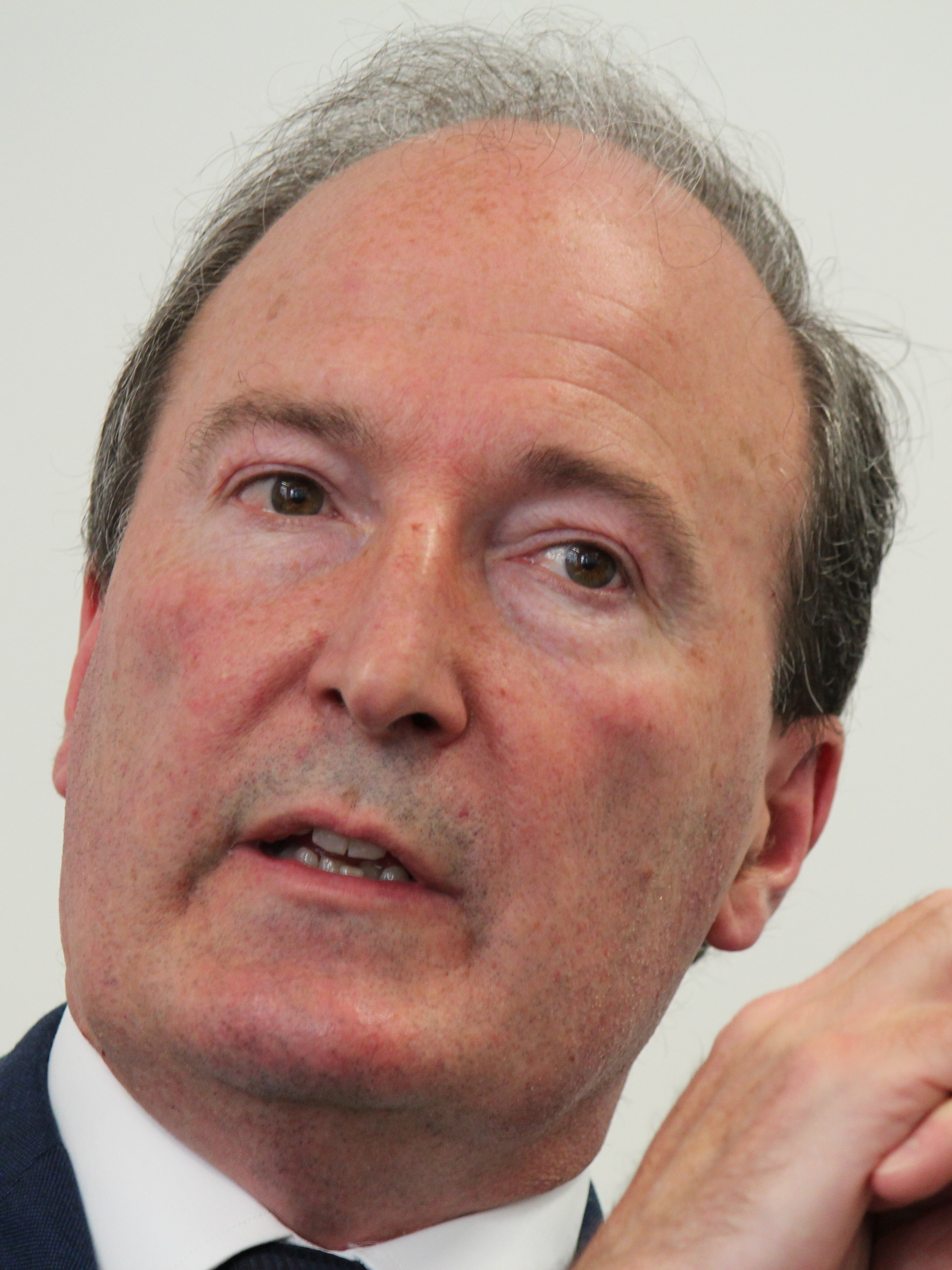
- Moore speaking at Policy Exchange in 2013

Member of the House of Lords
- Lord Temporal
- Life peerage 17 September 2020

Personal details
- Born: Charles Hilary Moore; 31 October 1956 (age 69) Hastings, Sussex, England
- Party: None (non-affiliated)
- Spouse: Caroline Baxter (m. 1981)
- Children: 2
- Education: Eton College
- Alma mater: Trinity College, Cambridge
- Occupation: Journalist
- Known for: Authorised biographer of Margaret Thatcher

Charles Hilary Moore, Baron Moore of Etchingham (born 31 October 1956) is an English journalist and the chairman of The Spectator. He is a former editor of The Daily Telegraph, The Spectator, and The Sunday Telegraph; he still writes for all three. He is known for his authorised biography of Margaret Thatcher, published in three volumes (2013, 2016 and 2019). Under the government of Boris Johnson, Moore was given a peerage in July 2020, thus becoming a member of the House of Lords.

== Early life ==
Moore was born in Hastings, East Sussex. He is from a Liberal family. His mother Ann (née Miles) was a county councillor for the Liberal Party in Sussex and his father Richard was a leader writer on the News Chronicle, who unsuccessfully stood for the party at several general elections.

While at Eton in 1974, Moore wrote about his membership of the Liberals in the Eton Chronicle and also about his taste for real ale. During this period he was already a friend of Oliver Letwin. Moore remained a Liberal into his early twenties.

Moore went to Trinity College, Cambridge, at the same time as Letwin. At Eton he had also known Nicholas Coleridge, who was also at Trinity. He read English (2.1) and History (2.1) and graduated BA in 1979. By now an advocate of architectural conservation, he became an admirer of the work in this field of Poet Laureate Sir John Betjeman.

== Early career ==
In 1979, Moore joined The Daily Telegraph as a political correspondent, and, after a short period on the "Peterborough" gossip column, was writing leaders within two years, by the age of 24. In 1982, Moore wrote a pamphlet for the Salisbury Group, titled The Old People of Lambeth (1982). In the aftermath of the 1981 Brixton riot (which Moore blamed on "poorly planned mass immigration"), Moore interviewed elderly white residents of Lambeth on their experience of crime, the police, immigration and politics. Moore wrote: "The native population of Lambeth feels little natural sympathy with the West Indian arrivals. Without having any arrogant or dogmatic theory of racial superiority, the old people of Lambeth can see with their own eyes that they are surrounded by people more primitive than they, who lack their respect for law and privacy". In the final paragraph, Moore wrote of the old people's loyalty to the Royal Family, their memories of the two world wars, their work ethic and their readiness to obey the law: "As one old man said simply, 'It's our country and our Queen. Why should we be afraid to go out?'"

In 1992 in an article questioning the success of the welfare policies intended to combat historical social problems, Moore supportively claimed there was a perception in America that some groups might be more able than others, which he then went on to support: "The Korean sets up the grocery store which the black then robs, that is the caricature that America recognises", and that there was a prejudice often voiced in conversation but hardly ever put into print "that there really is something different about blacks, or at least about young black men" and "If it is true, as it surely is that some races – the Jews are the obvious example – are highly enterprising and talented, it may also be true that some are the opposite."

In September 2003, Moore launched a new column, Beebwatch, that he claimed would "delve into the unconscious bias" of the corporation. "The BBC's mental assumptions are those of the fairly soft left, that American power is a bad thing, whereas the UN is good, that the Palestinians are in the right and Israel isn't, that the war in Iraq was wrong, that the European Union is a good thing and that people who criticise it are xenophobic," Moore said.

== As editor ==
=== The Spectator ===
Two years after joining The Spectator as a political columnist, Moore became the magazine's editor in 1984, remaining there until 1990.

Moore employed a young journalist Boris Johnson at The Spectator, who went on to succeed Moore as Editor of the Spectator and then became Mayor of London, Foreign Secretary and Prime Minister of the United Kingdom.

Moore co-edited A Tory Seer: The Selected Journalism of T. E. Utley, which was published in 1989.

=== Editor of the Sunday Telegraph ===
Following The Spectator, he edited The Sunday Telegraph from 1992 to 1995. Near the start of this period, around the time of the publication of the Andrew Morton book Diana: Her True Story, he appeared on Newsnight to discuss the marital difficulties of the Prince and Princess of Wales. To the astonishment of the presenter, Jeremy Paxman, Moore said that because he wished to protect the monarchy: "I believe in the importance of concealment in these matters and, if you like, hypocrisy."

=== Editor of the Daily Telegraph ===
Moore became editor of The Daily Telegraph in 1995. In 2001, his signed editorial "A Free Country" gained some notice elsewhere in the media. In this article, he argued in favour of hunting, pornography, the right to employ whom we choose, and the right to trial by jury, and advocated the legalisation of cannabis. He blamed a decline in "freedom" on the controls imposed during the Second World War and on Margaret Thatcher: "If you've been in office for a long time you always start to believe in having more power, and she undoubtedly got that disease."

==== False allegations against George Galloway ====
Owing to falling circulation, there had been speculation by 2003 about Moore's future prior to his resignation in the autumn of that year. Moore had been editor when stories about George Galloway, which led to a successful libel action from the politician, were published. The newspaper had falsely written that Galloway received payments from Saddam Hussein's regime.

== Later career ==
Since leaving the editorship of the Daily Telegraph in 2003, to spend more time writing Thatcher's authorised biography, Moore has penned regular columns at The Spectator and at the Daily Telegraph, and was named in 2023 by the New Statesman as the fortieth most influential right-wing figure in the UK.

=== Chairman of Policy Exchange (?-2011) ===
Moore was for a number of years chairman of Policy Exchange, a London-based think-tank, before he stepped down in June 2011. In December 2007 he entered the debate over The Hijacking of British Islam, a Policy Exchange report which the BBC had found to rely on evidence that was clearly fabricated. On 17 December 2007, The Times issued an apology to Dr Muhammad Abdul Bari of the East London Mosque in connection with its coverage of the report originally defended by Moore.

Policy Exchange did not bring its threatened legal action against the BBC but in September 2008, the Finsbury Park Mosque issued a writ in the High Court over the report's allegations. In March 2009, the report appeared to have been removed from the Policy Exchange website, and a correction notice was published. The case came to the High Court in December 2009 but was struck out by the Judge on the basis that the Mosque could not sue for defamation as it was not a corporate entity or legal person.

== Peerage ==
On 31 July 2020, Moore was given a life peerage alongside other prominent Brexiters Claire Fox, Kate Hoey, Gisela Stuart, Frank Field and Ian Botham. He took his seat in the House of Lords on 17 September 2020, and sits as a non-affiliated member. He made his maiden speech on 23 February 2022.

== Publications ==
=== Biographer of Margaret Thatcher ===
Following the death of Margaret Thatcher on 8 April 2013, during his appearance on the Question Time programme three days later, Moore criticised the BBC for giving too much publicity to the Thatcher critics who were celebrating her death. Menzies Campbell accused Moore of suffering from "a persecution complex". On 17 April, the day of Thatcher's funeral, Moore said that parts of the country showing enmity were considered "relatively less important".

Moore left his post as editor of The Daily Telegraph in 2003 to spend more time writing Thatcher's authorised biography. Always intended to be published after her death, the first volume, titled Not For Turning, was published in 2013 shortly after her funeral. (The US edition of this initial volume was retitled Margaret Thatcher, The Authorized Biography: From Grantham to the Falklands.) Moore does not know exactly why he was chosen to write the biography, but believes it was probably because of his age, and because he was familiar with all the main characters of Thatcher's time in government, without being especially strongly linked to any one of them. He was selected by Thatcher, without his prior knowledge, out of a list of names which were presented to her.

The first volume of Moore's three-volume work received the £5,000 Elizabeth Longford Prize in 2014.

- Moore, Charles; Simon Heffer (1989). A Tory Seer: The Selected Journalism of T. E. Utley. Foreword by Margaret Thatcher; Introduction by Enoch Powell. London: Hamish Hamilton. ISBN 9780241127285.
- Moore, Charles (2013). Margaret Thatcher: The Authorised Biography, Volume One: Not for Turning. London: Allen Lane. ISBN 9780713992823.
  - — (2013). Margaret Thatcher: The Authorized Biography [Volume 1]: From Grantham to the Falklands. U.S. edition/title. New York: Alfred A. Knopf. ISBN 9780307958945.
- Moore, Charles (2015). Margaret Thatcher: The Authorised Biography, Volume Two: Everything She Wants. London: Allen Lane. ISBN 9780713992885.
  - — (2016). Margaret Thatcher: The Authorized Biography [Volume 2]: At Her Zenith: In London, Washington, and Moscow. U.S. edition/title. New York: Alfred A. Knopf. ISBN 9780307958969.
- Moore, Charles (2019). Margaret Thatcher: The Authorised Biography, Volume Three: Herself Alone. London: Allen Lane. ISBN 9780241324745.
  - — (2019). Margaret Thatcher: The Authorized Biography [Volume 3]: Herself Alone. U.S. edition/title. New York: Alfred A. Knopf. ISBN 9781101947203.

== Personal life ==
Moore married Caroline Baxter (whom he had met at university) in 1981 in Tunbridge Wells. The couple have two children.

Moore converted to Roman Catholicism following the Church of England's decision to allow the ordination of women as priests in 1992. His wife, a former English don at Peterhouse, Cambridge, chose not to make such a move, and remains an Anglican.

Moore is the founder-chairman of The Rectory Society, which is dedicated to preserving past and present parsonages. Moore is also a patron of the Latin Mass Society of England and Wales.

== Views ==
Moore is a monarchist, and says the monarchy "reaches parts politics cannot reach". He supported Brexit, and has criticised the BBC's Brexit and climate change coverage. In The Spectator in 2018 he wrote that "religious freedom is central to all freedoms". In September 2020, Moore referred to Black Lives Matter as a "Marxist movement whose doctrines about white people are explicitly racist".

=== Criticism of the BBC ===
Moore is a critic of the BBC, which he believes has a left-wing bias. Moore was fined £262 for not possessing a TV licence in May 2010, eighteen months after announcing that he would donate the amount payable as a television licence to Help the Aged because the BBC had failed to sack Jonathan Ross for his "Sachsgate" prank with Russell Brand. He saw the episode as part of an ongoing "pathology" at the BBC, rather than being an isolated incident.

In December 2019, Moore was a guest editor on the BBC flagship news programme, Today, where he invited fellow Global Warming Policy Foundation affiliates Matt Ridley and Michael Kelly to be interviewed in back-to-back editions of the programme also featuring climate activist Greta Thunberg and climate scientist Kevin Anderson. Moore said the BBC was biased against climate change deniers. Today host, Nick Robinson, said that the corporation's coverage was governed by "Ofcom regulations and the law" and that it reported the "global consensus" on climate science, denying it preached a certain position.

Sir David Clementi, the outgoing chairman of the BBC, warned the government that lining up Moore as his successor would "put off" candidates. Moore was reported to have been the Prime Minister's preferred choice for chairman before the position had been advertised. However, since then, Moore has said he decided against applying for personal reasons, although Moore's demand for a pay rise over the current salary and discomfort over his previous comments were also reported.

=== Criticism of David Cameron ===
Moore was a critic of David Cameron's Conservative Party modernisation strategy, that he stated embraced "subjects which they had previously ceded to the Left, like health, welfare, the environment and schools", which he believed had supported the interests of government organisations rather than that of the consumer. In particular, Moore has been critical of the National Health Service, which he considers "a terrible organisation".

In December 2009, regarding the Beano character Lord Snooty, the nickname Private Eye uses for Moore, Moore wrote that "he is the ideal role model for David Cameron." In 2011, after the News International phone hacking scandal became public knowledge, he wondered if the Left had been right all along, not only in their objection to Rupert Murdoch's power, but also whether "'the free market' is actually a set-up."

=== On the English Defence League ===
In June 2013, Moore said that following the murder of Lee Rigby by Islamic terrorists, the BBC and organisations which monitor attacks against Muslims and anti-Muslim prejudice, such as Tell MAMA, had set a trap "inviting those of us who reject such statements" (i.e. that anti-Muslim prejudice had increased following the attacks) "to defend the [English Defence League]. I do not." He described the EDL as a "reactive organisation" which "does not – officially at least – support violence". Moore also said "If we attack the EDL for being racist, fascist and pro-violence, we can do so with impunity, although we are not being strictly accurate" and that "the only serious violence was against a British soldier". Sadiq Khan said in his response to Moore that "Al-Rahma Islamic Centre had been burnt to the ground, or to the 182 staff and pupils evacuated from the Darul Uloom School in Chiselhurst, traumatised by an arson attack in the middle of the night".

=== On gay rights ===
Moore has expressed his view that civil partnerships achieved a "balance" for heterosexual and homosexual couples. In July 2013, Moore wrote that he opposed changing the definition of marriage, writing in The Spectator: "I wonder if the law will eventually be changed to allow one to marry one's dog." In 2015, Moore wrote that a "gay rights sharia" was dictating what the LGBT+ community should believe following Dolce & Gabbana's openly gay founders criticising gay adoptions. The BBC's Today programme had featured Patrick Strudwick, the LGBT editor of BuzzFeed, as a guest. According to Moore, "Strudwick was made furiously righteous by the fact that Dolce himself is gay." Moore wrote that "If you are gay, Mr Strudwick seemed to assert, there are certain things you must believe. Nothing else is permitted under the gay rights sharia."

In 2013, he wrote that "Respectable people are truly terrified of being thought anti-homosexual. In a way, they are right to be, because attacking people for their personal preferences can be a nasty thing." In 2017, Moore opposed banning the pseudoscientific practice of conversion therapy, asking: "Why should they not be entitled to seek escape [from homosexual feelings]?" A partial ban on conversion therapy for England and Wales was later announced in the 2021 Queen's Speech.

=== On Islam, terrorism and immigration ===
In the wake of the June 2015 Sousse attacks, in which 38 Westerners were murdered by an Islamist who had apparently been seduced by an associate of Abu Qatada, Moore wrote an essay the thesis of which was that ISIS and its fellow-travellers truly believe only it can defeat the conspiracy that runs the world and that there is no possible common ground. He concluded that "It is not paranoid to say that there is a deadly enemy within [the UK] and not intolerant to want to defeat it."

Moore wrote in September 2015 that Muslim immigration meant "more political disturbance, more communal tension, more intolerance of other faiths and more terrorism".

In January 2017 Moore defended Donald Trump after the President attempted to ban citizens of several Muslim nations entering the US. Moore described the criticisms of Trump as "foaming" and "ridiculous" in an editorial for The Daily Telegraph.

=== Alleged sexism ===
In August 2015, Moore received media attention and criticism after he wrote an article for The Spectator about the 2015 Labour Party leadership election, titled "Have Yvette Cooper and Liz Kendall got the looks for a leadership contest?", in which he wrote "there is an understanding that no leader—especially, despite the age of equality, a woman—can look grotesque on television and win a general election" and discussed the looks of the two female candidates in detail. The article was condemned by Kendall, First Minister of Scotland Nicola Sturgeon and Tessa Jowell, candidate for the Labour nomination for Mayor of London and former Minister and MP, along with several journalists and MPs from various parties.

In August 2019 he was criticised for suggesting that Olivia Colman had a "distinctly leftwing face" which cast a doubt in his mind on her ability to play the role of the Queen in the then-upcoming season of The Crown.

=== Climate change ===
In 2015, Moore was made a trustee of the Global Warming Policy Foundation, sanctioned by the Charity Commission, described by The Independent as the UK's most prominent climate science denial campaign group. Bob Ward the ESRC Centre for Climate Change Economics and Policy at the London School of Economics and Political Science has said that the Global Warming Policy Foundation does not disclose its funding and that Moore or his allies at the Foundation do "not declare their affiliation to the Foundation when promoting climate change denial" and that "Moore's many articles for 'The Daily Telegraph' about climate change do not mention his connection".

In April 2017, he authored an article for The Daily Telegraph which advocated "a bonfire of green regulations" and a return to fossil fuels to improve the British economy after Brexit.

According to Bob Ward, director at the Grantham Research Institute on Climate Change, Moore incorrectly claimed in 2018 that the United States had successfully reduced its CO2 emissions globally and their emissions had hit a 25-year low last year. Ward also claimed that Moore incorrectly claimed that Germany and Japan are increasing their carbon footprint because they have "run away from nuclear".

Media offices
Preceded by Alexander Chancellor	Editor of The Spectator; 1984–1990	Succeeded by Dominic Lawson
Preceded by Gordon Brook-Shepherd	Deputy Editor of The Daily Telegraph; 1990–1992	Succeeded by Trevor Grove and Veronica Wadley
Preceded by Trevor Grove	Editor of The Sunday Telegraph; 1992–1995	Succeeded by Dominic Lawson
Preceded by Sir Max Hastings	Editor of The Daily Telegraph; 1995–2003	Succeeded by Martin Newland
Orders of precedence in the United Kingdom
Preceded by The Lord Mendoza	Gentlemen; Baron Moore of Etchingham	Followed by The Lord Spencer of Alresford
