= The Age of Decadence: Britain 1880 to 1914 =

2017 book by Simon Heffer

- Author: Simon Heffer
- Language: English
- Publisher: Random House
- Publication date: 2017
- Publication place: United Kingdom
- Pages: 912
- ISBN: 978-1-84794-742-0

The Age of Decadence: Britain 1880 to 1914 is a 2017 book by the English historian Simon Heffer. It has been published in the United States as The Age of Decadence: A History of Britain 1880–1914.

== Summary ==
Simon Heffer chronicles the late Victorian era of British history. He portrays it as a decadent period, where an increasingly incompetent establishment wasted the prosperity and disintegrated the social structures that previous generations had struggled to build up.
