= Martin Newland =

British journalist

- Born: 26 October 1961 (age 64); Port Harcourt, Nigeria
- Education: Downside School; Royal Military Academy Sandhurst; Goldsmiths, University of London; Heythrop College, University of London
- Occupation: Journalist
- Employer(s): Catholic Herald; National Post; The Daily Telegraph; The National
- Spouse: Benedicte Smets
- Children: 4

Martin Newland (born 26 October 1961) is a British journalist, a former Editor of The Daily Telegraph who now consults on media and communications, most recently in the Middle East. He was an advisor to Abu Dhabi Media and before that was Executive Director Publishing, Abu Dhabi Media. Prior to that, he was launch Editor of The National, a national newspaper in Abu Dhabi. Before that, he was editor of The Daily Telegraph, a British broadsheet newspaper, from 2003 to 2005, replacing Charles Moore. Newland was appointed Editor upon his return from Canada where he was a launch editor and Deputy Editor of Conrad Black's new national newspaper The National Post. The launch of the Post started one of the most costly and intense newspaper wars in North America.

== Education ==
Newland was educated at Downside School, the Royal Military Academy Sandhurst, Goldsmiths College at the University of London, where he took a BA in History and Heythrop College (also at the University of London), where he took an MA in Theology.

== Life and career ==
Newland worked to preserve The Daily Telegraph when it was purchased in June 2004 from Hollinger International by the Barclay brothers, then owners of The Scotsman newspaper and The Business magazine.

After the takeover, it was confirmed that Newland would remain as editor under the new owners, despite some reports that he would be replaced by Dominic Lawson, editor of the Sunday Telegraph, and others such as Andrew Neil, publisher of The Scotsman and The Business.

Newland was opposed to introducing a compact (tabloid) version of The Daily Telegraph but was known to want to introduce some changes to the broadsheet.

Newland resigned as Daily Telegraph editor on 18 November 2005. His temporary replacement was confirmed as John Bryant, the Telegraph Group's newly appointed Editor-in-Chief. Bryant was never officially editor of the Daily Telegraph, a much-coveted office previously held by the likes of Lord Deedes and Max Hastings.

In August 2007, Press Gazette reported that Newland was due to launch a new newspaper in Abu Dhabi, in the United Arab Emirates.

The National, was launched on 17 April 2008. It is the UAE's sixth daily English-language newspaper but the only one printed in Abu Dhabi.

== Previous career ==
Newland was born in Port Harcourt, Nigeria. Prior to becoming editor of The Daily Telegraph, he worked at the Catholic Herald from 1986 to 1989; then became a reporter and home editor on The Daily Telegraph (1989–98). He was deputy editor on the National Post, a conservative Canadian daily founded in 1998 by Lord Black of Crossharbour. Under Newland's news direction, the upstart daily found a distinctive voice and quickly came to within striking distance of the venerable, but colourless The Globe and Mail, before mounting losses forced major cutbacks in editorial staffing levels. Before that Newland was home editor, news editor and a reporter for The Daily Telegraph.

A devout Catholic, he is married to Benedicte, née Smets, the sister of Pascale Smets, who is married to The Telegraph's pocket cartoonist Matt. The couple have four children.

== Notes ==
Media offices
Preceded by Charles Moore	Editor of The Daily Telegraph; 2003 - 2005	Succeeded by John Bryant
